= Coronation of Nicholas II and Alexandra Feodorovna =

1896 coronation in Russia

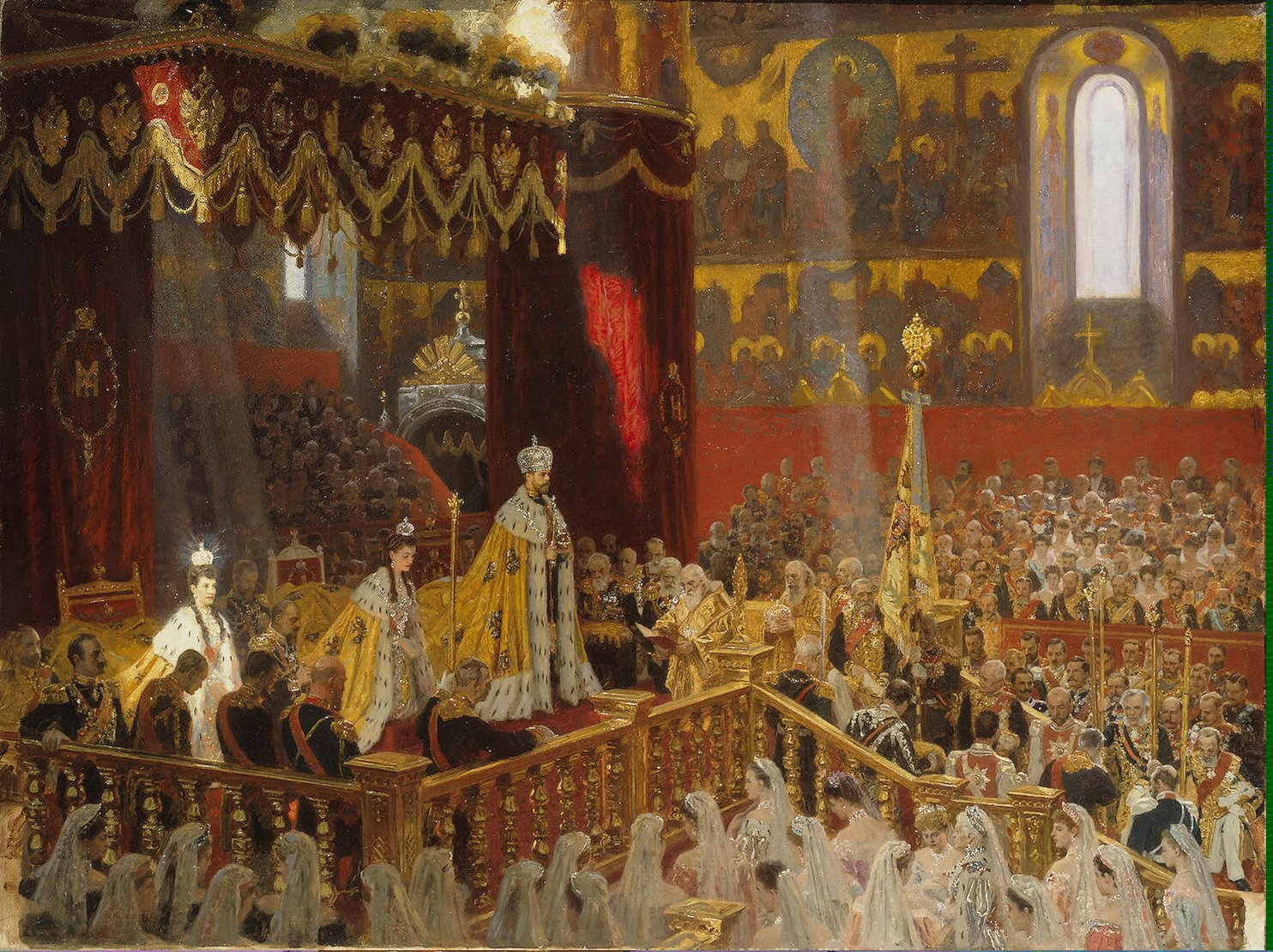
L. Tuxen. "The coronation of Nicholas II in the Assumption Cathedral of the Moscow Kremlin on May 14, 1896". 1898. The State of the Hermitage Museum, St. Petersburg

The coronation of Emperor Nicholas II and his wife, Empress Alexandra Feodorovna was the last coronation during the Russian Empire. It took place on Tuesday, 14 May (O.S., 26 May N.S.) 1896, in Dormition Cathedral in the Moscow Kremlin. Nicholas II, known in Russian as Nikolai II Aleksandrovich, was the last emperor of Russia.

== Preparations ==
On 1 January (O.S., 13 January N.S.) 1896, the manifesto "On the upcoming Holy Coronation of Their Imperial Majesties" was published, according to which the coronation ceremony was to be held in May, and inviting the Government Senate in Moscow, and other representatives of the Russian Empire, to attend. Responsibility for organizing the ceremony was assigned to the Ministry of the Imperial Court, on the basis of which the Coronation Commission and the Coronation Office were organized.

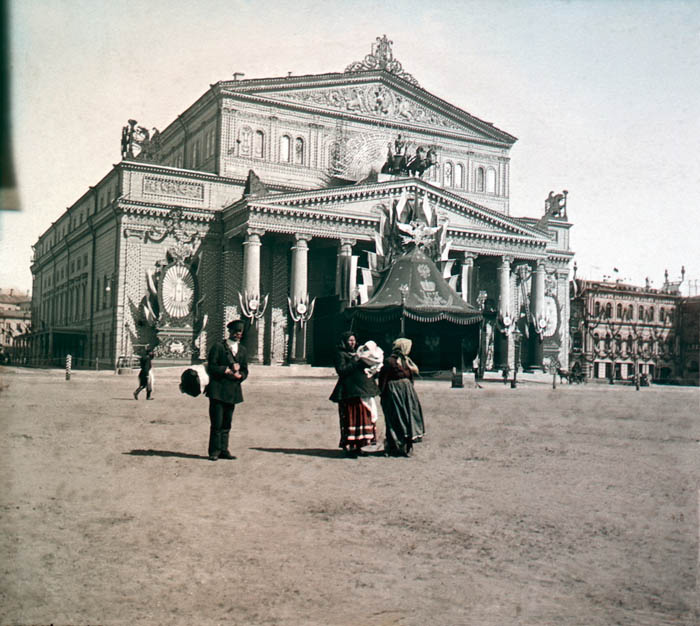
Bolshoi Theater in festive attire

The official coronation period was from 6 May to 26 May 1896, with 25 May being the birthday of Empress Alexandra Feodorovna. On 26 May, a manifesto was published that expressed the gratitude of the monarch to the inhabitants of Moscow.

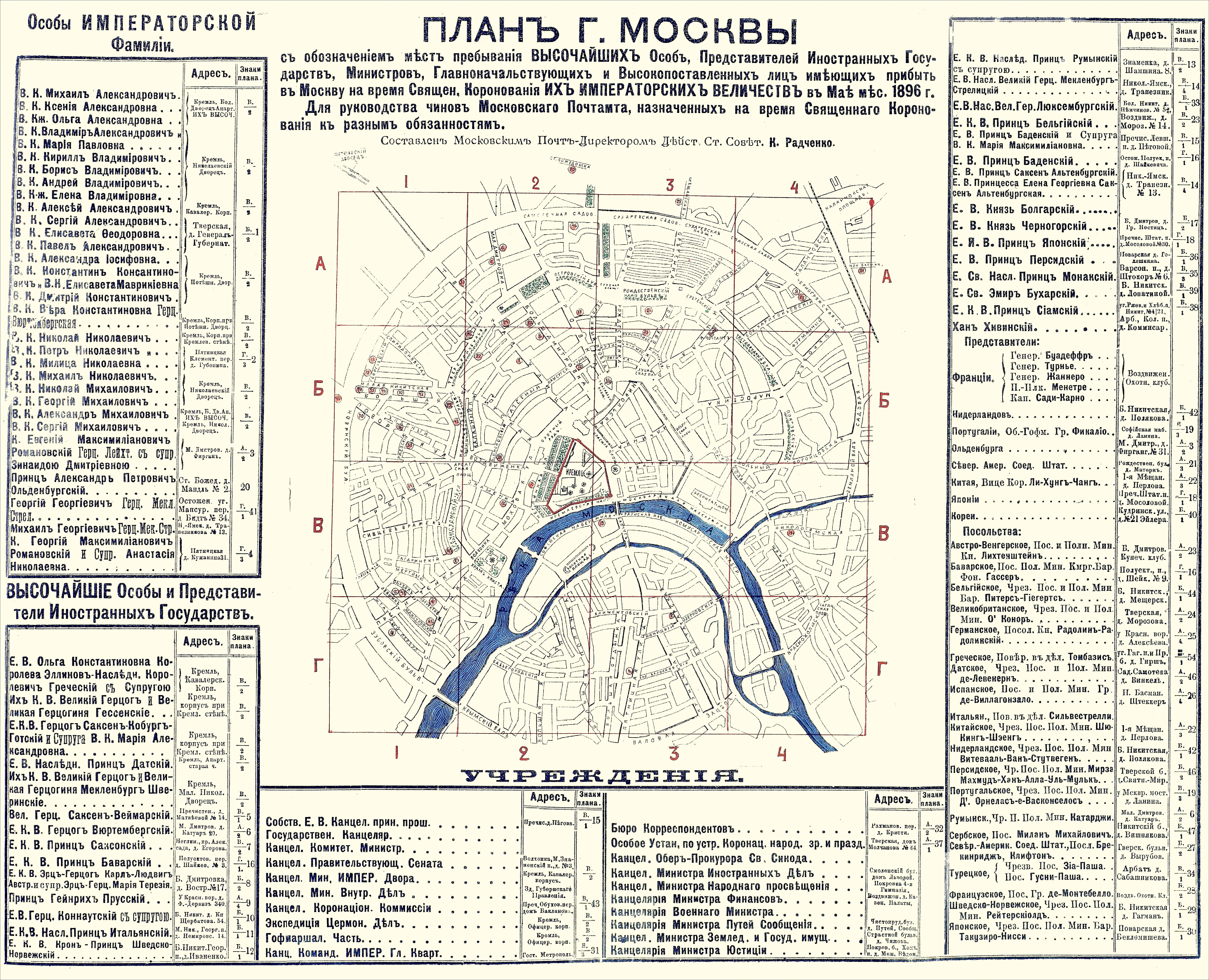
"The plan of the city of Moscow with the designation of the places of residence of the HIGHEST Special Representatives, Representatives of Foreign States, Commanders and Senior Officials who have arrived in Moscow during the Holy Day. Coronations of Their Imperial Majesties in May 1896. For the leadership of the Moscow Post Office officials assigned to different duties during the Holy Coronation, compiled by the Moscow Post-Director Art. Council K. Radchenko

It was proposed that all persons participating in the 9 May ceremonial entrance of the imperial couple to Moscow arrive in Moscow no later than 5 May. The ceremonial entry was to be from the Petrovsky Palace on Petersburg Highway and further along Tverskaya-Yamskaya and Tverskaya streets.

Preparations for the celebrations were the responsibility of the Minister of the Imperial Court Count I. I. Vorontsov-Dashkov. The High Marshal was Count K. I. Palen; the supreme master of ceremonies was Prince A. S. Dolgorukov. The duties of the herald were performed by E. K. Pribylsky, an official of the Senate. A coronation unit was formed from 82 battalions, 36 squadrons, 9 companies, and 28 batteries, under the command of the Grand Duke Vladimir Alexandrovich, under whom was a special headquarters with the rights of the General Staff led by Lieutenant General N.I. Bobrikov. Vladimir Alexandrovich arrived in Moscow and took command on 3 May 1896.

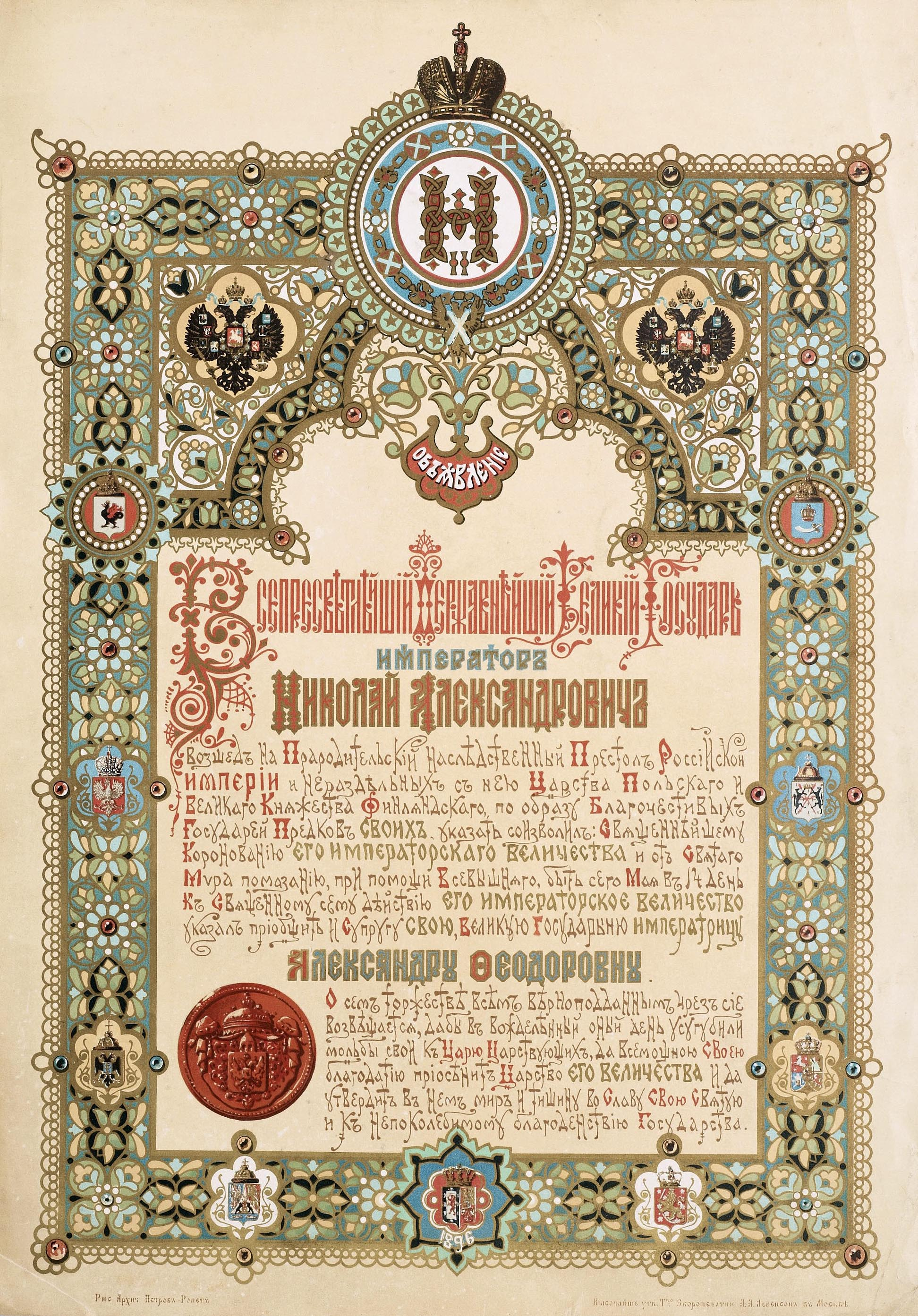
Announcement of the Holy Coronation of Emperor Nikolai Alexandrovich (Nicholas II) and Empress Alexandra Feodorovna (Alexandra Fedorovna (wife of Nicholas II))

In April 1896, more than 8,000 pounds of table settings were brought from St. Petersburg to Moscow, with gold and silver sets alone weighing up to 1,500 pounds. The Kremlin arranged 150 special telegraph wires to connect all the embassies.

== Pre-coronation festivities ==
On Sparrow Hills—where the Vorobyov Palace used to be, and where, starting in 1817, the Cathedral of Christ the Saviour designed by Aleksandr Vitberg was constructed—a special "royal pavilion" was erected for the newly crowned couple.

On 6 May, the birthday of Nicholas II, the emperor and empress arrived at the Smolensky railway station in Moscow, where they were met by members of the imperial family, dignitaries, imperial officials, and crowds of people. The Governor-General of Moscow—uncle to the emperor and husband of the empress's sister Elizabeth Feodorovna—Grand Duke Sergei Alexandrovich arrived with the couple, having met the emperor and empress at Wedge station. From the station the imperial couple proceeded in a closed carriage to Petrovsky Palace.

The scale and pomp of the preparations significantly exceeded previous coronations.

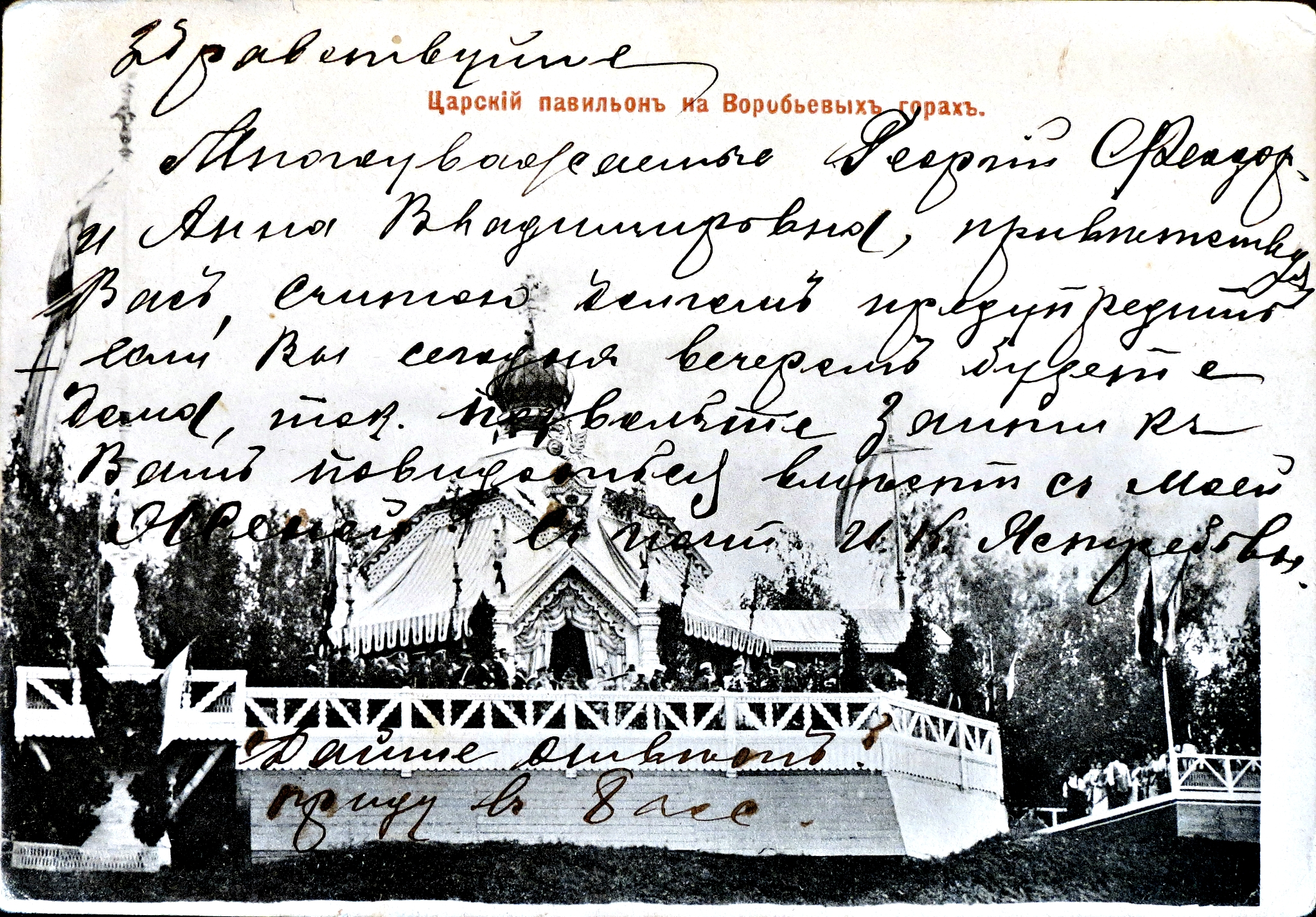
"Royal Pavilion" on Sparrow Hills. Postcard of the late 19th century.

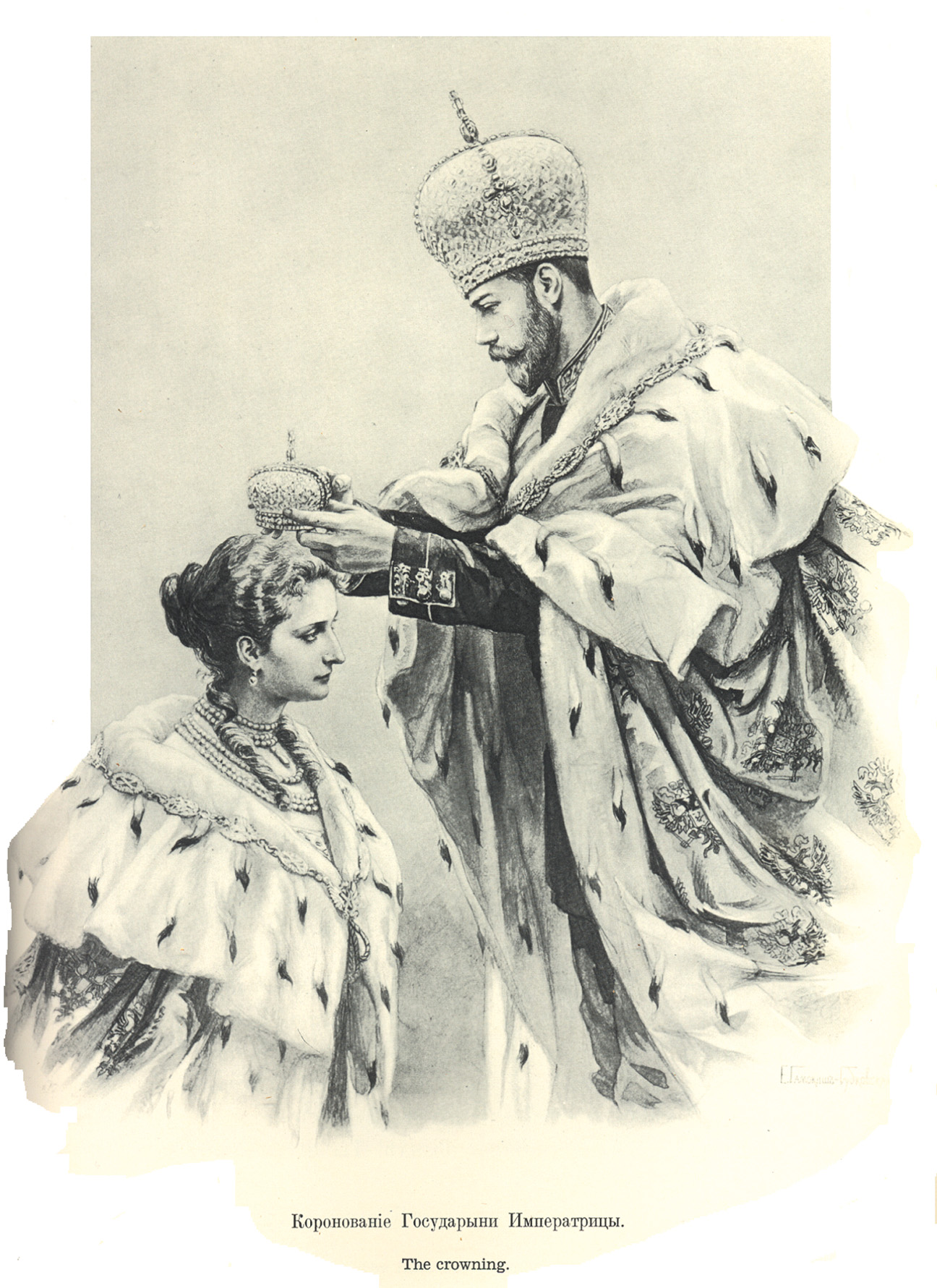
Coronation of Alexandra Feodorovna.

On 7 May, the imperial couple held an audience for the Emir of Bukhara Mohammed Alim Khan and his heir, as well as the Khan of Khiva Muhammad Rahim Khan II, in the Petrovsky Palace.

On 8 May, Maria Feodorovna, the Empress Dowager, arrived at Smolensky Railway Station, and was met by a large crowd of people.

That same evening, outside Petrovsky Palace, the imperial couple were serenaded by 1,200 people, which included the choir of the Imperial Russian Opera, conservatory students, members of the Russian Choral Society.

On 9 May, the solemn entry into the city took place. A police escort came first, with a platoon of gendarmes, next came the imperial convoy, a string of carriages with dignitaries, followed by the horse guards, imperial personal convoy, one hundred of the Life-Cossacks, His Majesty's regiment, six in a row, and so on.

== Coronation ceremony ==
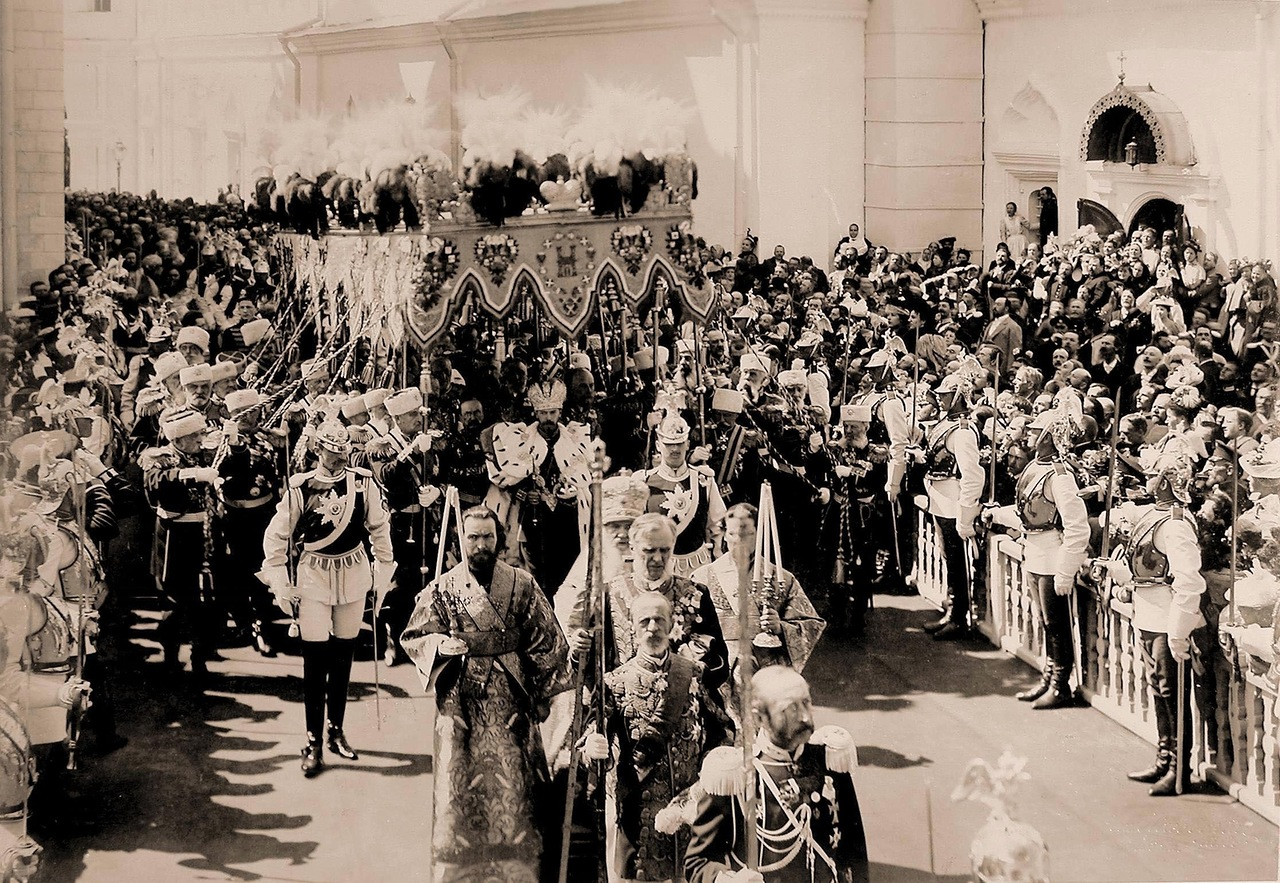
The solemn procession in the Kremlin. On the left, in the honor guard of the Life Guards Cavalry Regiment – Gustaf Mannerheim

On 14 May, the day of the Coronation, in all the churches in St. Petersburg, the liturgy was read and prayers of thanksgiving recited. The metropolitan cathedrals could not accommodate all the worshippers, in view of which prayers were also recited in the squares near a number of cathedrals and some churches, as well as in the Horse Guards.

The coronation ceremony began at 10 am, with the emperor, his mother, and his wife seated on thrones on a special raised platform installed in the middle of the cathedral. The emperor sat on the throne of Tsar Mikhail Feodorovich, Empress Maria Feodorovna on the throne of Tsar Alexy Mikhailovich Tishayshy, and Empress Alexandra Feodorovna on the throne of Grand Prince Ivan III of Russia.

The ceremony was presided over by Metropolitan Palladius, of St. Petersburg, the preeminent member of the Most Holy Synod (the Synod at the time of the coronation having been transferred to Moscow). During the liturgy, the metropolitan con-celebrated with the metropolitans of Kiev, Ioanikiy (Rudnev), and of Moscow, Sergius (Lyapidevsky). At the end of the liturgy the emperor and empress were anointed and then took communion of the Holy Mysteries at the altar. In the ministry of the liturgy, among others, John of Kronstadt also took part.

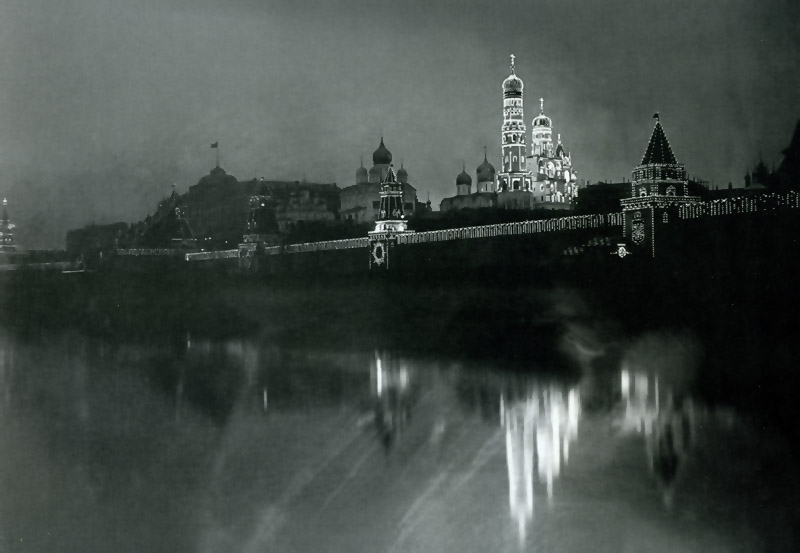
Illuminations in the Kremlin on the occasion of the coronation celebrations

=== Documentary film footage ===
Coronation of Nicholas II. Chronicle K. Serfa

The Belgian journalist Camille Cerf shot the only documentary movie footage of the coronation.

== Royal and foreign guests ==
- (Russian Empire) The Empress Dowager of Russia, the Emperor's mother
  - (Russian Empire) Grand Duchess Xenia Alexandrovna and Grand Duke Alexander Mikhailovich of Russia, the Emperor's sister and brother-in-law (also paternal first cousin once removed)
  - (Russian Empire) Grand Duchess Olga Alexandrovna of Russia, the Emperor's sister
- (Russian Empire) Grand Duke Vladimir Alexandrovich and Grand Duchess Marie Pavlovna of Russia, the Emperor's paternal uncle and aunt
  - (Russian Empire) Grand Duke Cyril Vladimirovich of Russia, the Emperor's paternal first cousin
  - (Russian Empire) Grand Duke Boris Vladimirovich of Russia, the Emperor's paternal first cousin
  - (Russian Empire) Grand Duke Andrei Vladimirovich of Russia, the Emperor's paternal first cousin
  - (Russian Empire) Grand Duchess Elena Vladimirovna of Russia, the Emperor's paternal first cousin
- (Russian Empire) Grand Duke Alexei Alexandrovich of Russia, the Emperor's paternal uncle
- (Russian Empire) Grand Duke Sergei Alexandrovich and Grand Duchess Elizabeth Fyodorovna of Russia, the Emperor's paternal uncle and aunt (also the Empress' brother-in-law and sister)
- (Russian Empire) Grand Duke Paul Alexandrovich of Russia, the Emperor's paternal uncle
- (Russian Empire) Grand Duchess Alexandra Iosifovna of Russia, the Emperor's paternal grandaunt by marriage
  - (Russian Empire) Grand Duke Konstantin Konstantinovich and Grand Duchess Elizabeth Mavrikievna of Russia, the groom's paternal first cousin once removed and his wife
  - (Russian Empire) Grand Duke Dmitry Konstantinovich of Russia, the Emperor's paternal first cousin once removed
  - (Kingdom of Württemberg) Duchess Vera of Württemberg, the Emperor's paternal first cousin once removed
    - (Kingdom of Württemberg) Duchess Elsa of Württemberg, the Emperor's paternal second cousin
    - (Kingdom of Württemberg) Duchess Olga of Württemberg, the Emperor's paternal second cousin
- (Russian Empire) Grand Duke Nicholas Nikolaevich of Russia, the Emperor's paternal first cousin once removed
- (Russian Empire) Grand Duke Peter Nikolaevich and Grand Duchess Militza Nikolaevna of Russia, the Emperor's paternal first cousin once removed and his wife
- (Russian Empire) Grand Duke George Mikhailovich of Russia, the Emperor's paternal first cousin once removed
- The Crown Prince of Denmark, the Emperor's maternal uncle (representing the King of Denmark)
- (Kingdom of Greece) The Queen of the Hellenes, the Emperor's maternal aunt by marriage and paternal first cousin once removed (representing the King of the Hellenes)
  - (Kingdom of Greece) The Duke of Sparta, the Emperor's maternal first cousin
  - (Kingdom of Greece) Prince George of Greece and Denmark, the Emperor's maternal first cousin
  - (Kingdom of Greece) Prince Nicholas of Greece and Denmark, the Emperor's maternal first cousin
- The Duke and Duchess of Saxe-Coburg and Gotha, the Emperor and Empress' mutual uncle and aunt
  - (Kingdom of Romania) The Crown Princess and Crown Prince of Romania, the Emperor and Empress' mutual first cousin and the Empress' maternal third cousin (representing the King of the Romanians)
  - The Grand Duchess and Grand Duke of Hesse, the Emperor and Empress' mutual first cousin and the Empress' brother
- Princess and Prince Louis of Battenberg, the Empress' sister and brother-in-law (also the Emperor and Empress' mutual first cousin once removed)
- The Duke and Duchess of Connaught and Strathearn, the Empress' maternal uncle and aunt (representing the Queen of the United Kingdom)
- (Kingdom of Prussia) Prince Henry of Prussia, the Empress' brother-in-law and maternal first cousin (representing the German Emperor)
- The Duke of Leuchtenberg, the Emperor's paternal first cousin once removed
- The Grand Duke of Saxe-Weimar-Eisenach, the Emperor's paternal first cousin twice removed
  - The Hereditary Grand Duke of Saxe-Weimar-Eisenach, the Emperor's paternal third cousin
- The Hereditary Grand Duke of Luxembourg, the Emperor's maternal second cousin (representing the Grand Duke of Luxembourg)
- (Grand Duchy of Oldenburg) Duke Alexander of Oldenburg, the Emperor's paternal second cousin once removed
  - (Grand Duchy of Oldenburg) Duke Peter Alexandrovich of Oldenburg, the Emperor's paternal second cousin
- (Grand Duchy of Oldenburg) Duke Constantine Petrovich of Oldenburg, the Emperor's paternal second cousin once removed
- (Grand Duchy of Mecklenburg-Schwerin) The Grand Duke and Grand Duchess of Mecklenburg-Schwerin, the Emperor's paternal second cousin once removed and paternal first cousin once removed
- (Grand Duchy of Mecklenburg-Schwerin) Duke Adolf Friedrich of Mecklenburg, the Emperor's paternal second cousin once removed
- (Principality of Bulgaria) The Prince of Bulgaria, the Empress' maternal second cousin once removed
- Prince Albert of Belgium, the Empress' maternal second cousin once removed (representing the King of the Belgians)
- (Grand Duchy of Mecklenburg-Strelitz) Duke Georg Alexander of Mecklenburg-Strelitz, the Emperor's paternal second cousin once removed
- (Grand Duchy of Mecklenburg-Strelitz) Duke Karl Michael of Mecklenburg-Strelitz, the Emperor's paternal second cousin once removed
- (Grand Duchy of Baden) The Hereditary Grand Duke of Baden, the Emperor's second cousin once removed (representing the Grand Duke of Baden)
- (Duchy of Saxe-Altenburg) Prince and Princess Albert of Saxe-Altenburg, the Emperor and Empress' mutual third cousin once removed and the Emperor's paternal second cousin once removed (representing the Duke of Saxe-Altenburg)
- The Hereditary Prince of Monaco, the Emperor and Empress' mutual third cousin (representing the Prince of Monaco)
- (Kingdom of Württemberg) Duke Albrecht of Württemberg, the Empress' maternal third cousin (representing the King of Württemberg)
- (Grand Duchy of Oldenburg) The Hereditary Grand Duke of Oldenburg, the Emperor's paternal third cousin once removed (representing the Grand Duke of Oldenburg)
- The Crown Prince of Sweden and Norway, the Emperor's fourth cousin (representing the King of Sweden and Norway)
- (Emirate of Bukhara) The Emir of Bukhara
  - (Emirate of Bukhara) The Crown Prince of Bukhara
- (Khanate of Khiva) The Khan of Khiva
  - (Khanate of Khiva) The Crown Prince of Khiva
- (Principality of Montenegro) The Prince of Montenegro
  - (Principality of Montenegro) The Crown Prince of Montenegro
  - (Principality of Montenegro) Prince Mirko of Montenegro
- (Kingdom of Saxony) Prince George of Saxony (representing the King of Saxony)
- (Kingdom of Italy) The Prince of Naples (representing the King of Italy)
- (Empire of Japan) Prince Fushimi Sadanaru (representing the Emperor of Japan)
- (Thailand) Prince Chirapravati Voradej (representing the King of Siam)
- (Kingdom of Bavaria) Prince Ludwig of Bavaria (representing the Prince Regent of Bavaria)
- Archduke Eugen of Austria (representing the Emperor of Austria-Hungary)
- Yusuf Ziya Pasha (representing the Sultan of the Ottoman Empire)
- (Kingdom of Serbia) Dragutin Franasović (representing the King of Serbia)
- (Qing dynasty) The Marquis Suy (representing the Emperor of China)
- (Joseon) Min Young-hwan (representing the King of Korea)
- (Qajar Iran) Prince Abbas Mirza Molk-Ara Qajar (representing the Shah of Persia)
- (Qajar Iran) Prince Haji Amanullah Mirza Qajar
- (Qajar Iran) Prince Mohammad Mirza Amir Touman
- Prince Franz of Liechtenstein (brother of the Prince of Liechtenstein)
- (Vatican City) Bishop Antonio Agliardi (representing the Pope)
- Raoul Le Mouton de Boisdeffre (representing the President of France)
- Don Manuel Iturbe (representing the President of Mexico)
- The Duke and Duchess of Najera (representing the Queen Regent of Spain)
- (Kingdom of Portugal) The Count of Ficalho (representing the King of Portugal)
- Ambassador Wittewaal-van-Stoetwegan (representing the Queen Regent of the Netherlands)
- (Grand Duchy of Mecklenburg-Strelitz) Friedrich von Maltzan (representing the Grand Duke of Mecklenburg-Strelitz)
- Clifton R. Breckinridge (representing the President of the United States)

== Post-coronation festivities ==
After the ceremony, on the same day, a royal meal was served in the Palace of Facets, in the Kremlin, which was attended by invited Russian subjects and by foreign representatives; and by tradition food was served in other parts of the palace. The following day, 15 May (O.S.), at 10.30 am, a reception for ambassadors took place. From 11:30 am to 3 pm, the emperor and empress accepted greetings from deputations, from all over Russia, in the Andreevsky throne room.

On the morning of 16 May, the kurtag (masked ball) in the Kremlin Palace was the first ball held, and was the first of a number of celebrations and balls.

In his diary, Nicholas II described what happened during those days:

May 13th. Monday.

We woke up with wonderful weather. Unfortunately I did not have time to take a walk because of the reports of Lobanov and Goremykin. Went to dinner at 11 o'clock. Breakfast with Mom and D. Fredy. We walked with them. We are very sorry to leave Alexandria; exactly that minute when the weather became summer and the green began to grow rapidly. At 3 1/2 we left for Moscow and settled in the Kremlin in our former rooms. I had to take the whole army of retinues of the princes who had come. At 7 o'clock we went with the whole family to the all-night vigil to "I will save for the golden lattice". Dined at 8 1/2 Mom and left early to her. Confessed in the bedroom. May the merciful Lord God help us, may he support us tomorrow and bless on peace-working life !!! ✙

14 May. Tuesday.

Great, solemn, but heavy in a moral sense, for Alix, mom and me, day. From 8 am they were on their feet; and our procession began only in 1/2 10. The weather was fortunately wondrous; the Red Porch represented a radiant look. All this happened in the Assumption Cathedral, although it seems like a real dream, but do not forget all my life !!! Returned to his half past one. At 3 o'clock the same procession went again in the Faceted Chamber to the meal. At 4 o'clock everything ended quite well; a soul full of gratitude to God, I completely rested afterwards. Dined with Mom, which fortunately stood the whole test. At 9 o'clock went to the upper balcony, where did Alix ignite the electric illumination on Ivan the Great and then the towers and walls of the Kremlin were lit up consistently, as well as the opposite embankment and Zamoskvorechye.

We went to bed early.

On 26 May, a commemorative silver medal was struck "In memory of the coronation of Emperor Nicholas II".

=== The Khodynka tragedy ===
Early in the morning of 18 May 1896, the day of the "national holiday" public feast on the Khodynka Field in honor of the coronation, a stampede led to 1,389 people being killed and 1,300 left with severe injuries, according to official figures—4,000 according to unofficial figures. On 19 May, an official government agency issued a telegram from Moscow that read: "Moscow, May 18th. The brilliant course of coronation celebrations was darkened by a regrettable event. Today, 18 May, long before the start of the national holiday, a crowd of a few hundred thousand moved so swiftly to the place of distribution of treats on the Khodynka field, that the elemental force crushed a multitude of people ...". Coronation events continued according to schedule: in particular, on the evening of the same day a ball was held at the French embassy. The sovereign was present at all the planned events, including the ball, and that presence was perceived ambivalently in the wake of the tragedy.

The Khodynka tragedy was considered a grim omen for the reign of Nicholas II, and at the end of the twentieth century it was cited by some as one of the arguments against his canonization (2000).

== Gallery ==
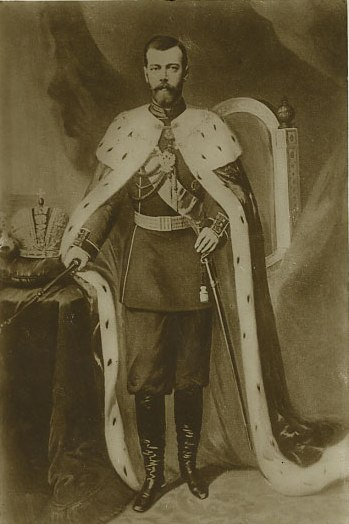
Nicholas II in the coronation mantle

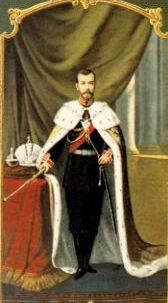
Portrait of Nicholas II

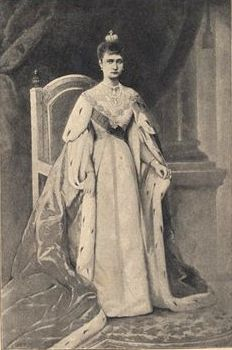
Alexandra Feodorovna in the coronation mantle

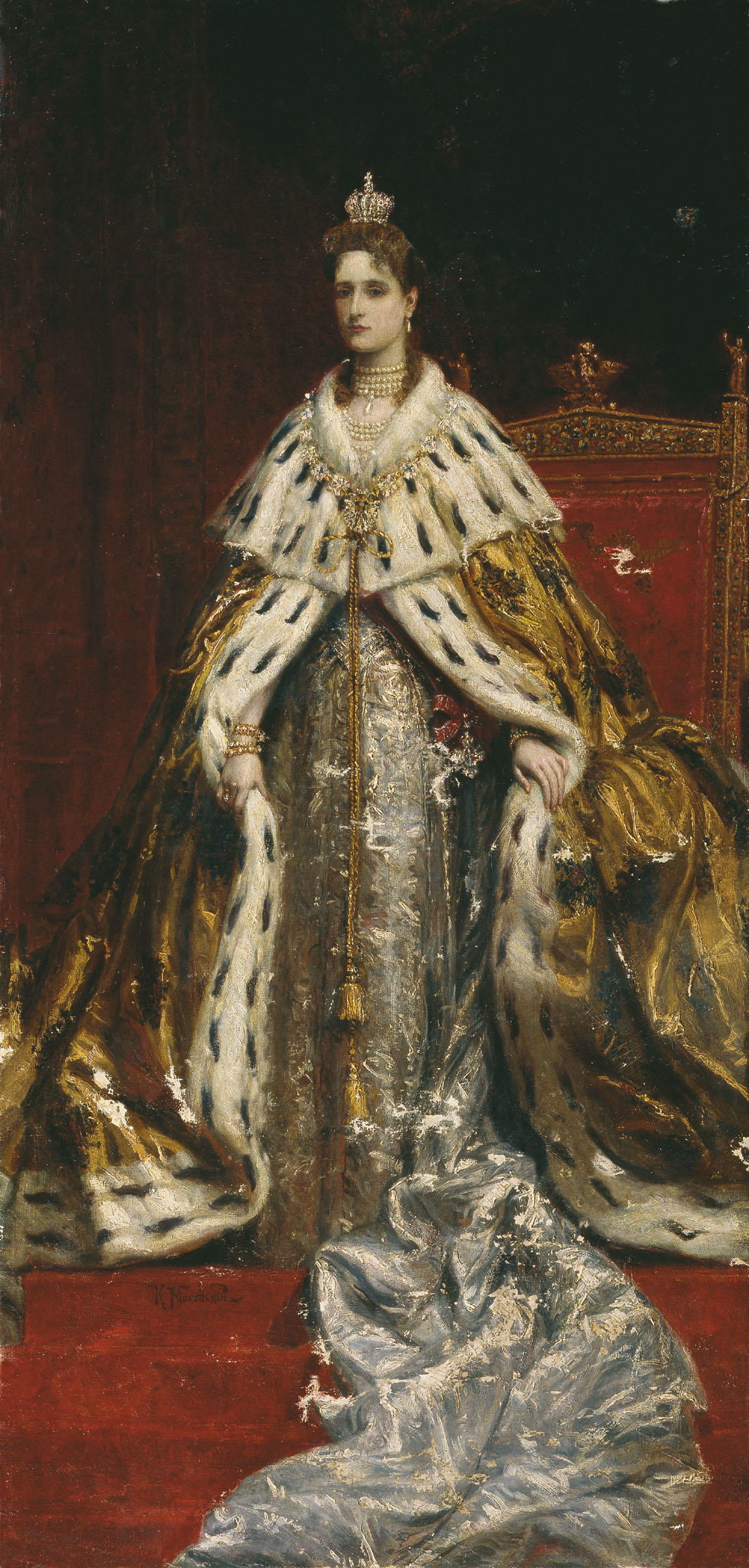
Alexandra Feodorovna

=== Guests ===
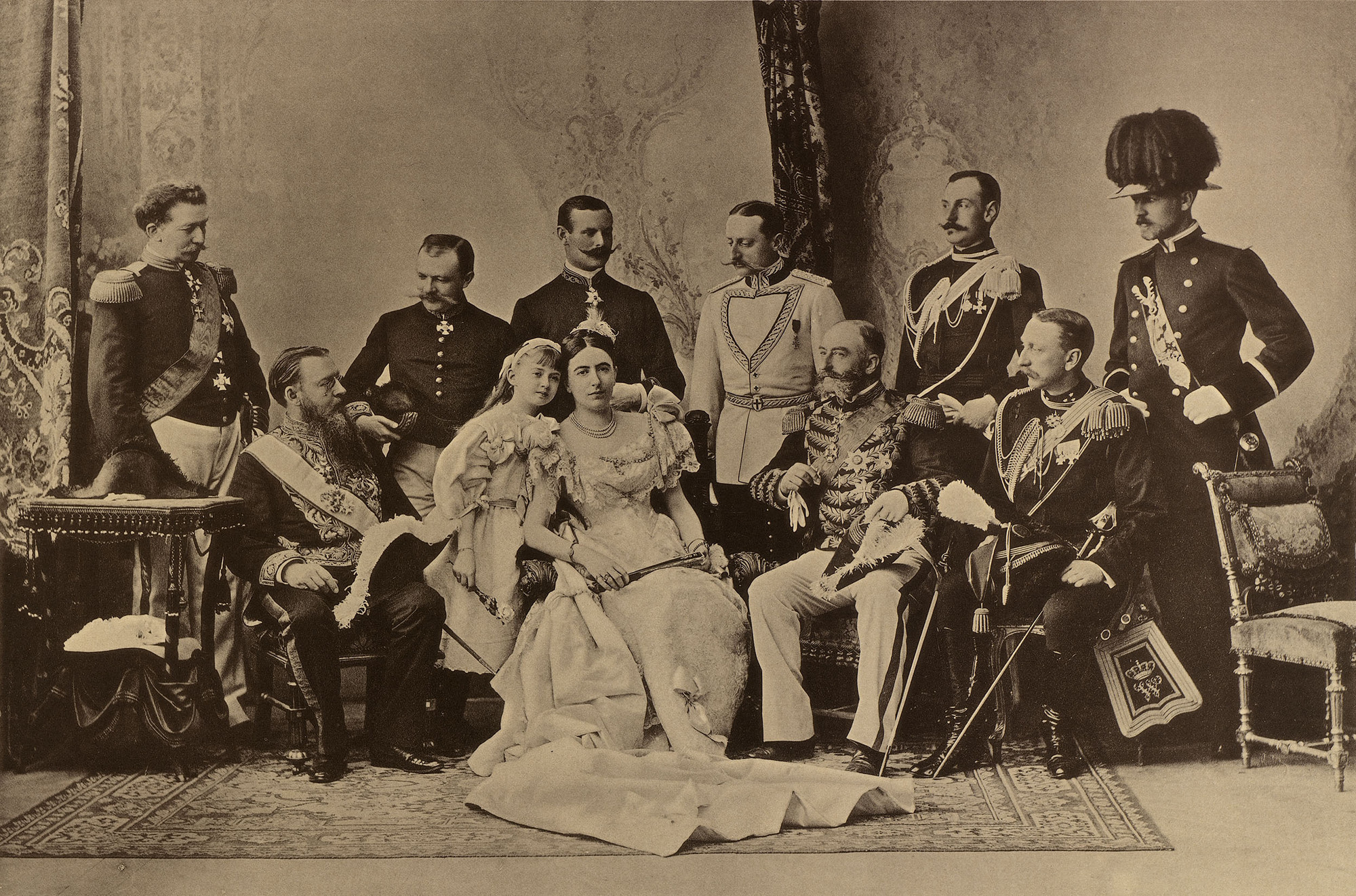
the Netherlands

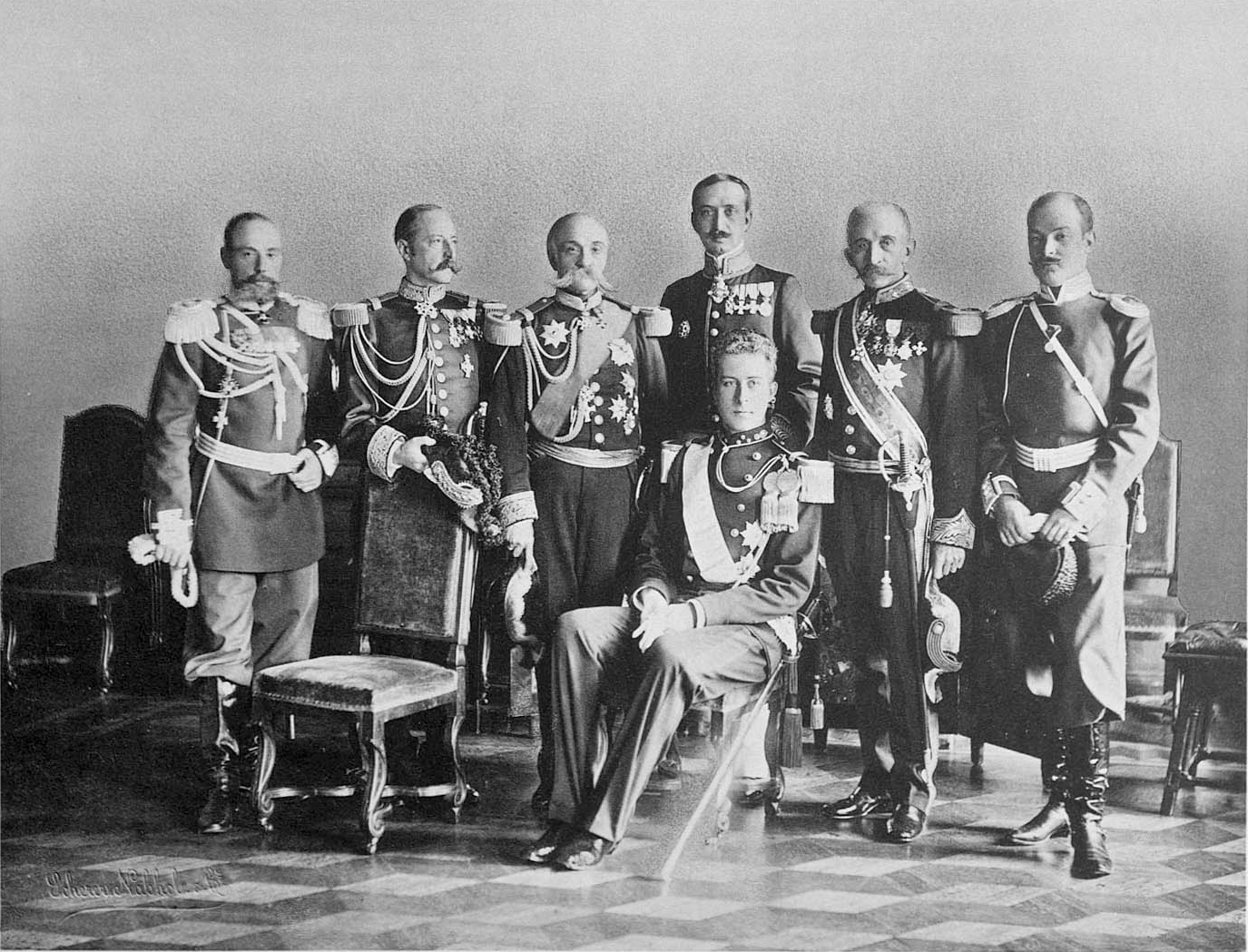
Belgium

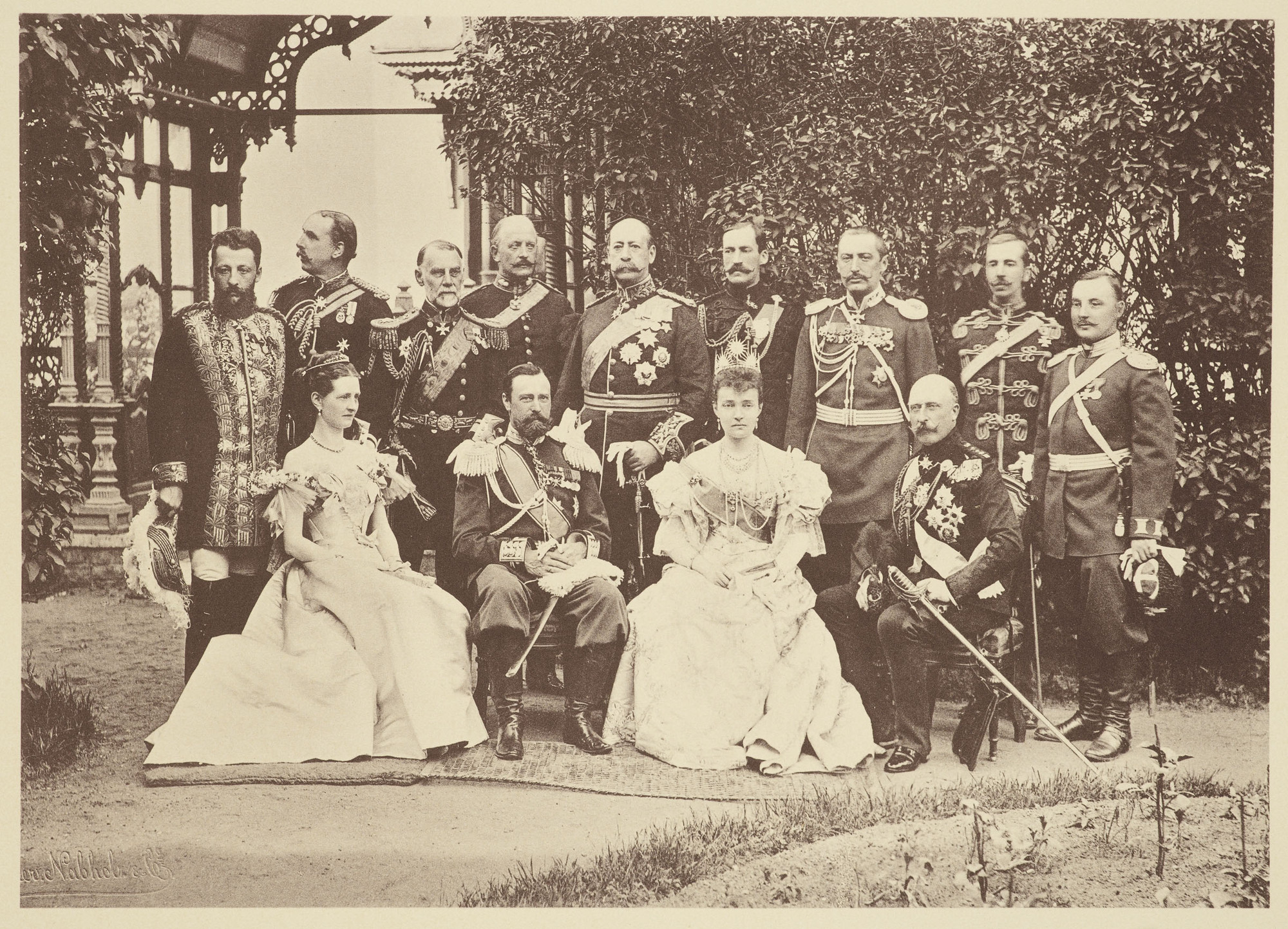
Britain

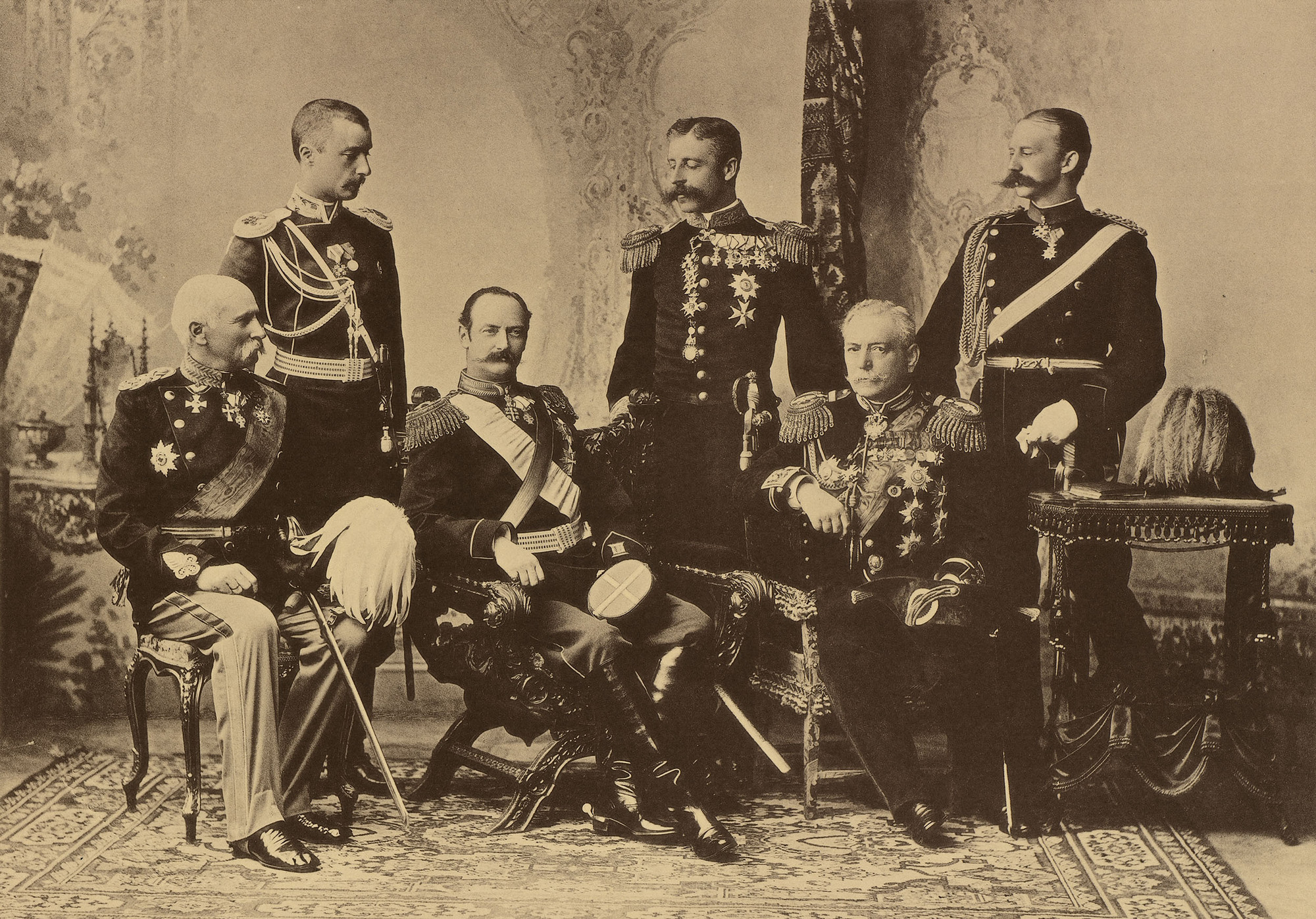
Denmark

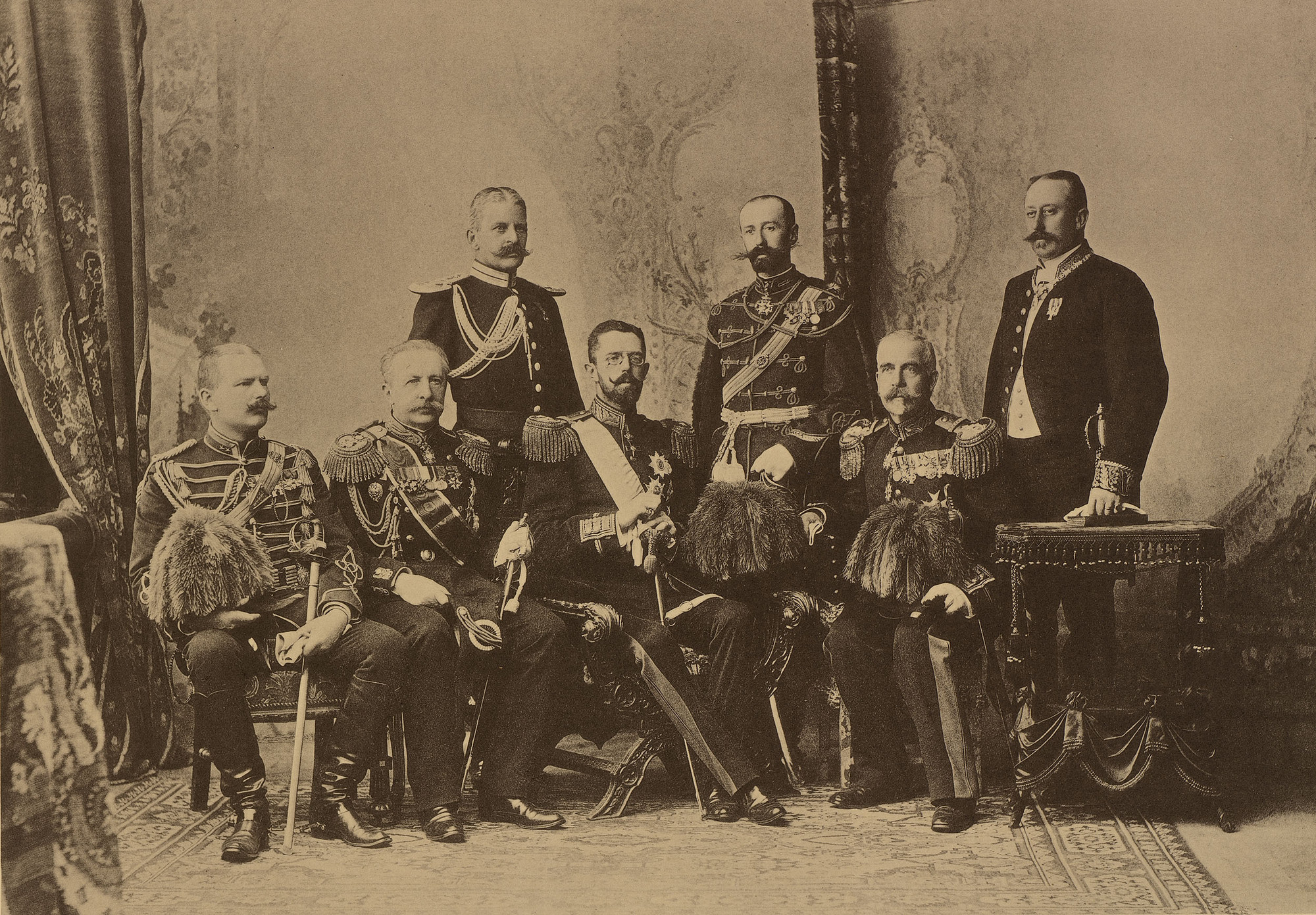
Union Sweden and Norway

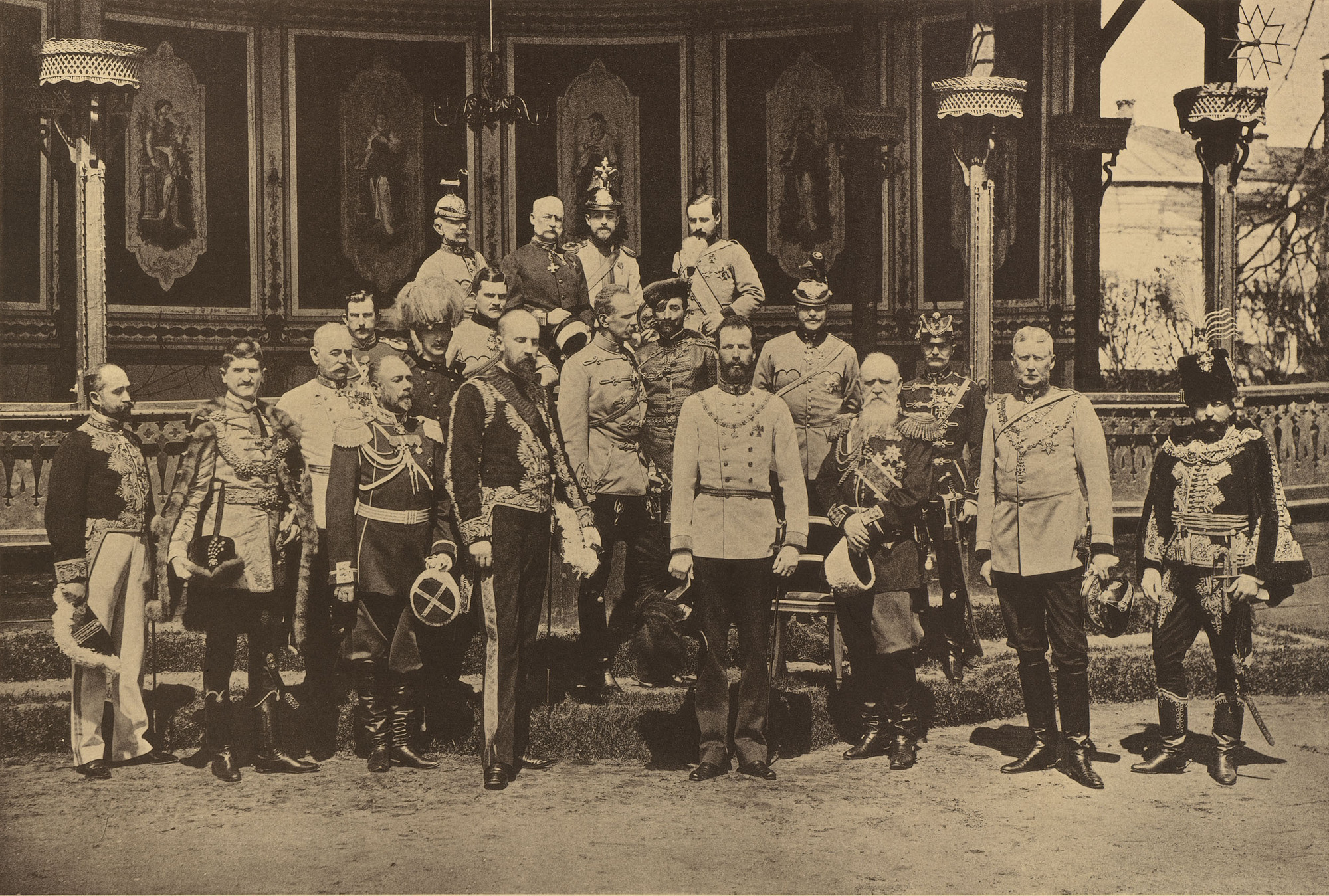
Austria-Hungary

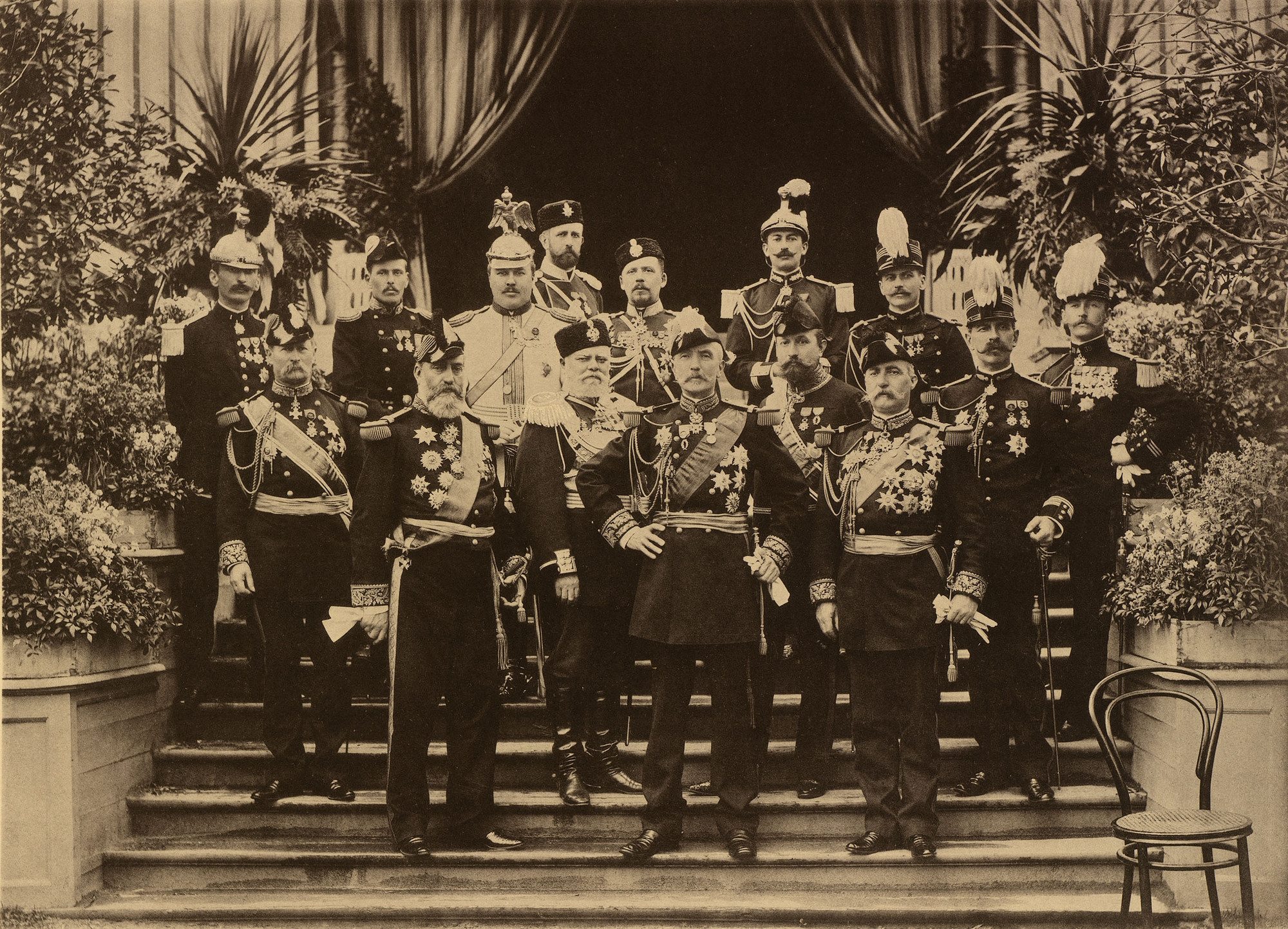
France

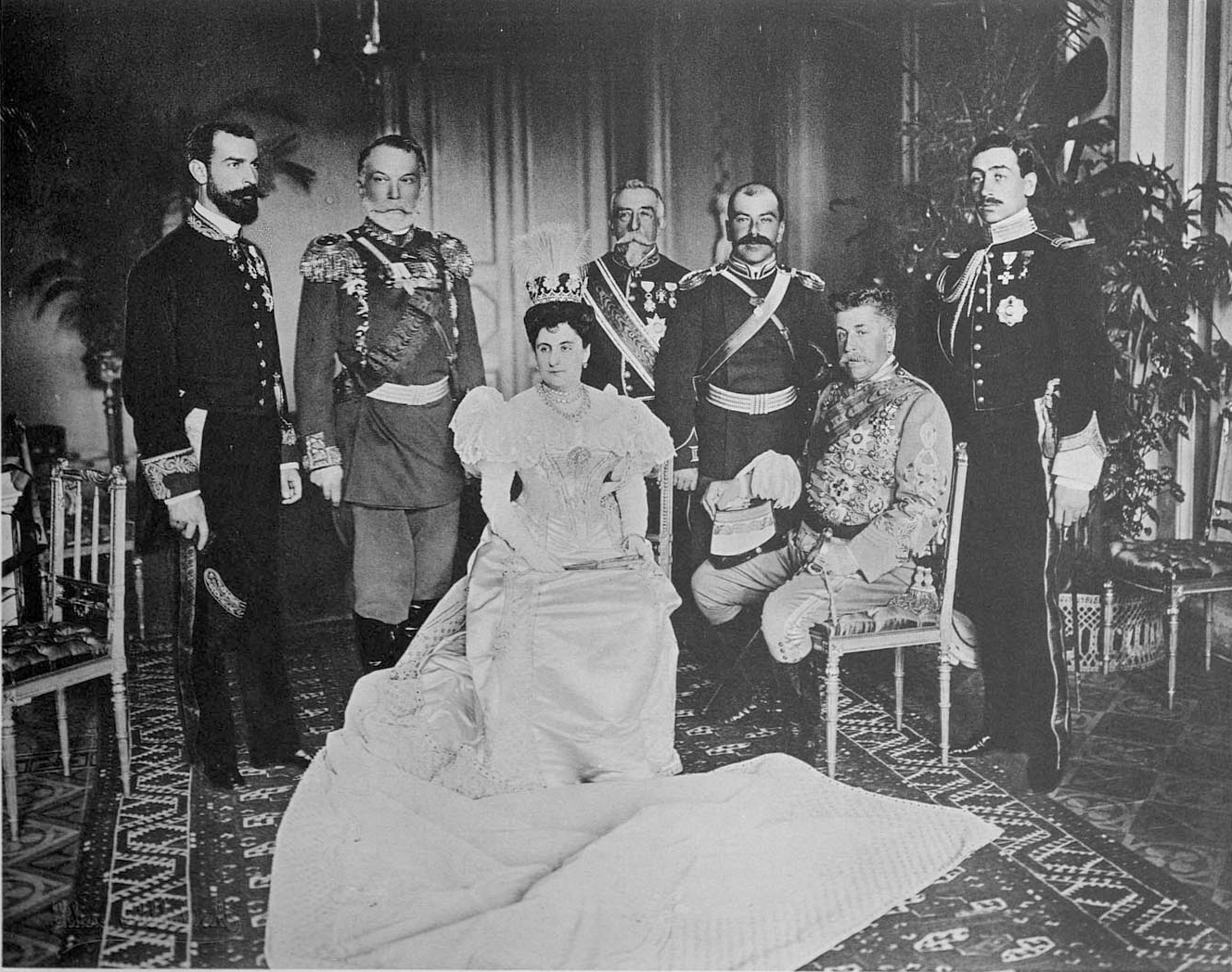
Spain

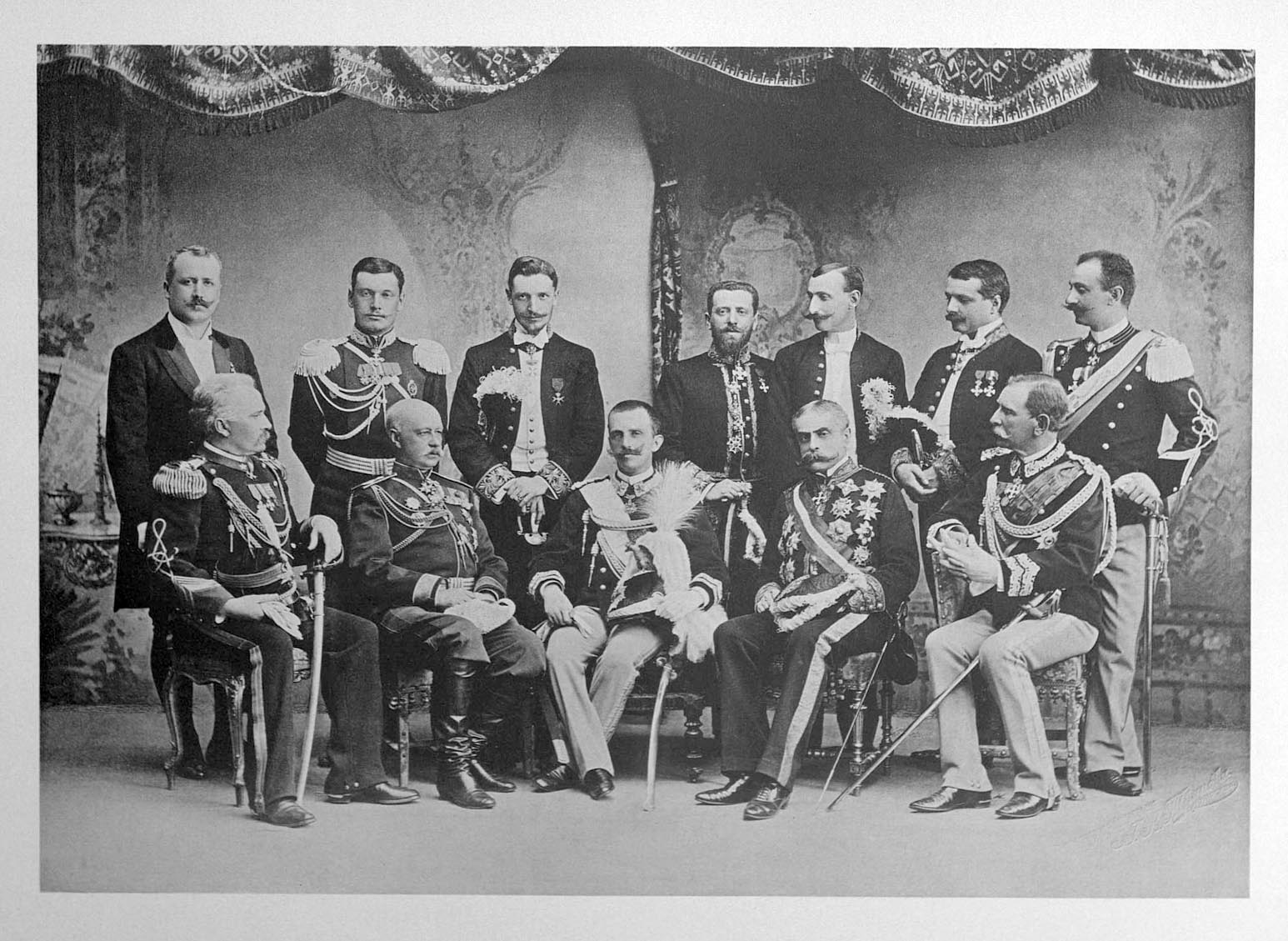
Italy

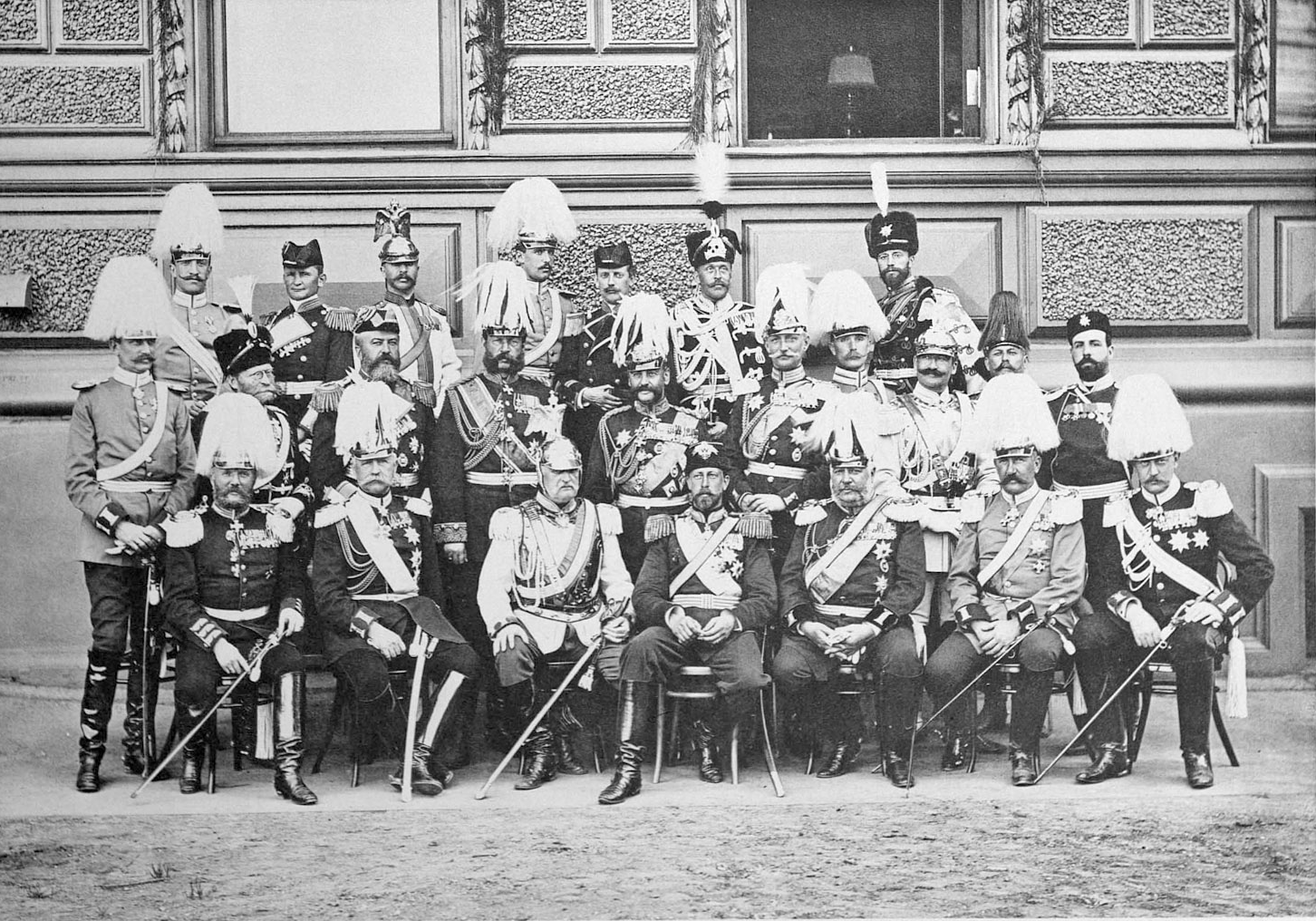
Prussia

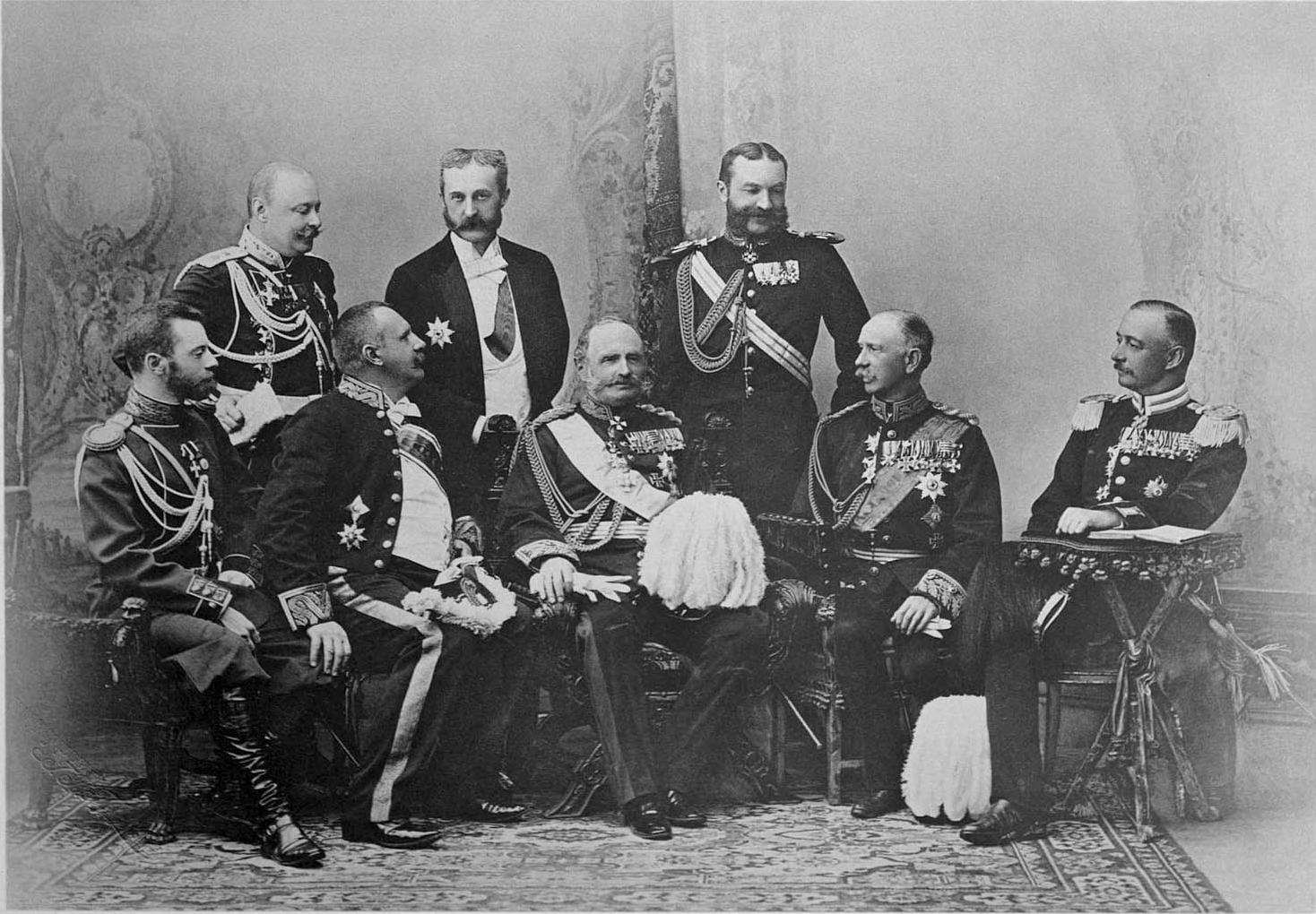
Saxony

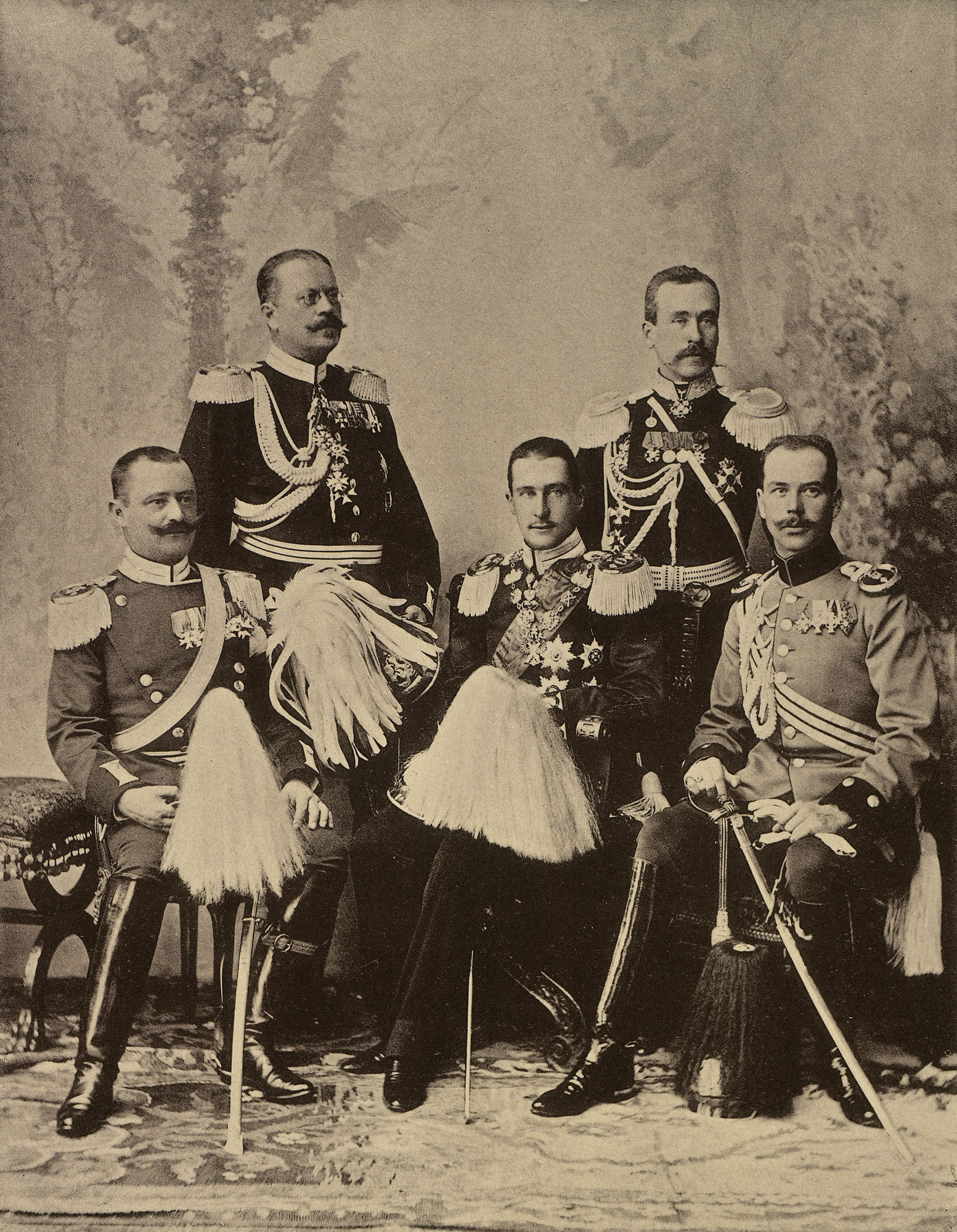
Württemberg

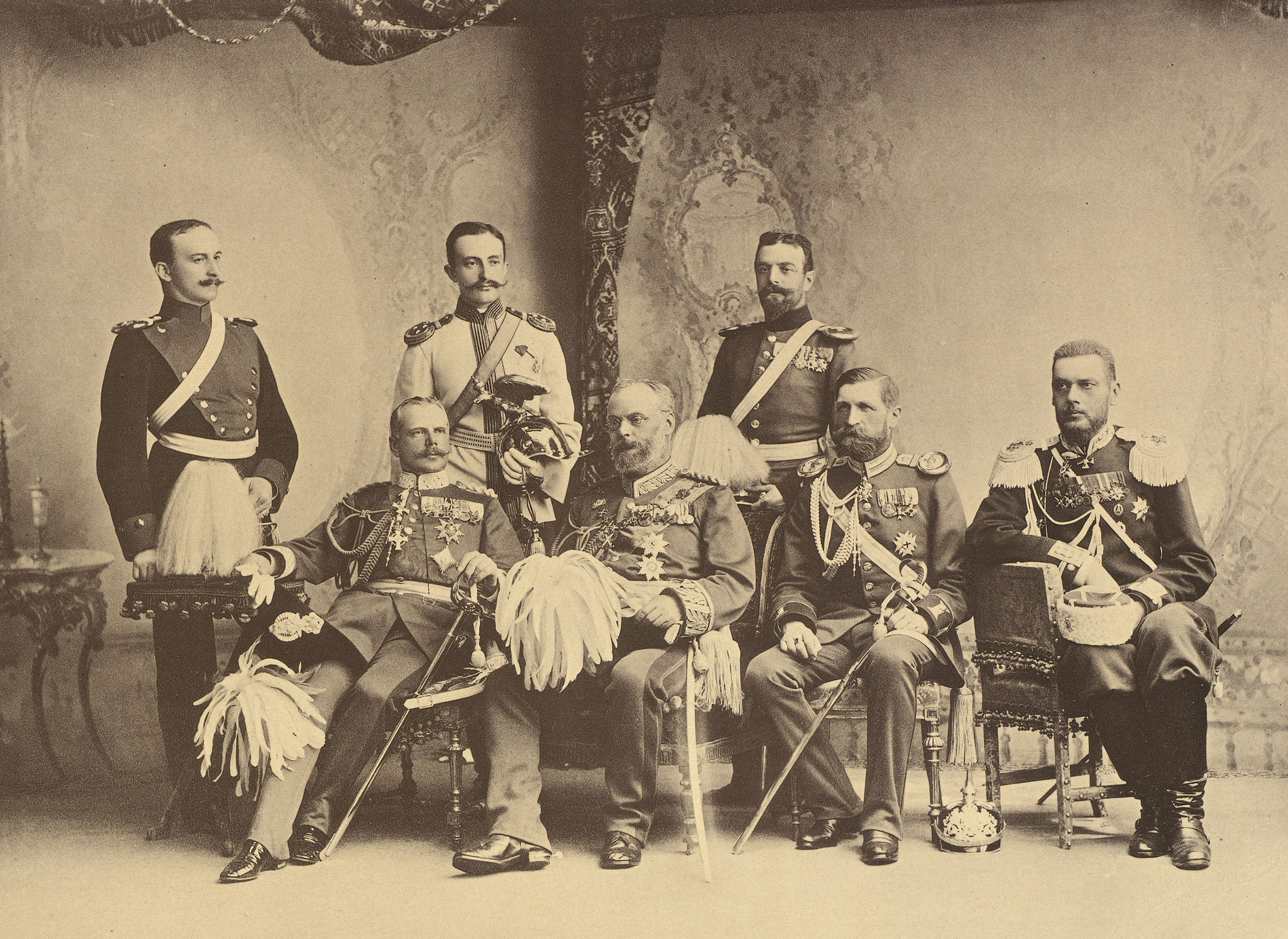
Bavaria

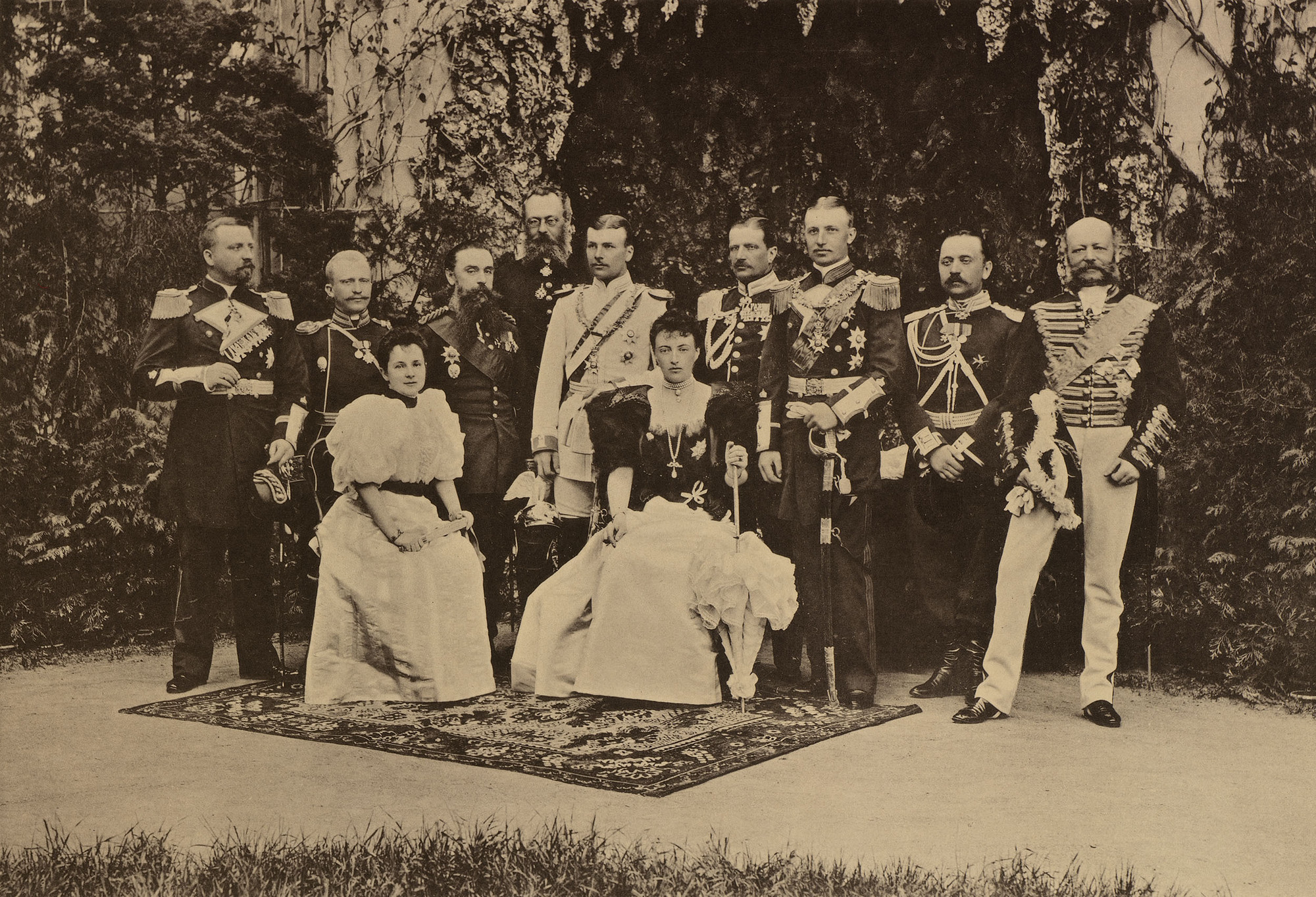
Mecklenburg-Schwerin

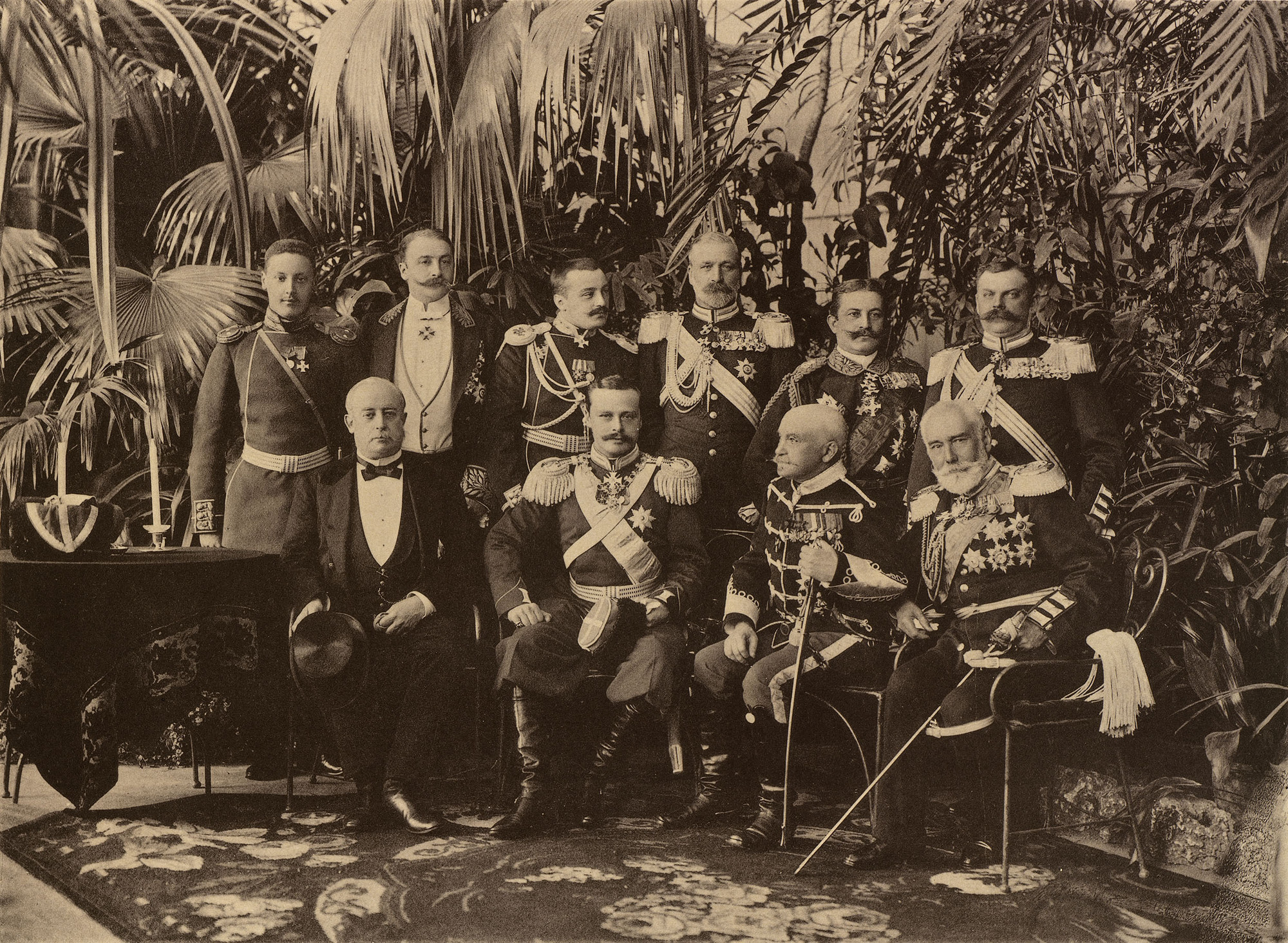
Hesse and Rhine

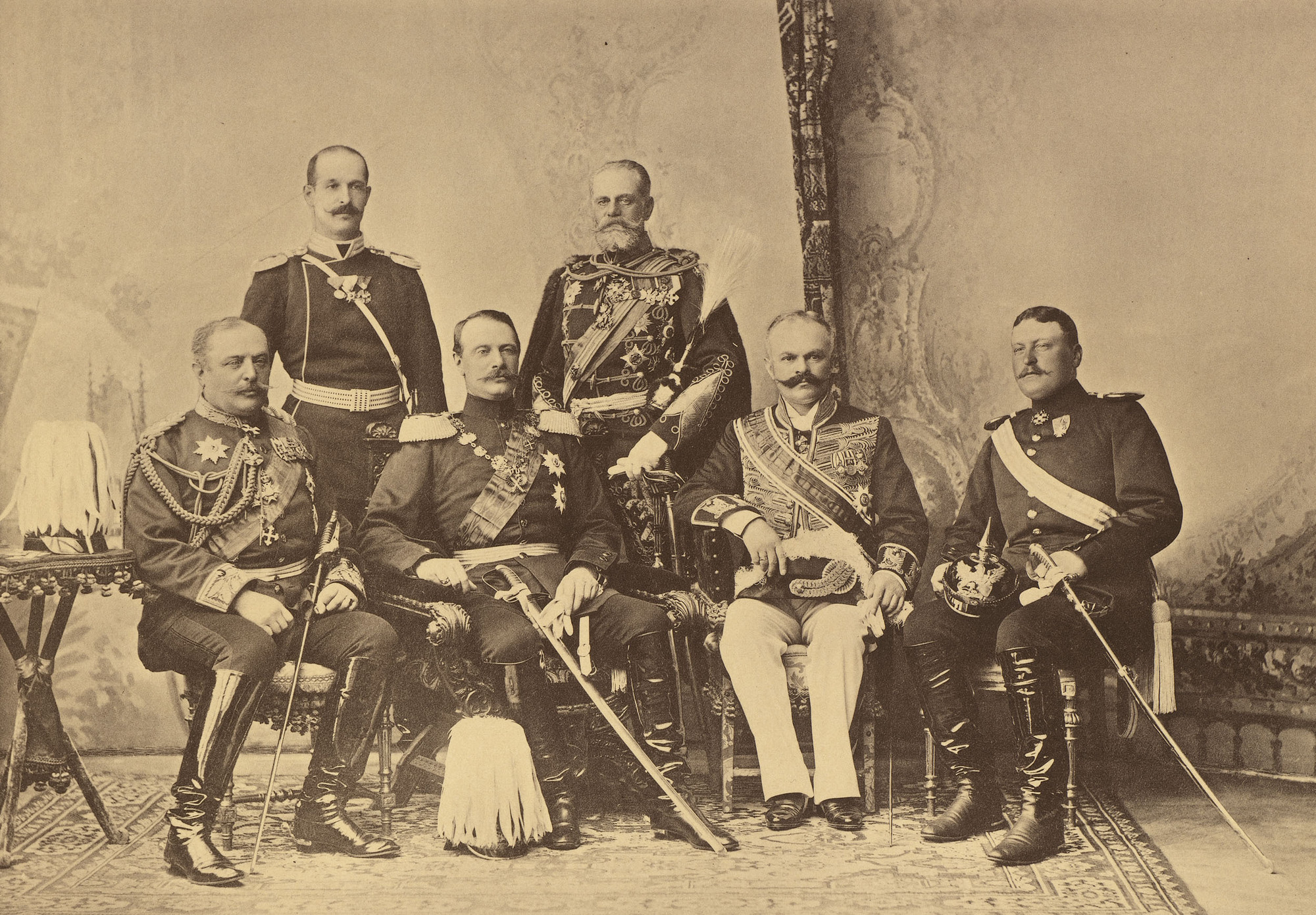
Baden

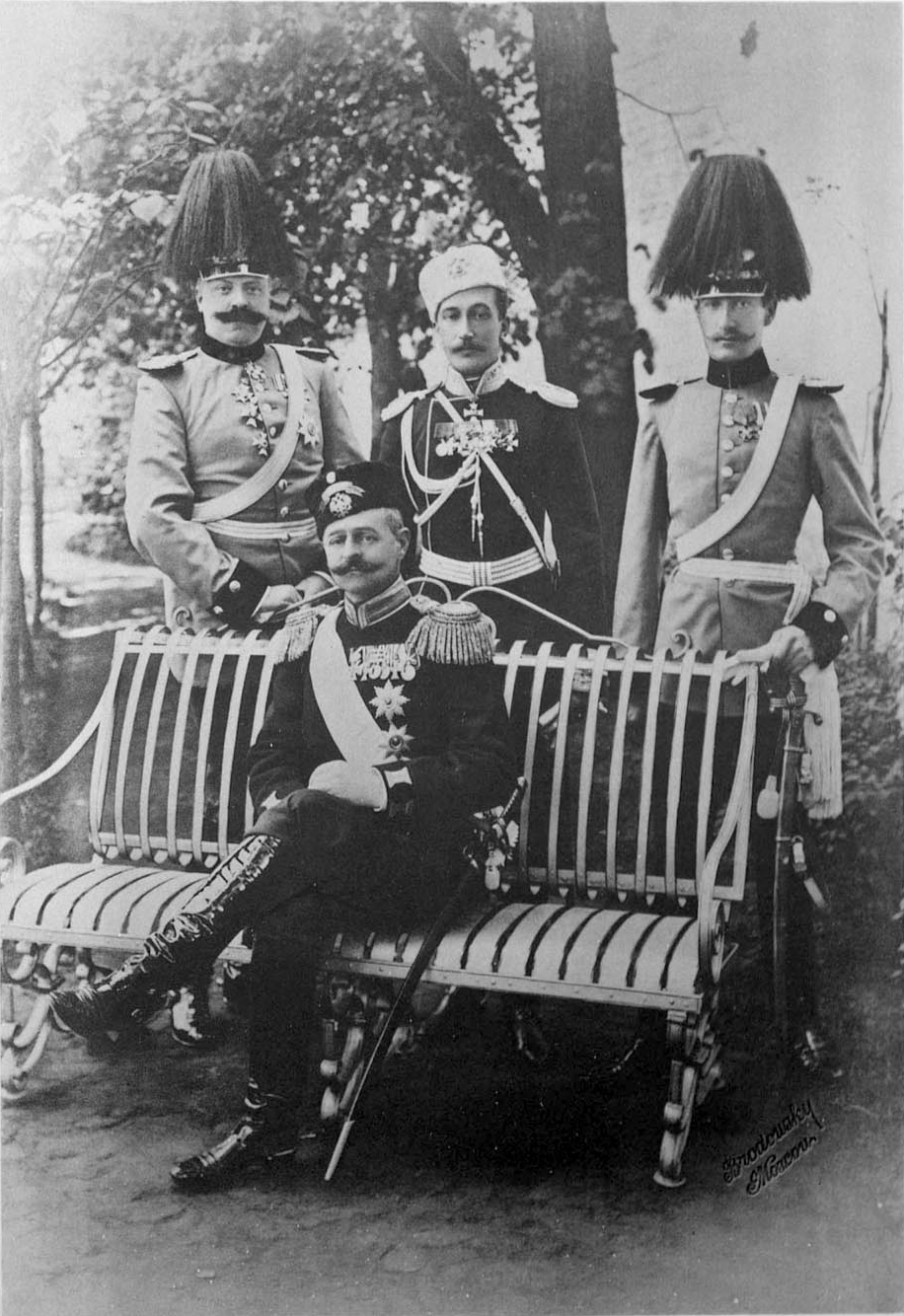
Oldenburg

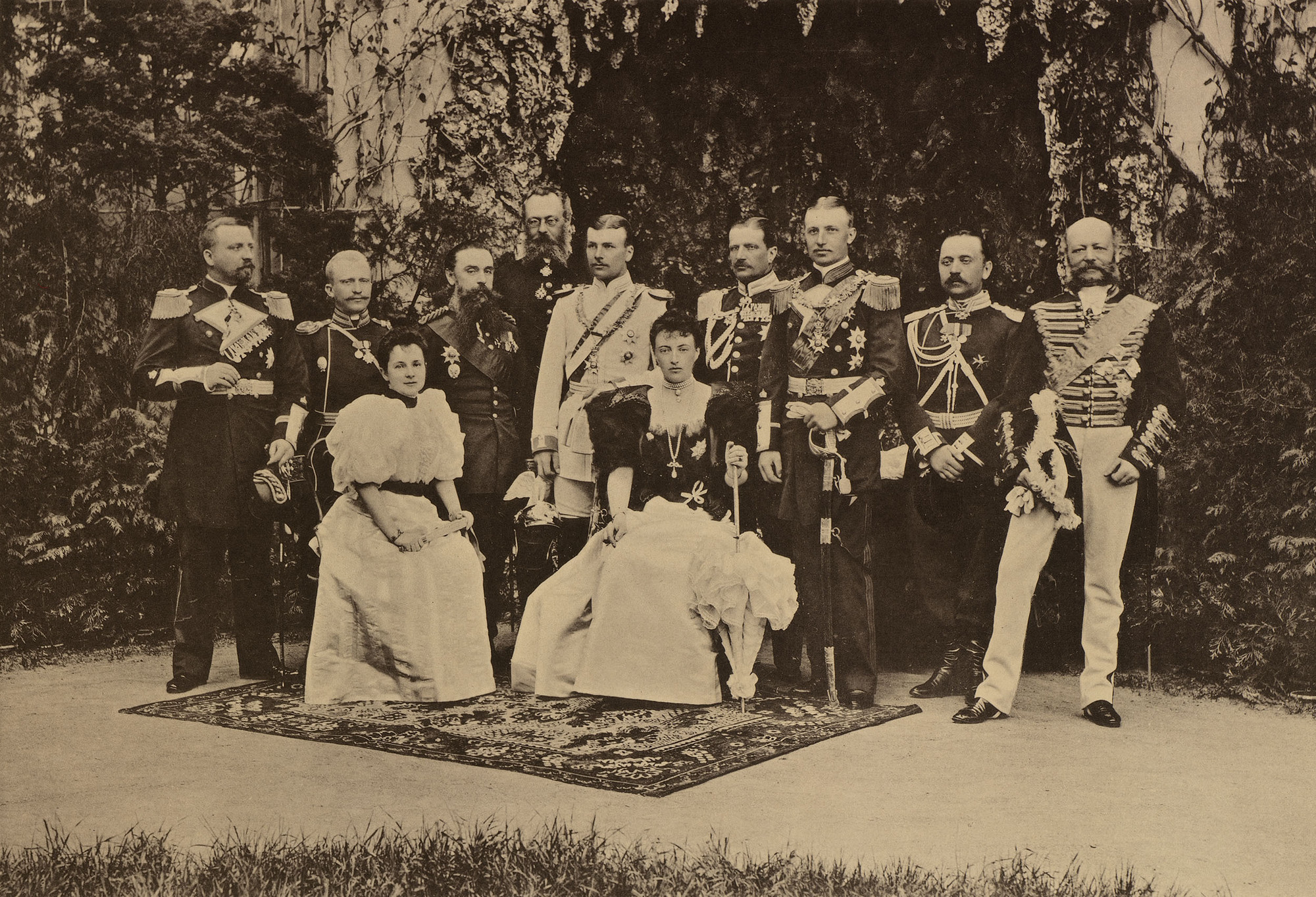
Mecklenburg-Schwerin

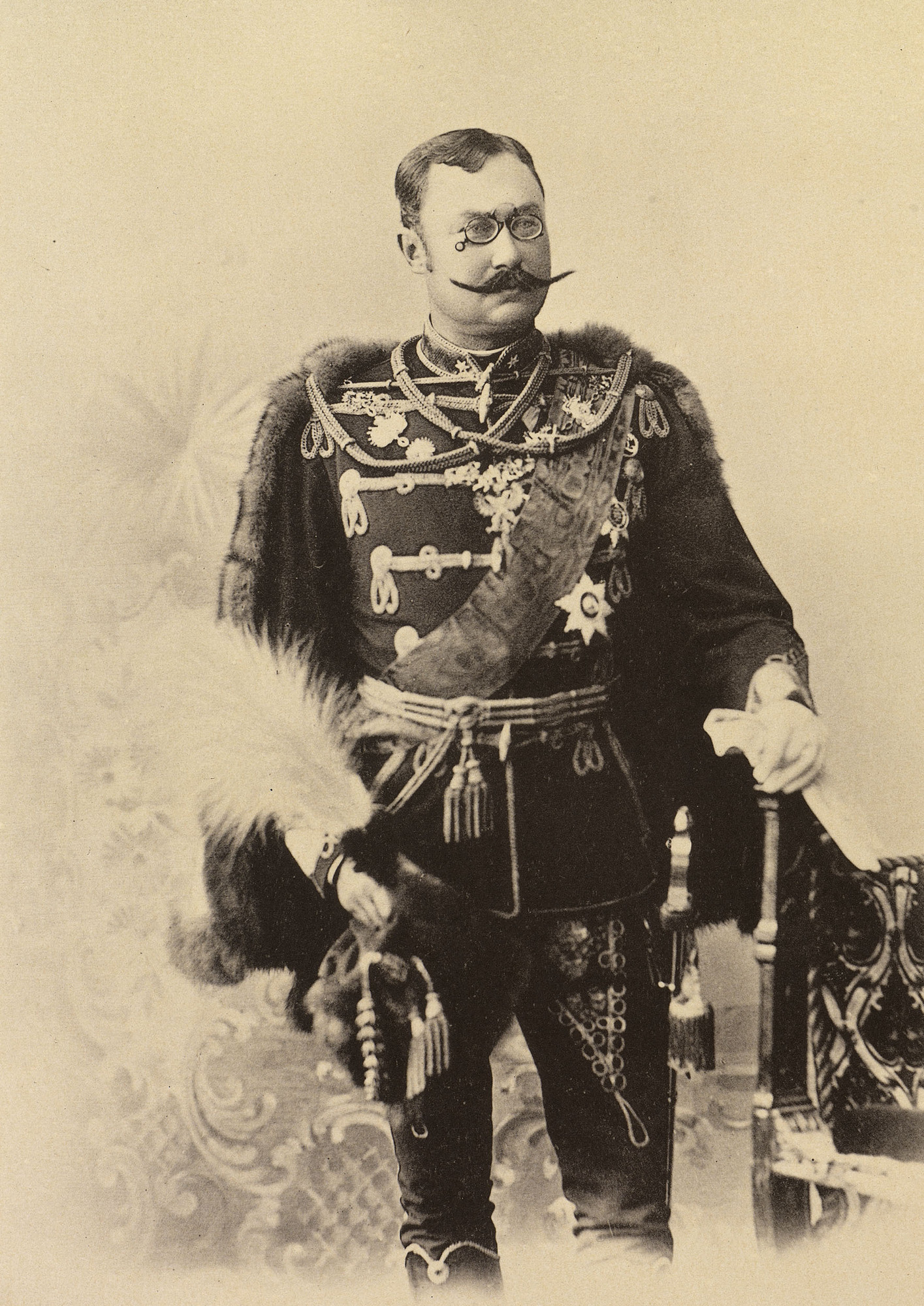
Luxembourg

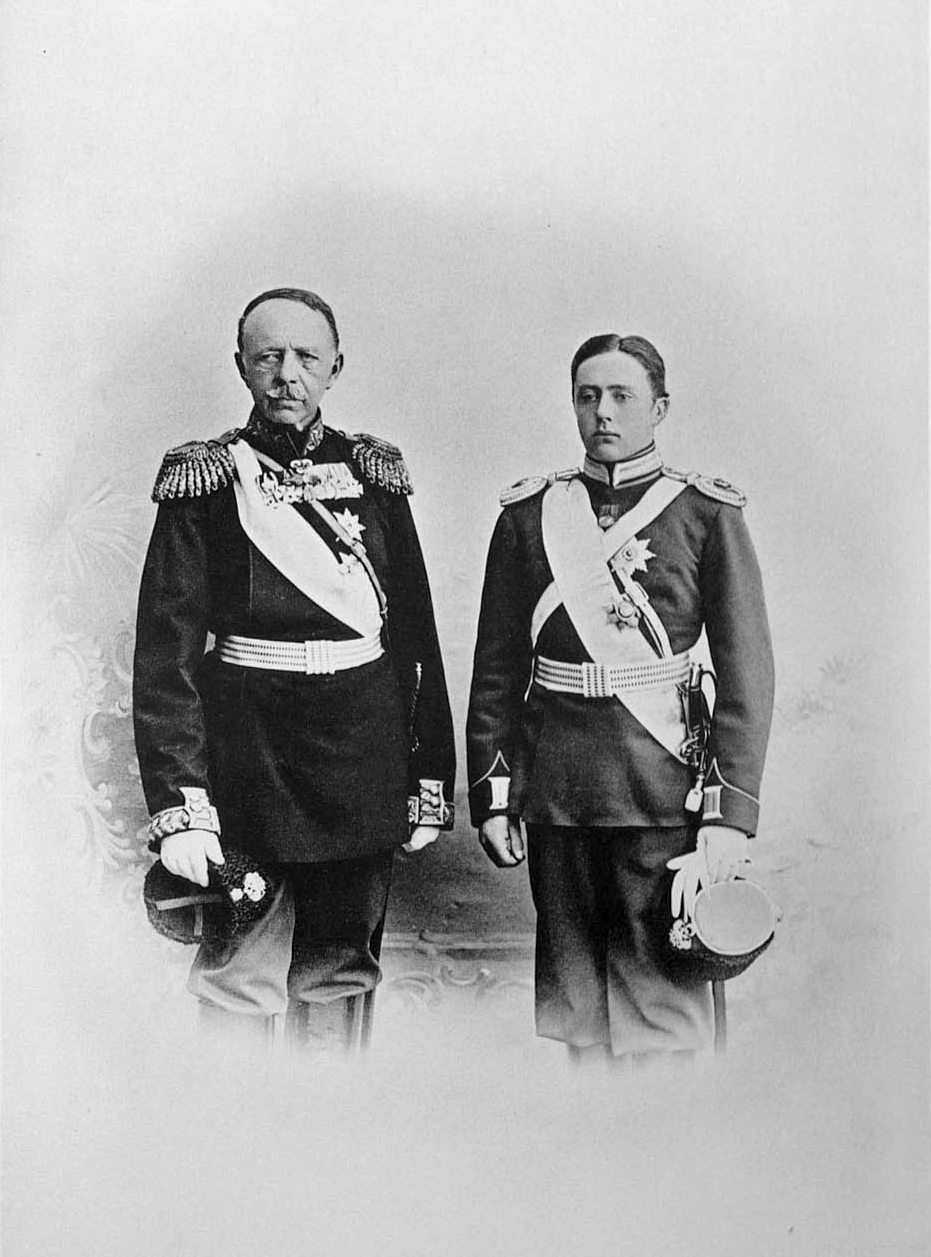
Saxe-Weimar-Eisenach

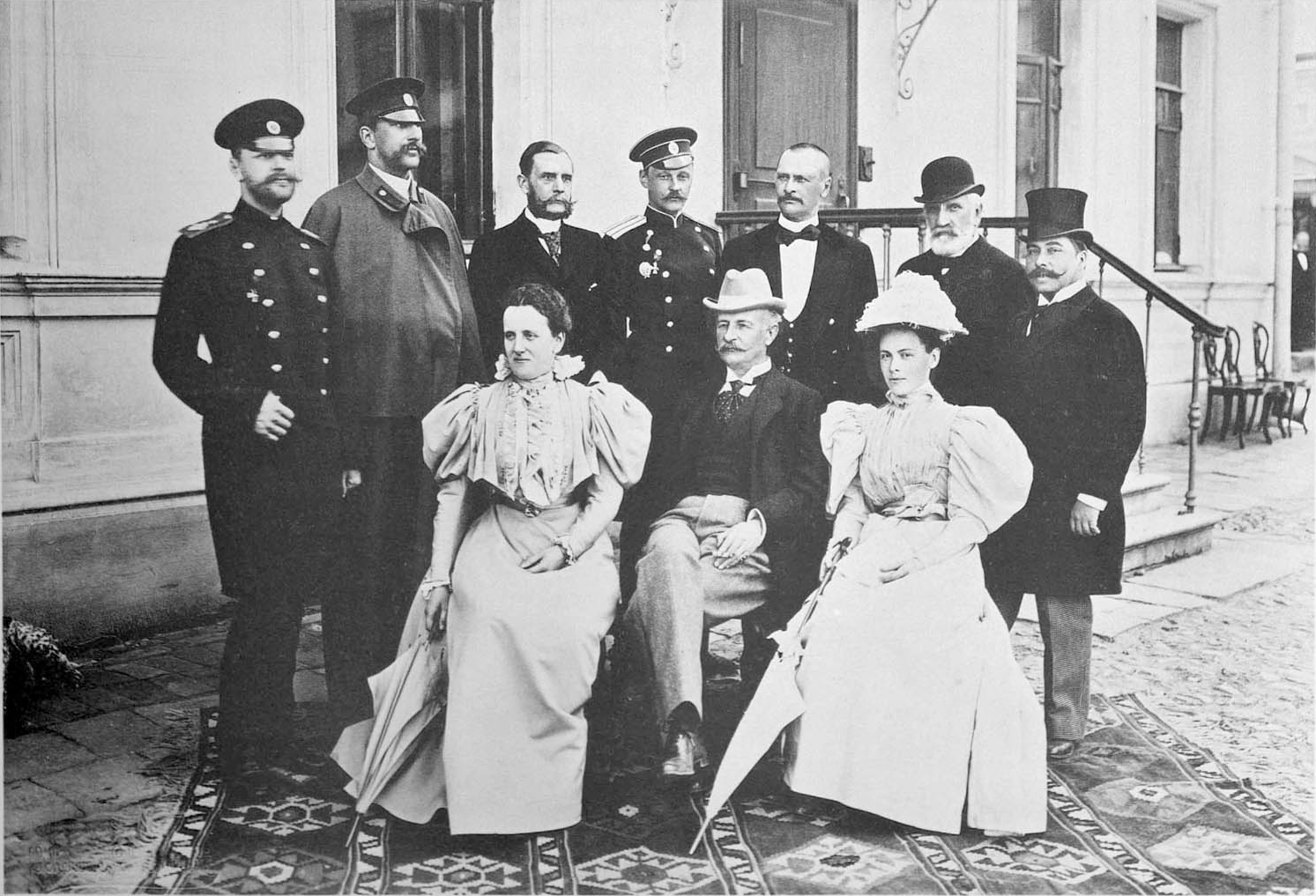
Saxe-Altenburg

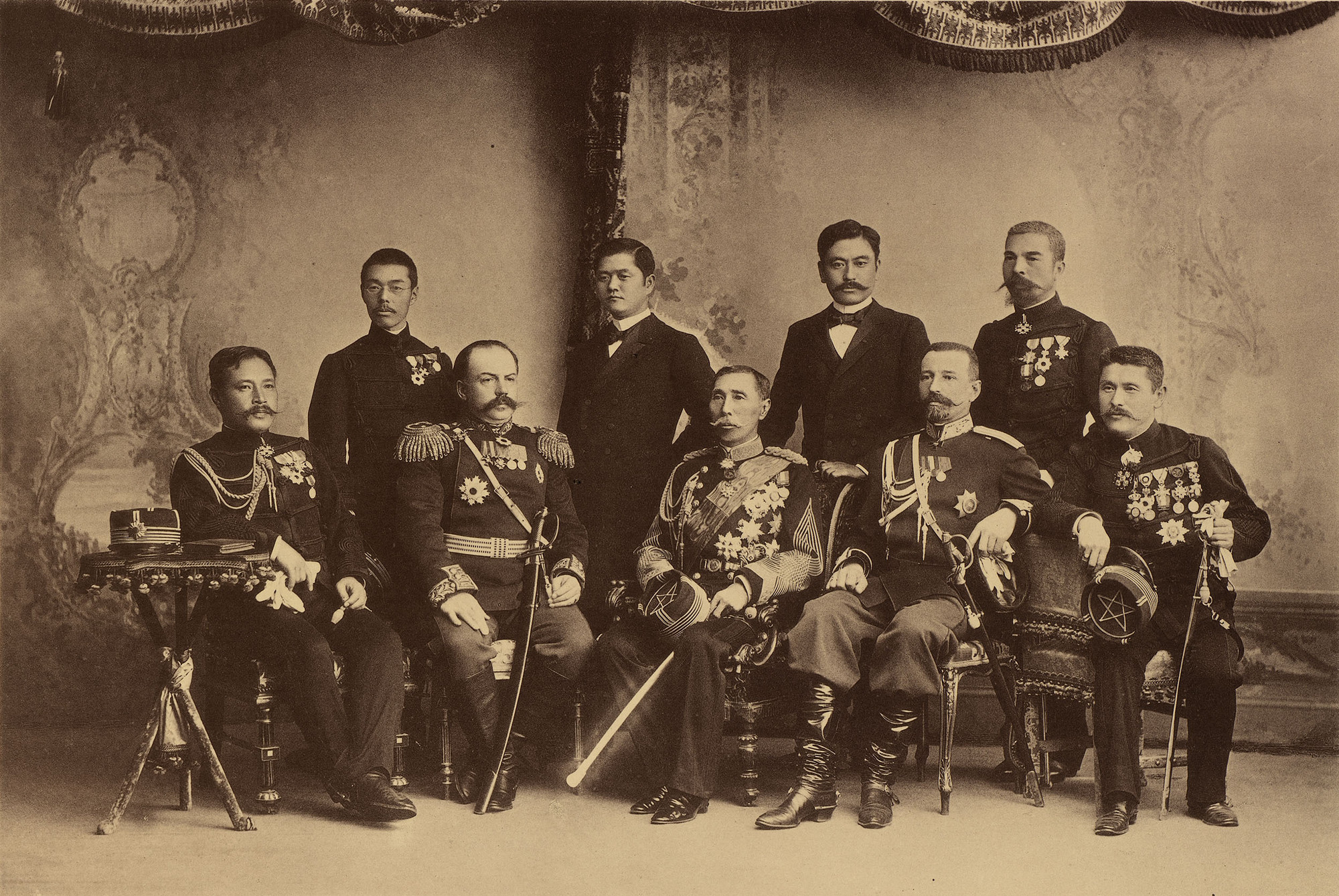
Japan

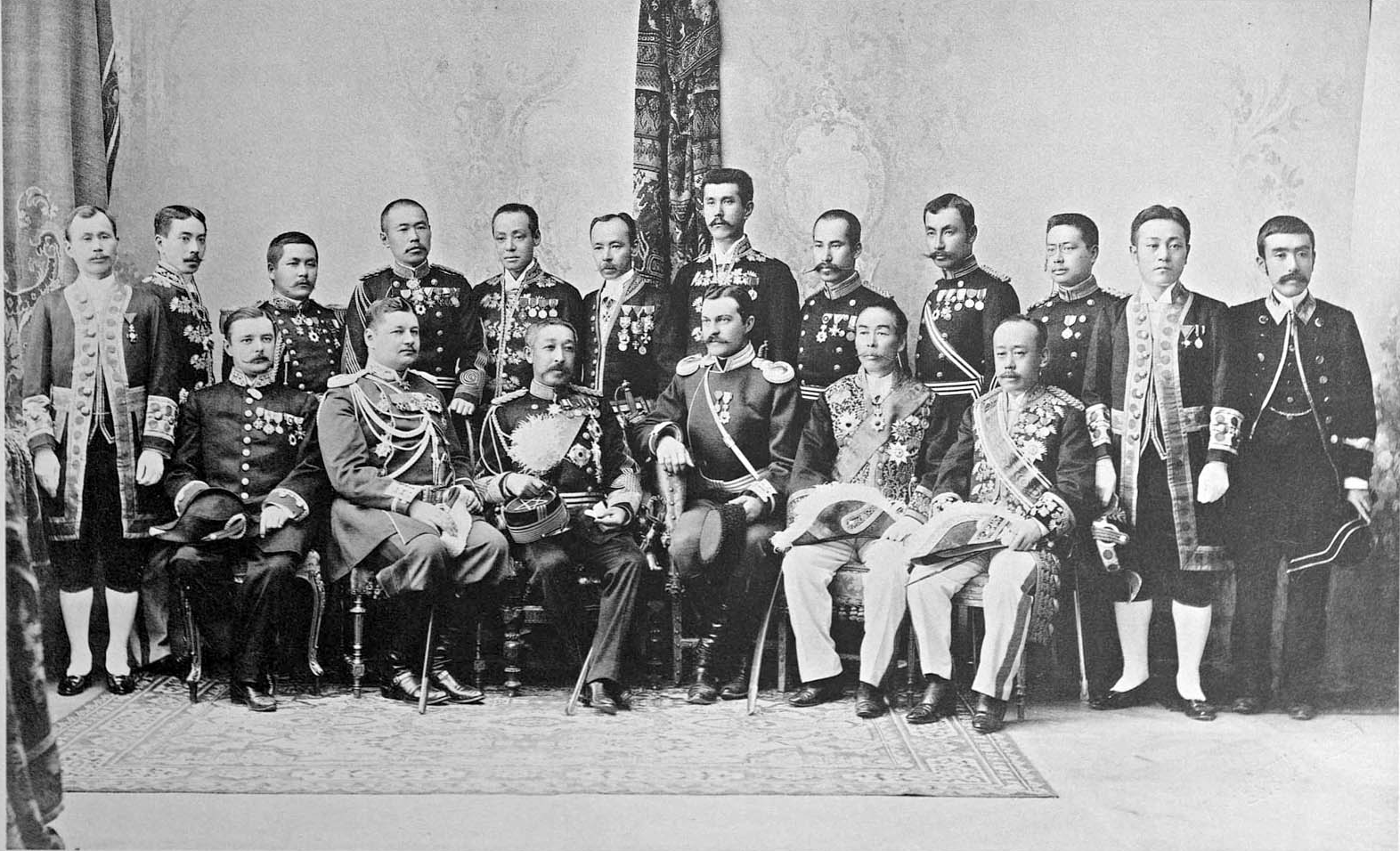
Japan

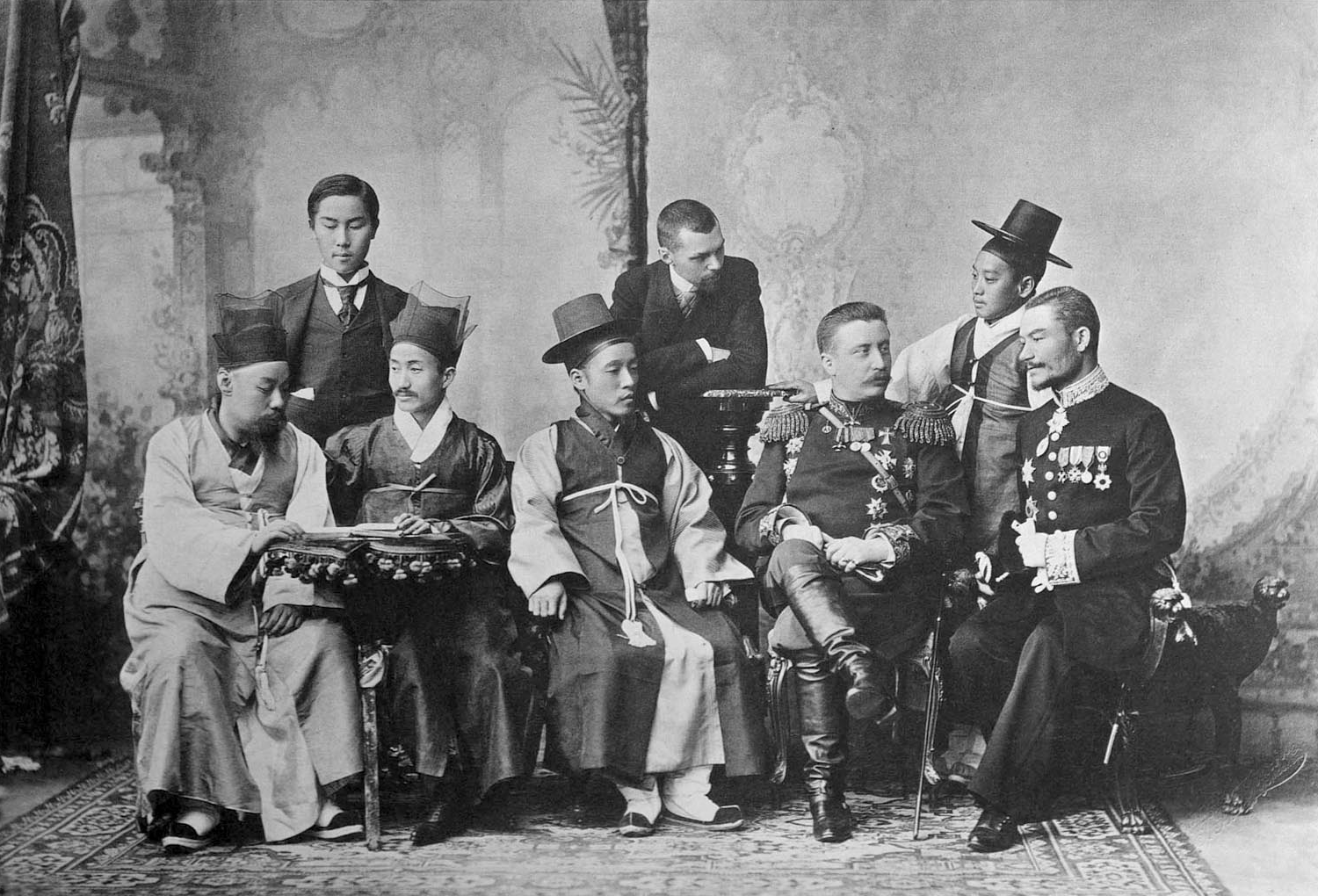
Korea

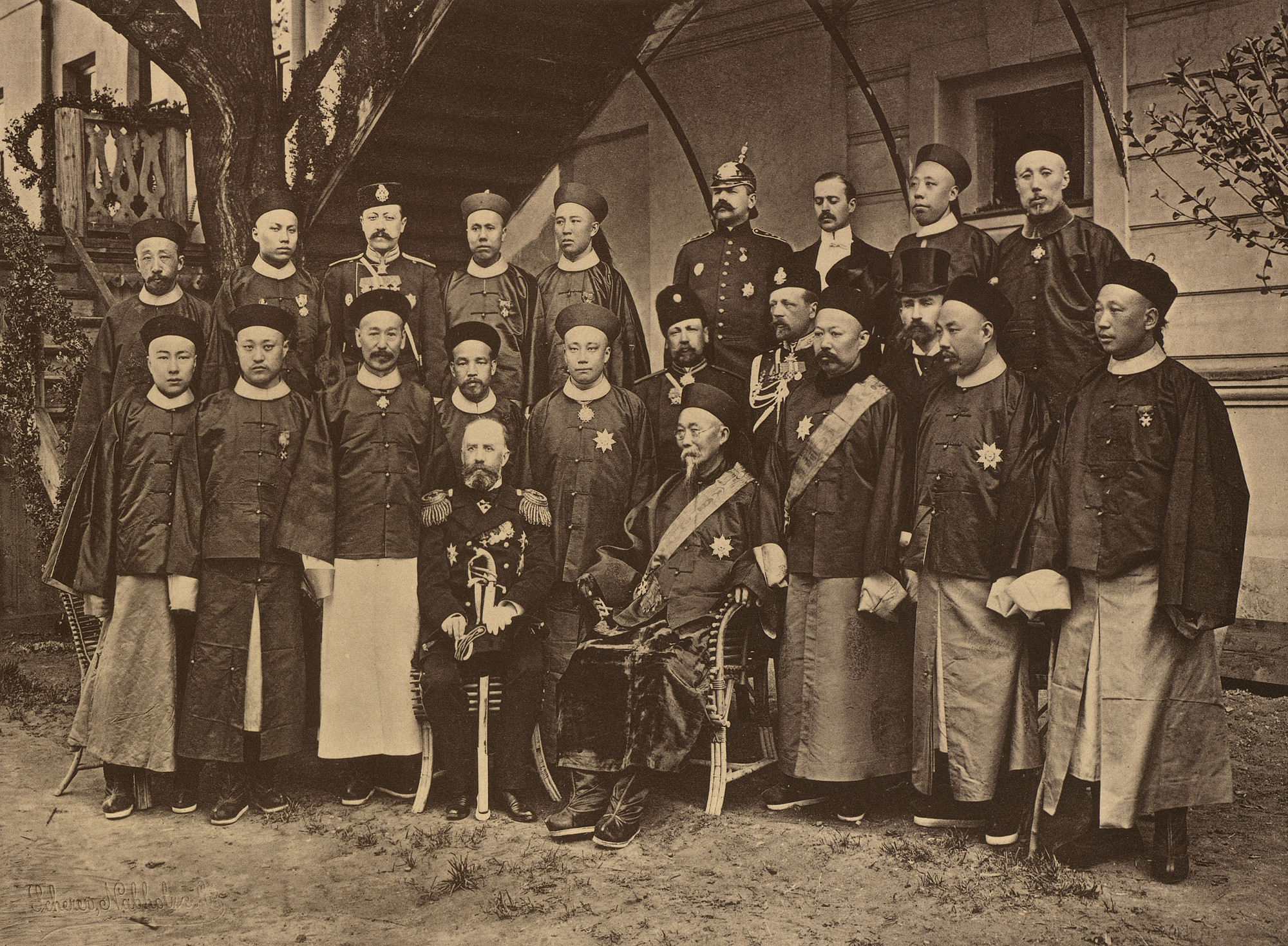
Qing of Imperial China

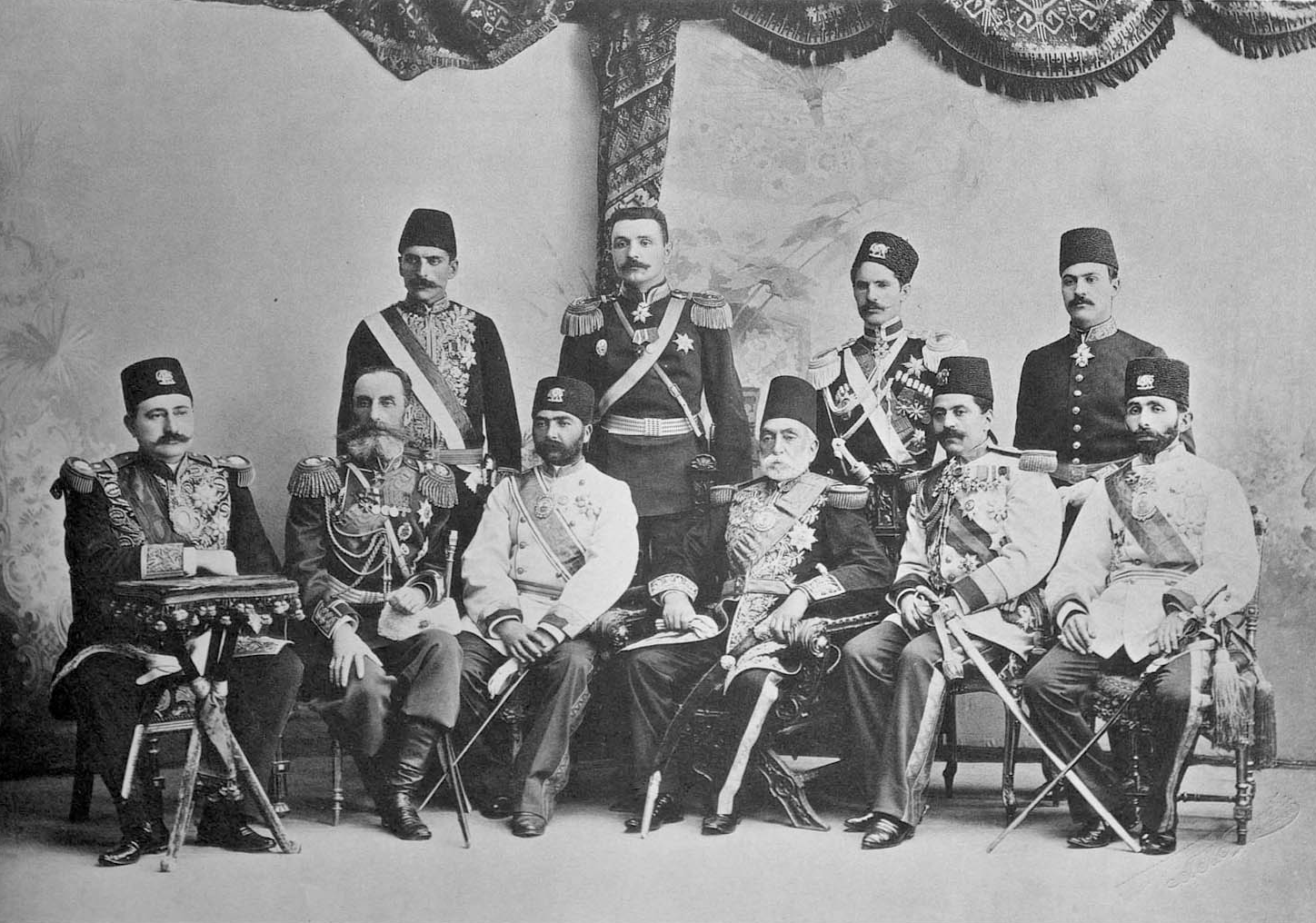
Qajar Iran

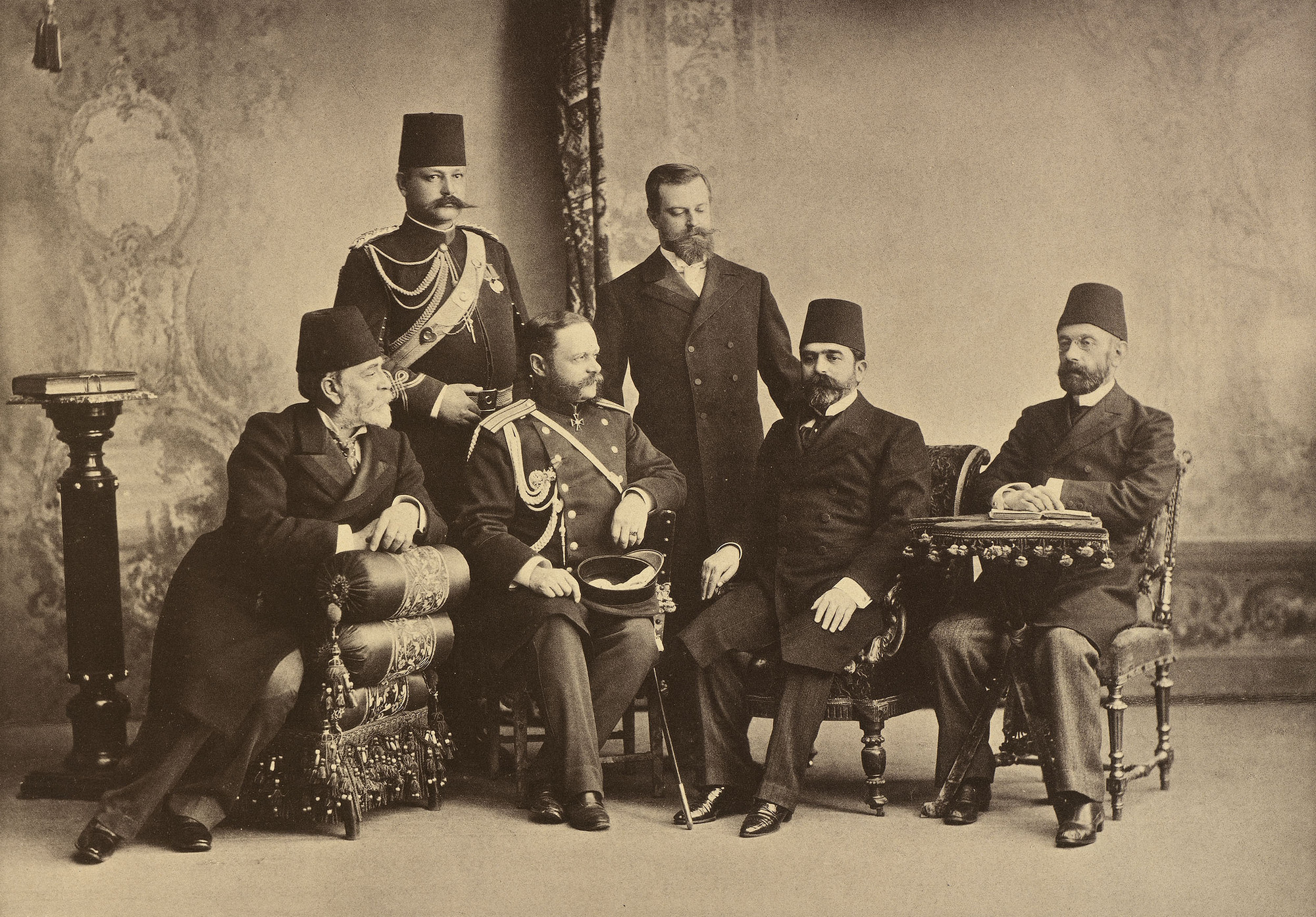
Ottoman Turkey

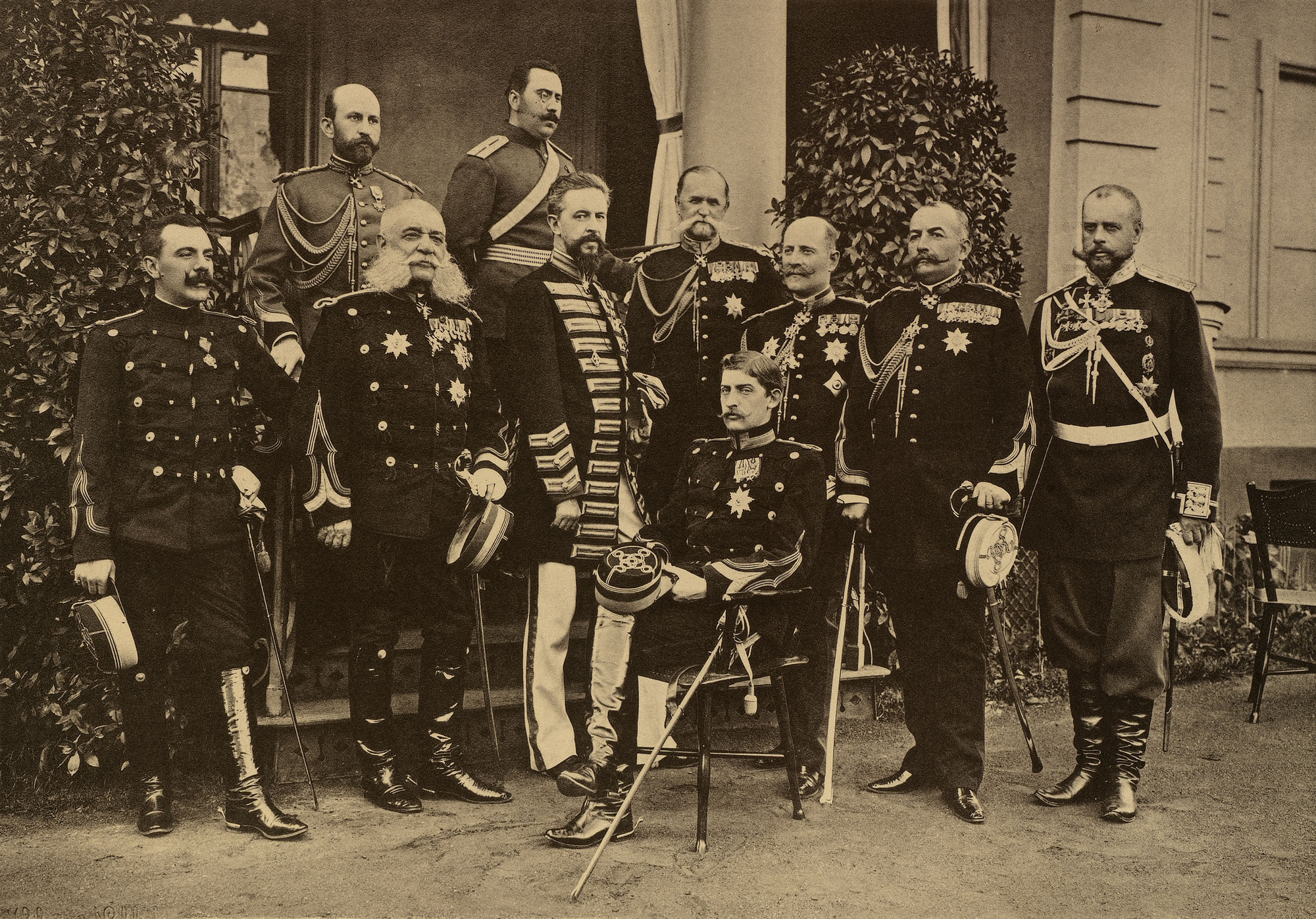
Romania

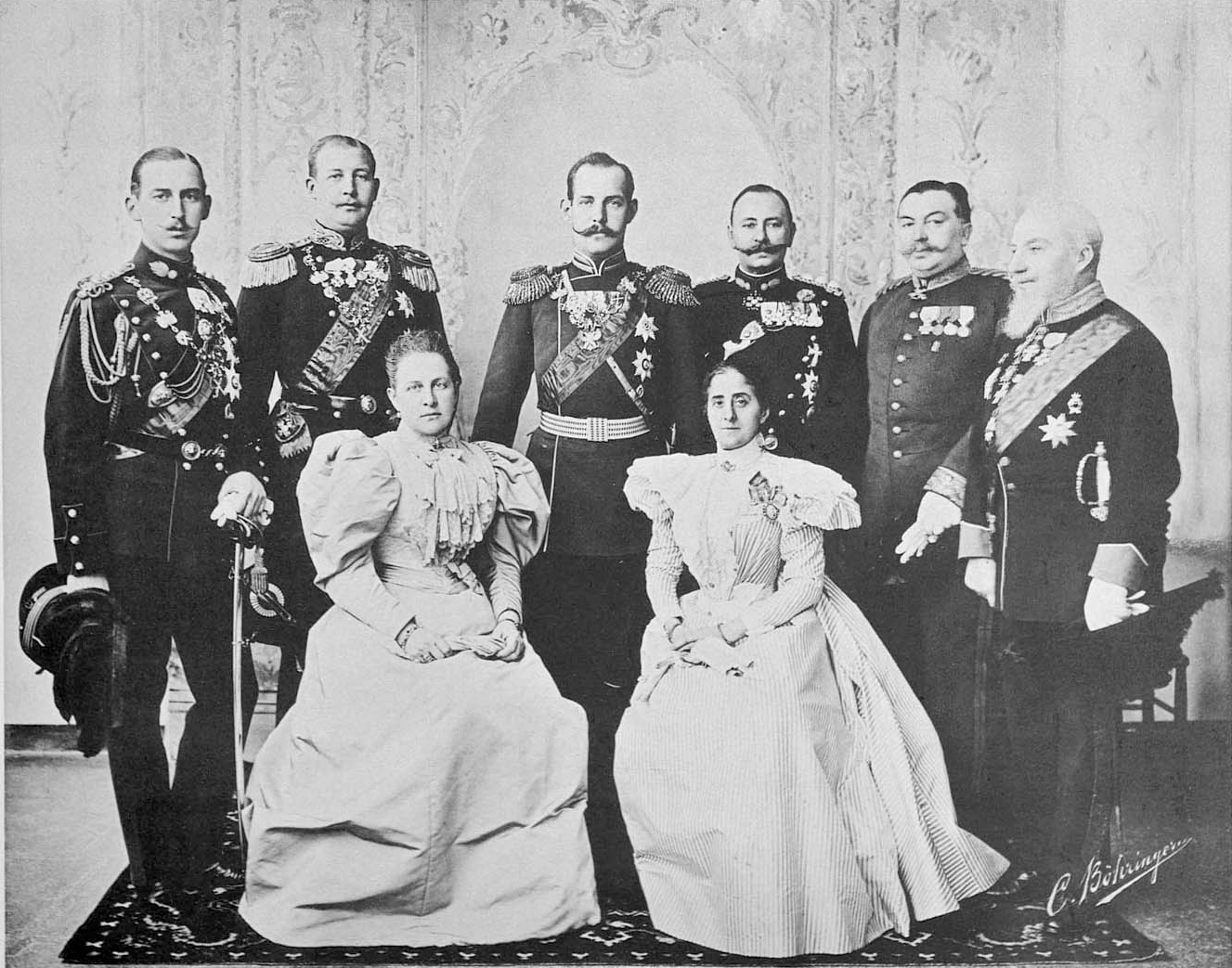
Greece

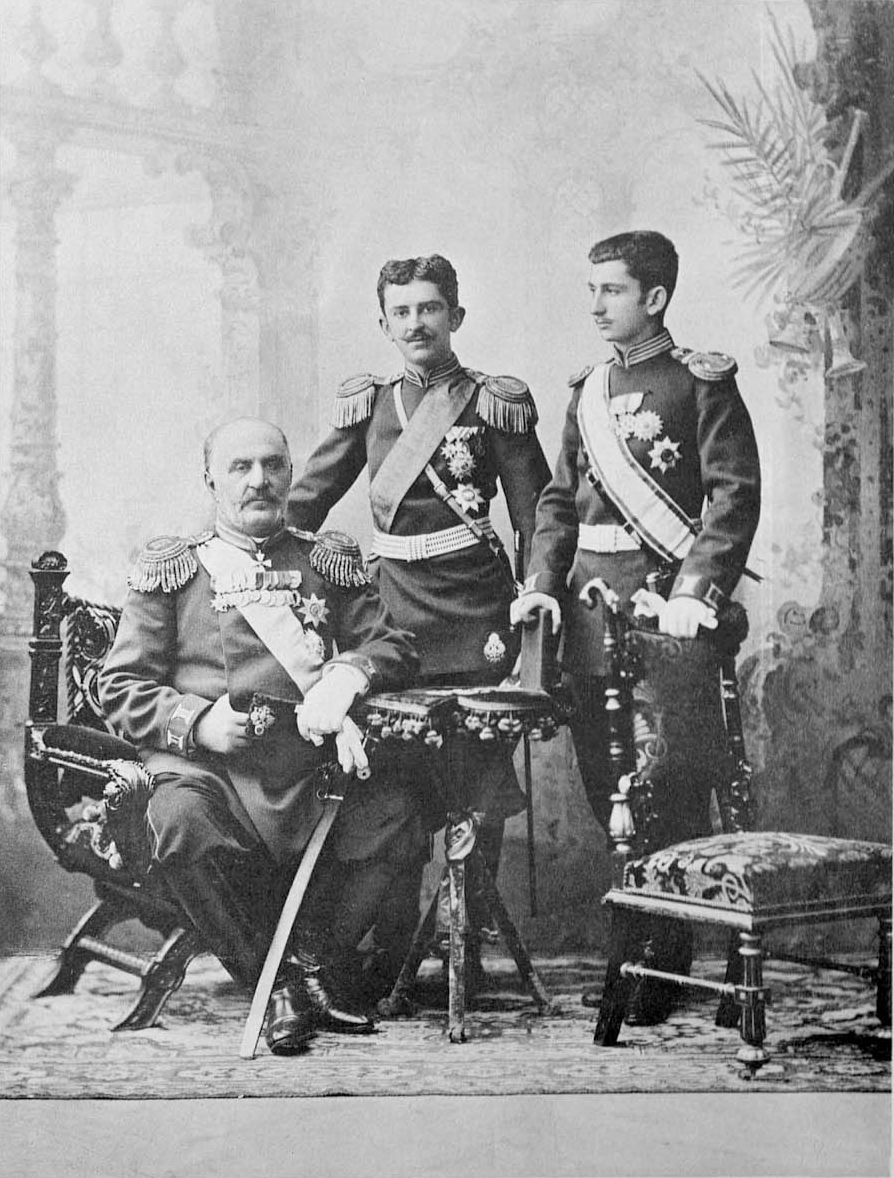
Montenegro

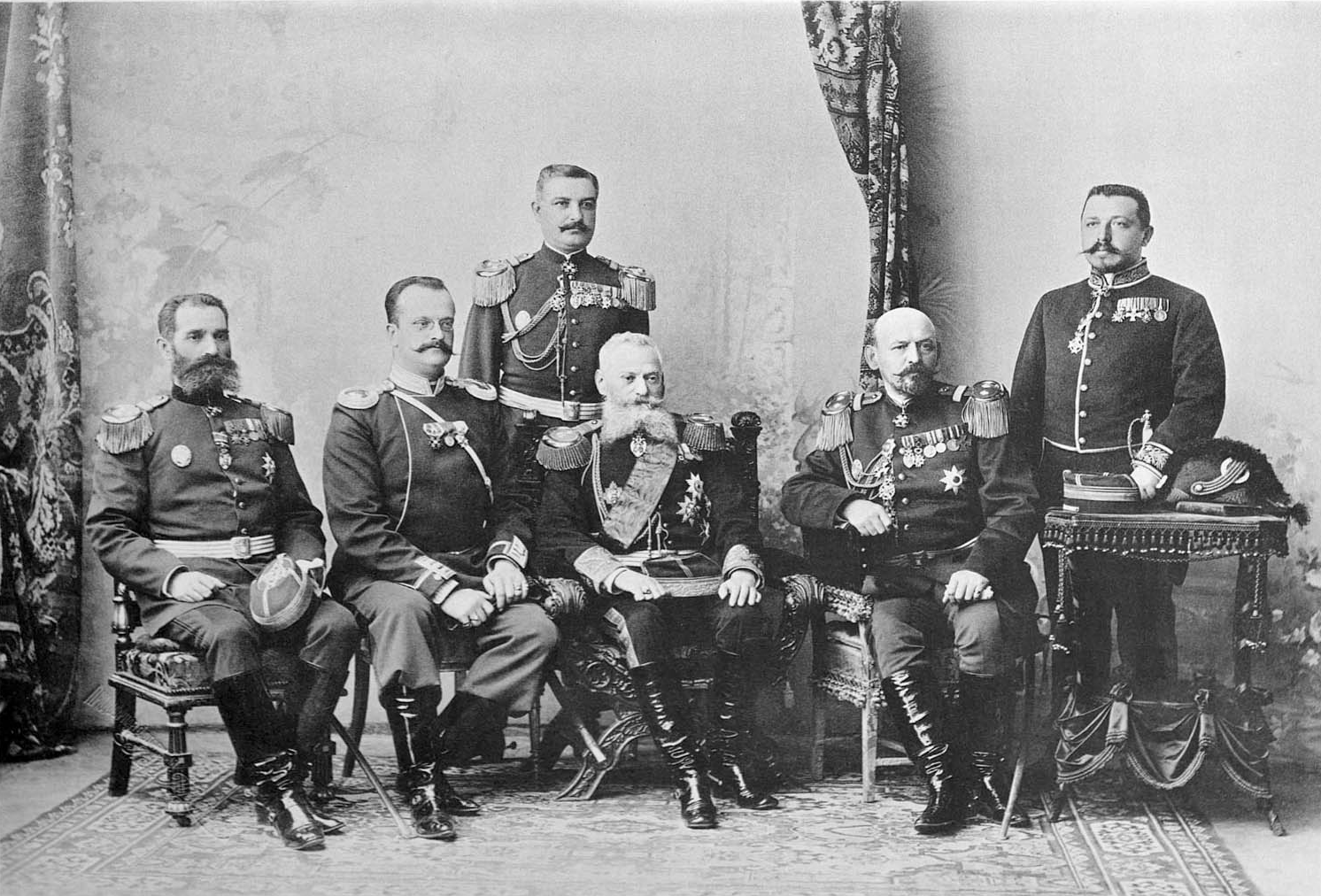
Serbia

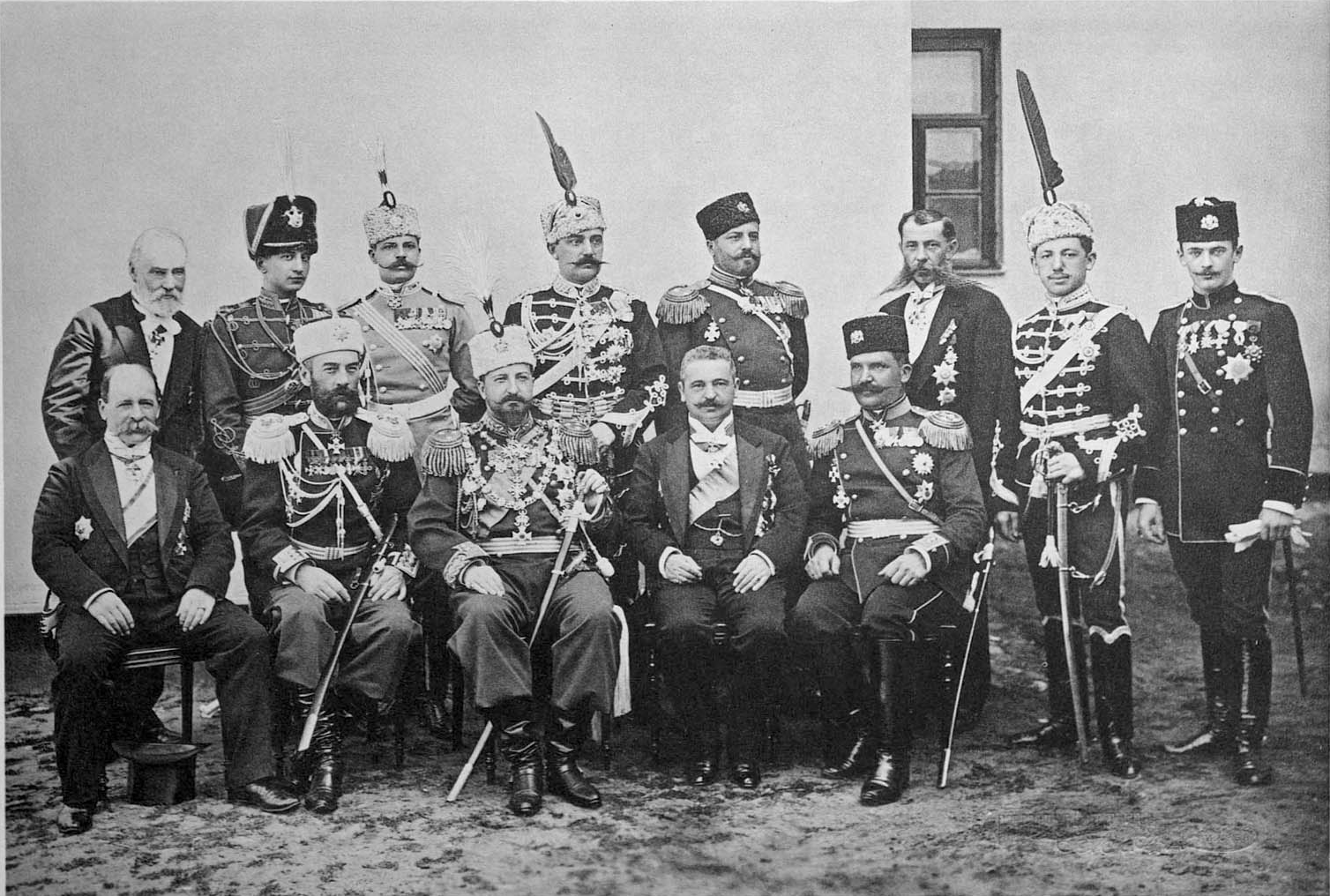
Bulgaria

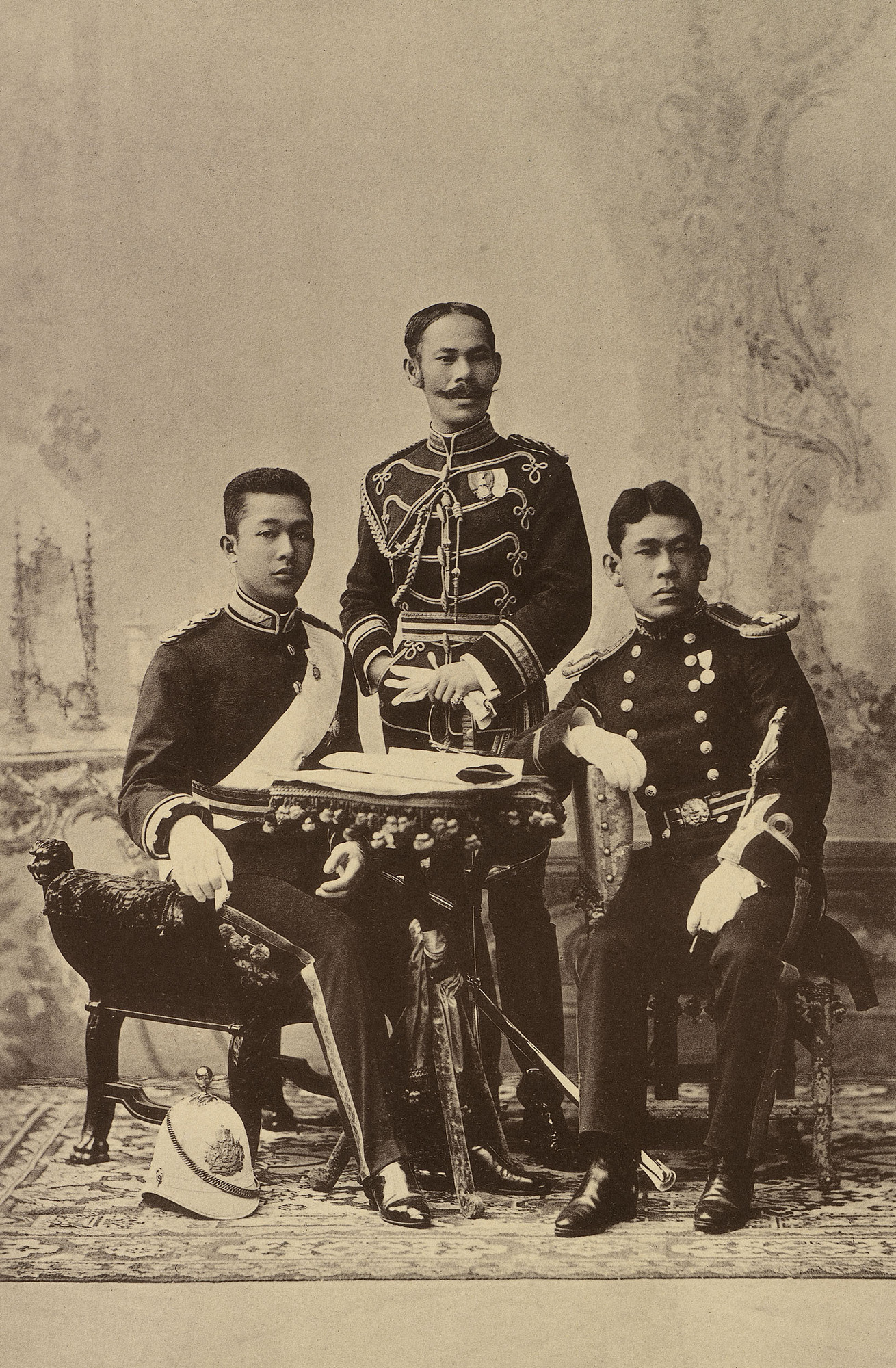
Siam (Thailand)

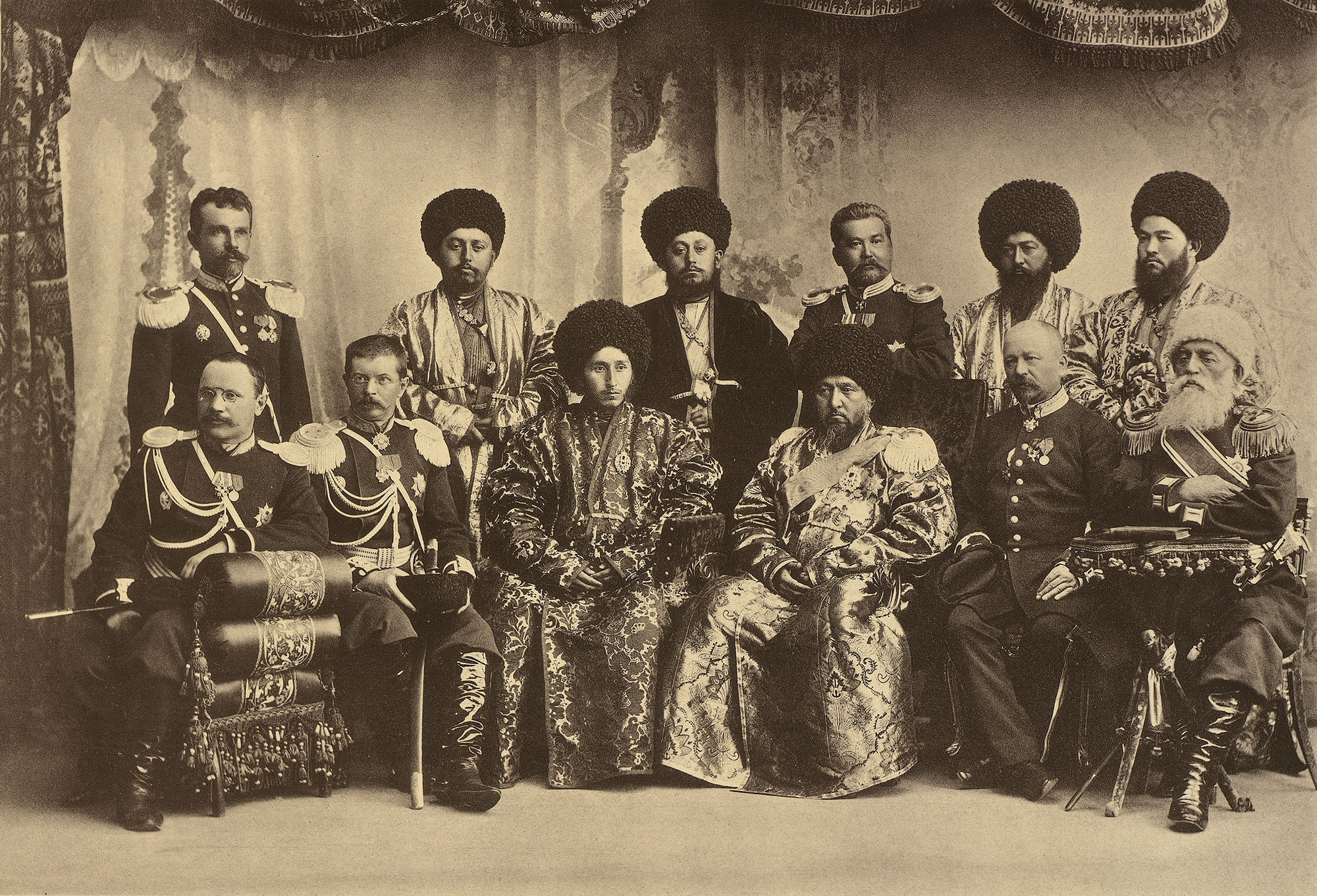
Khanate of Khiva

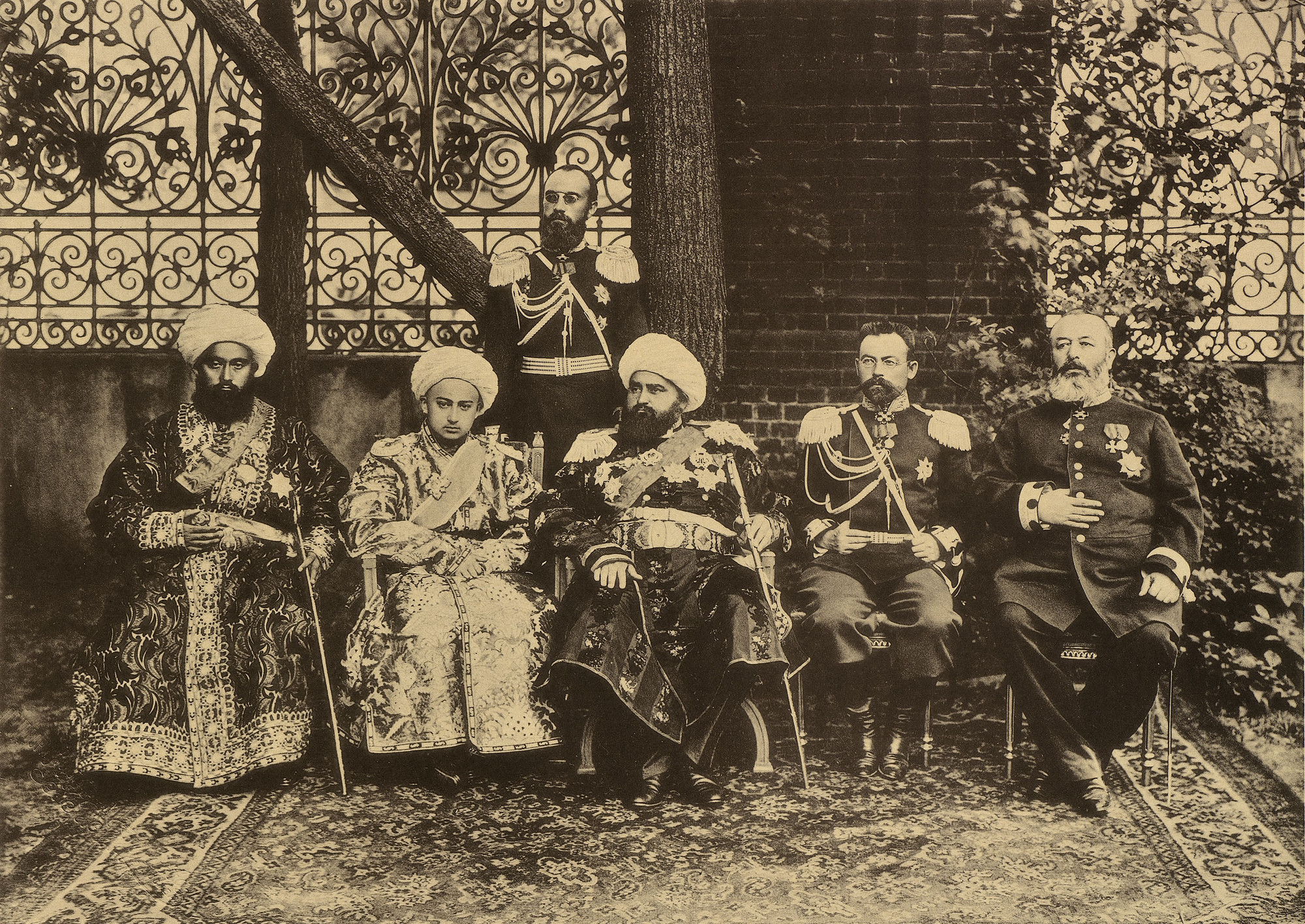
Emirate of Bukhara

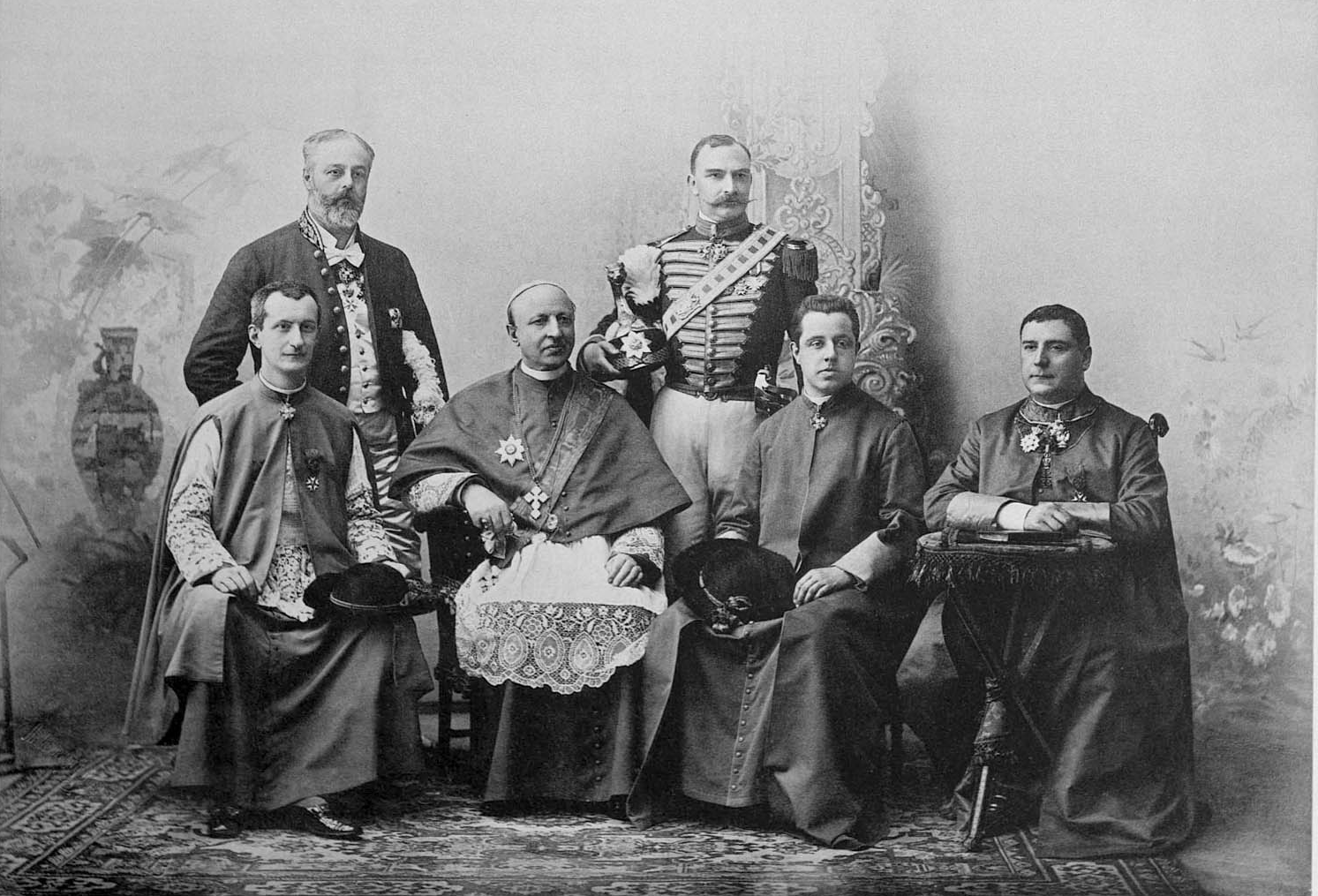
Papacy

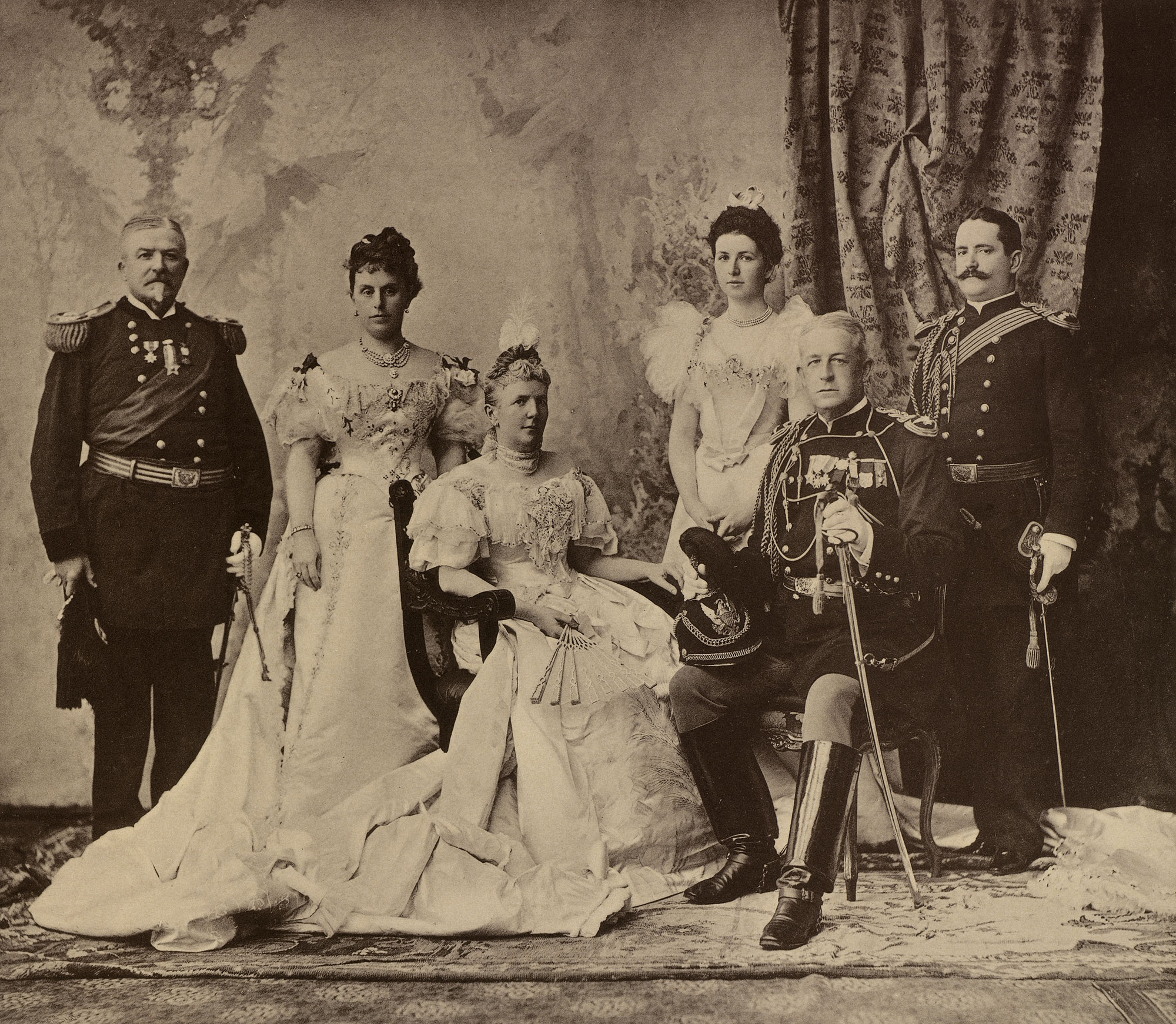
United States of America

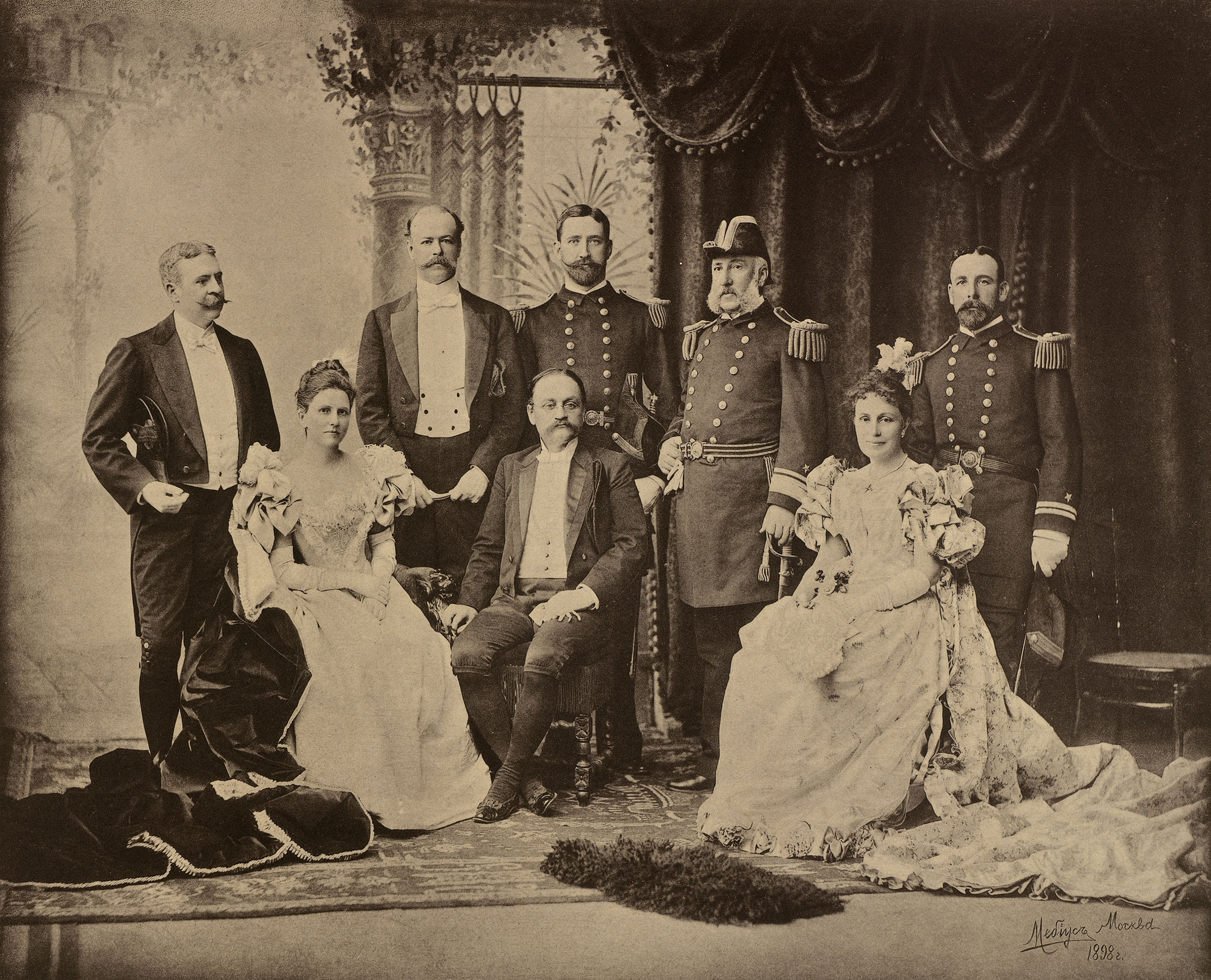
United States of America

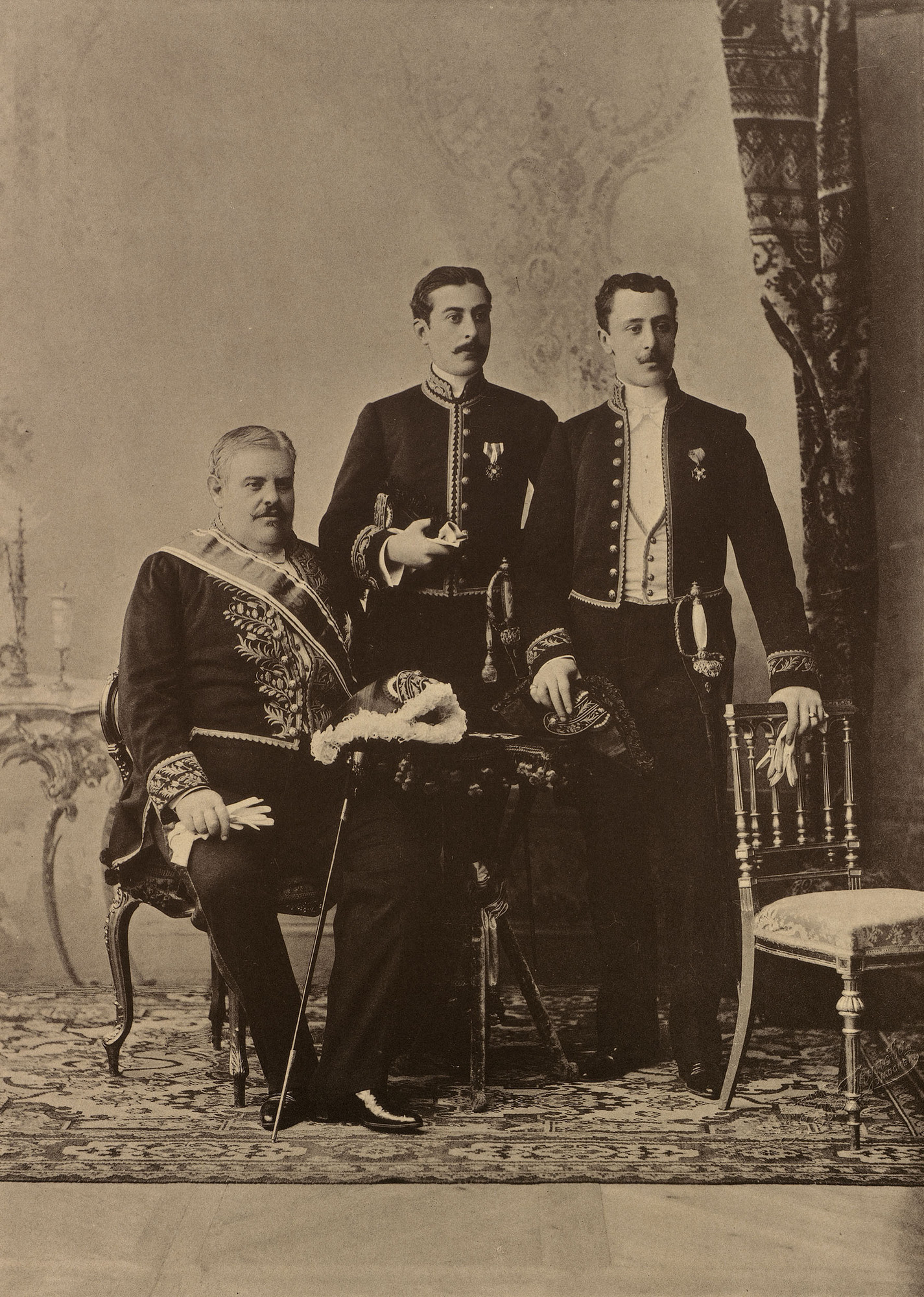
Mexico
