= Dynastic order =

Order distributed by the head of a former royal family

A dynastic order, monarchical order, or house order is an honorific distinction under royal patronage. This type of order is bestowed by a reigning sovereign or by the head of a formerly ruling family, recognized as a legitimate source of honors (fons honorum). These orders are often considered an integral part of the cultural and historical heritage of the ruling family. Traditionally, dynastic orders were created or maintained to reward services rendered to a monarch or their dynasty, thereby strengthening bonds of loyalty and allegiance to the crown.

In parallel, there are national or state orders, which are similar distinctions (such as orders of merit) conferred by sovereign states but not under the authority of a ruling dynasty. These national orders are typically awarded by governments or republican institutions to honor exceptional contributions to the nation, whether in the fields of politics, culture, science, or society.

While dynastic orders are deeply rooted in monarchical history and traditions, national orders reflect the values and priorities of a modern state. These two types of distinctions often coexist, illustrating the diversity of honorific systems around the world.

== In personal gift of sovereign ==
Dynastic orders are under the exclusive control of a monarch and are bestowed without the advice of the political leadership (prime minister or cabinet). A recent report by the British Government mentioned that there is "one remaining exercise that has been identified of the Monarch's truly personal, executive prerogative: that is, the conferment of certain honours that remain within [the Sovereign’s] gift (the Orders of Merit, of the Garter, of the Thistle and the Royal Victorian Order)."

Generally, dynastic or house Orders are granted by the monarch for whatever reason the monarch may deem appropriate whereas other orders, often called Merit Orders, are granted on the recommendation of government officials to recognize individual accomplishments or services to the nation.

=== Portugal ===
The term dynastic order is also used for those orders that continue to be bestowed by former monarchs and their descendants after they have been removed from power. For instance, the website of Duarte Pio de Bragança, a pretender to the throne of Portugal using the title Duke of Braganza, asserts that the Order of the Immaculate Conception of Vila Viçosa, "being a Dynastic Order of the House of Bragança and not an Order of State, continued to be conferred by the last King Dom Manuel II, in the exile." On the basis of his succession to King Manuel II, Duarte Pio continues to award those orders of the Kingdom of Portugal not taken over by the Portuguese Republic.

The Portuguese Republic views things somewhat differently, regarding all the royal orders as extinct following the 5 October 1910 revolution with some of them revived in republican form in 1918. For official purposes, Portugal simply ignores the orders awarded by the royal pretender, Duarte Pio. Although no one is prosecuted for accepting orders from Dom Duarte, including himself, Portuguese law requires government permission to accept any official award, either from Portugal or foreign powers; the awards of Dom Duarte simply do not appear anywhere on either list.

=== Italy ===
A similar situation exists in Italy, where the Republican Government regards the orders of the former kings to have been abolished but the last king's heir continues to award them. However, the Italian situation is unique, since the Order of Saints Maurice and Lazarus is one of the few orders of knighthood that has been explicitly recognized by a papal bull, in which Pope Gregory XII gave the House of Savoy the right to confer that knighthood in perpetuity. Thus, under principles of international law, the Italian heir to the throne in exile asserts that control of the Savoy dynastic orders exists separate from the Kingdom of Italy so that he retains the right to award the orders, and accompanying privileges." The royal family of Savoy additionally have the Supreme Order of the Most Holy Annunciation which is their highest ranked order of Knighthood. In addition to this the Order of Merit of Savoy is a Dynastic order knighthood given out by the head of the Royal House of Savoy, Order of chivalry. Following the demise of the last reigning monarch Umberto II of Italy in 1983, the Order of the Crown of Italy was replaced in 1988 by the Order of Merit of Savoy which was instituted by his heir, the current head of the former Royal House, Vittorio Emanuele, Prince of Naples. While the Ordine al merito d'Savoia it has never been a national order, it is subsidiary to the Civil Order of Savoy which was the Order of Merit and it has around 2,000 members and, as with the Order of the Crown of Italy previously, it is entrusted to the Chancellor of the Order of Saints Maurice and Lazarus.

In addition to this Italy contains orders of the royal House of Bourbon-Two Sicilies which still confer their Dynastic Knightly orders. The most interesting of which is the Sacred Military Constantinian Order of Saint George because the Italian Republic recognises the order as an Order of Chivalry under Law n° 178 of 1951 authorises the Italian citizens awarded with the Constantinian decoration to show them as authoritatively recognised also by the Italian State Council in its decision number 1869/81. Therefore those citizens lawfully awarded with Constantinian decorations can ask to use them on the territory of the Italian Republic by Presidential Decree or Decree of the Ministry of Foreign Affairs. By Decree of the President of the Republic, in 1973 the National Italian Association of the Knights of the Sacred Military Constantinian Order of St. George. Additionally there is the Royal Order of Francis I of the Kingdom of the Two Sicilies. One branch of the family (led by Prince Carlo, Duke of Castro) claims that the Order of Francis I was attached to the crown not the state, and thus awards it as a dynastic order. The other branch (led by Infante Carlos, Duke of Calabria) regards the Order of Francis I as a state order that became extinct when the Borbon-Two Sicilies royal family accepted the abolition of their monarchy and the state's inclusion in the Kingdom of Italy.

=== Russia ===
A third situation of mutual co-existence is maintained in Russia, where, since the fall of communism, the orders of Saint Andrew, Saint George, and Saint Catherine have been reinvented as State Orders of Merit of the Russian Federation. However, the Russian Imperial Orders of Saint Andrew, Saint George, Saint Catherine, Saint Anna, Saint Vladimir, and Saint Stanislav have continued to be awarded since the revolution by the successive heads of the Imperial House of Romanov Grand Duke Kirill Vladimirovich, Grand Duke Vladimir Kirillovich, and Grand Duchess Maria Vladimirovna. In addition, Dynastic Orders of Knighthood were revived and new ones created under Grand Duke Kirill (Order of Saint Nicholas the Wonderworker), Grand Duke Vladimir (Order of St. Michael the Archangel), and Grand Duchess Maria Vladimirovna (Order of St. Anastasia). Awards of these honours are allowed to be worn in Russia, and enjoy semi-official recognition by the church and the state; for example, on 14 December 2001 the Ministry of Defence of the Russian Federation legalized the wearing of the Order of Saint Nicholas the Wonderworker in Russia by military persons on active duty.

=== Central Europe ===
In Central Europe, the head of the Habsburg family had the right to dispose of the Order of the Golden Fleece even after 1918. The very extensive treasure and the associated archive are in the Vienna Treasury. The Republic of Austria has expressly confirmed this. During the Nazi era, many Habsburg goods and orders were expropriated and dissolved. The USSR maintained this state of affairs during the Cold War to prevent any opposition among its oppressed peoples. After the collapse of communism, the order of St. George was reactivated by the Habsburg family as a Central European dynasty order. With both the Order of the Golden Fleece and the Order of St. George, deserved personalities are made knights today.

== Various dynastic orders ==
There are many dynastic orders of knighthood, primarily in Europe. Today, dynastic orders include those still being bestowed by a reigning monarch, those bestowed by the head of a royal house in exile, and those that became extinct. Although it is sometimes asserted that the heads of former reigning houses retain the right to their dynastic orders but cannot create new ones, that view is challenged by others who believe that the power to create orders remains with a dynasty forever. In a few cases, formerly reigning families are accused of "fudging" the issue by claiming to revive long extinct orders or by changing non-dynastic state orders into dynastic ones. One example of this is the Order of Saint Michael of the Wing, which is sometimes described as a revival of a long dormant order last awarded in the eighteenth century but also described as a new order created in 2004. Finally, there is the example of a Russian pretender Maria Vladimirovna who published a decree on 20 August 2010 to create the entirely new Imperial Order of the Holy Great Martyr Anastasia.

=== Bestowed by the Holy See ===
Although some former royal families and their supporters claim that Roman Catholic Church formally recognizes their right to award various orders, the Vatican denies all such assertions. On 16 October 2012, the Vatican Secretary of State renewed its formal announcement that it only recognizes the orders issued by the Pope, namely:

- Supreme Order of Christ
- Order of the Golden Spur
- Order of Pope Pius IX
- Order of Saint Gregory the Great
- Order of Pope Saint Sylvester

=== Under Papal protection ===
- Order of the Holy Sepulchre
- Sovereign Military Order of Malta
- Teutonic Order

=== Explicitly recognized by papal bull ===
- Order of Saints Maurice and Lazarus

The Secretary of State cautioned that "other orders, whether of recent origin or mediaeval foundation, are not recognised by the Holy See...To avoid any possible doubts, even owing to illicit issuing of documents or the inappropriate use of sacred places, and to prevent the continuation of abuses which may result in harm to people of good faith, the Holy See confirms that it attributes absolutely no value whatsoever to certificates of membership or insignia issued by these groups, and it considers inappropriate the use of churches or chapels for their so-called 'ceremonies of investiture.'"

=== Bestowed by current sovereign monarch ===
- The Most Noble Order of the Garter (United Kingdom)
- The Distinguished Order of the Golden Fleece (Spain)
- The Order of the Gold Lion of the House of Nassau (Netherlands and Luxembourg)
- The Royal Victorian Order (Commonwealth realms)
- The Order of the Elephant (Denmark)
- The Order of the Dannebrog (Denmark)
- The Order of Merit (Commonwealth realms)
- The Order of the House of Orange (Netherlands)
- The Most Ancient and Most Noble Order of the Thistle (United Kingdom)
- The Royal Order of the Seraphim (Sweden)
- The Royal Norwegian Order of Saint Olav (Norway)
- The Order of al-Hussein bin Ali (Jordan)

=== Bestowed by head of formerly reigning dynasty ===
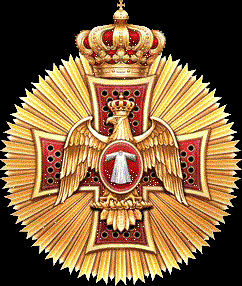
Grand Cross of the Order of the Eagle of Georgia

- The Military Order of the Collar of Saint Agatha of Paternò (Kingdom of Aragon)
- The Order of Saint George (Bavaria-Wittelsbach)
- The Order of St. Hubert (Bavaria-Wittelsbach)
- The Order of Theresa (Bavaria-Wittelsbach)
- The Order of Saint Alexander (Bulgaria)
- The Imperial Ethiopian Order of Saint Mary of Zion (Ethiopia)
- The Order of the Holy Spirit (France)
- The Order of Saint Michael (France)
- The Order of the Eagle of Georgia (Georgia, Bagrationi Dynasty)
- The Order of Queen Tamara (Georgia, Bagrationi Dynasty)
- The Order of the Crown of Georgia (Georgia, David Bagration of Mukhrani)
- The House Order of Hohenzollern (Hohenzollern, Germany)
- The Order of Saints George and Constantine, (former Greek royal family)
- The Order of Saints Olga and Sophia, (former Greek royal family)
- The Order of Skanderbeg (Albania, House of Zogu)
- The Imperial Austrian Order of Elizabeth (Habsburg-Lorraine)
- The Noble Order of the Golden Fleece (Habsburg-Lorraine)
- The Order of the Starry Cross (Habsburg-Lorraine)
- The Order of St. George (Habsburg-Lorraine)
- The Order of Vitéz (Habsburg-Lorraine)
- The Order of Saint Stephen of Hungary (Hungary)
- The Order of Prince Danilo I (Montenegro)
- The Order of Petrovic Njegos (Montenegro)
- The Order of Saint Peter of Cetinje (Montenegro)
- The Order of Saint George of Parma (Parma)
- The Order of the Immaculate Conception of Vila Viçosa (Portugal, House of Braganza)
- The Order of Saint Isabel (Portugal, House of Braganza)
- The Order of Merit of the Portuguese Royal House (Portugal, House of Braganza)
- The Order of Saint Michael of the Wing (Portugal, House of Braganza)
- The Order of Carol I (Romania, order founded in 1906 and discontinued with King Michael's abdication in 1947, and then revived by him on 5 January 2005 as a dynastic order)
- The Order of the Crown (Romania), founded as a state order it was revived by King Michael I as a Dynastic Order in 2011.
- The Order of Saint Andrew (Imperial House of Russia)
- The Order of Saint Catherine (Imperial House of Russia)
- The Order of Saint Alexander Nevsky (Imperial House of Russia)
- The Order of the White Eagle (Imperial House of Russia)
- The Order of Saint Anna (Imperial House of Russia)
- The Order of Saint Vladimir (Imperial House of Russia)
- The Order of Saint Nicholas the Wonderworker (Imperial House of Russia, a modern order created in exile on 1 August 1929 by the pretender Kirill Vladimirovich, a cousin of the last Tsar, Nicholas II of Russia)
- The Order of Saint Stanislav (Imperial House of Russia)
- The Order of Saint Anastasia (Imperial House of Russia), a modern order created in exile in 2010 by the Head of the Imperial House.
- The Order of Saint Michael the Archangel (Imperial House of Russia, a modern order created in exile in 1988 by the Head of the Imperial House Vladimir Kirillovich
- The Royal Order of the Intare (Rwanda)
- The Supreme Order of the Most Holy Annunciation (Savoy)
- The Order of Saints Maurice and Lazarus (Savoy)
- The Order of Merit of Savoy (Savoy)
- The Order of Parfaite Amitié (Thurn and Taxis)
- The Order of Saint Joseph (Tuscany)
- The Sacred Military Constantinian Order of Saint George (Two Sicilies)
- The Order of Saint Januarius (Two Sicilies)
- The Royal and Hashemite Order of the Pearl (Sulu, Royal House of Sulu)
- The Imperial Order of the Lion of Mandé (Mali, Imperial House of Mandé)
- The Order of the Rose (Brazil, House of Orleans-Braganza)
- The Imperial Order of the Cross (Brazil, House of Orleans-Braganza)
- The Imperial Order of St. Benedict of Avis (Brazil, House of Orleans-Braganza)
- The Order of Saint James of the Sword (Brazil) (Brazil, House of Orleans-Braganza)
- The Imperial Order of Christ (Brazil, House of Orleans-Braganza)
- The Order of Pedro I (Brazil, House of Orleans-Braganza)
- The Order of the Rasulids (Royal House of Tahir Buruj of the Rasulid dynasty)

=== Bestowed by head of non-sovereign traditional monarchies ===
- The Royal Order of Merit of Prince Uchicho (Bolivia, House of Pinedo)
- The Order of King Pōtatau Te Wherowhero (Aotearoa) - Established in 2014 by Māori King Tūheitia as an independent honours system separate from the New Zealand government and Commonwealth sovereignty.

== See also ==
- Chivalric order
- Military order (monastic society)
