= Grand Duke Vladimir of Russia =

Grand Duke Vladimir of Russia may refer to:

- The ruler of the Grand Duchy of Vladimir
- Grand Duke Vladimir Alexandrovich of Russia (1847–1909), son of Emperor Alexander II of Russia
- Vladimir Kirillovich, Grand Duke of Russia (1917–1992), his grandson
