= Order of Saint Nicholas the Wonderworker =

Award of the House of Romanov

Imperial Military Order of Saint Nicholas the Wonderworker Импepaтopcкий Boeнный Opдeн Cвятитeля Hикoлaя Чyдoтвopцa
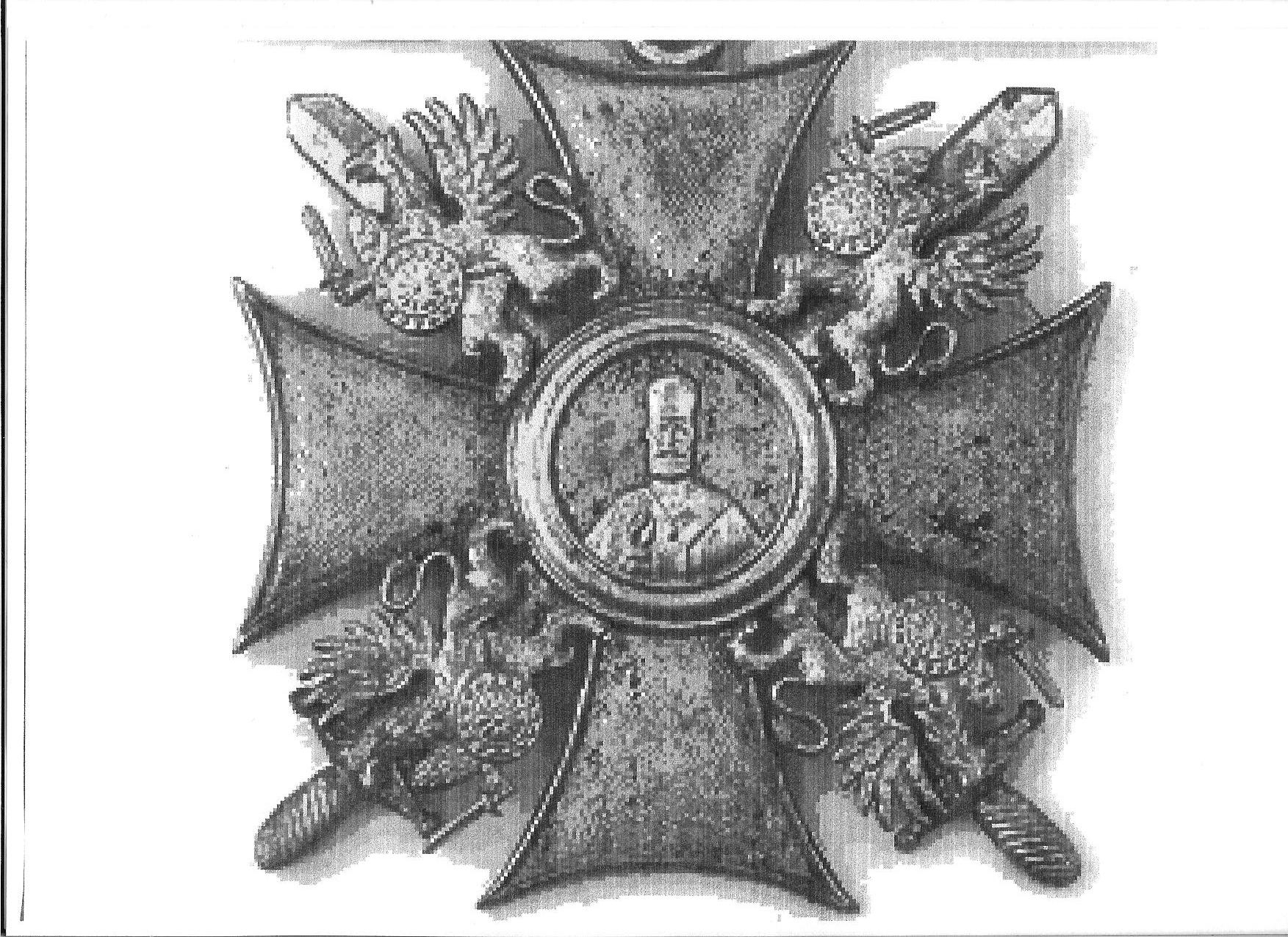
- Star of the Order

Awarded by Head of the House of Romanov
- Type: Dynastic Order
- Royal house: House of Romanov
- Religious affiliation: Russian Orthodox
- Motto: For Duty, Honour and Fatherland
- Status: Rarely constituted
- Sovereign: Grand Duchess Maria Vladimirovna of Russia
- Grades: Knight Grand Cordon; Knight Commander; Knight Officer; Knight

Precedence
- Next (higher): Imperial Order of St. Anna
- Next (lower): Imperial Order of St. Anastasia
- Grand Cordon, Officer and Knight Commander; The Ribbons of the Order

The Imperial Military Order of Saint Nicholas the Wonderworker (in Russian: Импepaтopcкий Boeнный Opдeн Cвятитeля Hикoлaя Чyдoтвopцa) was originally a medal, instituted in 1929 by the Russian pretender, Grand Duke Kirill Vladimirovich and conferred on Russian veterans who had fought in the First World War. A similar order was established by General Wrangel as Order of Saint Nicholas Thaumaturgus.

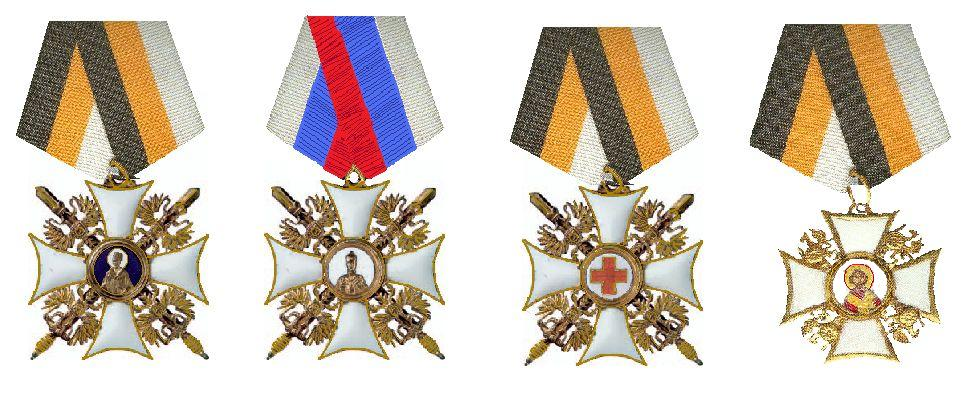
Four crosses of the Order from different epochs

== An outline of the history of the order ==
According to the eminent Soviet specialist I. G. Spasskiy, an order with this name was planned already in 1915, during the penultimate year of the reign of Nicholas II, but the project was never completed because of political developments. Fourteen years later the idea was adopted by Russians living in exile and the order was founded on 19 July 1929 by a cousin to the last Tsar, Grand Duke Kirill Vladimirovich, who had assumed the title of the Emperor of All the Russias in 1924. Originally, the order had only one class and all Russian veterans of World War I were entitled to receive it. There exist, however, enamelled and unenamelled badges, and one can assume that the enamelled ones were awarded to officers and the simpler ones to NCOs and privates.

On 4 August 2001 Grand Duke Kirill's granddaughter, the present pretender Maria Vladimirovna raised the old medal to the rank of a House Order of the Imperial House of Russia, adding a Grand Cross to be worn on a sash and a Commanders neck cross. The old medal became the lowest class of the order, worn on a chest riband.

On 14 December 2001, the Ministry of Defence of the Russian Federation legalized the wearing of the order in Russia by military persons on active duty.

== The Insignia ==
The badge of the order is a cross pattée, covered on the obverse with white enamel. In the centre there is a medallion, showing three different variations: on crosses awarded to Christians a figure of Saint Nicholas, while non-Christians received a badge with the monogram of the founder "K I", and the medical personnel still another one with the emblem of the Red Cross in the centre. In early versions of the badge there are griffins from the coat of arms of the Romanovs and swords between the arms of the cross, in later versions Imperial Russian eagles in gold. The reverse of the cross was unenamelled and bore the inscription "BEЛ. MIPOB. BOЙHA 1914 Г.-1917 Г." (Great World War 1914–1917).

The order was worn on a riband in the colours of the Imperial Flag of Russia, black-yellow-white. In spite of being called "Grand Cross" the 1st Class of the present order has no breast star.

The modern order instituted in 2001 has the initials of Nicholas II (H II) and Cyril (K I) on the reverse, surrounded by the motto "ДOЛГ-ЧECТЬ-OТEЧECТBO" (Duty-Honour-Fatherland). The depiction of Saint Nicholas on the obverse is surrounded by the inscription "ЭA BOEННЫE ЭACЛУГИ" (For military merit).

== Literature ==
- И. Г. Cпaccкий, Инocтpaнныe и pyccҝиe opдeнa дo 1917 гoдa, Leningrad 1958
- Vaclav Mericka, Book of Orders and Decorations, Prague 1978
