= Grand Duke Vladimir Alexandrovich of Russia =

Russian grand duke (1847–1909)

Grand Duke Vladimir Alexandrovich
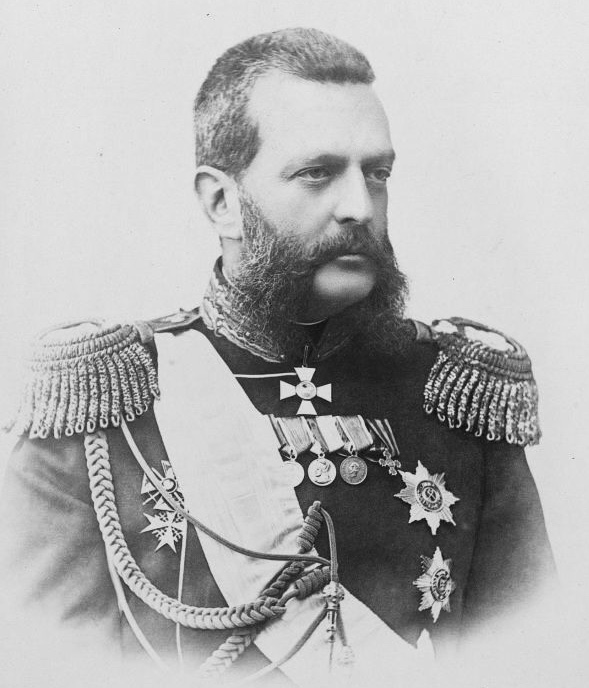
- Vladimir in c. 1894
- Born: 22 April 1847; Winter Palace, Saint Petersburg, Russian Empire
- Died: 17 February 1909 (aged 61); Vladimir Palace, Saint Petersburg, Russian Empire
- Burial: Grand Ducal Mausoleum, Fortress of St. Peter and Paul, St. Petersburg, Russian Empire
- Spouse: Duchess Marie of Mecklenburg-Schwerin (m. 1874)
- Issue Detail: Grand Duke Kirill Vladimirovich of Russia; Grand Duke Boris Vladimirovich of Russia; Grand Duke Andrei Vladimirovich of Russia; Elena Vladimirovna, Princess Nicholas of Greece and Denmark
- House: Holstein-Gottorp-Romanov
- Father: Alexander II of Russia
- Mother: Marie of Hesse and by Rhine
- Religion: Russian Orthodoxy

Grand Duke Vladimir Alexandrovich of Russia (Russian: Владимир Александрович Романов, romanized: Vladimir Aleksandrovich Romanov; 22 April 1847 – 17 February 1909) was a son of Emperor Alexander II of Russia, a brother of Emperor Alexander III of Russia and the senior Grand Duke of the House of Romanov during the reign of his nephew, Emperor Nicholas II.

Grand Duke Vladimir followed a military career and occupied important military positions during the reigns of the last three Russian Emperors. Interested in artistic and intellectual pursuits; he was appointed President of the Academy of Fine Arts. He functioned as a patron of many artists and as a sponsor of the Imperial ballet.

During the reign of his father, Emperor Alexander II, he was made Adjutant-General, senator in 1868 and a member of the Council of State in 1872. His brother, Alexander III, also promoted his career. He became a member of the Council of Ministers, Commander of the Imperial Guards Corps and Military Governor of Saint Petersburg. He tried to exert some influence over his nephew Tsar Nicholas II, but had to content himself with holding a rival court with his wife Grand Duchess Maria Pavlovna at his palace in Saint Petersburg. The events of Bloody Sunday in 1905, while he was Military Governor of St Petersburg, tarnished his reputation. During the last years of his life, the rift between his family and that of Nicholas II widened. He died after a stroke in 1909.

== Early life ==
Grand Duke Vladimir Alexandrovich was born on 22 April 1847 at the Winter Palace in Saint Petersburg. He was fourth among the eight children of Alexander II of Russia and his wife Maria Alexandrovna, born Princess Marie of Hesse and by Rhine.

He was eight years old when at the death of his grandfather Nicholas I, his father became Russian tsar. Grand Duke Vladimir was well educated and through his life he was interested in literature and the arts. However, as all male members of the Romanov family he had to follow a military career. As only the third son in a numerous family, he was far from the succession to the Russian throne. Nevertheless, in 1865, the early death of his eldest brother, the Tsarevich Nicholas, left Vladimir unexpectedly close to the throne as heir presumptive after his second brother Alexander. Unlike Alexander, the new heir, Vladimir was witty and ambitious. Rumors circulated at the time, that Alexander II would have his eldest surviving son removed from the succession placing Vladimir as his heir. Alexander himself would have preferred to step aside from the succession hoping to marry morganatically, but eventually he yielded to family pressure and married a suitable bride. Relations between the two brothers, although cordial, were never warm.

== A Russian Grand Duke ==
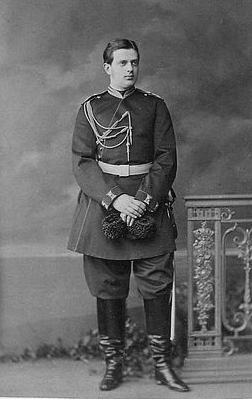
Grand Duke Vladimir Alexandrovich was a notorious playboy in his youth photo by Sergei Lvovich Levitsky

In 1867 Grand Duke Vladimir was named honorary president of the Russian ethnographic society, the same year he accompanied his father and his brother Alexander to the World Fair in Paris, where his father was shot by a Polish nationalist. In 1871 he visited the Caucasus region, Georgia, Chechnya and Dagestan with his father and his brothers. In 1872 he accompanied his father to Vienna at the reunion of the three emperors: Russia, Germany and Austria.

A member of the European beau monde, he made frequent trips to Paris. He became portly as a young man, although in later life he slimmed down. He was a skillful painter and gathered an important book collection. He was a well known gourmet, accumulating a collection of menus copied after meals, adding notations with his impressions about the food.

== Marriage ==
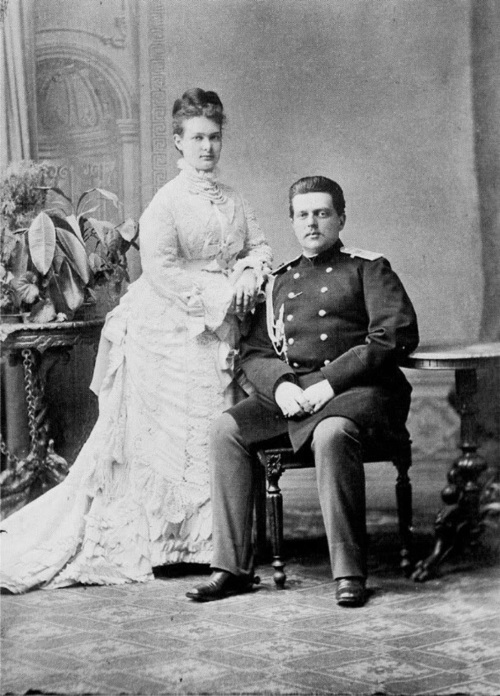
Grand Duke Vladimir and Duchess Marie of Mecklenburg Schwerin. Engagement photograph, spring 1874.

While traveling through Germany with his family in June 1871, Grand Duke Vladimir met Duchess Marie of Mecklenburg-Schwerin (14 May 1854 – 6 September 1920), daughter of Grand Duke Frederick Francis II and of Augusta of Reuss-Köstritz. She was seventeen years old and was already engaged to a distant relative, Prince George of Schwarzburg. Grand Duke Vladimir was then twenty four. The two were smitten with each other. Vladimir was a second-cousin of Maria's father, who was also a grandson of Grand Duchess Elena Pavlovna of Russia. They were also second-cousins in descent from Frederick William III of Prussia (1770-1840). In order to marry Vladimir, Maria broke off her previous engagement, but she refused to undergo the expected conversion to the Orthodox religion. This delayed the couple's engagement for almost two years. Finally, Emperor Alexander II consented to Marie's continued adherence to her Lutheran faith, allowing Vladimir to marry her without loss of his rights to the Russian throne. The engagement was announced in April 1874.

The wedding took place on 28 August 1874 at the Winter Palace in Saint Petersburg. Vladimir's wife adopted the patronymic Pavlovna upon her marriage and became known as Grand Duchess Maria Pavlovna of Russia - or as Miechen within the Romanov family. Decades later on 10 April 1908, shortly before the death in 1909 of Vladimir Aleksandrovich, she converted to the Russian Orthodox confession; on 13 April 1908 Emperor Nicholas II commanded the use of the style "the Orthodox Grand Duchess". - «именовать Ея Императорское Высочество Благоверною Великою Княгинею»

The Grand Duke Vladimir and his wife were described as witty and ambitious. They enjoyed entertaining and their residence in Saint Petersburg became popular among the Imperial capital's socialites.

== Vladimir's palace ==
By the time of his marriage, construction had already been completed on Vladimir's own residence and he moved there with his wife. Named the Vladimir Palace, it was one of the last imperial palaces constructed in Saint Petersburg. Grand Duke Vladimir appointed architect Aleksandr Rezanov to head the project because of his knowledge of ancient Russian architecture. A team of architects assisted Rezanov: Vasily Kenel, Andrei Huhn, Ieronim Kitner and Vladimir Shreter. The foundation stone was laid on 15 July 1867. Construction work lasted five years, from 1867 to 1872. The furniture was designed by architect Victor Schröter.

The site chosen for the palace was the Embankment near the Winter Palace in the center of St Petersburg. It had previously been occupied by the house of Count Vorontsov-Dashkov which had been bought by the treasury. The lot was enlarged by purchasing the neighboring house of Madame Karatinga. The total construction and furnishing cost of Vladimir Palace was 820,000 rubles, a much more modest amount than the one spent building previous palaces for other grand dukes a decade earlier.

The Vladimir palace stands, like the Winter Palace and the Marble Palace, by the Neva on the Dvorstsovaya Embankment. The façade, richly ornamented with stucco rustication, was patterned after Leon Battista Alberti's palazzi in Florence. The main porch is built of Bremen sandstone and adorned with griffins, coats-of-arms, and cast-iron lanterns. Other details are cast in Portland cement.

The palace and its outbuildings contain some 360 rooms, all decorated in eclectic historic styles: Neo-Renaissance (reception room, parlor), Gothic Revival (dining room), Russian Revival (Oak Hall), Rococo (White Hall), Byzantine style (study), Louis XIV, various oriental styles, and so on. This interior ornamentation, further augmented by Maximilian Messmacher in 1881–1891, is considered by art historians, such as Nikolay Punin, a major monument to the 19th-century passion for historicism. Grand Duke Vladimir decorated his apartments with his collection of Russian paintings by the best artists of his time, such as Ilya Repin, Ivan Aivazovsky, Feodor Bruni, Vasili Vereshchagin, Ivan Kramskoy, Mikhail Vrubel, Nikolai Sverchkov and Rudolf Ferdinandovich Frentz.

== Issue ==
Grand Duke Vladimir Alexandrovich and his wife Grand Duchess Maria Pavlovna had five children:

- Grand Duke Alexander Vladimirovich of Russia (31 August 1875 – 16 March 1877). He died in infancy.
- Grand Duke Kirill Vladimirovich of Russia (12 October (N.S.), 1876 – 12 October 1938). He married his first cousin Princess Victoria Melita of Saxe-Coburg and Gotha. They had three children.
- Grand Duke Boris Vladimirovich of Russia (24 November 1877 – 9 November 1943). He married his mistress Zinaida Rashevskaya. He did not leave legitimate descendants.
- Grand Duke Andrei Vladimirovich of Russia (14 May (N.S.) 1879 – 30 October 1956). He married his mistress Matilda Kchessinska. They had one son.
- Grand Duchess Elena Vladimirovna of Russia (29 January 1882 – 13 March 1957). She married Prince Nicholas of Greece and Denmark, third son of George I of Greece and Grand Duchess Olga Constantinovna of Russia. They had three daughters.

== During three reigns ==
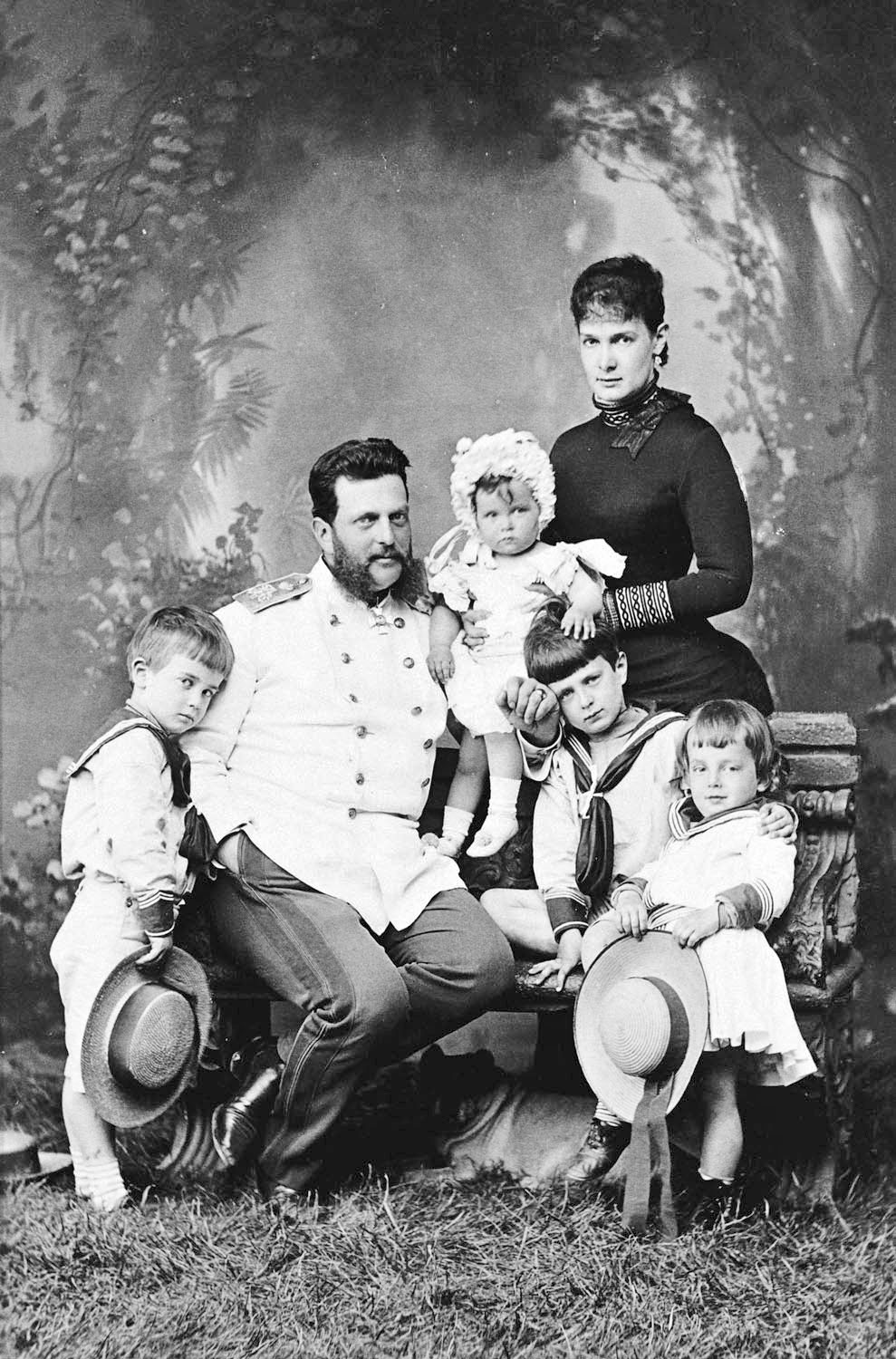
Grand Duke Vladimir with his wife and children in 1884. The children, from left to right: Boris, Elena, Kirill and Andrei.

Grand Duke Vladimir occupied important military positions during three reigns. He experienced battle in the Russo-Turkish War of 1877–1878, taking part in the campaign alongside his father and his brothers Alexander and Sergei. He fought against the Turkish troops as the commanding officer of the XII Corps of the Russian army. However, his military career interested him less than art and literature. In 1880 his father appointed him President of the Imperial Academy of Fine Arts. He also became a member of the Academy of Science and an agent of the Rumyantsev Museum. Grand Duke Vladimir was in the Imperial capital when his father was assassinated and succeeded by Alexander III in 1881. It fell upon Vladimir, who regained his composure more quickly than his brother, to announce their father's death to the public. Vladimir inherited his father's personal library, which the Grand Duke added to his large book-collection that was arranged in three libraries at the Vladimir Palace. (After the Russian Revolution of 1917 these books were sold off randomly by weight and currently form part of several American university-collections.)

Although Alexander III was not close to Vladimir and there was a rivalry between their wives, he promoted his brother's career. The day after their father's death he appointed Vladimir as Military Governor of St Petersburg, a post previously held by their uncle Grand Duke Nicholas Nikolaevich. Vladimir served on the State Council and chaired the official commission that supervised the building of the Church of the Savior on Blood, built between 1883 and 1907 on the site of the assassination of his father, Emperor Alexander II of Russia.

Grand Duke Vladimir was a keen philanthropist. A talented painter himself, he became a famous patron of the arts. He frequented many artists and gathered a valuable collection of paintings and old icons. He later took a great interest in ballet. He financed the tour of Sergei Diaghilev's Ballets Russes.

Emperor Alexander III's three sons rendered Vladimir and Vladimir's own three sons remote in the line of succession to Russia's throne. Nevertheless, Vladimir seemed unexpectedly close to becoming Emperor in 1888 when Alexander III with his wife and all of their children were involved in the Borki train disaster. Vladimir and his wife, then in Paris, did not bother to come back to Russia. This annoyed Alexander III, who commented that if he had died with his children, Vladimir would have rushed to return to Russia to become Emperor. At Alexander III's death in 1894 there were unfounded rumors that the army intended to proclaim Grand Duke Vladimir emperor in place of his nephew Nicholas II. Vladimir tried to influence the new Emperor, particularly at the beginning of Nicholas II's reign.

Although the Grand Duke was conservative in his political views, he did believe in human virtues. Something of a rascal himself, he preferred the company of amusing witty people - regardless of their ideology or background. The more liberal members of Russian society were invited to lavish parties at his residence. He often intimidated people with his coarseness, rudeness and hot temper. Vladimir was also a devoted family man, close to his children.

== Last years ==
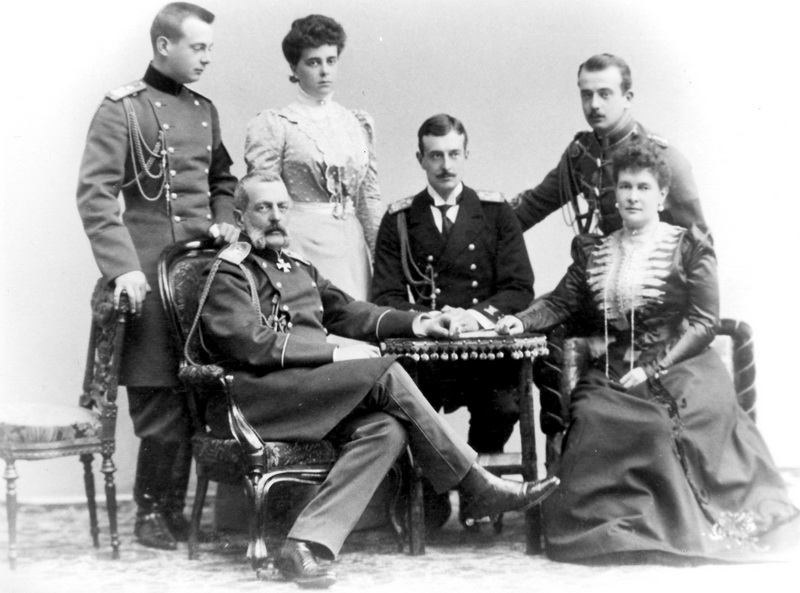
The Vladimirs, on the occasion of their silver wedding in 1899. From the left: Grand Duke Andrei, Grand Duke Vladimir, Grand Duchess Elena, Grand Duke Kirill, Grand Duchess Maria Pavlovna, and Grand Duke Boris.

In January 1905 a wave of strikes broke out in St. Petersburg. On 9 January (O.S.)/22 (N.S.) a peaceful procession of workers led by a priest, Father Georgy Gapon, marched towards the Winter Palace from different points in the city hoping to present requests for reforms directly to Emperor Nicholas II. The Tsar, however, was not in the capital. General Ivan Fullon, St Petersburg Governor, tried to stop the march. When a large group of workers reached Winter Palace Square, troops acting on direct orders from Guards Commander Prince Sergei Vasilchikov opened fire upon the demonstrators. More than 100 marchers were killed and several hundred were wounded. Although Grand Duke Vladimir claimed no direct responsibility about that tragedy, since he was also away from the city, his reputation was tarnished. The massacre, known as Bloody Sunday, was followed by a series of strikes in other cities, peasant uprisings in the country, and mutinies in the armed forces, which seriously threatened the tsarist regime and became known as the Revolution of 1905. A month after Bloody Sunday, Vladimir's brother Grand Duke Sergei Alexandrovich was killed by a terrorist bomb in Moscow.

In October 1905, Vladimir's eldest son and heir Grand Duke Kirill Vladimirovich of Russia married his first cousin Victoria Melita of Saxe-Coburg and Gotha, daughter of Vladimir's sister Maria. Nicholas II was enraged by the marriage, which was contracted without his permission and was in violation of the Russian Orthodox ban on marriages between first cousins. Nicholas stripped Kirill of his imperial titles and banished him. Vladimir protested the treatment given to his son and resigned from all his posts in protest. Vladimir “shouted so violently at his nephew that the court chamberlain, waiting outside the door, feared for his master’s safety and almost ran off to summon the imperial guards.” Vladimir slammed his fists on Nicholas' desk and ripped off the military decorations from his uniform, shouting, "I have served your father, your grandfather and you. But now as you have degraded my son I no longer wish to serve you.” Eventually, Nicholas II relented and forgave his cousins for marrying without his consent, but he did not allow them to return to Russia. The full pardon came only after several deaths in the family, including Vladimir's own, had placed Kirill third in the line of succession to the Imperial Throne.

Grand Duke Vladimir died suddenly on 4(O.S.)/17(N.S.) February 1909 after suffering a major cerebral hemorrhage. Vladimir's widow and their four children survived the Russian Revolution of 1917. In 1924 in exile, Kirill proclaimed himself Emperor de jure, Vladimir's line thereby claimed headship of the Imperial House. Vladimir was the paternal grandfather and namesake of the future pretender claimant Grand Duke Vladimir Kirillovich of Russia. His granddaughter Princess Marina of Greece and Denmark became a British princess by marriage to Prince George, Duke of Kent, fourth son of King George V and Queen Mary, in 1934. Grand Duke Vladimir Alexandrovich's great granddaughter, Grand Duchess Maria Vladimirovna, is the current claimant and his great grandson Prince Michael of Kent is an honorary member of the Romanov Family Association.

== Honours and awards ==
The Grand Duke received the following Russian and foreign decorations:

Russian

- Knight of St. Andrew, 22 April 1847
- Knight of St. Alexander Nevsky, 22 April 1847
- Knight of St. Anna, 1st Class, 22 April 1847
- Knight of the White Eagle, 22 April 1847
- Knight of St. Stanislaus, 1st Class, 11 June 1865
- Knight of St. George, 3rd Class, 14 November 1877
- Knight of St. Vladimir, 4th Class, 22 April 1868; 2nd Class with Swords, 15 September 1877; 1st Class, 15 May 1883

Foreign

- Grand Duchy of Hesse: Grand Cross of the Ludwig Order, 8 June 1857
- Kingdom of Prussia:
  - Knight of the Black Eagle, 22 April 1857; with Collar, 1872
  - Grand Commander's Cross of the Royal House Order of Hohenzollern, 25 September 1872
  - Pour le Mérite (military), 27 December 1877
- Principality of Serbia: Grand Cross of the Cross of Takovo, 27 July 1857
- Oldenburg: Grand Cross of the Order of Duke Peter Friedrich Ludwig, with Golden Crown, 28 July 1860
- Württemberg: Grand Cross of the Württemberg Crown, 1864
- Denmark: Knight of the Elephant, 14 June 1866
- French Empire: Grand Cross of the Legion of Honour, 6 June 1867
- Saxe-Weimar-Eisenach: Grand Cross of the White Falcon, 17 June 1867
- Kingdom of Greece: Grand Cross of the Redeemer, 28 June 1867
- Principality of Montenegro: Grand Cross of the Order of Prince Danilo I, 22 November 1868
- Kingdom of Italy: Knight of the Annunciation, April 1869
- Sweden-Norway: Knight of the Seraphim, 27 July 1869
- Belgium: Grand Cordon of the Order of Leopold, 13 June 1870
- Netherlands: Grand Cross of the Netherlands Lion, 1 July 1870
- (Austrian Empire) (Kingdom of Hungary) Austria-Hungary: Grand Cross of the Royal Hungarian Order of St. Stephen, 19 August 1872
- Baden:
  - Knight of the House Order of Fidelity, 29 August 1872
  - Grand Cross of the Zähringer Lion, with Collar, 29 August 1872
- Mecklenburg: Grand Cross of the Wendish Crown, with Crown in Ore, 22 April 1874
- United Principalities of Romania: Iron Cross for the Crossing of the Danube (1877), 1878
- (Saxe-Coburg and Gotha) (Duchy of Saxe-Altenburg) (Saxe-Meiningen) Ernestine duchies: Grand Cross of the Saxe-Ernestine House Order, 1880
- Spain: Knight of the Golden Fleece, 29 October 1891
- Kingdom of Bavaria: Knight of St. Hubert, 1897
- Empire of Japan: Grand Cordon of the Order of the Chrysanthemum, 13 April 1902
- United Kingdom: Honorary Grand Cross of the Royal Victorian Order, 29 December 1903
