= Order of Saint Michael the Archangel =

Knighthood order of the Romanovs created in 1988

Imperial Order of Saint Michael the Archangel

Awarded by Head of the House of Romanov
- Type: Dynastic Order
- Royal house: House of Romanov
- Religious affiliation: Russian Orthodox
- Awarded for: (1) Individuals who have distinguished themselves in the struggle for the liberation of Russia from godless communism, as well as fighters against communism in other countries; (2) Individuals of distinguished services in Charity and Philanthropy
- Status: Currently constituted
- Sovereign: Grand Duchess Maria Vladimirovna of Russia
- Grades: Knight Grand Cross; Knight/Dame Commander; Knight/Dame

Precedence
- Next (higher): Imperial Order of St. Stanislaus
- Next (lower): Imperial Order of St. Princess Olga
- Ribbon of the order

The Imperial Order of Saint Michael the Archangel (Russian: Императорский Орден Святого Михаила Архангела), is a dynastic order of knighthood instituted in 1988 by Grand Duke Vladimir Kirillovich, claimant to the headship of the former Russian Imperial House.

It is a house honour and is currently conferred by Grand Duchess Maria Vladimirovna, current claimant of the headship of the former imperial house. It celebrates its foundation on the Feast of Saint Michael the Archangel and the Synaxis of the All-Bodiless Powers on the 21/8 November (NS/OS).

== History of the Order ==
The order was founded in 1988 by Grand Duke Vladimir Kirillovich of Russia, Head of the Imperial House of Russia. It was created in commemoration of the 1,000 years of Russian Orthodoxy, the 375th anniversary of the ascension to the throne of the House of Romanov, and the 50th anniversary of his own accession as head of the dynasty. At the time of its establishment, the Order was conferred in only one class for Knights and Dames, and was awarded to "individuals who have distinguished themselves in the struggle for the liberation of Russia from godless communism, as well as fighters against communism in other countries."

In 2012, in commemoration of the 400th anniversary of the end of the Time of Troubles, the Order was reorganized by Vladimir Kirillovich's daughter Grand Duchess Maria Vladimirovna of Russia, "for the purpose of strengthening and further developing the Russian Imperial tradition of philanthropy." The Order is now awarded to "individuals of both sexes for distinguished services in charity and philanthropy."

== Award Classes of the Order ==
The Order of Saint Michael the Archangel has three classes, as follows:

- The first class: Knights and Dames Grand Cross of Saint Michael the Archangel
- The second class: Knights and Dames Commander of Saint Michael the Archangel
- The third class: Knights and Dames of Saint Michael the Archangel

== The Insignia of the Order ==
The Device of the Imperial Order of Saint Michael the Archangel is a four-pointed cross, black-enamelled gold, with flanged arms, centering a round enamel medallion. On the face is an image of Saint Michael the Archangel in gold, surrounded by a blue outer ring. On the back, appears the monogram of Tsar Mikhail Fedorovich with the date “1613” in gold, and the monogram of Grand Duke Vladimir Kirillovich, with the date “1988.” The cross is suspended from a Russian Imperial Crown.

The Star of the Imperial Order of Saint Michael the Archangel is eight-pointed. In the center appears a Cross of the Order in miniature, surrounded by the Order’s Motto: “Mercy and Truth.”

Knights of the Order wear its Devices in the following way:

- Knights Grand Cross of Saint Michael the Archangel (First Class) - wear a sash across their right shoulder with the suspended Grand Cross, and the Star of the Order at left.
- Knight Commander of Saint Michael the Archangel (Second Class) - wear the Cross of the Order worn at the neck suspended from a ribbon.
- Knight of Saint Michael the Archangel (Third Class) - wear the Cross of the Order suspended from a ribbon worn on the left.

Dames of the Order wear its Devices in the following way:

- Dames of the Grand Cross of Saint Michael the Archangel (First Class) - wear the sash across their right shoulder with the suspended Grand Cross, and the Star of the Order at left.
- Dames Commander of Saint Michael the Archangel (Second Class) – wear the Cross of the Order on the left shoulder suspended from a double bow.
- Dames of Saint Michael the Archangel (Third Class) – wear the Cross of the Order suspended from a single bow on the left shoulder.

== The International Association of the Order of Saint Michael the Archangel ==
Created in 2012, the Association is a private philanthropic endeavor of Maria Vladimirovna, Grand Duchess of Russia. Membership is exclusively reserved to men and women who are recommended for membership by two Knights or Dames of the Order of Saint Michael, and approved by the Head of the Imperial House. Association members are awarded the right to wear a miniature badge of the order in bronze suspended from a ribbon on the left breast. Officers of the Association are conferred the right to wear a gold palm upon the ribbon. The Association's purpose is to raise funds to support charitable, philanthropic, spiritual and cultural projects under the patronage of the Russian Imperial House. Not less than 80 percent of the funds collected annually by the Association is to be directed to these endeavors.
