= Order of Saint Stanislaus (House of Romanov) =

Russian military and civilian decoration

Imperial Order of Saint Stanislaus Орденъ Св. Станислава Order św. Stanisława
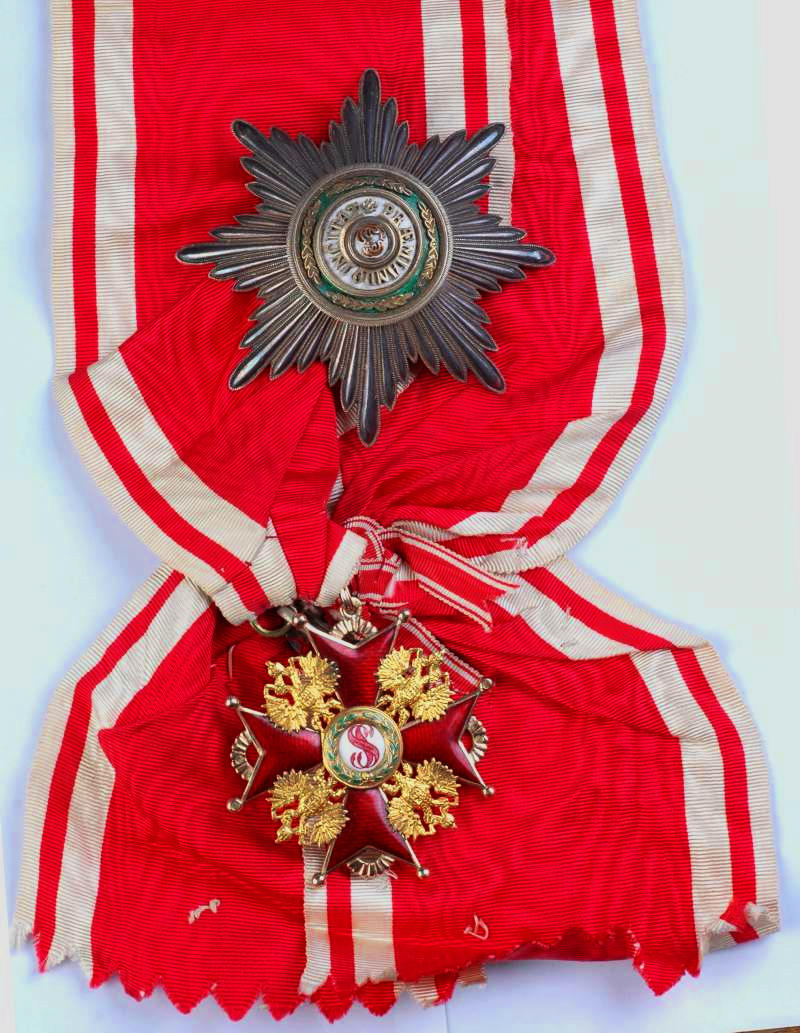

Awarded by Head of the House of Romanov
- Type: Dynastic order of knighthood
- Royal house: House of Romanov
- Religious affiliation: Russian Orthodox
- Ribbon: Bright red with a white stripe on either side and a thinner white stripe on the end of either stripe
- Motto: Praemiando incitat ("Rewarding encourages")
- Awarded for: Military and civil merits
- Status: active
- Grades: Knight Grand Cross; Knight Commander; Knight

Precedence
- Next (higher): Order of Saint Anastasia
- Next (lower): Order of Saint Michael the Archangel
- Ribbon of the order

The Imperial Order of Saint Stanislaus (Polish: Order św. Stanisława; Russian: Орденъ Св. Станислава, romanized: Orden Sv. Stanislava), also spelled Stanislas or Stanislav, is a Russian dynastic order of knighthood founded as Order of the Knights of Saint Stanislaus, Bishop and Martyr in 1765 by King Stanisław II Augustus of the Polish–Lithuanian Commonwealth. In 1831 after the downfall of the November Uprising, the order was incorporated into the Chapter of Russian Orders as part of the honours system of the Russian Empire by Emperor Nicholas I of Russia.

In 1839, the Russian Order of Saint Stanislaus received new statutes, including granting status of nobility on its recipients in all three classes.

As a result of the Russian Revolution 1917, activities were suspended by the Soviet Union, although it has since been awarded by the head of the Imperial House of Romanov as a dynastic order. When in 1918 Poland regained its independence as the Second Polish Republic, a Polish order was introduced as a successor to the Polish Order of Saint Stanislaus, the Order of Polonia Restituta.

However, the Order of Saint Stanislas continued to be awarded after the revolution by Grand Duke Kirill Vladimirovich, Grand Duke Vladimir Kirillovich, and Grand Duchess Maria Vladimirovna; the latter a claimant to the headship of the Imperial House.

== History ==
=== Polish–Lithuanian Commonwealth ===
Stanislaus II Augustus Poniatowski, King of Poland established the Order of the Knights of Saint Stanislaus, Bishop and Martyr on May 7, 1765 to honour the service to the King. After the partition of Poland it was renewed in the Duchy of Warsaw in 1807. Since 1815 in the Polish (Congress) Kingdom, the order, originally in a single class, was retained and divided into four classes.

When in 1918 Poland regained its independence as the Second Polish Republic, a Polish order was introduced as an alleged successor to the Polish Order of Saint Stanislaus, the Order of Polonia Restituta.

=== Russian Empire ===
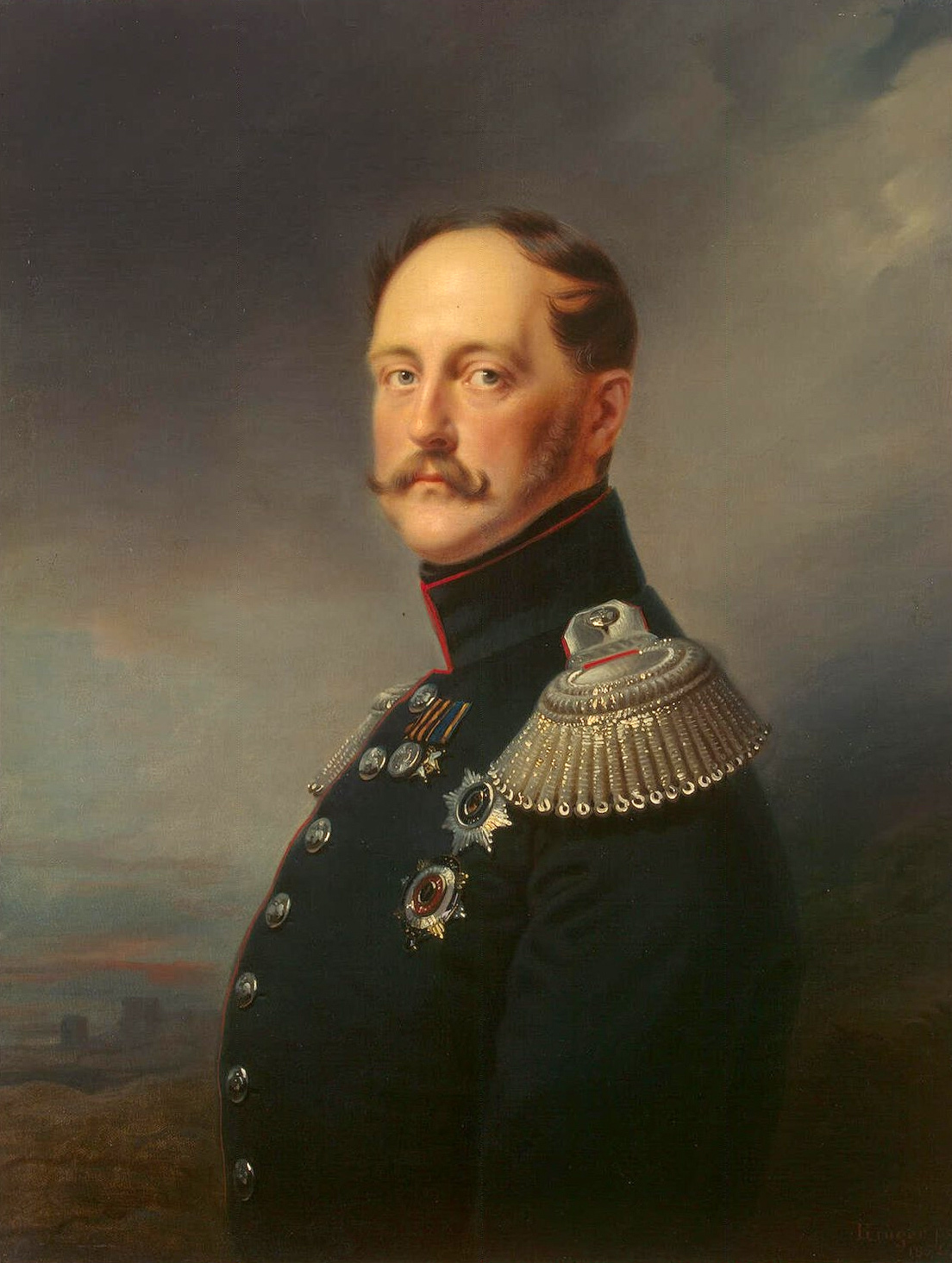
Emperor Nicholas I of Russia made Order of Saint Stanislaus a Russian order and introduced new statutes 1839.

In 1831 after the downfall of the November Uprising, the order was added to the honours system of the Russian Empire in 1832, where it remained until 1917, included in the Chapter of Russian Orders.

In 1832 the image of Saint Stanislaus was removed, replacing it with the cypher "SS". The single-headed eagle on the Polish order's cross was replaced with the double-headed eagle of the Russian Empire. All administration and management of the imperial and royal order were transferred from Warsaw to St. Petersburg.

In 1839 Nicholas I issued a new statute for the order, according to which it was divided into three degrees, and was awarded to "any subject of the Russian Empire and the Kingdom of Poland" for military and civilian distinction, or for private services such as charity and philanthropy. The Second Class insignia of the Order was divided into two types: a cross decorated with the imperial crown, and the cross without the crown (this distinction was abolished in 1874).

In 1844, it was decreed that when the order was granted to non-Christians, the cypher of St. Stanislaus was replaced by a black double-headed Imperial Russian eagle.

The Order of Saint Stanislaus 3rd degree became the junior most award in the order of precedence of Russian orders and was the most common reward. It was awarded to almost all military and government employees as well as civilians who served the empire with a blameless record, and who has status in the Russian table of ranks. At the time of the establishment of the Order, the award of every class provided the right of hereditary noble status, but there was discontent among the nobility that too many new nobles were being created from the ranks of merchants and civil employees, and so in 1845 the highest command suspended the awarding of the 2nd and 3rd class. Awarding resumed on 28 June 1855, but from this date the right of hereditary nobility was awarded only with the 1st class of the Order of Saint Stanislaus, the other two being awarded with personal nobility only.

In 1855 the symbol of crossed swords was added to Military awards of the order.

In 1874 the Chapter of Orders canceled the awarding of the symbol of the imperial crown, but any such orders previously awarded retained the right to wear them with the crown.

=== Provisional Government ===
After the February Revolution, the order was not canceled. The Provisional Government of Russia arguably usurped the Order of Saint Stanislaus, changing its appearance: the imperial eagles were changed to crown-less eagles. However, after 1917, the order was not awarded in Soviet Russia in any form.

=== Legitimist conferral in exile ===
Both Grand Duke Kirill Vladimirovich, Grand Duke of Russia and his successor Grand Duke Vladimir Kirillovich of Russia awarded the Order of Saint Andrew, which automatically awards the recipient membership First class in all the lower Orders, including the Order of Saint Stanislaus. Furthermore, Grand Duke Vladimir Kirillovich of Russia awarded the order independently at least once, in 1973. As a result, the Order of Saint Stanislaus is considered to have been awarded continually by the legitimist pretender to the Russian throne since 1917.

Present fount of honour is Grand Duchess Maria Vladimirovna of Russia. Initially active in exile after the revolution, in recent years it has enjoyed degrees of recognition by some prominent Russian institutions, as well as full recognition by the International Commission on Orders of Chivalry and others.

== Organisation ==
The heads of the Russian Imperial House in exile have continued to award Imperial and Royal Order of Saint Stanislaus. H.I.H. Grand Duchess Maria Vladimirovna, head of the Russian Imperial House, continues to award the Russian Imperial Order of Saint Stanislaus as a dynastic order of knighthood. These actions were disputed by her relative Dmitry Romanov.

Knights of the Order of Saint Stanislaus are granted nobility in every class if they do not already possess this status: hereditary nobility in the First class, personal nobility in the Second and Third classes.

Knights of the Order of Saint Stanislaus were once also awarded a pension: the 30 senior knights of the First class received 143 rubles, the 60 senior gentlemen of the Second class received 115 rubles, and the 90 senior gentlemen of the Third class received 86 rubles.

=== Insignia ===
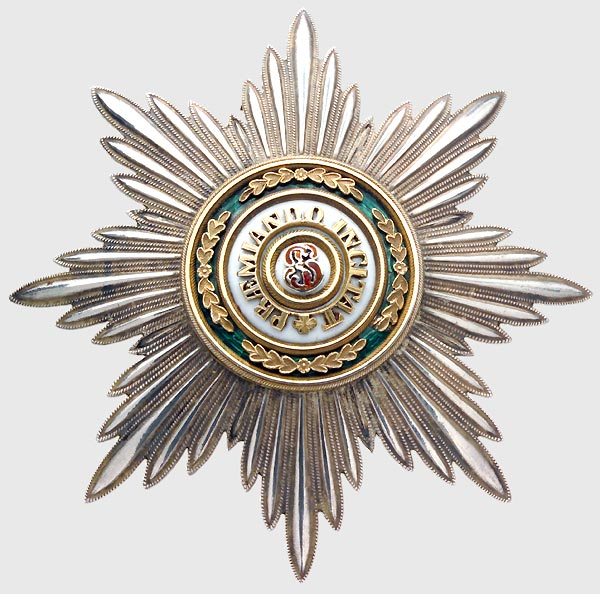
Grand cross star

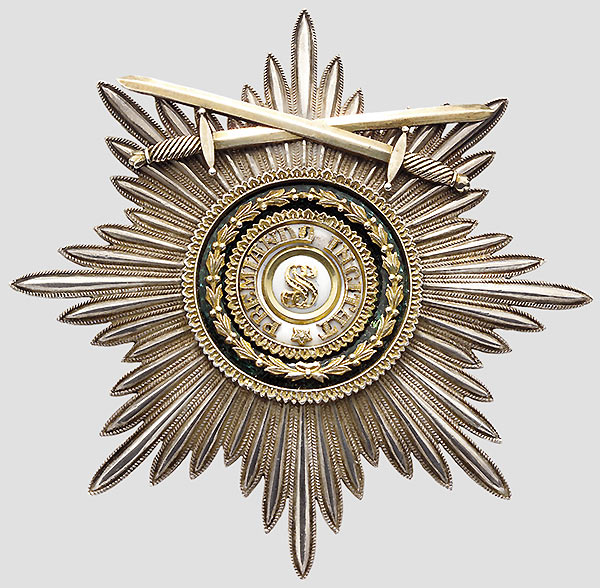
Grand cross star with swords

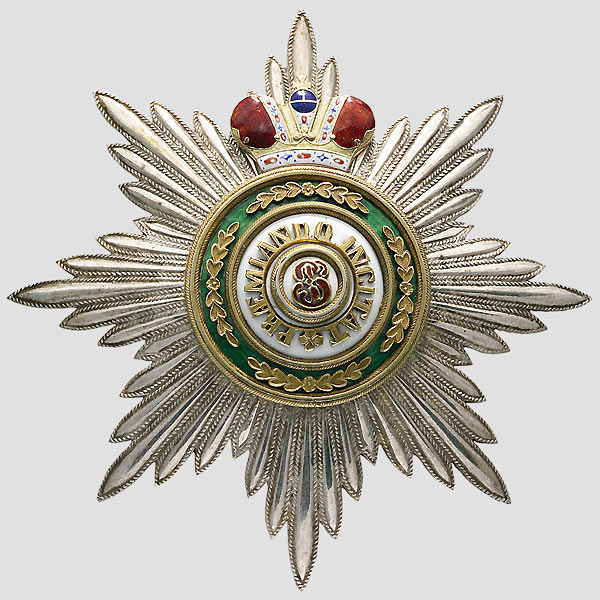
Grand cross with crown

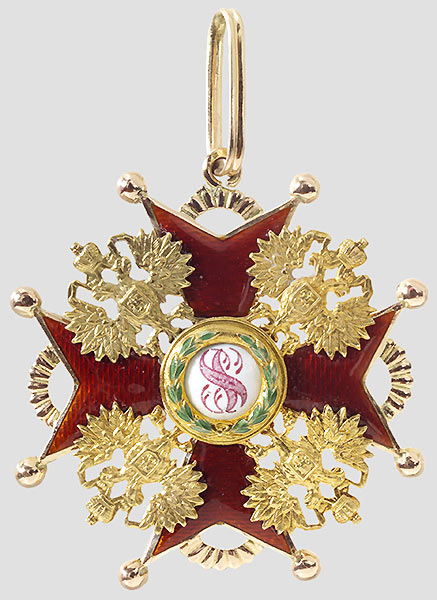
Badge

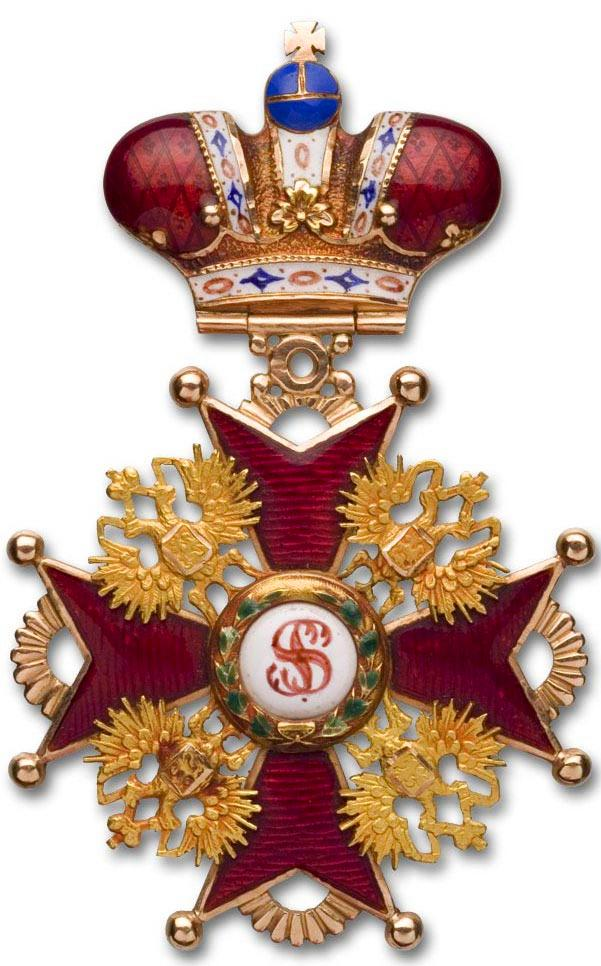
Badge with crown

On the star and crosses of all classes, non-Christian recipients will have, instead of the cypher of Saint Stanislaus, a black and gold Imperial Russian double-headed Eagle.

According to the Imperial Chapter of Orders and other honors, ed. 1892 [2], the Order of Saint Stanislaus has three degrees, for which the insignia are:

==== 1st class ====
Gold cross, covered with a red enamel face, the four ends of which are further divided in two sharp points; on the edges of the cross a double gold rim; at the eight sharp points golden balls; and among these terminals, bringing them together, are gold semicircles of striped shells; in the center, on a white filigree round shield encircled by a gold border with a green wreath on it, the Latin monogram of Saint Stanislaus, a red "SS"; at each of the axillae, the state symbol of the Russian double-headed eagle in gold. On the rear side of the cross, all gold, with the verso a centered white round enameled shield, which depicts the same monogram "SS".

It is worn on a moiré red ribbon, the breadth of two and a half inches, double white stripes at the borders, worn over the right shoulder with the star on the left side of the chest.

Silver star, the eight rays centering a white round shield circled with wide green stripes with two gold rims, the external rim wider; on the green enameled band between, gold laurel branches connected in the middle of each by two flowers; center roundel, in white enamel with red letters the cypher of Saint Stanislaus: "SS"; and around the hoop in a white box with gold letters, the motto of the order: Praemiando incitat ("rewarding encourages") divided at the top with a golden flower.

==== 2nd class ====
Cross of the same form, as for the first class, but of lesser magnitude, worn around the neck, on a ribbon with a width of one or two inches.

==== 3rd class ====
Cross of the same form as the first two classes but worn in the buttonhole on the same ribbon with a width of five-eighths inches.

== Legacy ==
=== Self-styled orders ===
A number of self-styled orders, or pseudo-orders, exist, claiming to be continuations of the original imperial order. While several of these may be praise-worthy philanthropic organisations, one even boasting "royal patronage" by morganatic descendants of the Russian Imperial House, none of them are recognised as legitimate orders of chivalry.

== See also ==
- Order of Saint Stanislaus
