= Grand Duchess Maria Vladimirovna of Russia =

Disputed head of the House of Romanov

Grand Duchess Maria Vladimirovna
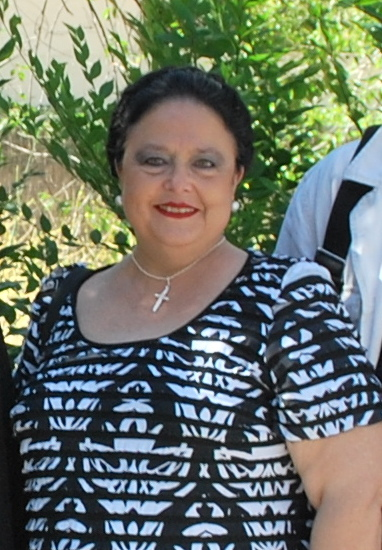
- The Grand Duchess in 2010

Head of the House of Romanov (Disputed)
- Tenure: 21 April 1992 – present
- Predecessor: Vladimir
- Heir apparent: George
- Born: 23 December 1953 (age 72); Madrid, Spain
- Spouse: Prince Franz Wilhelm of Prussia (m. 1976; div. 1985)
- Issue: Grand Duke George of Russia
Names
- Maria Vladimirovna Romanova
- House: Holstein-Gottorp-Romanov
- Father: Grand Duke Vladimir Kirillovich of Russia
- Mother: Princess Leonida Bagrationi of Mukhrani
- Religion: Russian Orthodox

Grand Duchess Maria Vladimirovna of Russia (Russian: Мария Владимировна Романова, romanized: Mariya Vladimirovna Romanova; born 23 December 1953) is a Russian aristrocrat who has been a claimant to the headship of the House of Romanov, the Imperial Family of Russia (who reigned as Emperors and Autocrats of all the Russias from 1613 to 1917) since 1992. She is a great-great-granddaughter in the male line of Emperor Alexander II of Russia. Although she has used Grand Duchess of Russia as her title of pretence with the style Imperial Highness throughout her life, her right to do so is disputed. Since her father's death on 21 April 1992, some of her monarchist supporters have referred to her as Maria I, titular "Empress of Russia", a title she does not claim herself.

== Early life ==
=== Birth ===
Maria Vladimirovna was born in Madrid, the only child of Grand Duke Vladimir Kirillovich of Russia, head of the Imperial Family of Russia and titular Emperor of Russia, and Princess Leonida Bagration-Mukhrani of Georgian, Polish, German and Swedish descent. Her paternal grandparents were Grand Duke Kirill Vladimirovich of Russia and Grand Duchess Victoria Fyodorovna (née Princess Victoria Melita of Edinburgh and Saxe-Coburg-Gotha) through whom she is a great-great-granddaughter of Queen Victoria. Her godfather was Grand Duke Andrei Vladimirovich of Russia, for whom Prince Nicholas of Romania stood in at the christening ceremony, and her godmother was Queen Ioanna of Bulgaria.

=== Education ===
Maria was educated at Runnymede College in Madrid and Paris before studying Russian history and literature at the University of Oxford.

Maria Vladimirovna lives in Madrid. She is fluent in Russian, English, French, and Spanish, and also speaks some German, Italian, and Arabic.

On 23 December 1969, upon reaching her dynastic majority, Maria swore an oath of loyalty to her father, to Russia, and to uphold the Fundamental Laws of Russia which governed succession to the defunct throne. At the same time, her father issued a controversial decree recognising her as heiress presumptive and declaring that, in the event he predeceased other dynastic Romanov males, then Maria would become the "Curatrix of the Imperial Throne" until the death of the last male dynast. This has been viewed as an attempt by her father to ensure the succession remained in his branch of the imperial family, while the heads of the other branches of the imperial family, the Princes Vsevolod Ioannovich of the Konstantinovichi, Roman Petrovich of the Nikolaevichi and Prince Andrei Alexandrovich of the Mihailovichi declared that her father's actions were illegal. As it happened, Vladimir Kirillovich, who died in 1992, outlived all the other male Romanov dynasts, and his daughter had no occasion to assume curatorship.

== Marriage ==
In Dinard on 4 September 1976 (civil) and at the Russian Orthodox Chapel in Madrid on 22 September 1976 (religious), Maria married Prince Franz Wilhelm of Prussia, her third cousin once removed. He is a Hohenzollern great-grandson of Germany's last emperor Wilhelm II and a great-great-great-grandchild of Queen Victoria of the United Kingdom. Maria's aunt Grand Duchess Kira Kirillovna of Russia, her father's late sister, had been married to Louis Ferdinand, Prince of Prussia, since 1938, head of the House of Hohenzollern since 1951.

Franz Wilhelm converted to the Eastern Orthodox faith prior to the wedding, taking the name Michael Pavlovich and receiving the title of a Grand Duke of Russia from Maria's father. The couple separated in 1982, a year after the birth of their only child, George Mikhailovich, who had been granted the title Grand Duke of Russia at birth by his grandfather Vladimir. Following the divorce on 19 June 1985, Franz Wilhelm reverted to his Prussian name and style.

== Succession claims ==
Styles of Grand Duchess Maria Vladimirovna
- Reference style: Her Imperial Highness
- Spoken style: Your Imperial Highness

Monogram of Grand Duchess Maria Vladimirovna

Maria Vladimirovna is a patrilineal descendant of Alexander II of Russia. The original House of Romanov had died out with Empress Elizabeth of Russia in 1762 and was continued by Peter III of Russia, who was born a Duke of Holstein-Gottorp, a branch of the House of Oldenburg, from which the current reigning monarchs of Norway and Great Britain, as well as the former of Greece, also descend in the male line. The oldest known ancestor of this extensive family is Elimar I, Count of Oldenburg, first mentioned in 1091.

When Vladimir Kirillovich died on 21 April 1992, his daughter Maria claimed to succeed him as head of the Russian Imperial Family on the grounds that she was the only child of the last male dynast of the Imperial house according to the Romanovs' Pauline Laws. Although the charter of the Romanov Family Association (RFA), which represents other descendants of the Romanov family, asserts the premise that Russia's form of government should be determined democratically and that therefore the Association and its members undertake to adopt no position on any claims to the Imperial throne, its two most recent presidents have personally opposed Maria's claims: Nicholas Romanov, Prince of Russia, who maintained his own claims to dynastic status and to headship of the Romanov family, stated, "Strictly applying the Pauline Laws as amended in 1911 to all marriages of Equal Rank, the situation is very clear. At the present time, not one of the Emperors or Grand Dukes of Russia has left living descendants with unchallengeable rights to the Throne of Russia," and his younger brother, Prince Dimitri Romanov, said of Maria's assumption of titles, including "de jure Empress of all the Russias", "It seems that there are no limits to this charade". The supporters of Maria Vladimirovna point to the fact that neither Nicholas nor his brother Dimitri had any dynastic claims due to the morganatic marriage of their parents. Maria's parents' marriage of equal rank is, of course, questioned by her cousins, who claim that her mother's family, the Bagrationi dynasty, became Russian subjects after they lost their thrones in the Georgian kingdoms of Kartli-Kakheti and Imereti around 1800 and was therefore not a ruling dynasty.

By the Romanov House law, the Pauline Laws, she is however the rightful heir to the throne if the Bagrationi are seen as royal equals. The Pauline Laws emphasize male succession before female succession. As an example, if Tsarevich Alexei Romanov had not been murdered in 1918, and died without issue (i.e., without children), his sisters, Olga, Tatiana, Maria, and Anastasia wouldn't become Empresses before male Romanov relatives. Alexander III had four sons: Nicholas II of Russia whose only son died before he could produce heirs, Grand Duke Alexander Alexandrovich of Russia, who died shortly before he was 11 months old, Grand Duke George Alexandrovich of Russia, who died with no issue, and Grand Duke Michael Alexandrovich of Russia whose only son, George Mikhailovich, Count Brasov died at age 20, childless.

From there, the line of succession looks to Alexander III's father, Alexander II. His sons, Nicholas Alexandrovich, Tsesarevich of Russia, and Grand Duke Sergei Alexandrovich of Russia both died without issue. Excluding the future Alexander III, the third boy Grand Duke Vladimir Alexandrovich of Russia – born after the childless Tsarevich and Alexander III, whose descendants couldn't claim leadership for many reasons – had four sons. The eldest died in infancy and the second eldest, Grand Duke Kirill Vladimirovich of Russia, had one son, Grand Duke Vladimir Kirillovich of Russia. His only child is Grand Duchess Maria Vladimirovna of Russia, making her the legal heir to the Russian throne.

Following the discovery of the remains of Emperor Nicholas II and most of his immediate family in 1991, Maria Vladimirovna wrote to President Boris Yeltsin regarding the burial of the remains, saying of her Romanov cousins, whom she does not recognise as members of the Imperial House (including the grandchildren of Nicholas II's sister Grand Duchess Xenia), that they "do not have the slightest right to speak their mind and wishes on this question. They can only go and pray at the grave, as can any other Russian, who so wishes". At the behest of the Russian Orthodox Church, Maria did not recognise the authenticity of the remains and declined to attend the reburial ceremony in 1998, however according to Victor Aksyuchits, ex-advisor of Boris Nemtsov, the exact reason behind Maria's absence from the state burial for Nicholas II and his family in 1998 was motivated by the Russian government's refusal to recognize her status as official Head of the Romanov House, after asking via a letter prior the funeral ceremony. She has also said, regarding some of her Romanov cousins, that "My feeling about them is that now that something important is happening in Russia, they suddenly have awakened and said, 'Ah ha! There might be something to gain out of this.'"

When questioned about the ongoing rift among Romanov descendants, Maria said:

"Attempts to disparage my rights have originated with people who, firstly, do not belong to the Imperial Family, and, secondly, either do not themselves know the relevant laws or think that others do not know these laws. In either case, there is unscrupulousness at work. The only thing that causes me regret is that some of our relatives waste their time and energy on little intrigues instead of striving to be of some use to their country. I have never quarreled with anyone about these matters and I remain open to a discussion and cooperation with all, including, of course, my relatives. But there can be no foundation for cooperation without respect for our dynastic laws, fulfilling these laws, and following our family traditions."

== Role in Russia and activities ==
Maria hopes for the restoration of the monarchy someday and is "ready to respond to a call from the people".

In a 2018 interview, she defined her own understanding of her role as follows:

The Imperial House of Russia considers it its main goal to help preserve the historical and cultural continuity of our house and country, and to do all we can to strengthen the ethnic, religious, and civil peace and harmony of Russia. As a matter of principle, we do not engage in any form of politics whatsoever. We believe that the idea of a legitimate, hereditary monarchy, which preserves an unbroken, living connection with the centuries-long history of Russia and which conceives of society as a unified family, still has resonance today and remains a viable choice for our country and peoples. But we are hardly unaware that, at the present time and for the foreseeable future, the conditions are not right in Russia for a restoration of the monarchy. For now, the spheres of our activities are limited to promoting philanthropy; participating in social peace-making processes; reviving and maintaining traditions and preserving our country’s historical, cultural, and natural heritage; strengthening the spiritual and moral foundations of our nation; helping to foster patriotism; and advancing a positive image of Russia in the wider world.

In 2002, Maria became frustrated with the internal strife within the Russian monarchist movement. When representatives of the Union of Descendants of Noble Families, one of two rival nobility associations (the other, older one being the Assembly of the Russian Nobility) were discovered to be distributing chivalric titles and awards of the Order of Saint Nicholas the Wonderworker, without her approval, she published a relatively strongly worded disclaimer.

In 2003, Kirill I Patriarch of Moscow and all Russia stated in a congratulatory message on Maria Vladimirovna's 55th birthday, "you are the embodiment of a Russian Grand Duchess: noble, wise, compassionate, and consumed with a genuine love for Russia. Though you may reside far from Russia, you continue to take an active part in its life, rejoicing when there are triumphs and empathizing when there are trials. It is deeply gratifying to know that, even in these new historical circumstances, you are making a significant contribution to the building of Russia's global standing on the basis of spiritual and moral values, and the centuries-old traditions of the Russian people. The Russian Orthodox Church remains the preserver of the historical memory of the Russian people, and supports, as it has traditionally, the warmest possible relations with the Russian Imperial House."

She did not claim restitution of confiscated assets, but she made several requests to rehabilitate the Romanovs through the courts, which were repeatedly rejected until the Tsar's family was finally rehabilitated by the Supreme Court's decision on 1 October 2008. In May 2010, Maria and other members of the Romanov dynasty met with members of the Ottomans at Topkapı Palace, which was the first official meeting between these two former ruling (and rival) families.

In March 2013, the Patriarch of the Russian Orthodox Church, made a statement which seems to have drawn further supporters. In an interview, he was asked if any of the Romanovs had a legitimate claim to the throne and responded: "Well, to the second part of your question: are the claims, as you say, of the descendants of the Romanovs to the Russian throne legitimate? I would like to say right away that there are no claims. Today, none of the descendants of the Romanovs make claims the Russian throne. But in the person of the Grand Duchess Maria Vladimirovna and her son George, the succession of the Romanovs is preserved – not to the Russian imperial throne, but simply historically." (Сегодня никто из лиц, принадлежащих к потомкам Романовых, не претендует на Российский престол. Но в лице Великой княгини Марии Владимировны и ее сына Георгия сохраняется преемственность Романовых – уже не на Российском императорском престоле, а просто в истории). Further, the Patriarch noted: "And I must thank this family and many other Romanovs with gratitude for their today's contribution to the life of our Fatherland. Maria Vladimirovna supports a lot of good initiatives, she visits Russia, she meets people, she elevates the most ordinary people who have distinguished themselves to a nobility. I remember well how on the Smolensk land an old peasant woman was elevated to the dignity of nobility, who did so much for those who were by her side during the difficult years of the war and in the post-war period. Therefore, the cultural contribution of this family continues to be very noticeable in the life of our society. "

On 14 May 2013, at a ceremony at the Romanov Museum in Kitay-gorod, Maria awarded the Order of Saint Anna (1st Degree) to San Francisco Archbishop Kyril of the Russian Orthodox Church Outside of Russia, the first award of this historic Romanov dynastic order since the October Revolution of 1917. In December 2013, Grand Duchess Maria Vladimirovna visited the United States at the request of the Russian Orthodox Church Abroad, which received her with full honours and recognition as head of the Russian Imperial House. On 20 July 2014, at a ceremony in the Church in the Izmailovo district of Moscow, Maria awarded Russian Vice-Admiral Oleg Belaventsev the Order of Saint Anna (1st Degree), Prosecutor General of the Autonomous Republic of Crimea, Natalia Poklonskaya, the Imperial Ladies' Order of Saint Anastasia (founded by herself in 2010), and the former cosmonaut Alexei Leonov the Order of Saint Stanislaus (1st degree), dynastic house orders of the Romanovs.

On 17 July 2018 she participated in the liturgical commemoration of the centenary of the assassinations of Saints Nicholas II, Empress Alexandra Feodorovna and their children conducted in Yekaterinburg by Patriarch Kirill I. On 28 July 2014, at the invitation of the mayor of Irkutsk, Viktor Kondrashov, Maria attended a commemorative event there for the 100th anniversary of Russia's entry into the First World War and, among other things, visited Irkutsk State University, where she presented a medal "In Commemoration of the 400th Anniversary of the House of Romanov". She visited Malta in June 2017, with former Russian Prime Minister Sergei Stepashin organizing the trip; Accompanied by the Russian ambassador, she met the Maltese President Marie Louise Coleiro Preca. She knows Russian President Vladimir Putin from numerous encounters. He respects the House of Romanov, but has no interest in restoring the monarchy. Other politicians, however, have spoken out in favor of this, including Vladimir Zhirinovsky, Sergey Aksyonov, Natalia Poklonskaya and Aleksandr Dugin. Nikolai Patrushev is at least considered a sympathizer, the oligarch Konstantin Malofeev is considered a supporter of the monarchist movement; he founded and finances the Double-Headed Eagle Society and was a best man at the wedding of Maria's son.

In January 2021, Grand Duchess Maria announced the morganatic engagement of her son Grand Duke George Mikhailovich of Russia to Rebecca Virginia Bettarini from Italy. Bettarini converted to Russian Orthodoxy and took the name Victoria Romanovna. Grand Duchess Maria granted permission for the couple to marry. She decreed that Bettarini will have the title Princess, with the predicate "Her Serene Highness" and the right to use the surname Romanov. The Imperial Wedding took place on 1 October 2021 at Saint Isaac's Cathedral in Saint Petersburg. The Russian Ministry of Foreign Affairs assisted with obtaining travel visas for guests and the Russian Ministry of Culture assisted in obtaining locations for the wedding ceremony and festivities. A delegation of the Russian Guards formed a line. The reception was catered by Yevgeny Prigozhin.

Maria has in particular come to terms with the new Russian elite around President Vladimir Putin and not only awards the historical dynastic orders of the House of Romanov, but also partly newly created orders such as the Order of Saint Michael the Archangel (founded by her father in 1988) or the Ladies' Order of Saint Anastasia (founded by herself in 2010), to personalities close to the House of Romanov and the Russian Orthodox Church, including Siloviks and Russian oligarchs. She even goes so far as to elevate such people to the nobility, i. e. persons who usually have no biographical or cultural connection to the traditional Russian nobility, but are often historically connected to the CPSU or the KGB and mostly very influential today. However, the lowest tier of the Russian nobility into which these people are usually admitted, traditionally does not bear noble titles, but only coats of arms. In the Tsarist Empire the award of certain orders entailed admission into the personal (often even hereditary) nobility: the Grand Cross of all orders and the Order of Saint Vladimir and the Order of St. George of all classes (as well as previously also the promotion to higher military ranks). In 2007, Maria is said to have ennobled the former head of the Russian domestic secret service Federal Security Service (FSB), Nikolai Patrushev, who is considered one of Putin's closest confidants (and one of his possible successor candidates). Patrushev himself described the FSB employees in an interview as "our new nobility" because of their sense of dedicated service. While newly founded aristocratic associations in Russia recognize such "ennoblings" and include these families into registers of the nobility, accepting them as members, the traditional associations of the descendants of the White émigrés (such as the Russian CILANE member association Union de la Noblesse Russe based in Paris) reject the admission of such "new nobles" on the grounds that Grand Duchess Maria Vladimirovna is neither the undisputed pretender to the throne nor does she – who is not a reigning monarch – herself have any constitutional authority to ennoble.

After previously voicing her support for Crimea and Donbas annexation in 2014 by Russia she said in an interview on her website in April 2018: "Before the Russian people today and our descendants stretches a long and gradual path toward the restoration of the power and might of Russia." She issued a statement with regard to the Russian invasion of Ukraine, regretting the civil war between brotherly nations and stressing that the imperial family does not feel entitled to express a political position. This attitude has not gone without criticism. She herself admitted in an interview that her stance inevitably affects the relationship between herself and other European royal families, but that they would never forget the fact that they are related and continue the dialogue. But, as she emphasized, "no normal person could possibly think that the House of Romanov would be on the side of those who seek to weaken Russia. Foreigners therefore treat us as rivals who are worthy of respect... Every imperial and royal family naturally promotes and defends the position of their country“.

In 2023, on the occasion of the seventieth birthday of the Grand Duchess, Patriarch Kirill made an unequivocal recognition of her position as Head of the House of Romanov in a congratulatory letter published on the Patriarchal website addressing her as "Grand Duchess Maria Vladimirovna, Head of the Russian Imperial House" (Великой княгине Марии Владимировне, главе Российского Императорского Дома), and praising her efforts in the fields of charity, philanthropy, and culture. The Grand Duchess's son Grand Duke George Romanov and his Italian wife Princess Victoria, along with other members of the dynasty, gathered in the Cathedral of Christ the Savior in Moscow to celebrate the baptism of Princess Kira Leonida Romanov on 13 July. The baptism was held 40 days after the birth of the baby, in accordance with Russian Orthodox tradition. The princess, who was named after a saint martyred by Roman emperor Diocletian, has several godparents, including Prince Emanuele Filiberto of Savoy, Prince Boris of Bulgaria, Prince David VII of Georgia, Archduke Maximilian of Austria, Russian Ambassador to the Seychelles Artem Kozhin and his wife Elena, as well as Oksana Hoffman Girey, who is an official at the Kazakh consulate in Monaco. The birth was announced by the Grand Duchess herself, who released this announcement:

"BY THE GRACE OF GOD We, GRAND DUCHESS MARIA VLADIMIROVNA, Head of the Russian Imperial House, Hereby proclaim to all:

On 2 June 2025, Our daughter-in-law, Her Serene Highness Princess Victoria Romanovna, the wife of Our son and heir, His Imperial Highness the Sovereign Heir, the Tsesarevich and Grand Duke George Mikhailovich, was safely delivered of a child – a granddaughter to Us, who has been given the name Kira, in honor of the Venerable Saint Kira of Beroea

Receiving this addition to Our House as a new sign of God’s grace, bestowed upon Us for consolation, We ask all Our compatriots to offer heartfelt prayers to the Almighty for the healthy growth and prosperity of the newborn.

In accordance with the currently valid House Laws and the Family Act of 14/27 September 2020, it is fitting that Our granddaughter be styled and titled:

Her Serene Highness Princess Kira Georgievna.

Given at Madrid, on the 2nd day of June in the year of Our Lord 2025, being the 34th year since We assumed the rights and duties of Our August Ancestors – the Emperors of All Russia.

In the original, signed in Her own hand:

MARIA."

== Honours ==
=== Russian Dynastic honours ===
- House of Romanov: Sovereign Knight of the Order of St. Andrew
- House of Romanov: Sovereign and Grand Mistress Dame Grand Cordon of the Order of St. Catherine
- House of Romanov: Sovereign Knight of the Order of St. Alexander Nevsky
- House of Romanov: Sovereign Knight of the Order of the White Eagle
- House of Romanov: Sovereign of the Order of St. George
- House of Romanov: Sovereign Knight Grand Cordon of the Order of St. Vladimir
- House of Romanov: Sovereign Knight Grand Cordon of the Order of St. Anna
- House of Romanov: Sovereign Knight Grand Cordon of the Order of Saint Stanislaus
- House of Romanov: Sovereign Knight Grand Cordon of the Order of Saint Michael the Archangel
- House of Romanov: Founder Sovereign Grand Mistress Dame of the Order of Saint Anastasia

=== Russian Orthodox Church ===
- Russian Orthodox Church: Order of St. Sergius of Radonezh, 1st Class
- (Russian Empire) Russian Orthodox Church Outside Russia: Order of Our Lady of the Sign, 1st Class
- (Russian Empire) Russian Orthodox Church Outside Russia: Medal of John of Shanghai and San Francisco

=== Moldovan Orthodox Church ===
- (Moldova) Moldovan Orthodox Church: Medal of Saint Paraskevi

=== Ukrainian Orthodox Church ===
- (Ukraine) Ukrainian Orthodox Church (Moscow Patriarchate): Medal of Saint Barbara

=== Foreign dynastic ===
- (Ethiopia) Ethiopian Imperial Family: Knight Grand Cordon of the Order of the Queen of Sheba
- (Georgia (country)) Georgian Royal Family: Knight Grand Cross with Collar of the Order of Queen Tamara
- Sovereign Military Order of Malta: Bailiff Grand Cross of Sovereign Military Order of Malta
- (Kingdom of Portugal) Portuguese Royal Family: Knight Grand Cross of the Royal Order of Saint Michael of the Wing

=== States ===
- Transnistria: Commander of the Order of the Republic

=== Awards ===
- Italy: Honorary Citizen of the City of Agrigento
- Russia: Winner of the Russian International Person of the Year
- Russia: Honorary Citizen of the Ivolginsky District
- Russia: Honorary member of the Russian Academy of Arts
- Russia: Medal of the Assembly of the Russian Nobility

== Ancestry ==
Ancestors of Grand Duchess Maria Vladimirovna of Russia

8. Grand Duke Vladimir Alexandrovich of Russia
4. Kirill Vladimirovich, Grand Duke of Russia
9. Duchess Marie of Mecklenburg-Schwerin
2. Vladimir Kirillovich, Grand Duke of Russia
10. Alfred, Duke of Saxe-Coburg and Gotha
5. Princess Victoria Melita of Edinburgh
11. Grand Duchess Maria Alexandrovna of Russia
1. Grand Duchess Maria Vladimirovna of Russia
12. Prince Alexander Bagration of Mukhrani
6. George, Prince Bagration of Mukhrani
13. Maria Dmitrievna Golovatcheva
3. Princess Leonida Bagration of Mukhrani
14. Sigismund Nowina Złotnicki
7. Helena Nowina Złotnicka
15. Princess Maria Elisabarowna Eristavi of Ksani

== See also ==
- List of grand duchesses of Russia

== Bibliography ==
- Léonida, Grande-duchesse de Russie (2000). Chaque matin est une grace (in French). Éditions Jean-Claude Lattès. ISBN 2709621622.
- Massie, Robert K. (1995). The Romanovs : The Final Chapter. New York City: Random House. ISBN 0-224-04192-4. OCLC 185630578.
- Prassoloff, Boris (2024). Tsars sans empire : Les prétendants Romanov en exil 1919–1992 (in French). Paris: Éditions Perrin. ISBN 978-2262103415.

Grand Duchess Maria Vladimirovna of Russia House of Romanov Born: 23 December 1953
Russian royalty
Preceded by Vladimir Kirillovich	Head of the Imperial House of Romanov; 21 April 1992 – present	Incumbent; Heir apparent: George Mikhailovich
Titles in pretence
Preceded by Vladimir Kirillovich	— TITULAR — Empress and Autocrat of All Russia; 21 April 1992 – present Reason for succession failure: Russian Revolution leads to Abolition of monarchy and Dissolution of Russian Empire	Incumbent; Heir apparent: George Mikhailovich
