= Order of Saint Anastasia =

Russian Imperial Order of Knighthood

Imperial Order of Saint Anastasia the Holy Great Martyr 'Alleviatrix of Captives'
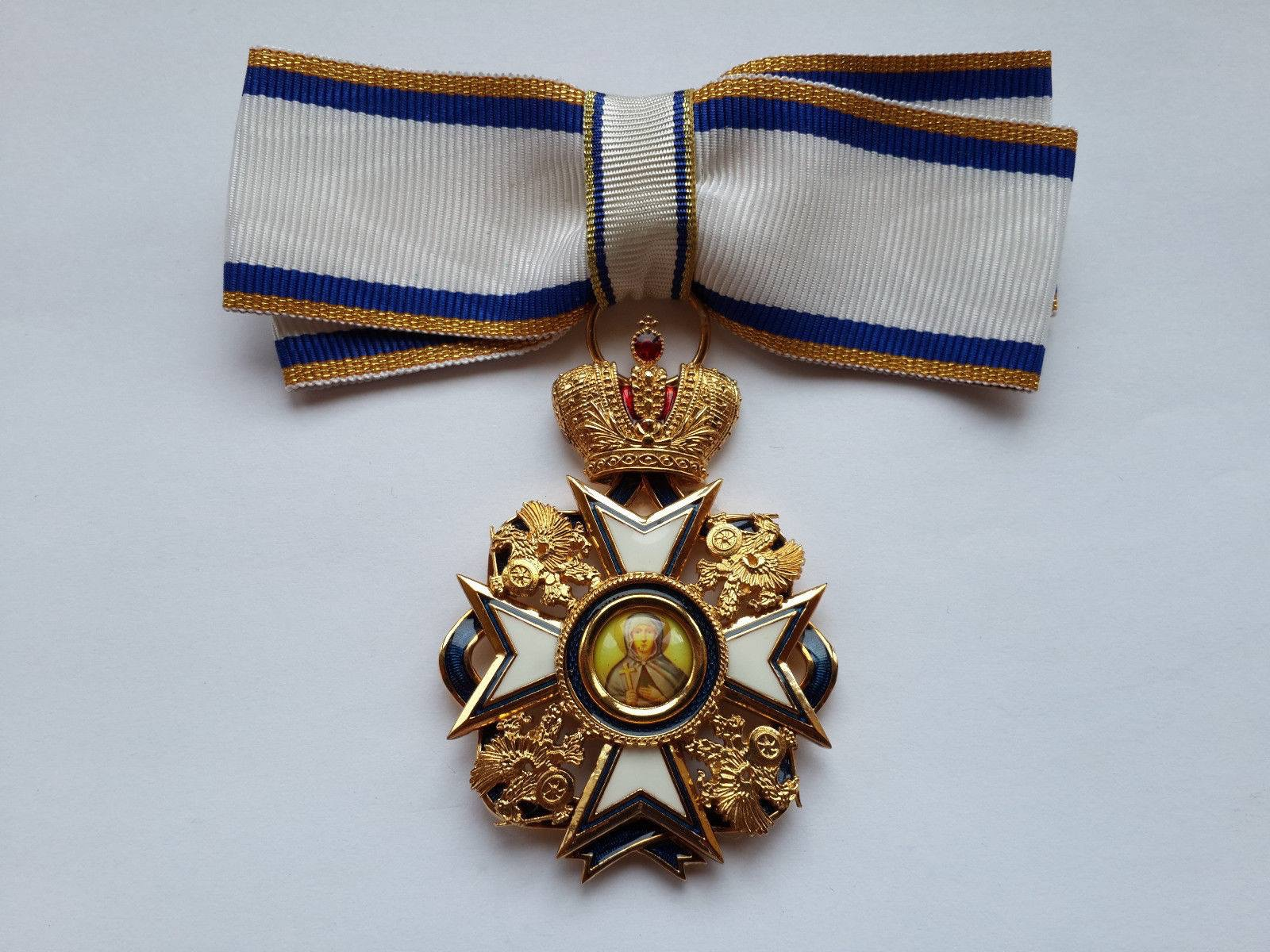

Awarded by Head of the House of Romanov
- Type: Dynastic Order
- Royal house: House of Romanov
- Religious affiliation: Russian Orthodox
- Status: Currently constituted
- Sovereign: Grand Duchess Maria Vladimirovna of Russia
- Grand Mistress: Grand Duchess Maria Vladimirovna of Russia
- Grades: Dame

Precedence
- Next (higher): Imperial Order of St. Nicholas the Wonderworker
- Next (lower): Imperial Order of St. Stanislaus
- Ribbon of the order

The Imperial Order of Saint Anastasia the Holy Great Martyr 'Alleviatrix of Captives' is a dynastic order of the former Russian Imperial House for women. It was established and its statutes approved on August 20, 2010 by Grand Duchess Maria Vladimirovna.

The order is composed of only one class. The feast days of the Order are celebrated on (22 December/4 January) Holy Great Martyr Anastasia the "Alleviatrix of Captives", and 7/20 August, the day of commemoration for the Tsaritsa consort Anastasia Romanovna.

== Creation ==
The order was established in honor of Saint Anastasia, the patron saint of the first Tsaritsa consort of the Romanov dynasty, Anastasia Romanovna (1530-1560). The creation of the order marked the 450th anniversary of the repose of Anastasia Romanovna, and was in anticipation of the 400th anniversary of the end of the time of troubles and the establishment of the House of Romanov in 2013.

The order is awarded by the head of the house exclusively to Russian women who have been distinguished by their acts in the fields of charity, culture, education, science, medicine, and other activities to benefit the Russian state or the Imperial House.

== Award Classes of the Order ==
The Order of St. Anastasia has only one class, Dame.

== The Insignia of the Order ==
The insignia of the Order consists of a white enamel cross with indented ends, edged in blue and gold with heraldically right-facing Romanov griffins in the axillae, on a white ribbon edged with blue and gold. The medallion of the device depicts in enamel the icon of the Holy Great Martyr Anastasia. The Cross is surmounted by an Imperial crown.

Dames of the Order of St. Anastasia the Holy Great Martyr wear the Device of the Order on the left side of the breast suspended from a ribbon, tied into a bow, 45 mm. in width.

== Recipients ==
- Grand Duchess Maria Vladimirovna, The Grand Duchess of Russia, founder, sovereign and Grand Mistress of the order.
- Natalia Poklonskaya, prosecutor of the Republic of Crimea (2014).
- Marie-Louise Coleiro Preca, 9th President of Malta (2017).
- Princess Victoria Romanovna (née Rebecca Virginia Bettarini) (2021).
- Carla Virginia Cacciatore (mother of Princess Victoria Romanovna) (2021).
- Matushka Irene Lukianov (widow of Protopresbyter Valery Lukianov) (2024).
