= Order of Saint Vladimir =

Imperial Russian order

Imperial Order of Saint Prince Vladimir
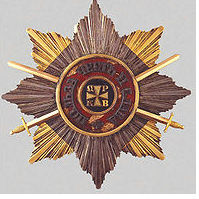
- Star of the Order

Awarded by the Emperor of All Russia
- Type: Dynastic Order
- Established: 3 October 1782
- Country: Russian Empire
- Royal house: House of Romanov
- Religious affiliation: Russian Orthodox Church
- Motto: "Benefit, Honour and Glory"
- Status: No longer awarded
- Grades: 1st, 2nd, 3rd, and 4th classes

Precedence
- Next (higher): Order of Saint George
- Next (lower): Order of Saint Anna
- Ribbon of the order

The Imperial Order of Saint Prince Vladimir (Russian: орден Святого Владимира) was an Imperial Russian order established on 3 October [O.S. 22 September] 1782 by Empress Catherine II in memory of the deeds of Saint Vladimir, the Grand Prince and the Baptizer of the Kievan Rus'.

== Grades ==
The order had four degrees and was awarded for continuous civil and military service. People who had been awarded with the St. Vladimir Order for military merits bore it with a special fold on the ribbon – "with a bow". There was a certain hierarchy of Russian Orders. According to this, the First Class Order of Saint Vladimir was the second one—the first was the Saint George Order—by its significance.

According to Russian laws on nobility, people who were awarded the Order of Saint Vladimir had the rights of hereditary nobility until the Emperor's decree of 1900 was issued. After this, only three first classes of the order gave such a right, the last one granting only personal nobility.

Today, Grand Duchess Maria Vladimirovna, claimant to the Headship of the Russian Imperial House, continues to award the Russian Imperial Order of Saint Vladimir as a dynastic order of knighthood. The validity of her awards is disputed by some historians and by some members of the Romanov Family Association.

=== Styles ===
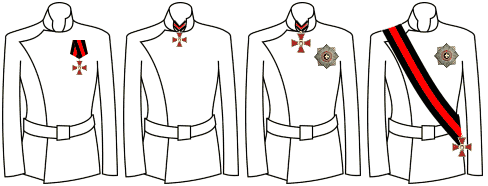
Grade styles

First class
A red cross with black and golden borders; the badge of the order depended from a sash worn over the right shoulder, and a gold-and-silver eight-rayed star was fastened over the left chest
Second class
The red cross on the neck and the star over the left chest
Third class
The red cross of a smaller size on the neck
Fourth class
The red cross over the left chest

== Insignia ==
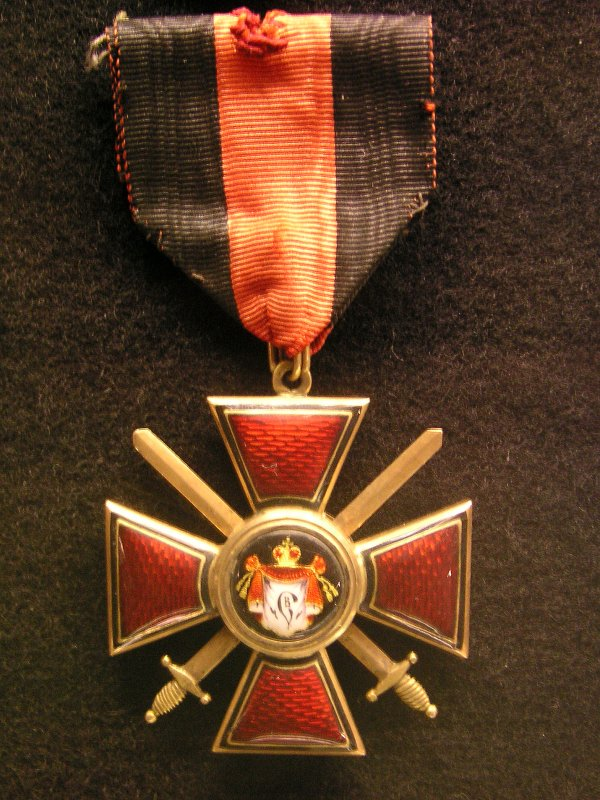
Fourth-class order

A red enamelled cross pattée with black enamelled borders, and a black enamelled central disc bearing a crowned red and ermine mantle with the monogram of Saint Vladimir. Worn on a sash by the first degree, on a necklet by the second and third degrees, and on a chest ribbon by the fourth degree.

A four-pointed star superimposed upon a four-pointed gold star, with a golden cross pattée and the letters "CPKB" between the arms of the cross on a black enamel background at the centre surrounded by the motto of the order "Benefit, Honour and Glory".

Worn on the left chest by the first and second degrees. This motto was transferred to present-day star of the Order of Merit for the Fatherland, which was established in 1992 by President Boris Yeltsin and is today the second highest ranking decoration of that country.
