= Grand Duke Kirill Vladimirovich of Russia =

Cousin of Tsar Nicholas II (1876–1938)

Grand Duke Kirill Vladimirovich
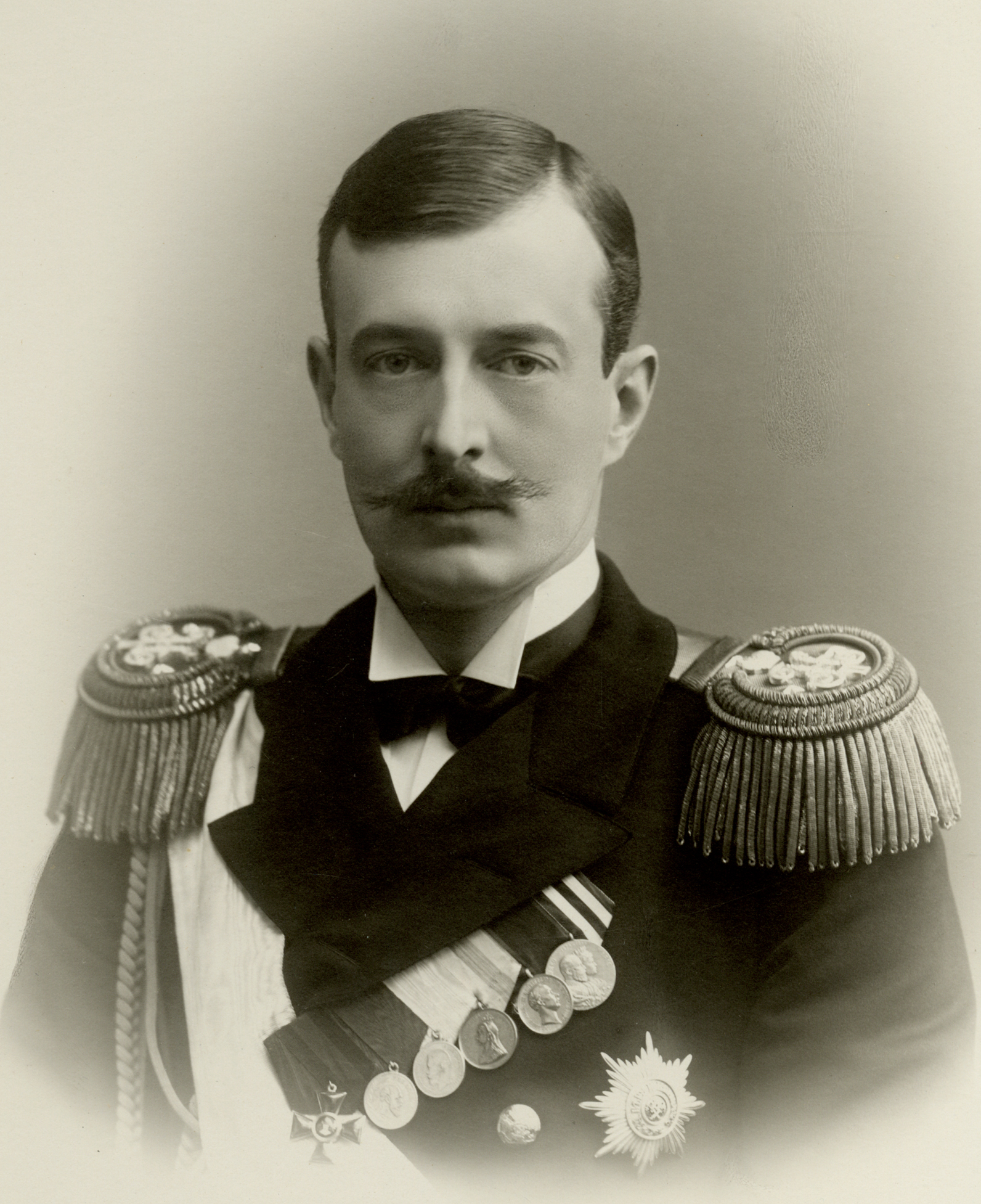
- Kirill in 1904

Head of the House of Romanov (disputed until 1929)
- Tenure: 31 August 1924 – 12 October 1938
- Predecessor: Nicholas II
- Successor: Vladimir
- Born: 12 October [O.S. 30 September] 1876; Tsarskoye Selo, Saint Petersburg, Russian Empire
- Died: 12 October 1938 (aged 62); Neuilly-sur-Seine, France
- Burial: Friedhof am Glockenberg, Coburg (1938–1995); Grand Ducal Mausoleum, Peter and Paul Fortress, Saint Petersburg (since 1995)
- Spouse: Princess Victoria Melita of Saxe-Coburg and Gotha (m. 1905; died 1936)
- Issue: Maria Kirillovna, Princess of Leiningen; Kira Kirillovna, Princess of Prussia; Grand Duke Vladimir Kirillovich of Russia
- House: Holstein-Gottorp-Romanov
- Father: Grand Duke Vladimir Alexandrovich of Russia
- Mother: Duchess Marie of Mecklenburg-Schwerin
- Religion: Russian Orthodox

Grand Duke Kirill Vladimirovich of Russia (Russian: Кирилл Владимирович Романов; Kirill Vladimirovich Romanov; 12 October [O.S. 30 September] 1876 – 12 October 1938) was a Russian grand duke and a claimant to the defunct Russian throne from 1924 until his death. He was the son of Grand Duke Vladimir Alexandrovich of Russia and a grandson of Emperor Alexander II.

Grand Duke Kirill followed a career in the Imperial Russian Navy serving for 20 years in the Naval Guards. He took part in the Russo-Japanese War, barely surviving the sinking of the battleship Petropavlovsk at Port Arthur in April 1904. In 1905, he married his paternal first cousin, Princess Victoria Melita of Saxe-Coburg and Gotha, defying Nicholas II by not obtaining his consent. They had two daughters and settled in Paris before they were allowed to visit Russia in 1909. In 1910 they moved to Russia. In World War I, Grand Duke Kirill was appointed Commander of the Naval Depot of the Guards in 1915. He achieved the rank of rear admiral in the Imperial Navy in 1916. During the February Revolution of 1917, Kirill marched to the Tauride Palace at the head of the Naval Guards and swore allegiance to the Russian Provisional Government. During the rule of the Provisional Government in the summer of 1917, Kirill escaped to Finland, where his wife gave birth to the couple's only son. In exile, they lived for some years among his wife's relatives in Germany and, from the late 1920s, on an estate they bought in Saint-Briac, France.

With the death of his cousins Nicholas II and Grand Duke Michael Alexandrovich, Kirill proclaimed himself to be the head of the House of Romanov and, as next in line to the throne, as "Guardian of the Throne" in 1924. Kirill proclaimed himself emperor-in-exile in 1926. He worked for the restoration of the monarchy from exile for the rest of his life, but his claims were contested by some factions of the monarchists in a division that continues today. He wrote a book of memoirs, My Life in Russia's Service, which was published after his death. His granddaughter, Maria Vladimirovna, is one of two claimants to the headship of the House of Romanov.

== Early life ==
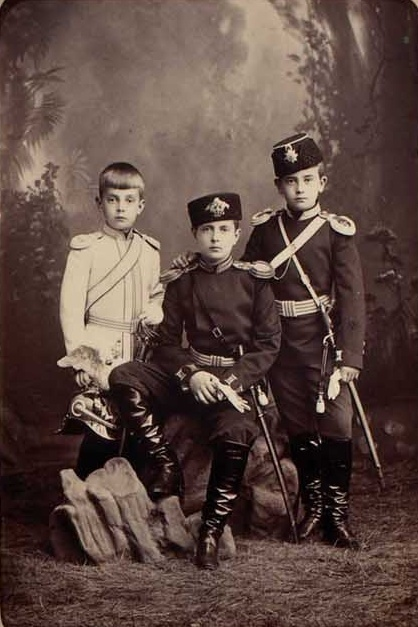
Kirill (centre) with his brothers Andrei (left) and Boris (right)

Grand Duke Kirill Vladimirovich of Russia was born on 12 October [O.S. 30 September] 1876 in Tsarskoye Selo, at his parents' country residence, the Vladimir Villa. His father was Grand Duke Vladimir Alexandrovich, the third son of Emperor Alexander II of Russia. His mother was Grand Duchess Maria Pavlovna, née Duchess Marie Alexandrine of Mecklenburg. As a grandson in the male line to a Russian Tsar, he was titled Grand Duke. Kirill's parents, wealthy and sophisticated, were influential figures in Russian society. Grand Duke Vladimir was cultured and a great patron of the arts, while Grand Duchess Maria Pavlovna was a renowned hostess in the Imperial capital. Both had imposing personalities and left a big imprint in the lives of Kirill and his siblings.

Grand Duke Kirill was six months old when his eldest brother, Alexander, died in childhood. He also had three younger siblings: Boris, Andrei, and Elena. The four surviving children were close to each other and to their parents, who were devoted to them. Kirill Vladimirovich grew up between his parents' residence in St Petersburg, the Vladimir Palace, and their country retreat, the Vladimir Villa in Tsarskoye Selo. Until he was fourteen years of age, Grand Duke Kirill was educated at home by private tutors. His education was supervised by General Alexander Daller, a retired artillery officer. He received military training and religion instruction, and learned the languages spoken by the Romanovs: Russian, English, French and German. During breaks from his daily lessons, he trained in a gym with his brothers at the Vladimir Palace. He traveled extensively with his parents visiting many European countries, including Spain. A love of music and carpentry work remained in him for the rest of his life. In 1911 he designed a propeller-driven sled that is considered to be one of the predecessors of the Aerosani.

== Naval career ==
From an early age, Grand Duke Kirill had a love for the sea and his parents encouraged him to follow a career in the Imperial Navy. At the age of fifteen, in autumn 1891, he began his training for the naval college. He began his naval career as a midshipman on the sail training ship Moriak in summer 1892. He returned to his home in Tsarkoe Selo in winter 1892, and spent the following year studying for his examinations at the naval college. From summer until autumn in 1893, he was back at sea training in the ship Prince Pojarsky. After joining his father on a long trip to Spain, in summer 1894, he joined his third training ship, the frigate Vovin. He concluded his training on the ship Vernyl on the Baltic Sea in summer 1895. Grand Duke Kirill's uncle, Tsar Alexander III, died on 1 November [O.S. 20 October] 1894 and Kirill's cousin, Nicholas II, became the new Tsar. During the coronation festivities in Moscow, Kirill fell in love with his paternal first cousin, Princess Victoria Melita of Saxe-Coburg and Gotha. They flirted with each other at the balls and celebrations, but Victoria Melita was already married to Ernest Louis, Grand Duke of Hesse, the only brother of Tsarina Alexandra.

In 1898, he took a trip around the world. One of his last stops was in New York in January 1899. He was invited to the newly formed Russian-speaking club "Rousskaia Beceda" and elected Honorary President.

After graduating from the Naval Cadet Corps and Nikolaev Naval Academy, on 1 January 1904, Kirill was promoted to Chief of Staff to the Russian Pacific Fleet in the Imperial Russian Navy. With the start of the Russo-Japanese War, he was assigned to serve as First Officer on the battleship Petropavlovsk, but the ship was blown up by a Japanese mine at Port Arthur in April 1904. Kirill barely escaped with his life, and was invalided out of the service suffering from burns, back injuries and shell shock.

== Marriage and children ==
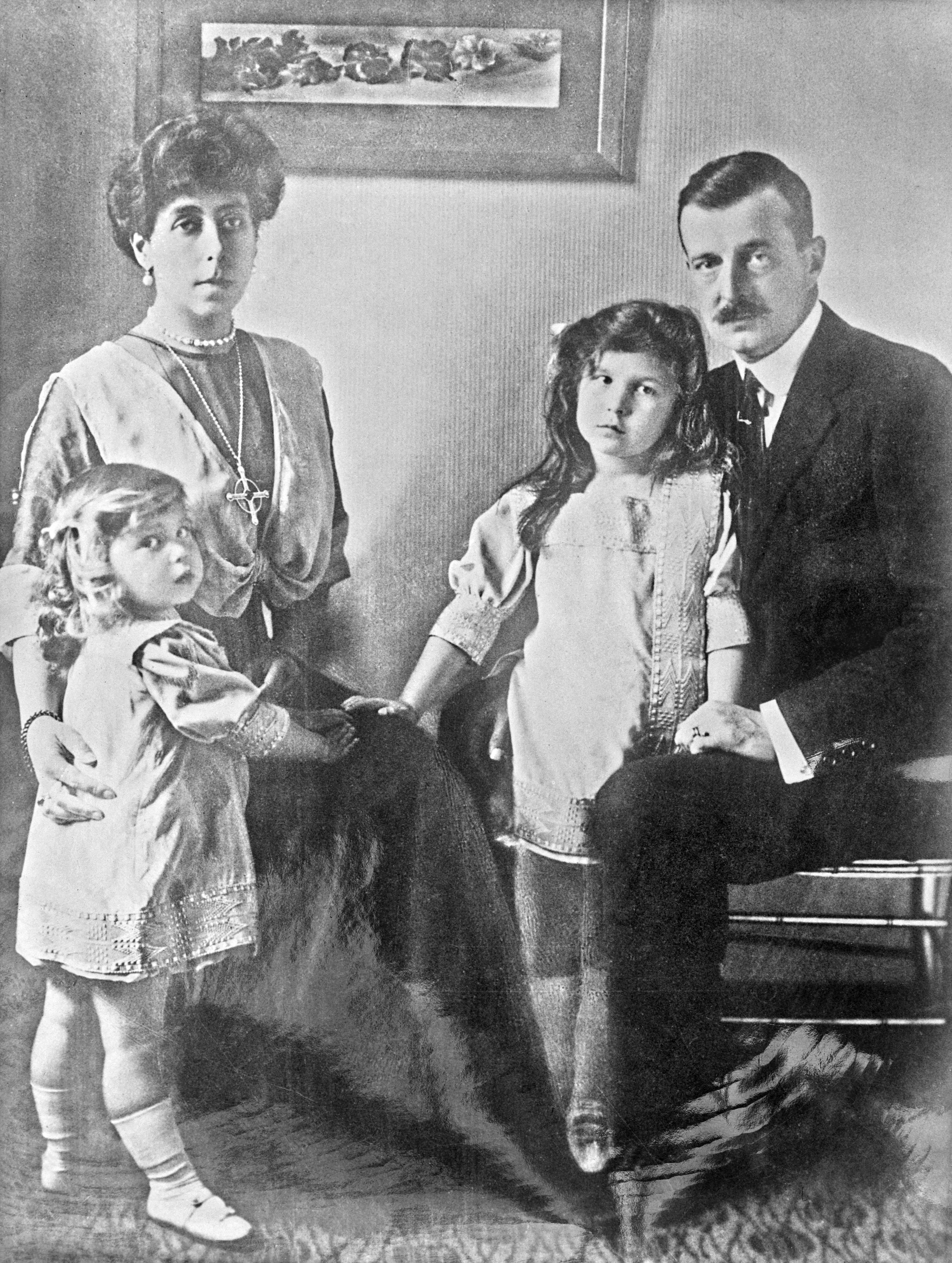
Kirill with his wife Victoria and their two daughters Marie and Kira

Grand Duke Kirill married his first cousin, Princess Victoria Melita of Saxe-Coburg and Gotha on 8 October 1905 without any consent from Tsar Nicholas II. Victoria's father was Alfred, Duke of Saxe-Coburg and Gotha, the second eldest son of Queen Victoria. Victoria's mother was Grand Duchess Maria Alexandrovna of Russia, a daughter of Tsar Alexander II and Kirill's paternal aunt.

The marriage caused a scandal in the courts of European royalty as Princess Victoria was divorced from her first husband, Grand Duke Ernest Louis of Hesse, also her first cousin. The Grand Duke of Hesse's sister was Tsarina Alexandra Feodorovna, the wife of Nicholas II. The Tsarina already disliked her former sister-in-law and first cousin, being instrumental in leading the opposition to the marriage in the Russian court. She was not alone in her opposition, Dowager Empress Maria Feodorovna was also appalled at the effrontery of Kirill's marriage. Shortly after Kirill's return to Russia, the Tsar stripped Kirill of his imperial allowance and title of Imperial Highness, his honours and decorations, his position in the navy and then banished him from Russia, though the style of Imperial Highness and title of Grand Duke was restored on 5 October 1905, shortly after Kirill left Russia

In 1908, after the death of Grand Duke Alexei Alexandrovich, Nicholas II restored Kirill to his rank of captain in the Imperial Russian Navy and his position as aide de camp to the emperor. He was given the title Grand Duke of Russia and from then on his wife was styled as Her Imperial Highness Grand Duchess Viktoria Feodorovna. From 1909–1912, Kirill served on the cruiser Oleg and was its captain in 1912. In 1913, he joined the Maritime Division of the Imperial Guard and was made Commander of the Naval Guards in 1915.

Grand Duke Kirill and Princess Victoria Melita had three children:

- Grand Duchess Maria Kirillovna of Russia (2 February 1907 – 27 October 1951) married Friedrich Karl, Prince of Leiningen on 25 November 1925. They had seven children.
- Grand Duchess Kira Kirillovna of Russia (9 May 1909 – 8 September 1967) married Louis Ferdinand, Prince of Prussia on 31 October 1938. They had seven children.
- Grand Duke Vladimir Kirillovich of Russia (30 August 1917 – 21 April 1992) married Princess Leonida Georgievna Bagration-Moukhransky on 13 August 1948. They had one daughter.

All the children were born to the rank of Prince and Princess of Russia, not entitled to the rank of Grand Duke or Grand Duchess as they were not children or grandchildren in the male line of a Russian Emperor according to the Pauline Laws. In accordance with these laws, Kirill raised his children to the rank of Grand Duke and Grand Duchess after assuming the position of senior male of the Romanov family, and Head of the Imperial House. This elevation was openly denounced by Grand Duke Nicholas Nikolaevich when he published a private letter of the Dowager Empress in 1924 in which she stated that Kirill's assumption of the position was "premature." The Dowager Empress believed that her sons and grandsons might still be alive in Russia. Grand Duke Kirill wrote to Grand Duchess Xenia "Nothing can be compared to what I shall now have to endure on this account, and I know full well I can expect no mercy from all the malicious attacks and accusations of vanity."

== Revolution ==
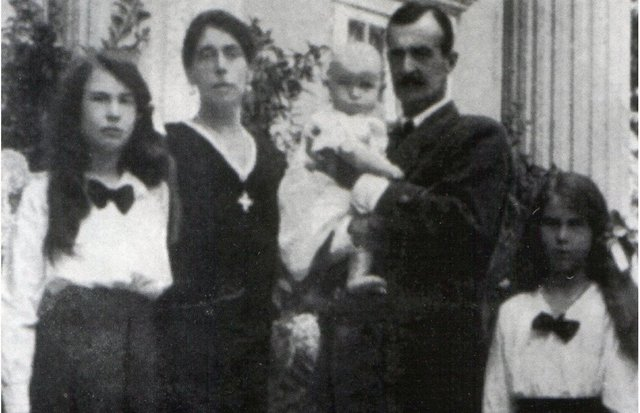
Grand Duke Kirill with his wife and their three children.

During the February Revolution of 1917, Kirill participated in a plan to establish a constitutional monarchy alongside Grand Duke Paul Alexandrovich and Grand Duke Michael Alexandrovich. Grand Duke Paul drafted a decree and planned to convince Nicholas to sign it when he disembarked from his train at Tsarskoye Selo on 1 March 1917. Mikhail and Kirill were supposed to deliver it to the Duma and request its implementation. However Kirill alone marched to the Tauride Palace at the head of the Garde Equipage (Marine Guard). Kirill had authorised the flying of a red flag over his palace on Glinka Street in Petrograd and in correspondence with a Romanov relative claimed credit for "saving the situation by my recognition of the Provisional Government". It is probable that he had hoped that by ingratiating himself with the Provisional Government he would be declared regent after Nicholas II was made to abdicate.

In June 1917 Kirill and Victoria moved to Finland and then escaped to Coburg in 1920. The exiled family subsequently moved to a small residence in the tiny French fishing village of Saint-Briac-sur-Mer.

== Life abroad ==
After a London court order in July 1924 recognized Grand Duke Michael to be legally dead, Kirill first declared himself "Guardian of the Throne" on 8 August 1924 and then on 31 August 1924 he assumed the title Emperor of all the Russias. By the laws of the Russian Empire he was the heir to the throne. However, his claim caused division within the family; his principal rival, and the only one to reject his claim was Grand Duke Nicholas. In 1926 at a (Russian) monarchists congress in Paris the delegates voted to recognize Grand Duke Nicholas as their leader; however, with Nicholas's death in 1929 Kirill became the undisputed leader of the monarchists.

After claiming the throne, Kirill became known as the "Soviet Tsar" because in the event of a restoration of the monarchy, he intended to keep some of the features of the Soviet regime. While living in exile, he was supported by some émigrés who styled themselves "legitimists" (legitimisti, in Russian легитимисты), underlining the "legitimacy" of Kirill's succession. The opponents of Kirill were known as the "un-predetermined" (nepredreshentsi, in Russian непредрешенцы); they believed that in the wake of the radical revolutionary events that the convening of a Zemsky Sobor was necessary in order to choose a new monarch for Russia.

Kirill found his strongest support among a group of legitimists known as the Mladorossi, a Russian émigré monarchist organization that ultimately became heavily influenced by fascism – although it distanced itself from other fascist movements. The organization began to exhibit pro-Soviet sympathies, arguing that the monarchy and the Soviet Bolshevik system could peacefully coexist (their slogan being "Tsar and the Soviets", a socialist version of the traditional "Tsar and People"). Kirill became more wary of the organization when he learned that its founder, Alexander Kazem-Bek, was spotted meeting with an OGPU agent. Kirill accepted Kazem-Bek's voluntary resignation.

Just before he died, he wrote his autobiography, My Life in Russia's Service – Then and Now which was published in 1939.

Kirill was succeeded by his son Vladimir Kirillovich who styled himself "Grand Duke and head of the Russian Imperial House".

Kirill was buried at the ducal mausoleum at Friedhof am Glockenberg, Coburg. Following the Dissolution of the Soviet Union, the remains of Kirill and his spouse were transferred from Coburg to the Grand Ducal Mausoleum of the Peter and Paul Fortress in St. Petersburg, Russia on 7 March 1995 after negotiations conducted by his granddaughter Maria Vladimirovna.

The imperial monogram of Grand Duke Cyril Vladimirovich

Among his activities he was close to members of the Nazi Party, when he was in Germany. On one occasion, he is said to have paid Erich Ludendorff "a sum of nearly half a million gold marks in 1922-1923 for German-Russian national matters".

== Honours ==
- Knight of the Order of St. Andrew, Russian Empire
- Knight of the Order of the Elephant, Kingdom of Denmark – 18 October 1928
- Knight Grand Cross of the Order of the Redeemer, Kingdom of Greece – January 1901 – during a visit to Greece
- Knight Grand Cross of the Order of the White Falcon, Grand Duchy of Saxe-Weimar-Eisenach – 1896
- (Austria-Hungary) Knight Grand Cross of the Royal Hungarian Order of St. Stephen, Austro-Hungarian Empire – 1897
- (French Third Republic) Knight Grand Cross of the Legion of Honour, French Republic – September 1897
- Knight Grand Cross of the Ludwig Order, Grand Duchy of Hesse and by Rhine – 12 October 1899
- Knight Grand Cross of the Order of the Tower and Sword, Kingdom of Portugal – 31 December 1903
- Knight Grand Cross of the Order of Henry the Lion, Duchy of Brunswick – 1907
- Knight of the Order of the Seraphim, Kingdom of Sweden – 13 July 1912
- Grand Cordon of the Supreme Order of the Chrysanthemum, Empire of Japan – 8 July 1898
- Knight of the Order of the Black Eagle, Kingdom of Prussia
- Knight of the Order of the Rue Crown, Kingdom of Saxony

== Portrayal ==
In the 1986 miniseries Anastasia: The Mystery of Anna, Sir Rex Harrison portrayed Kirill as an embittered and dangerous enemy to Anna Anderson, who notoriously claimed to be the Grand Duchess Anastasia.

== See also ==
- White émigré

Grand Duke Kirill Vladimirovich of Russia House of Holstein-Gottorp-Romanov Cadet branch of the House of Oldenburg Born: 12 October 1876 Died: 12 October 1938
Titles in pretence
Vacant Title last held by Nicholas II	— TITULAR — Emperor of Russia; 31 August 1924^{1} – 12 October 1938; Reason for succession failure: Empire abolished in 1917	Succeeded by Vladimir Cyrillovitch
Notes and references
1. Almanach de Gotha (182nd ed.). Almanach de Gotha. 1998. p. 214.
