= Grand Duke Vladimir Kirillovich of Russia =

Head of the House of Romanov from 1938 to 1992

Grand Duke Vladimir Kirillovich
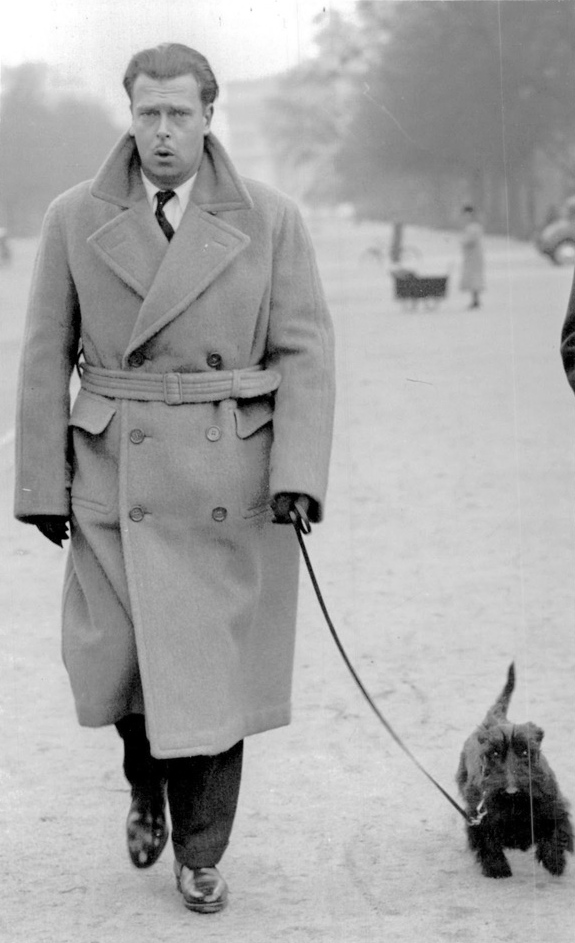
- Vladimir walking his dog at Champs-Élysées in Paris, 1938

Head of the House of Romanov
- Tenure: 12 October 1938 – 21 April 1992
- Predecessor: Kirill
- Successor: Maria Vladimirovna or Nicholas Romanovich
- Born: 30 August [O.S. 17 August] 1917; Porvoo, Grand Duchy of Finland, Russian Empire
- Died: 21 April 1992 (aged 74); Miami, Florida, United States
- Burial: Grand Ducal Mausoleum, Peter and Paul Fortress, St. Petersburg, Russia
- Spouse: Princess Leonida Bagration of Mukhrani (m. 1948)
- Issue: Grand Duchess Maria Vladimirovna of Russia
Names
- Vladimir Kirillovich Romanov
- House: Holstein-Gottorp-Romanov
- Father: Grand Duke Kirill Vladimirovich of Russia
- Mother: Princess Victoria Melita of Saxe-Coburg and Gotha

Grand Duke Vladimir Kirillovich of Russia (Russian: Владимир Кириллович Романов; 30 August [O.S. 17 August] 1917 – 21 April 1992) was a Russian aristocrat who was the Head of the Imperial Family of Russia, a position which he claimed from 1938 to his death in 1992.

== Early life ==
Vladimir was born Prince Vladimir Kirillovich of Russia at Porvoo in the Grand Duchy of Finland, the only son of Grand Duke Cyril Vladimirovich and Grand Duchess Viktoria Feodorovna (née Princess Victoria Melita of Saxe-Coburg and Gotha). Vladimir's paternal grandparents were Grand Duke Vladimir Alexandrovich of Russia and Grand Duchess Maria Pavlovna (née Duchess Marie of Mecklenburg-Schwerin). His maternal grandparents were Alfred, Duke of Saxe-Coburg and Gotha (the second son and fourth child of Queen Victoria) and Grand Duchess Marie Alexandrovna of Russia. He was described as a large and handsome child, who resembled his granduncle Alexander III.

Vladimir's family had fled to Finland after the Russian Revolution of 1917. His family left Finland in 1920, moving to Coburg, Germany. On 8 August 1922 Vladimir's father declared himself Curator of the Russian throne. Two years later on 31 August 1924 his father went a step further and assumed the title Emperor and Autocrat of all the Russias. With his father's assumption of the Imperial title Vladimir was granted the title of Tsesarevich (heir apparent) and Grand Duke with the style of Imperial Highness. In 1930 his family left Germany for Saint-Briac, France where his father set up his court.

In the 1930s Vladimir lived for a period in England studying at the University of London and working at the Blackstone agricultural equipment factory in Lincolnshire. He later returned to France moving to Brittany where he became a landowner.

== Russian heir and World War II ==
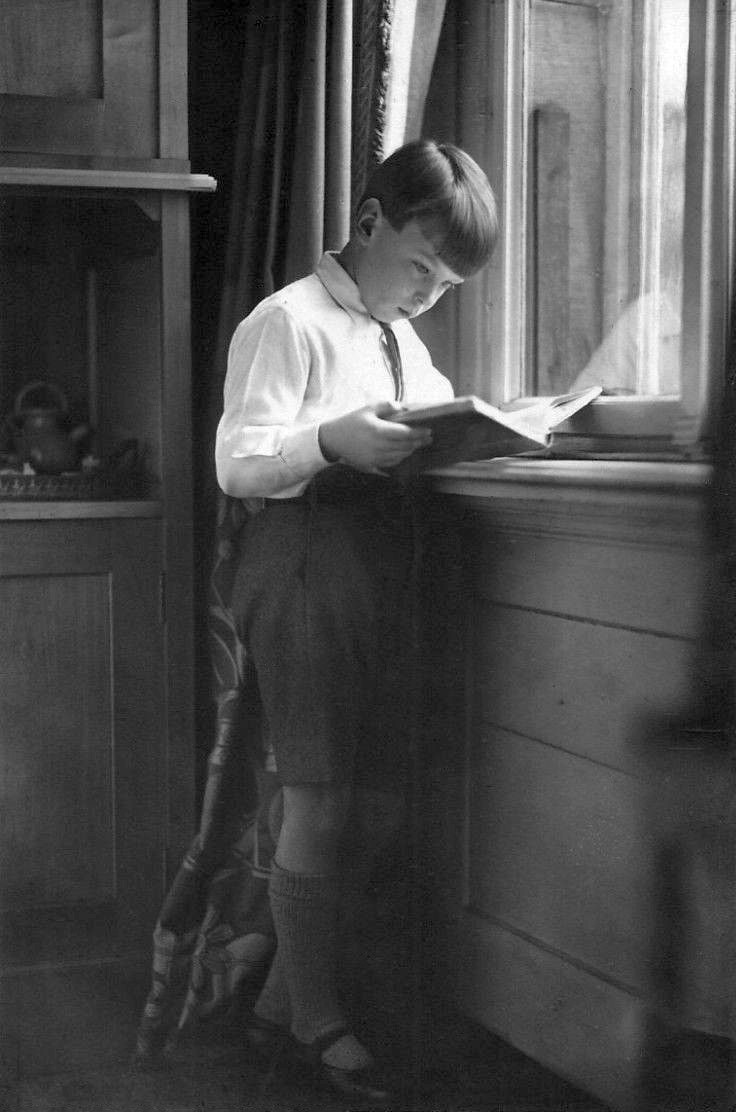
Vladimir in 1925

On the death of his father on 12 October 1938, Vladimir assumed the Headship of the Imperial Family of Russia. In 1938 there were suggestions that he would be made regent of Ukraine but he rebuffed the idea, saying he would not help dissolve Russia.

During World War II, Vladimir was living in Saint-Briac-sur-Mer in Brittany. On June 26, 1941, he issued this statement: "In this grave hour, when Germany and almost all the nations of Europe have declared a crusade against Communism and Bolshevism, which has enslaved and oppressed the people of Russia for twenty-four years, I turn to all the faithful and loyal sons of our Homeland with this appeal: Do what you can, to the best of your ability, to bring down the Bolshevik regime and to liberate our Homeland from the terrible yoke of Communism." In 1942, Vladimir and his entourage were placed in an internment camp at Compiègne after he refused to issue a manifesto calling on Russian émigrés to support Nazi Germany's war against the Soviet Union.

In 1944 the German army moved the family inland out of fear of an invasion from the coast. The Germans were taking them to Paris when an order to drive to Vittel was given. Even Vittel proved to be unsafe, so they were moved to Germany. Vladimir lived in a castle belonging to the husband of his elder sister Maria Kirillovna in Amorbach, Bavaria until 1945. After Germany's defeat, Vladimir's fear of being captured by the Soviets prompted relocation to Austria and next to the border of Liechtenstein. He tried to move with General Boris Smyslovsky's army and cross the border, but neither Liechtenstein nor Switzerland would issue him an entry visa, so he stayed in Austria where he lived in the American occupation zone.

Vladimir's maternal aunt, Infanta Beatrice of Orléans-Borbon, secured for him a Spanish visa. He subsequently lived with her in Sanlúcar de Barrameda.

== Post war and marriage ==
After the war he spent most of his time in Madrid, with frequent stays at his property in Brittany, as well as in Paris.

Vladimir married Princess Leonida Georgievna Bagration-Moukhransky on 13 August 1948 in Lausanne. Pre-revolutionary Romanov house law dictated that only those born of an "equal marriage" between a Romanov dynast and a member of a "royal or sovereign house", were included in the Imperial line of succession to the Russian throne; children of morganatic marriages were ineligible to inherit the throne or dynastic status. The family to which Princess Leonida belonged, the Bagrationi dynasty, had been kings in Georgia from the medieval era until the early 19th century, but no male line ancestor of hers had reigned as a king in Georgia since 1505 and her branch of the Bagrationis, the House of Mukhrani, had been naturalised among the non-ruling nobility of Russia after Georgia was annexed to the Russian Empire in 1801. Yet the royal status of the House of Bagrationi had been recognized by Russia in the 1783 Treaty of Georgievsk and was confirmed by Vladimir Kirillovich on 5 December 1946 as claimed head of the Russian imperial house. However the last ruling emperor of Imperial Russia Nicholas II had deemed marriage in this family of Princess Tatiana Constantinova in 1911, as morganatic. Some controversy therefore arises as to whether Vladimir's marriage to Leonida was equal or morganatic, and whether his claim to the Imperial throne validly passed to his daughter Maria, to some other dynast, or to no one upon his death.

Following Vladimir's public designation of his daughter as "curatrix of the throne", in anticipation that she would eventually succeed him as head of the dynasty in exile, the heads of three of the other branches of the imperial family — the Princes Vsevolod Ioannovich (Konstantinovichi), Roman Petrovich (Nikolaevichi) and Andrei Alexandrovich (Mihailovichi) — wrote to Vladimir in 1969, asserting that the dynastic status of his daughter was no different from that of their own children (Vsevolod Ioannovich was childless, but Roman Petrovich had two sons by Countess Prascovia Sheremetyev, while Andrei Alexandrovich had two sons by Donna Elisabeth Ruffo of a Russian branch of the Princes di San Sant' Antimo) and that his wife was of no higher status than the wives of the other Romanov princes.

In 1952 he called on the Western powers to wage war against the Soviet Union. On 23 December 1969 Vladimir issued a controversial decree whereby in the event he predeceased the living male Romanovs that he recognised as dynasts then his daughter Maria would become the "Curatrix of the Imperial Throne". This has been viewed as an attempt by Vladimir to ensure the succession remained in his branch of the imperial family, while the heads of the other branches declared that Vladimir's actions were illegal.

Vladimir was able to visit Russia in November 1991 when he was invited to visit St Petersburg by its Mayor Anatoly Sobchak.

== Death and succession dispute ==
Grand Duke Vladimir died while addressing a gathering of Spanish-speaking bankers and investors in Northern Trust Bank Miami in the United States on 21 April 1992. His body was returned to Russia and he was buried in the Peter and Paul Fortress in St. Petersburg, the first Romanov to be honoured in this way since before the revolution. The press noted that the funeral "was regarded by civic and Russian authorities as an obligation to the Romanov family rather than a step toward restoration of the monarchy." As he was only a great-grandson of a recognized Russian emperor, his claimed title of "Grand Duke of Russia" caused problems as to what to put on his tombstone.

After his death, his daughter Maria Vladimirovna assumed the headship of the Imperial Family of Russia according to his branch's interpretation of the Russian house laws. This was disputed by Nicholas Romanov, Prince of Russia who had been chosen president of the self-styled "Romanov Family Association" prior to the death of Grand Duke Vladimir.

== Honours ==
- Prussian Imperial and Royal Family: Knight of the Order of the Black Eagle

== Ancestry ==
Ancestors of Grand Duke Vladimir Kirillovich of Russia

8. Alexander II of Russia
4. Grand Duke Vladimir Alexandrovich of Russia
9. Princess Marie of Hesse and by Rhine
2. Grand Duke Kirill Vladimirovich of Russia
10. Frederick Francis II, Grand Duke of Mecklenburg-Schwerin
5. Duchess Marie of Mecklenburg-Schwerin
11. Princess Augusta Reuss of Köstritz
1. Grand Duke Vladimir Kirillovich of Russia
12. Prince Albert of Saxe-Coburg and Gotha
6. Alfred, Duke of Saxe-Coburg and Gotha
13. Victoria, Queen of the United Kingdom
3. Princess Victoria Melita of Saxe-Coburg and Gotha
14. Alexander II of Russia (= 8)
7. Grand Duchess Maria Alexandrovna of Russia
15. Princess Marie of Hesse and by Rhine (= 9)

== Bibliography ==
- Léonida, Grande-duchesse de Russie (2000). Chaque matin est une grace (in French). Éditions Jean-Claude Lattès. ISBN 2709621622.
- Massie, Robert K. (1995). The Romanovs The Final Chapter. Jonathan Cape. ISBN 0-224-04192-4.
- Prassoloff, Boris (2024). Tsars sans empire : Les prétendants Romanov en exil 1919–1992 (in French). Paris: Éditions Perrin. ISBN 978-2262103415.

Grand Duke Vladimir Kirillovich of Russia House of Holstein-Gottorp-Romanov Cadet branch of the House of Oldenburg Born: 30 August 1917 Died: 21 April 1992
Titles in pretence
Preceded by Cyril Vladimirovich	— TITULAR — Emperor of Russia; 12 October 1938 – 21 April 1992; Reason for succession failure: Empire abolished in 1917	Succeeded by Disputed; Maria Vladimirovna or Nicholas Romanovich
