= Grand Duke Boris Vladimirovich of Russia =

Russian grand duke (1877–1943)

Grand Duke Boris Vladimirovich
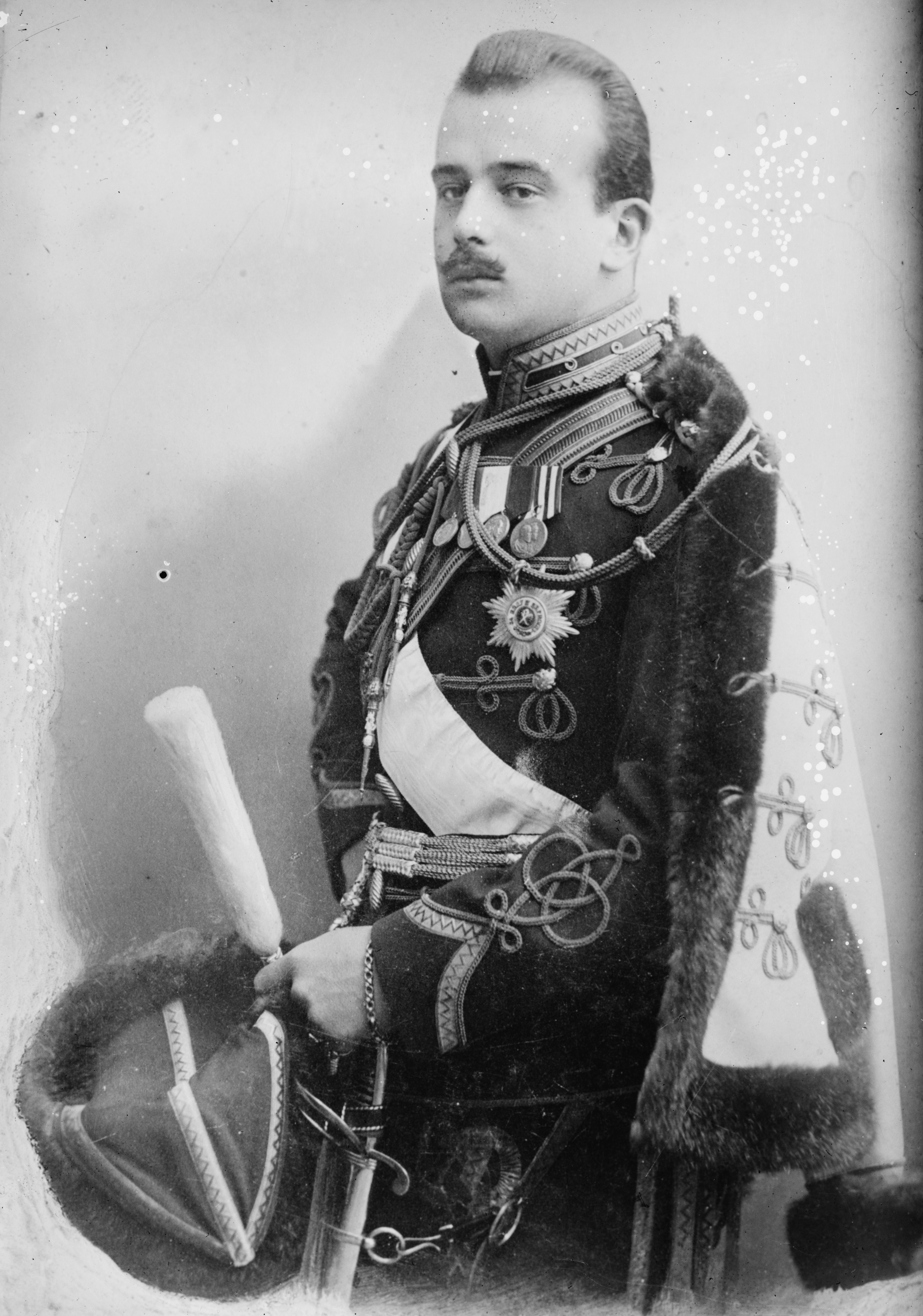
- Boris, circa 1900
- Born: 24 November 1877; Saint Petersburg, Russian Empire
- Died: 9 November 1943 (aged 65); Paris, France
- Spouse: Zinaida Rashevskaya (m. 1919)
- Issue: Boris Lacroix
- House: Holstein-Gottorp-Romanov
- Father: Grand Duke Vladimir Alexandrovich
- Mother: Marie of Mecklenburg-Schwerin

Grand Duke Boris Vladimirovich of Russia (Russian: Борис Владимирович; 24 November 1877 – 9 November 1943) was a son of Grand Duke Vladimir Alexandrovich of Russia, a grandson of Tsar Alexander II of Russia and a first cousin of Tsar Nicholas II.

He followed a military career. After graduating from the Nicholas Cavalry College in 1896, he served as cornet in the Life Guards Hussar regiment. He took part in the Russo-Japanese War in 1904 and became a major general in the Russian Army in 1914. During World War I, he commanded the regiment of the Ataman Cossacks in 1915. He was known in Imperial Russia for his restless behavior and as a notorious playboy.

After the fall of the Russian monarchy, he was put under house arrest in Petrograd by the provisional government in March 1917, but he managed to escape the former Imperial capital in September that year and joined his mother and younger brother in the Caucasus. He departed revolutionary Russia in March 1919 with his longtime mistress, whom he married in exile. Eventually, he settled in France where he spent the rest of his life. He died in Occupied Paris in 1943.

== Early life ==
Grand Duke Boris Vladimirovich was born on 24 November [O.S. 12 November] 1877 at his parents' palace in Saint Petersburg. He was the third child and second surviving son among the five children of Grand Duke Vladimir Alexandrovich of Russia and his wife Grand Duchess Maria Pavlovna, née Duchess Marie Alexandrine of Mecklenburg-Schwerin.

His parents were very wealthy and lived in the luxurious Vladimir Palace in Saint Petersburg. His father, Vladimir Alexandrovich, a brother of Tsar Alexander III of Russia, was a renowned patron of the arts; his mother, Maria Pavlovna, one of the greatest hostesses of Russian society. Boris, more extroverted than his siblings, was his mother's favorite.

Grand Duke Boris was educated at home. He initially was raised by a British nanny, the first language he spoke was English. As was customary in the Russian Imperial family, Boris and his siblings also have a sailor "nanny", a male attendant from the Imperial navy, who served as the children's companion looking after them. Boris Vladimirovich's education emphasized languages and military training. The parents chose the tutors, governors and friends for their children with care. The four siblings spent most of their time at their parents villa in Tsarkoe Selo where they had a lot of freedom and were able to visit a park with a pond.

It was traditional for the male members of the Romanov family to follow a military career. From his birth, Grand Duke Boris was appointed patron of the 45th Azov Infantry Regiment, and enrolled into the Semeonovsky Life Guards and the Life Guards Dragoon regiment, the 4th Life Guard Rifle Battalion of the Imperial Family. In 1896, at the age of eighteen, he graduated from the Nikolaievsky Cavalry School with the rank of Cornet of the Life Guards Hussar Regiment. The following year, he was appointed aide-de-camp to the Emperor.

== A Russian Grand Duke ==
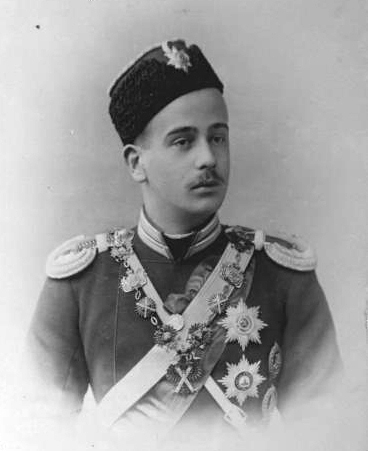
Grand Duke Boris in his youth

At age eighteen, upon coming of age, Grand Duke Boris received from his father a plot of land at Tsarskoye Selo on the eastern bank of the Kolonistky pond near the Moskovskaya Gate. There, in 1895, the Grand Duke built his own residence in the style of an English country house. All the materials were imported from England and construction was finished in less than a year. The estate, named Wolf Garden, compromised a cottage, coach house, stables, and a small tea house, where the grand duke could entertain his friends. The interiors were designed by Maples importing everything from England. To complement the British atmosphere, the servants were hired from England including a British butler. Boris Vladimirovich lived in Wolf Garden all year round while still serving in the army. The property was run as a modern farm and in 1899 a small house was added for the servants.

From his early youth Boris was notorious for his restless life style. He was an extrovert, very social, he liked to drink, gamble and womanizing. He became a famous playboy. In 1896 during the coronation ceremonies of Tsar Nicholas II, he flirted with Crown Princess Marie of Romania, who was his first cousin and was already married. The next year, he visited her in Bucharest, fueling more rumors. She said that "he had an attractive, rather husky voice, kind eyes, and humorous smile, which crinkled his forehead into unexpected lines. Not exactly handsome, he had nevertheless great charm." The grand duke also got entangled with a Mademoiselle Demidov. He was the cause of her engagement breaking off on the eve of her wedding. The famous ballerina Anna Pavlova was one of Boris' lovers. Princess Catherine Radziwill called him "the terror of jealous husbands as well as of watchful mothers". His trips abroad became legendary, his escapades in doubtful taste. He drank in the company of spongers and prostitutes.

Although loaded with wealth and privilege, Grand Duke Boris found his income insufficient and ran up a huge debt of nearly half a million rubles with his mother. In one year, he spent more than 25,000 rubles for meals, 16,000 for servants and 8,000 for automobiles, giving 46 rubles to the church. His mother protected him from the wrath of the family.

In 1901, Grand Duke Boris, age twenty five, had a liaison with a Frenchwoman, Jeanne Aumont-Lacroix, and had a son by her, born in Paris. The child, Jean Boris Lacroix (1902–1984), was not recognized. To break the relationship and strengthen his character Boris's parents sent him, with the Tsar's approval, on a world tour.

== World tour ==
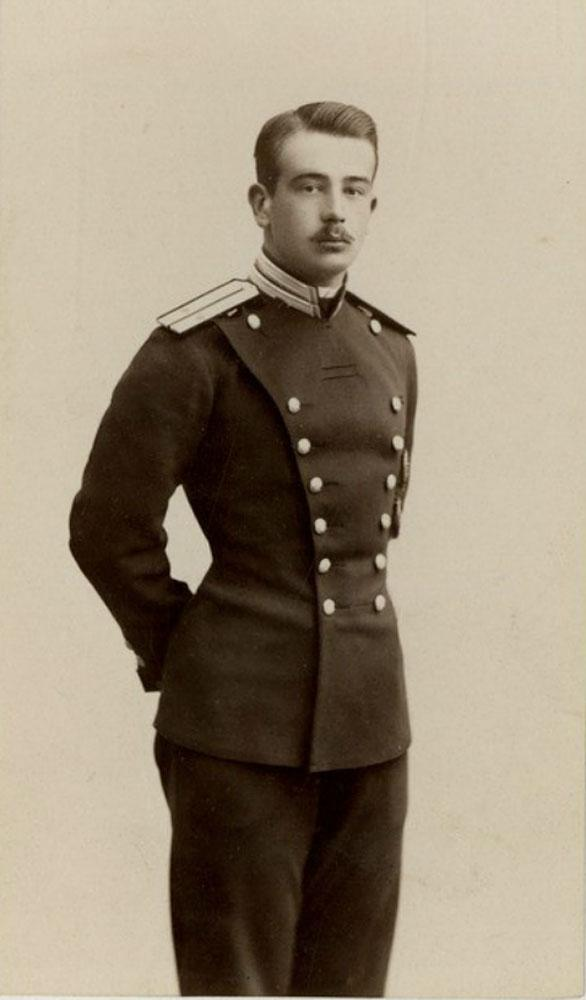
Grand Duke Boris Vladimirovich. Late 1890s.

Grand Duke Boris' tour around the world lasted from 6 January 1902 [O.S. 24 December 1901] until 20 October [O.S. 7 October] 1902. It began in France, when in the autumn 1901, he met with his parents and brother Kirill in Paris. As there was an unexpected delay in the expedition, he spent the holidays with his aunt Grand Duchess Maria Alexandrovna and his cousin Victoria Melita in their winter home in Nice. The long trip began in January 1902 on board the German ship Bremen, accompanied by a large entourage. He visited Egypt and later India. He was a guest of Maharaja Surjyakanta Acharya Chowdhury of Muktagacha, Mymensingh now in Bangladesh. He was a guest of the Maharaja of Kapurthala in his kingdom near Punjab where he went tiger hunting. His trip continued with stops in Ceylon and French Indochina. He spent eight days in Siam as guest of King Chulalongkorn. After that, he visited Japan, and on his way to the United States, he stopped in Honolulu.

On 1 August 1902, Grand Duke Boris arrived in San Francisco where he toured the city; attended the opera and went to a boxing match. His visit to the United States drew a great deal of attention from American newspapers. A journalist in California described him as "a handsome young man of very pleasant manner who spoke good English." While in Chicago it was reported that he drank champagne from the satin slipper of a chorine from The Wizard of Oz and tipped showgirls with $20 bills. He claimed that those stories had been fabricated. He then spent two weeks in Newport, Rhode Island where he was entertained by the American society of the Gilded Age. In Newport, Boris Vladimirovich was invited to dinners and parties, he played tennis and even learned to play golf. He continued his trip sailing to New York City in Cornelius Vanderbilt's yacht. The grand duke was favorably impressed with the city's skyline and the modern use of electricity Boris visited President Theodore Roosevelt at his estate Sagamore Hill, on the North Shore of Long Island. Because his bad reputation had preceded him, First Lady Edith Roosevelt, who regarded his presence as both "a scandal and an insult" was conspicuously absent. After six hectic weeks in America, Grand Duke Boris sailed back to Europe.

Jovial and increasingly stout, Boris was famous for his wild and unpredictable behavior, but eventually these excesses began to lose their appeal. He remarked to his brother Kirill, "After a while every woman is the same, nothing is new except the face".

In October 1903, he enlisted in the Tsar's retinue. On 26 February, he left Russia for the Far East to take part in the Russo-Japanese War. He served under the command of the Russian governor in the Far East at the headquarters of the commander in chief of the Army, General A.N. Kuropatkin, taking part in combat

On the morning of 31 March 1904, while galloping from the heights of Dacha Hill on the rim of Port Arthur, he witnessed the sinking of the Russian battleship Petropavlovsk in which more than 600 men died; his brother Grand Duke Kirill was among the few survivors. In December 1904, for his bravery in battle, he was awarded a golden sword with the inscription For Courage and was promoted to staff captain.

In 1905, in Nice, Grand Duke Boris proposed to Princess Victoria Eugenia of Battenberg. They had met two years before in the Isle of Wight. She was seventeen years old and hesitated, deciding to postpone her decision until she had made her debut in society. By then she had forgotten about Boris and in the next season she met her future husband King Alfonso XIII of Spain.

1911 was a busy year for the grand duke. He was made colonel and in April he represented Russia at the Turin World Fair and the Fine Arts Exhibition in Rome during the celebrations for the 50th anniversary of Italy's unification. On 22 June 1911, he represented his cousin Tsar Nicholas II at the coronation of Britain's King George V in Westminster Abbey. In November the same year, he was Russia's emissary at the coronation of Vajiravudh the King of Siam. On his way back to Europe, he visited Egypt and Greece. Between 1910 and 1914, he wore the uniform of colonel of His Imperial Highness the Tsarevich Atamansky Guards Cossack Regiment. In 1914, he became a major general.

== War ==
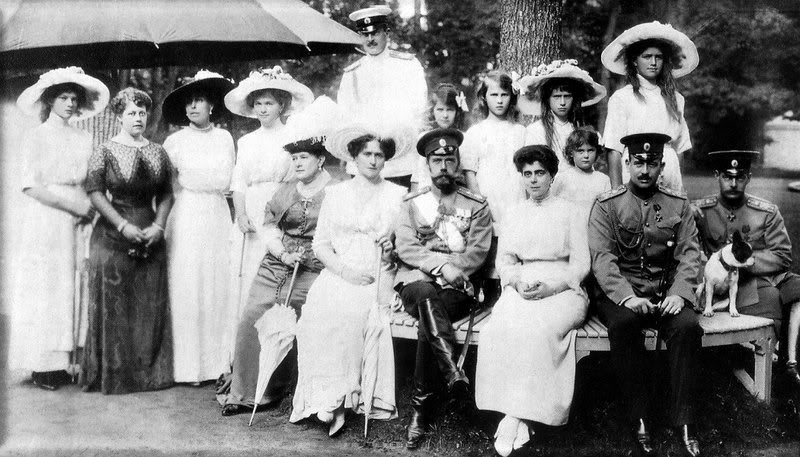
Grand Duke Boris with the Imperial family. From left to right:Grand Duchess Tatiana, Duchess Marie Antoinette of Mecklenburg Schwerin, Grand Duchess Victoria Feodorovna, Grand Duchess Olga, Grand Duke Kirill, Princess Elizabeth of Greece, Princess Olga of Greece, Grand Duchess Anastasia, Grand Duchess Maria. In the foreground : Grand Duchess Maria Pavlovna, Empress Alexandra, Tsar Nicholas II, Grand Duchess Elena, Princess Marina of Greece, Grand Duke Boris, Grand Duke Andrei.

When World War I broke out, Boris Vladimirovich was put in command of the Guards regiment of the Ataman Cossacks. It was a nominal position, and he managed to stay away from the fighting. He commanded this regiment during the War between 1914 and 1915. Thereafter, he was attached to the general headquarters and was made Field Ataman for the commander in chief on 17 September 1915. He served in the army without real distinction. His military responsibilities were only vaguely defined and he did not change his ways during the war, continuing his life of pleasure and idleness. Military service was a burden to Boris, who sought every opportunity that would make him return to St. Petersburg. Even during the war Grand Duke Boris gave many parties at his luxurious mansion, furnished in the English style, which at night was a gathering place for the "golden youth" of St. Petersburg. The grand duke was famous for his hospitality, cheerful disposition, passion for entertainment, gourmet cuisine and excellent wines.

In spite of Boris' reputation, his ambitious mother wanted to arrange a splendid marriage for him. In February 1916, she tried to marry him to Grand Duchess Olga Nikolaevna, Tsar Nicholas II's eldest daughter. She was his first cousin once removed. Olga, overprotected by her parents, was an inexperienced girl of twenty. Boris was thirty-eight with a long line of mistresses linked to his name. Tsarina Alexandra Feodorovna turned him down. The refusal provoked the enmity of Boris' mother. Maria Pavlovna and her family, the "Vladimirovichi", plotted to depose Tsar Nicholas II and gain power themselves. Towards the end of the monarchy, they were involved in a conspiracy to put Boris' brother Kirill on the throne.

Boris' Anglophobia got him into trouble during the War. In June 1916, he was having supper at military headquarters while drunk, and in the presence of several officers of the British Military mission, he lambasted Great Britain. His behavior was so insulting that the British Ambassador made a formal protest, and Boris was forced by the Emperor to apologize.

By the summer of 1916, Grand Duke Boris fell in love with Zinaida Sergeievna Rachevskaya (1896–1963), the daughter of Colonel Sergei Alexandrovich Rachevsky, who had died in 1904 commanding the fortifications at Port Arthur. The couple had met at a ball towards the end of the previous year. Zinaida, a vivacious brunette twenty years younger than Boris, belonged to the minor Russian nobility. In late 1916, Zinaida was pregnant. Grand Duke Boris would have liked to marry her, but as he was close in line to the Russian throne a morganatic marriage would not have been authorized. To get out of his predicament, Boris quickly arranged Zinaida's marriage to Peter Eliseev, a military officer from a prestigious family who accepted the deal in exchange for the grand duke payment of his gambling debts. Immediately after the wedding, Zinaida was sent away to Genoa, where, at the beginning of January 1917, she gave birth a child who did not live. Back in Russia, a divorce was obtained for her. Grand Duke Boris began to live openly with his mistress at his dasha in Tsarskoye Selo as the Russian Empire began to crumble.

When Nicholas II abdicated, Boris was at Gatchina with Grand Duke Michael Alexandrovich, who declined the throne. This marked the fall of the Russian monarchy and Boris was one of the few members of the Romanov family who went to Mogilev to pay final respects to Tsar Nicholas II.

== Revolution ==
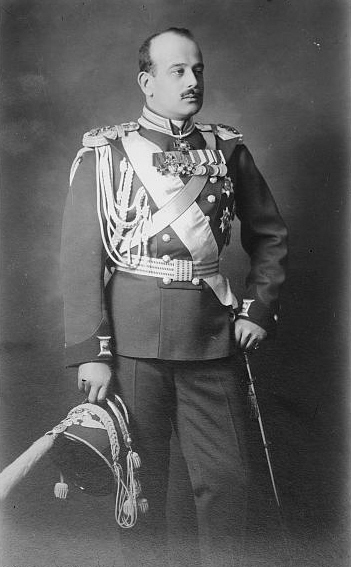
Grand Duke Boris during World War I.

During the period of the provisional government Boris Vladimirovich was living in Tsarskoye Selo. In March 1917, he was put under house arrest because of compromising correspondence with his mother. In July his arrest was lifted. In late August he was still in his dacha in Tsarskoe Selo. He was able to gain entrance to the Vladimir Palace. Disguised, with the help of Englishman Albert Stopford and a caretaker, Boris retrieved the money and jewels from the secret safe in his mother's bedroom. Stopford took the jewels to safety abroad, depositing them in a London bank.

Before the Bolsheviks took power, Boris escaped the former Imperial capital to the Caucasus with his mistress Zinaida Rachevskaya. In September 1917, he joined his mother and younger brother Grand Duke Andrei Vladimirovich in Kislovodsk, a spa and resort town in the Caucasus. He lived in a villa with his brother, but their mistresses were placed in separate houses, because Grand Duchess Maria Pavlovna would not acknowledge their existence. For the next year they lived quietly away from danger, but in August 1918 Boris and his brother Andrei were arrested in the night after a systematic search of their villa. They were taken to Piatigorsk with other prisoners and detained at the state hotel. They narrowly escaped with their lives. The Bolshevik commander sent to execute them had once been a struggling artist in Paris before the war whom Boris had helped by buying some of his paintings. The Bolshevik recognized him and, risking his own life, returned them to their villa the next day. Since they were no longer safe and would probably be arrested again, the two grand dukes decided to flee.

On 26 August 1918, armed with false papers stating they were on a mission for the soviets, Boris and Andrei escaped heading for Kabarda, where the chief Circassian tribe, the Kabards, lived on the north slope of the mountain. For a time they wandered from village to village. Kislovodsk was captured by the White Army and the Bolsheviks fled in late September, allowing the two brothers to return to the city on 6 October. However, two days later, under the threat of the Red advance, the small group of Romanovs and their entourage were forced to flee. In constant fear for their lives, the local White general advised them to travel to Anapa in the south. He arranged a train and an escort of his own men and they left Piatigorsk on 19 October, with their own companions and other local refugees. At Touapse a trawler was waiting, they docked at Anapa, a coastal city on the Black Sea on 22 October. From there it would be easier to escape abroad by boat. However, Grand Duchess Maria Pavlovna was determined to remain in Russia hoping that the White movement would prevail and Boris' brother Grand Duke Kirill Vladimirovich would be installed as Tsar. By March 1919 Boris decided to leave with his mistress. Against his mother's wishes, he left Russia from Anapa by boat through the Black Sea.

== Exile ==
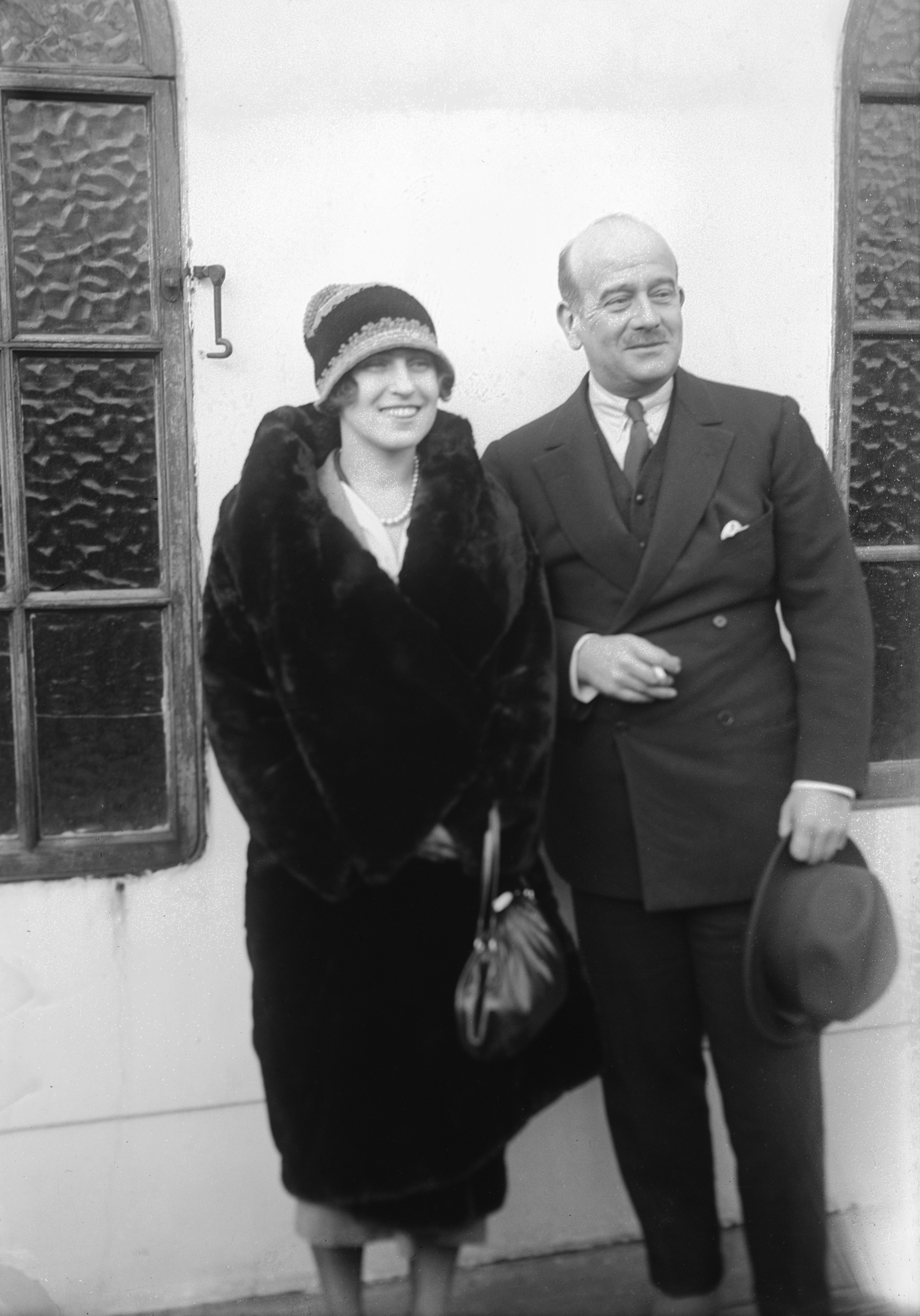
Grand Duke Boris and his wife during their visit to the US, 1925.

Once safe in exile in Constantinople, Boris tried to get permission to go to Britain but was refused passage on a British warship. His Anglophobia came back to haunt him and he was disliked by the British royal family. Boris and Zinaida went to France but were expelled after a few weeks. They wanted to settle in Spain, as Grand Duke Boris was a friend of King Alfonso XIII of Spain, but received no reply and settled in San Remo, instead. They were married at Genoa, Italy, on 12 July 1919. Eventually Boris and his wife settled provisionally in Nice, France. In 1922, they moved to a large residence at 18 Rue de Marignan, near the Champs-Élysées, with his wife, mother-in-law and a private secretary.

Boris and his siblings were reunited in exile in September 1920, at Contrexéville in the south of France, by the death of their mother Grand Duchess Maria Pavlovna. Boris inherited his mother's emeralds, the most valuable items of the Grand Duchess' jewel collection. He sold most of them. The emeralds included a famous necklace which at some point was bought by Cartier, and in turn resold to Barbara Hutton. They subsequently reset the stones and created an even more famous piece, which could be worn as a necklace or a tiara. With the money from the emeralds, and from an account with an American bank which he had opened prior to the Revolution, Boris bought a chateau, "Sans Souci", in Meudon near Paris, living comfortably with his wife. The couple had no children, but raised Zinaida's niece, Natasha.

In the winter of 1925 he and his wife, who claimed an interest in dress-making, sailed to New York City. He said that he just wanted to visit some friends and have a good time. When asked by a reporter whether Henry Ford was a financial supporter of the effort to restore the monarchy in Russia, Boris did not know who Henry Ford was. His brother, Grand Duke Kirill, wanted to restore the Russian monarchy and in 1924 proclaimed himself czar-in-exile, but Boris was largely uninterested in politics.

== Last years ==
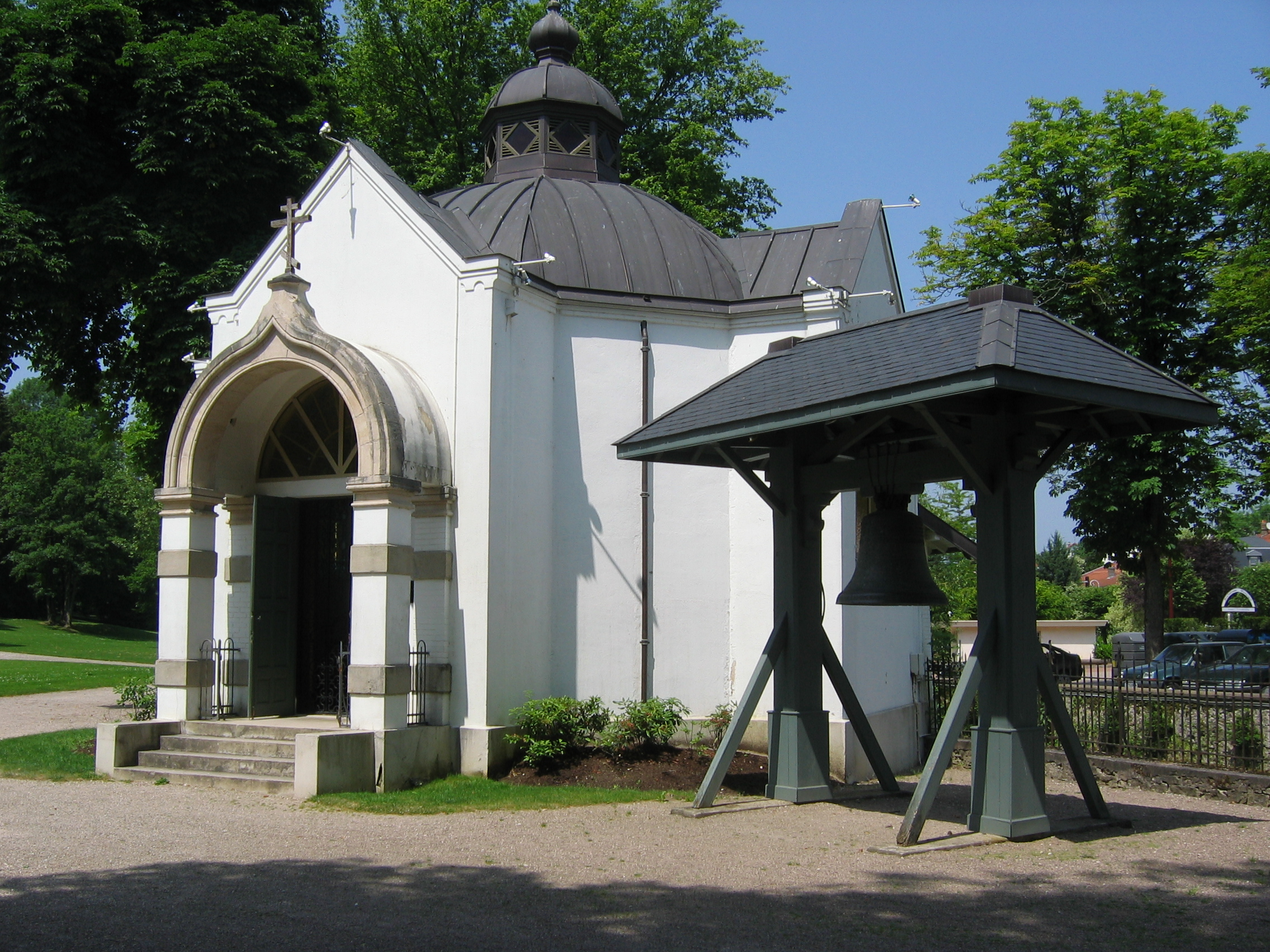
Chapel in Contrexéville where Boris and his mother are buried

During the long years of exile the former playboy-Grand Duke remained in love with his wife, who was twenty years his junior. He was deeply attached to her, and became involved with her family and circle of friends. Of the Romanovs, the couple was close only with Grand Duke Andrei Vladimirovich and his morganatic wife Mathilde Kschessinskaya. Zinaida was widely looked down upon by Boris' relatives.

In exile, Boris frequented his illegitimate son, Boris Lacroix, who had been raised in France by his mother's family. Lacroix's mother, Jeanne, already deceased, was buried in Père Lachaise cemetery. Boris often visited his son, who became a famous designer under the name Jean Boris Lacroix.

During World War II, Boris and Zinaida were at their villa in Biarritz when German troops occupied Paris in June 1940. Fleeing the French capital Grand Duke Andrei Vladimirovich and his wife Mathilde came to live with Boris. On 26 June the Germans reached Biarritz, and after three months the two couples decided to return to Paris. At the end of 1942, during the German occupation, they sold their estate in Meudon, and moved to a house in the Rue de la Faisanderie in Paris.

In 1943, Grand Duke Boris became critically ill, and died in his bed on 9 November 1943, in Paris, at age 65. His obituary was only briefly noted by the newspapers and Vichy radio.

Nonetheless, there was a large turnout for the funeral, held at St Alexander Nevsky Russian-Orthodox Cathedral in Paris, where his body was placed in the crypt. He was later reburied next to his mother in the Russian Orthodox chapel at Contrexéville, Vosges.

== In popular culture ==
Grand Duke Boris was well known before the war as an international playboy, and appears in many memoirs and novels of the period. A representative mention is found in Arthur Train’s 1911 transatlantic liner thriller C.Q., or, In the Wireless House. A military man is seeking aid from an international adventuress in catching a criminal attempting to flee London to New York:

"My dear Mrs. Trevelyan," said he reprovingly, "I didn't mean to suggest that this criminal might be your friend, — I only said you might know him. That's an entirely different matter, isn't it? You might know Jack Johnson, the prize-fighter, or Nan Patterson, or Oscar Wilde — "

"What a delightful circle of acquaintances!" laughed Lily, amused in spite of herself. "If you'd only throw in Harry Thaw, Tod Sloan, Abe Hummel, and Grand Duke Boris it would be really chic, — a real salon!”

== Ancestry ==
Ancestors of Grand Duke Boris Vladimirovich of Russia

16. Paul I of Russia
8. Nicholas I of Russia
17. Duchess Sophie Dorothea of Württemburg
4. Alexander II of Russia
18. Frederick William III of Prussia
9. Princess Charlotte of Prussia
19. Duchess Louise of Mecklenburg-Strelitz
2. Grand Duke Vladimir Alexandrovich of Russia
20. Louis I, Grand Duke of Hesse and by Rhine
10. Louis II, Grand Duke of Hesse and by Rhine
21. Landgravine Louise of Hesse-Darmstadt
5. Princess Marie of Hesse and by Rhine
22. Charles Louis, Hereditary Prince of Baden
11. Princess Wilhelmine of Baden
23. Landgravine Amalie of Hesse-Darmstadt
1. Grand Duke Boris Vladimirovich of Russia
24. Frederick Louis, Hereditary Grand Duke of Mecklenburg-Schwerin
12. Paul Frederick, Grand Duke of Mecklenburg-Schwerin
25. Grand Duchess Elena Pavlovna of Russia
6. Frederick Francis II, Grand Duke of Mecklenburg-Schwerin
26. Frederick William III of Prussia
13. Princess Alexandrine of Prussia
27. Duchess Louise of Mecklenburg-Strelitz
3. Duchess Marie of Mecklenburg-Schwerin
28. Prince Heinrich XLIV Reuss of Köstritz
14. Prince Heinrich LXIII Reuss of Köstritz
29. Baroness Wilhelmine of Geuder Genannt Rabensteiner
7. Princess Augusta Reuss of Köstritz
30. Count Heinrich of Stolberg-Wernigerode
15. Countess Eleonore of Stolberg-Wernigerode
31. Princess Jenny of Schönburg-Waldenburg
