= Duchess Marie of Mecklenburg-Schwerin =

Grand Duchess of Russia from 1874 to 1920

Duchess Marie
- Grand Duchess Maria Pavlovna of Russia
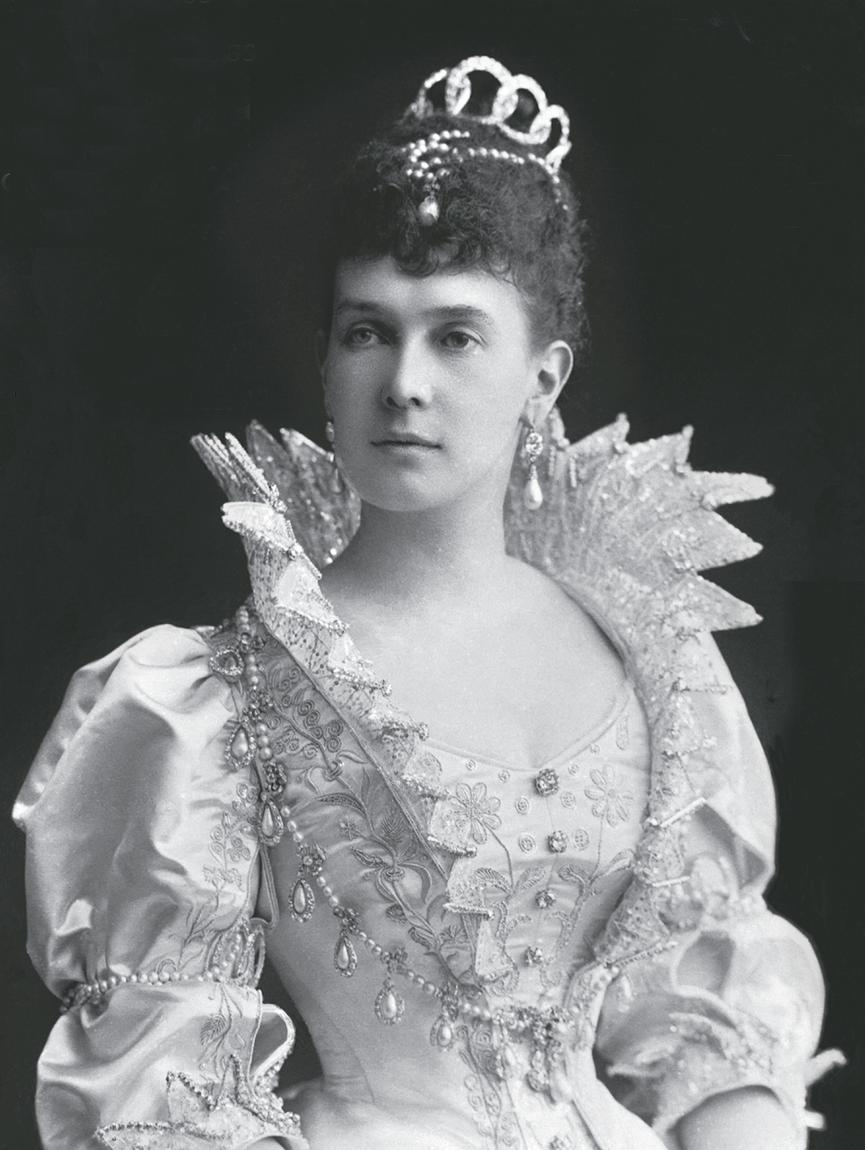
- Born: 14 May 1854; Ludwigslust Palace, Mecklenburg-Schwerin, German Confederation
- Died: 6 September 1920 (aged 66); Hôtel de la Souveraine, Contrexéville, France
- Burial: Chapel of St. Vladimir and St. Mary Magdalene, Contrexéville
- Spouse: Grand Duke Vladimir Alexandrovich of Russia (m. 1874; died 1909)
- Issue: Grand Duke Alexander Vladimirovich; Kirill Vladimirovich, Grand Duke of Russia; Grand Duke Boris Vladimirovich; Grand Duke Andrei Vladimirovich; Grand Duchess Elena Vladimirovna
Names
- Marie Alexandrine Elisabeth Eleonore
- House: Mecklenburg-Schwerin
- Father: Frederick Francis II, Grand Duke of Mecklenburg-Schwerin
- Mother: Princess Augusta Reuss of Köstritz

Grand Duchess Maria Pavlovna of Russia (Russian: Мари́я Павловна, romanized: Mariya Pavlovna; born Duchess Marie of Mecklenberg-Schwerin; 14 May [O.S. 2 May] 1854 – 6 September 1920) was the eldest daughter of Grand Duke Friedrich Franz II of Mecklenburg-Schwerin and his first wife, Princess Augusta Reuss of Köstritz. A prominent hostess in Saint Petersburg following her marriage in 1874 to the Grand Duke Vladimir Alexandrovich of Russia, she was known by many as the "grandest of the grand duchesses".

== Appearance and personality ==
Marie was noted for her attractiveness and sense of style. When Prince Arthur, Duke of Connaught and Strathearn visited Germany in search of brides, Queen Victoria noted that Marie was "said to be very pretty." When they first met, her future husband Grand Duke Vladimir Alexandrovich of Russia admired her "wonderfully expressive eyes." At her wedding, Thomas W. Knox observed that "Vladimir's bride is good-looking, solid, well-formed, with plump and finely rounded shoulders; a neck neither long nor short; regularly formed features, with the exception of the nose, which has a slight tendency to pugginess." At the coronation of her brother-in-law Alexander III, her niece, Marie of Edinburgh, noted that "she is not thin enough for classical lines but she wears her clothes better than any other woman present; her shoulders are superb and as white as cream; there is a smartness about her that no one else can attain." In 1910, the popular British novelist and author Elinor Glyn wrote that Marie was "a most stately, magnificent looking princess."

Marie was famous for her wittiness and sociability. Meriel Buchanan attended one of Marie's dinner parties at Vladimir Palace, and she wrote that Marie "know[s] exactly what to say to each individual person, an inimitable gift which royalties do not always possess, but which she had at her command in the fullest sense." When she visited Sofia, Bulgaria, she impressed A.A. Mossolov, head of the court Chancellery, with her wit and vivacity. He wrote: "For three hours, the Grand Duchess was the centre of the animated and brilliant conversation. She was talking to persons whom she had never before met; and she did not make a single mistake." Glyn reflected that Marie "had a very highly cultivated and far-seeing mind, with a delightful sense of humour, and was adored by everyone."

Marie was interested in literature. In late 1909, she invited Glyn to come to Russia to write a Russian-based story. She told Glyn: "Everyone always writes books about our peasants. Come and write one about how real people live." Glyn produced a piece of fiction called His Hour, which she dedicated to Marie, saying "her kind appreciation of the finished work is a source of the deepest gratification to me." Glyn modeled one of the characters, Princess Ardacheff, after Marie.

Like her husband, Marie loved the arts. After her husband's death, Marie succeeded him as president of the Academy of Fine Arts.

Marie was addicted to gambling. The painter Henry Jones Thaddeus attended one of Marie's parties, where she insisted that her guests play roulette. When she and her husband traveled abroad, she liked to frequent the casinos of Monte Carlo. During Nicholas II's reign, she defied a prohibition on the playing of roulette and baccarat in private homes, and she was temporarily banned from Court.

== Early life ==
Marie Alexandrine Elisabeth Eleonore was born a duchess of the Grand Ducal House of Mecklenburg to Frederick Francis II, Grand Duke of Mecklenburg-Schwerin – the then-Grand Duke of Mecklenburg-Schwerin and his first wife, Princess Augusta Reuss of Köstritz (1822–1862) – in the Schloss Ludwigslust. She was eight years old when her mother died in 1862. Her father married twice more. She studied singing with Gustav Graben-Hoffmann..In her family, she was called Miechen.

== Marriage ==
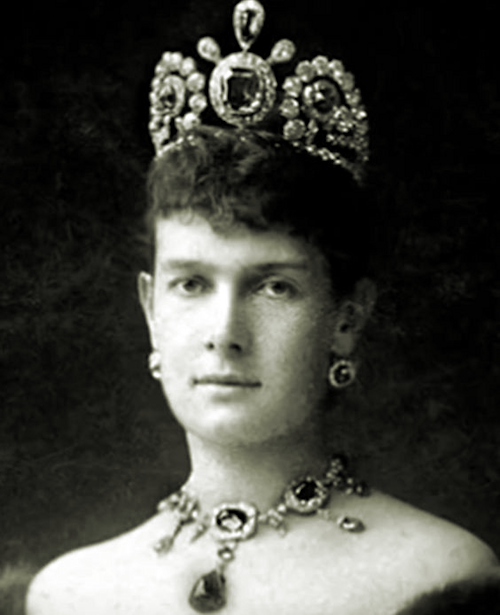
Marie wearing her original sapphire tiara with the 137 carat centre stone

Marie married Grand Duke Vladimir Alexandrovich of Russia, the third son of Alexander II of Russia. She was one of the very few royals with a Slavic patriline, who ever married a male dynast of the House of Romanov. Previously, she had been engaged to George Albert I, Prince of Schwarzburg-Rudolstadt, but broke it off as soon as she met Vladimir.

Marie and Vladimir married on 28 August 1874. The wedding took place in the chapel of the Winter Palace. It was not as lavish as the wedding of Vladimir's sister Grand Duchess Maria Alexandrovna of Russia to the Duke of Edinburgh. Lord Augustus Loftus noted, "Every thing went off very well; although the marriage was not so resplendent as that of the Duke of Edinburgh. At this season of the year this town is a desert and therefore only those came who were obliged to come."

As the Russian emperor's daughter-in-law, Marie took on a new style Her Imperial Highness.

Marie and Vladimir had four sons and one daughter.

Upon her marriage she took the Russian name of Maria Pavlovna. She was Emperor Paul I of Russia's great-great-granddaughter, and she wished to emphasize her exalted ancestry with the patronymic "Pavlovna."

== Religion ==
For three years, Marie and Vladimir could not marry, because Marie refused to convert from Lutheranism to the Russian Orthodox Church. Vladimir's mother, Empress Maria Alexandrovna was disappointed by Marie's refusal to convert: She herself had converted from Lutheranism to Russian Orthodoxy, and she thought that the Russian Orthodox church was "quite good enough for any daughter-in-law of hers." She told Vladimir that she hoped that Marie would "become Russian in body and soul," indicating her hope that Marie would convert.

Emperor Alexander II finally agreed to let Vladimir marry Marie without insisting on her conversion to Orthodoxy. Every bride of a Russian grand duke needed to convert to Russian Orthodoxy before Marie, so Marie's decision was shocking and unprecedented. Lord Augustus Loftus noted: "It is a matter of surprise here for a Foreign Princess married to a grand duke to retain her own religion but it is a process to which they will have to accustom themselves or they will find no wives for the Russian grand dukes. I think it is a healthy practice and it will do them good." In a letter to Hamilton Fish, Eugene Schuyler wrote: "The Grand Duchess will retain the Lutheran religion. This is worthy of note, as hitherto the Russian laws have required the wives of all grand dukes to adopt the orthodox Russian faith."

Marie set the precedent for brides who did not have to convert to Russian Orthodoxy to marry Russian grand dukes. At the time of Marie's marriage, Alice, Grand Duchess of Hesse and by Rhine wrote to her mother, Queen Victoria, "My mother-in-law tells me that since Miechen has been allowed to retain her religion, this right will of course be conceded to all Princesses in the future." Many years later, Alice's daughter Princess Elisabeth of Hesse and by Rhine would use Marie's precedent to retain her Lutheran faith and marry Marie's brother-in-law, Grand Duke Sergei Alexandrovich of Russia.

Marie was furious when her sister-in-law Grand Duchess Elizabeth Feodorovna of Russia converted to Russian Orthodoxy after her marriage. Grand Duchess Elizabeth predicted Marie's response, and she asked her father Louis IV, Grand Duke of Hesse and by Rhine: "Please do not yet tell anybody at Darmstadt until I write again when Miechen [Marie] knows."

In 1908, Marie converted to Orthodoxy. The decision was unexpected because she had been Lutheran for 35 years. Meriel Buchanan, daughter of a British ambassador to Russia, defended Marie's conversion as sincere: "For some time past the Grand Duchess had turned more and more to the colour and ceremonial of the Russian Church. She had prayed to the Virgin for the safety of her son [Kirill] when he was injured [during the Russo-Japanese War], and seeing in his escape from death an answer to these prayers, she finally adopted the Orthodox religion." However, some believed that the ambitious Marie acted to improve the chances of her own sons ascending the throne. After Emperor Nicholas II's sickly son Tsesarevich Alexei and unmarried, childless brother Grand Duke Michael Alexandrovich of Russia, Marie's husband and her sons were in line for the throne. In 1916, Vladimir Purishkevich wrote in his diary: "I shall never forget the story of Ivan Grigorevich Scheglovitov, former Minister of Justice. He said that one day Grand Duke Boris Vladimirovich asked him whether the descendants of the Vladimir line have any legal rights to the throne and if not, why not? Scheglovitov... told him that the Grand Dukes had no rights whatsoever because their mother continued in the Lutheran faith even after marriage. Boris left him but came back sometime later with a paper showing that the Grand Duchess had given up her Protestant religion and had embraced the Orthodox."

== Life in Russia ==
Marie lived at the Vladimir Palace situated on the Palace Embankment on the Neva River.

Marie was famous for being one of the best hostesses in the capital. During the reign of her nephew Emperor Nicholas II, her Grand Ducal court was the most cosmopolitan and popular one in the capital. The painter Henry Jones Thaddeus recalled that she was the "ideal hostess" and that "Her Imperial Highness was the life and soul of the company, the most brilliant contributor to the general discussion." Meriel Buchanan attended Marie's dinner party at Vladimir Palace, and she wrote, "Here one always met only the prettiest and smartest women, the most distinguished men, the most entertaining members of the diplomatic body."

During Alexander II's reign, Marie survived the Winter Palace explosion of February 1880. Revolutionaries had planted 125 pounds of dynamite in the dining room, and the Imperial family narrowly avoided death only because Alexander II had unusually gone to dinner late. She told painter Henry Jones Thaddeus about her experience. She explained that she was late for dinner because one of her children was ill. At the palace, Alexander II delayed going to the dining room to ask about her child. She recalled that, "At this moment the most awful explosion rents the air. The dining-room vanished from our view, and we were plunged into impenetrable darkness. A poisonous gas filled the room, suffocating us, as well as adding to our horror." She reflected that "It really seemed as if the hand of Providence had delayed the Czar’s arrival; otherwise we should have shared the same fate [as the dining room]."

Marie was close to her father-in-law, Alexander II. She recalled that he was "devoted to her" and "kindness itself." However, she incurred his anger by refusing to accept his second wife, Catherine Dolgorukov. She privately criticized Alexander II for his obsession with Catherine: "The creature... seems to have him bound as in a spell, to make him deaf and blind." She resented him for forcing his family to accept Catherine, and she expressed her anger in a letter to the late Empress Maria's brother, Louis III, Grand Duke of Hesse and by Rhine: "The Tsar has commanded us as his subjects to be friendly with this wife; if not he would force us to it. You can imagine the internal conflict that agitates us all, and the perpetual struggle between feelings, duty, and external pressure."

Marie had a distant relationship with her sister-in-law, Maria Feodorovna. Maria Feodorovna disliked Marie because of her German origins. Marie openly declared that her husband would make a better emperor than Maria Feodorovna's husband, Alexander III of Russia. After the Borki train disaster in which Alexander III, Maria Feodorovna, and their children narrowly escaped death, Marie allegedly said, "We shall never have such a chance again."

Marie had an antagonistic relationship with Nicholas II and Empress Alexandra, because of her ambitions for her own sons. On 14 June 1897, the Boston Daily Globe reported that she had "consulted a gypsy fortune teller, who had predicted that one of her sons would sit on the throne of Russia." At this time, Empress Alexandra had given birth to her second daughter Grand Duchess Tatiana. As girls were ineligible for the imperial throne, Emperor Nicholas' heirs were his two unmarried, childless brothers and his uncle Vladimir, Marie's husband. In 1912, Emperor Nicholas's only living brother Grand Duke Michael married a commoner, which led Emperor Nicholas to strip him of his military command, imperial honors, and right as the heir presumptive to serve as regent for Tsesarevich Alexei should Emperor Nicholas die prematurely. According to the laws of the succession, Marie's oldest son Kirill, the heir presumptive now that Grand Duke Michael was ineligible and his own father, Vladimir, was dead, would become regent should the emperor die before Alexei turned 21. However, Emperor Nicholas overruled the existing law and nominated his oldest daughter Grand Duchess Olga as regent with his wife Empress Alexandra as guardian during Alexei's minority. Marie was furious, but Emperor Nicholas refused to change his mind. In 1916, Marie approached Empress Alexandra about a potential marriage between Grand Duchess Olga and her second son Grand Duke Boris Vladimirovich. Empress Alexandra refused Marie's proposal, claiming that she could not let "a pure, fresh girl, 18 years his junior" marry a "well used, half worn out, blasé young man." Marie was outraged by Empress Alexandra's abrupt refusal.

In 1909, Marie's husband died. She was devastated by his death and wore mourning clothes for the rest of her life.

During World War I, Marie whole-heartedly supported Russia. Born a German princess, she was troubled by the outbreak of WW I but decided that she was now a Russian. She reflected: "Neither in my heart nor my mind have I found anything which is not utterly devoted to my Russian fatherland... it is my forty years’ residence in Russia— all the happiness I have known here, all the dreams that have come to me, all the affection and kindness I have received— which has given me a wholly Russian soul." She hated German emperor Wilhelm II and denounced him in the strongest terms: "I am only a Mecklenburger on one point: in my hatred for the Emperor William. He represents what I have been taught from my childhood to detest the most—the tyranny of the Hohenzollerns. Yes, it is the Hohenzollerns who have perverted, demoralized, degraded and humiliated Germany and gradually destroyed in her all elements of idealism and generosity, refinement and charity." The French ambassador Maurice Paléologue was impressed by Marie's "long diatribe which made me feel all the sentiments of inveterate hatred, of mute and tenacious detestation which the small and once independent states of Germany have for the despotic house of Prussia."

Marie supervised many projects for the Russian army. She oversaw hospital trains for the troops. Albert Stopford admired Marie's efficiency and skill in organizing, claiming that Marie "spar[ed] herself no trouble" and was "quite thorough." She developed a charity to give complete outfits and money to disabled Russian soldiers who were sent home. Granted permission from Emperor Nicholas, she ran the charity with state money and money from her personal wealth.

Like many other Romanovs, Marie feared that Empress Alexandra would "be the sole ruler of Russia" after Nicholas took supreme command of the Russian armies on 23 August 1915 (O.S.), hoping this would lift morale. It was widely speculated that along with her sons, she contemplated a coup against the Emperor in the winter of 1916–1917, that would force the emperor's abdication and replacement by his son Tsesarevich Alexei, and her son, Grand Duke Kirill or Grand Duke Nicholas Nikolaevich, as regent. There is no documentary evidence to support this, though the Duma president Mikhail Rodzianko famously reported that she said that the Empress must be "annihilated".

== Escape from Russia ==
Marie was the last of the Romanovs to escape Revolutionary Russia and the first to die in exile. She remained in the war-torn Caucasus with her two younger sons throughout 1917 and 1918, still hoping to make her eldest son Kirill Vladimirovich the new emperor. As the Bolsheviks approached, the group finally escaped aboard a fishing boat to Anapa in 1918. Maria spent fourteen months in Anapa, refusing to join her son Boris in leaving Russia. When opportunities for escape via Constantinople presented themselves she refused to leave for fear she would be subjected to the indignity of delousing. She finally agreed to leave when the general of the White Army warned her that his side was losing the civil war. Maria, her son Andrei, Andrei's mistress Mathilde Kschessinska, and Andrei and Mathilde's son Vladimir, boarded an Italian ship headed to Venice on 13 February 1920.

Grand Duchess Olga Alexandrovna of Russia encountered Maria at the port of Novorossiysk in early 1920: "Disregarding peril and hardship, she stubbornly kept to all the trimmings of bygone splendour and glory. And somehow she carried it off... When even generals found themselves lucky to find a horse cart and an old nag to bring them to safety, Aunt Miechen made a long journey in her own train. It was battered all right--but it was hers. For the first time in my life I found it a pleasure to kiss her..."

She made her way from Venice to Switzerland and then to France, where her health failed. Staying at her villa (now the Hotel La Souveraine), she died on 6 September 1920, aged 66, surrounded by her family at Contrexéville.

== Jewels ==
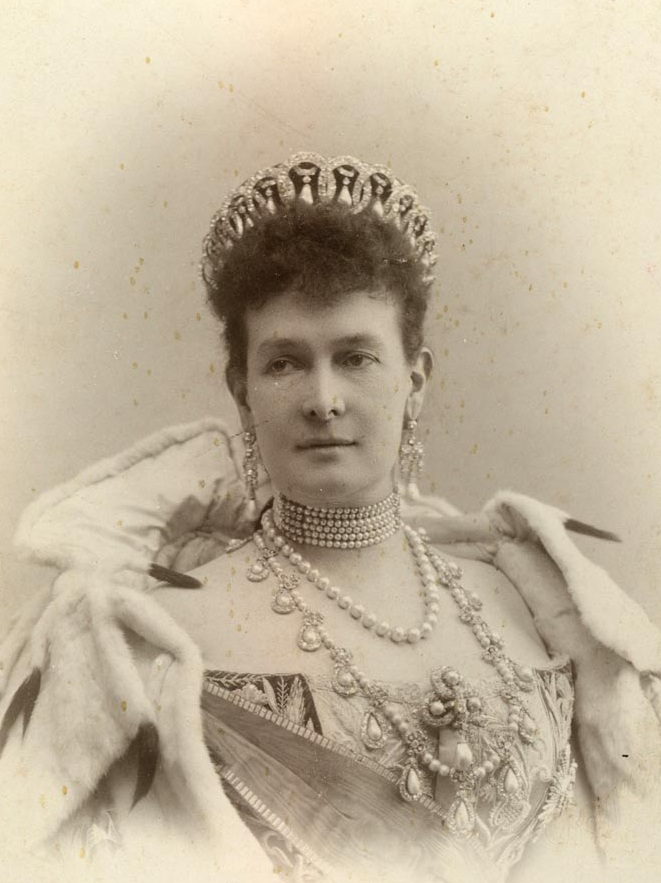
Grand Duchess Maria Pavlovna in middle age, wearing the Vladimir Tiara

Marie had a passion for jewels, and her collection was renowned. It included a 100 carat emerald once owned by her great-great-great-grandmother, Empress Catherine the Great and the 5 carat ruby of Josephine de Beauharnais. In 1899, she and Vladimir received a number of jewels for their silver wedding anniversary. Nicholas II of Russia and Alexandra Feodorovna (Alix of Hesse) gave them "an aigrette and diadem composed of magnificent diamonds." It was reported that "the three stones of the aigrette alone are worth a fortune." Each grand duke and grand duchess gave them a golden plate, which formed a collection of 36 plates, "the most magnificent service that can be imagined." Marie was a major client of Cartier, and she bought many jewels from them. These jewels included an aigrette tiara with "three curving aigrette bundles, set with Indian-cut briolettes like cascades of blossom" that "evoked the illusion of dewdrops shaken from a stem" whenever they were moved, a ruby tiara, a kokoshnik tiara with a 137-carat sapphire in the center, and a large stomacher with a 162-carat sapphire.

Following the Revolution, a family friend Albert Stopford rescued the jewels from her Palace safe and smuggled them out of Russia. After the Duchess's death, they were sold by her children to support their lives in exile. Queen Mary, Queen Consort of the United Kingdom purchased a Bolin tiara of diamond loops with pearl drops, later worn by Queen Elizabeth II, although the original gold frame has been replaced by Garrard with one of platinum; Her niece by marriage, Queen Marie, Queen Consort of Romania purchased a sapphire kokoshnik-style tiara by Cartier and Nancy Leeds (later Princess Christopher of Greece), the ruby parure. Some of her emeralds were purchased by Barbara Hutton. It had been rumored that some of the stones in Elizabeth Taylor's Bulgari Emerald necklace were from the Vladimir collection but this has been disproved by jeweler historian Vincent Meylan.

In 2008 a collection of cufflinks, cigarette cases and other small jewellery items belonging to the Vladimir family were discovered in the archives of the Swedish foreign ministry, having presumably been deposited at the Swedish Embassy in Saint Petersburg following the Revolution. They were sold on behalf of the Vladimir heirs; some of the proceeds were used to restore the Grand Duchess's tomb in Contrexéville.

== Children ==
- Grand Duke Alexander Vladimirovich of Russia (31 August 1875 – 16 March 1877).
- Grand Duke Cyril Vladimirovich of Russia (12 October 1876 – 12 October 1938), married Princess Victoria Melita of Saxe-Coburg and Gotha. They had three children.
- Grand Duke Boris Vladimirovich of Russia (24 November 1877 – 9 November 1943), married Zinaida Rashevskaya.
- Grand Duke Andrei Vladimirovich of Russia (14 May 1879 – 30 October 1956), married the Prima ballerina Mathilde Kschessinskaya. They had one son.
- Grand Duchess Elena Vladimirovna of Russia (29 January 1882 – 13 March 1957); married Prince Nicholas of Greece and Denmark. They had three daughters.

Marie's eldest surviving son, Grand Duke Cyril Vladimirovich, married, in 1905, his first cousin Victoria Melita of Saxe-Coburg and Gotha, daughter of Vladimir's sister, the Duchess of Edinburgh and of Saxe-Coburg and Gotha. Other than the fact that first cousin marriages were not allowed, she was also the former wife of Ernst Louis, Grand Duke of Hesse, the brother of the Empress. This marriage was not approved by Nicholas II and Cyril was stripped of his imperial titles. The treatment of her son created strife between her husband and the Emperor. However, after several deaths in the family put Cyril third in the line of succession to the Imperial Throne, Nicholas agreed to reinstate Cyril's Imperial titles, and the latter's wife was acknowledged as HIH Grand Duchess Viktoria Fedorovna.

Marie was a doting grandmother. At least once a year, her daughter Elena would bring her daughters to visit. Marie's favorite was Princess Marina of Greece and Denmark. Meriel Buchanan heard Marie say "Marina is the cleverest one," "Marina has the sweetest nature," and "Marina is the most affectionate." Marie gave her granddaughters "dresses, dolls, prams, bicycles, a pony and carriage and jewellery suitable for their ages, such as silver muff-chains, watches, strings of pearls and diamonds and turquoise pendants". She despised Kate Fox, the nurse to Elena's daughters. When Kate spanked her granddaughters, she was furious and complained that "that dreadful woman knocks them about." During the First Balkan War, Elena sent her daughters to Paris to stay with Marie. Marie took her granddaughters out for drives in the Bois de Boulogne, showed them off to her French friends, took them to see puppet shows, and gave them numerous "toys, presents, and chic new dresses".

== Honours ==
- Mecklenburg-Schwerin: Dame's Decoration of the House Order of the Wendish Crown, in Diamonds
- Russian Empire: Dame Grand Cross of the Order of Saint Catherine
- Kingdom of Prussia: Dame of the Order of Louise, 1st Division
- Kingdom of Bavaria: Dame of the Order of Theresa
- Spain: Dame of the Order of Queen Maria Luisa, 30 September 1891
- (Austrian Empire) (Kingdom of Hungary) Austria-Hungary: Grand Cross of the Order of Elizabeth, 1907

== Ancestry ==
Ancestors of Duchess Marie of Mecklenburg-Schwerin

8. Frederick Louis, Hereditary Grand Duke of Mecklenburg-Schwerin
4. Paul Frederick, Grand Duke of Mecklenburg-Schwerin
9. Grand Duchess Elena Pavlovna of Russia
2. Frederick Francis II, Grand Duke of Mecklenburg-Schwerin
10. Frederick William III of Prussia
5. Princess Alexandrine of Prussia
11. Duchess Louise of Mecklenburg-Strelitz
1. Duchess Marie of Mecklenburg-Schwerin
12. Heinrich XLIV, Prince Reuss of Köstritz
6. Heinrich LXIII, Prince Reuss of Köstritz
13. Baroness Wilhelmine von Geuder genannt Rabensteiner
3. Princess Augusta Reuss of Köstritz
14. Count Heinrich of Stolberg-Wernigerode
7. Countess Eleonore of Stolberg-Wernigerode
15. Princess Johanna of Schönburg-Waldenburg

== Sources ==
- Julia P. Gelardi, From Splendor to Revolution; The Romanov Women 1847-1928, St. Martin's Griffin, 2011, ISBN 978-1250001610
- Robert K. Massie, Nicholas and Alexandra, Dell Publishing Co., 1967, ISBN 0-440-16358-7
- John Curtis Perry and Constantine Pleshakov, The Flight of the Romanovs, Basic Books, 1999, ISBN 0-465-02462-9
