= Gustav Graben-Hoffmann =

German composer, singer and music educator

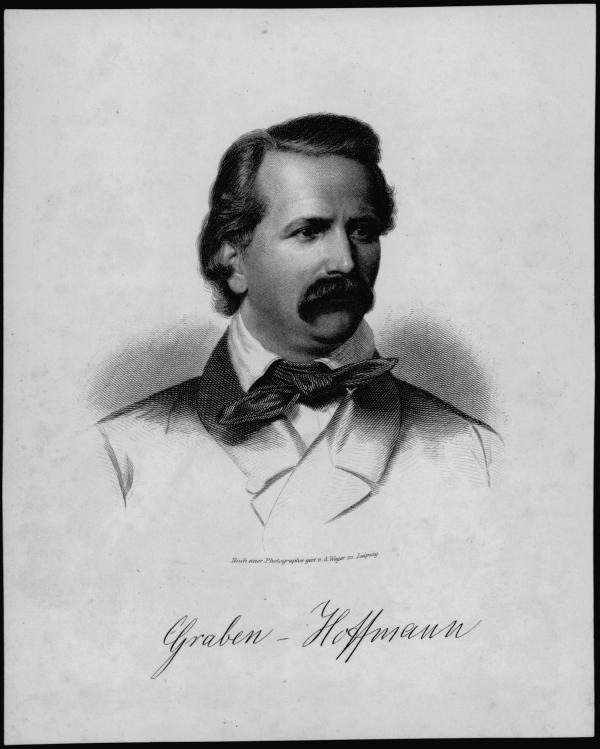

Gustav Graben-Hoffmann (March 7, 1820, Bnin, Kórnik – May 20, 1900, Potsdam) was a German composer, singer, and music educator. He is best known for authoring two influential works on vocal pedagogy: Das Studium des Gesangs nach seinen musikalischen Elementen (Leipzig, 1872) and Praktische Methode als Grundlage für den Kunstgesang und eine allgemeine musikalische Bildung (Dresden, 1874). His best known composition was the ballad 500,000 Teufel.

== Life ==
Gustav Heinrich Graben-Hoffmann was born on March 7, 1820, in Bnin, Kórnik. He began his musical training under his father and with other teachers in the city of Posen. In his early career he taught in various locations in Eastern Germany

Graben-Hoffmann relocated to Berlin where he trained as a vocalist and composer and had a career as a concert singer from 1844 to 1848. Illness ended his singing career, and in 1850 he established a music academy for women, Musikakademie fur Damen, in Potsdam. He left this school to complete his education in music composition at the Leipzig Conservatory (now the University of Music and Theatre Leipzig) under Moritz Hauptmann where he graduated in 1857. He worked as a voice teacher in Dresden from 1858 to 1868. After this he relocated to Berlin where in 1870 he established a vocal music school for women. He returned to Dresden in 1873 where he resumed teaching. One of his vocal students was Duchess Marie of Mecklenburg-Schwerin. He returned to Potsdam in 1885 and spent the last years of his life in financial difficulty. He died in 1900 at the age of 80.

== Compositions ==
As a composer, Graben-Hoffmann's output included lieder, vocal duets, and choral music. His music successful work was the ballad 500,000 Teufel. A collection of his personal papers are held in the Berlin State Library.

== Vocal pedagogy ==
Graben-Hoffmann is best known for his contributions to vocal pedagogy; publishing three works on the topic: Die Pflege der Singstimme und die Gründe von der Zerstörung und dem frühzeitigen Verlust derselben (Dresden, 1865), Das Studium des Gesangs nach seinen musikalischen Elementen (Leipzig, 1872), and Praktische Methode als Grundlage für den Kunstgesang und eine allgemeine musikalische Bildung (Dresden, 1874). Of these the latter two were particularly influential and were adopted by many voice teachers of his era. His vocal pedagogy included an original method for teaching rhythm to singers. He also advocated for educating singers with the fundamentals of music theory, and cautioned against straining the voice through the use of virtuosic music (i.e. coloratura).
