= Grand Duke Andrei Vladimirovich of Russia =

Russian imperial Grand Duke (1879–1956)

Grand Duke Andrei Vladimirovich
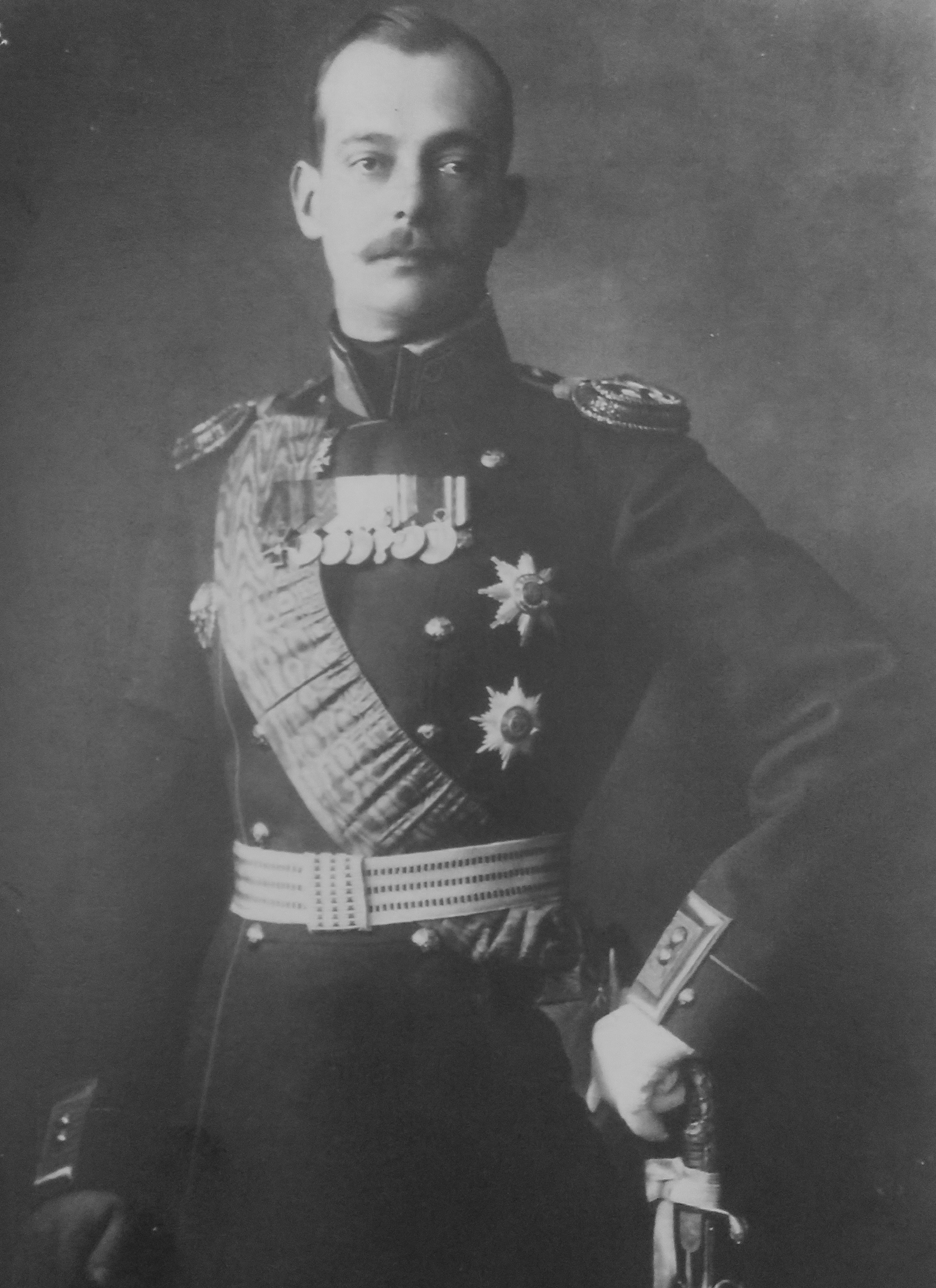
- Andrei in 1907
- Born: 14 May 1879; Tsarskoye Selo, Saint Petersburg Governorate, Russian Empire
- Died: 30 October 1956 (aged 77); Paris, France
- Burial: Sainte-Geneviève-des-Bois Russian Cemetery
- Spouse: Mathilde Kschessinska (m. 1921)
- Issue: Prince Vladimir Romanovsky-Krasinsky
- House: Holstein-Gottorp-Romanov
- Father: Grand Duke Vladimir Alexandrovich
- Mother: Marie of Mecklenburg-Schwerin

Grand Duke Andrei Vladimirovich of Russia (Russian: Андре́й Влади́мирович; 14 May [O.S. 2 May] 1879 – 30 October 1956) was the youngest son of Grand Duke Vladimir Alexandrovich of Russia, and thus a grandson of Emperor Alexander II and the first cousin of Nicholas II, the last Russian emperor.

In 1900, he began an affair with the famous ballerina Mathilde Kschessinska, becoming the third grand duke to fall for her.

Grand Duke Andrei followed a military career and graduated from the Alexandrovskaya Military Law academy in Saint Petersburg in 1905. He occupied different military positions during the reign (1894-1917) of Emperor Nicholas II, but with no particular distinction. He became a senator in 1911 and was appointed to the rank of Major General in the Imperial Russian Army in 1915. He took part in World War I, but was away from real combat, spending most of the conflict at Russia's General Staff headquarters or in idle time in ceremonial positions in Saint Petersburg.

In February 1917, shortly before the fall of the Russian monarchy, Grand Duke Andrei left Saint Petersburg to join his mother in Kislovodsk in the northern Caucasus. He remained in the Caucasus for the next three years. After the October Revolution of November 1917, he was briefly arrested along with his brother, Grand Duke Boris, but they escaped. He departed revolutionary Russia in March 1920, being the last grand duke to leave for exile. In 1921, he married his longtime mistress, Mathilde Kschessinska (1872-1971), and recognized her son Vladimir (or "Vova") as his own. The couple lived in the South of France until 1929, when they moved permanently to Paris, where Kschessinska opened a ballet school. After World War II, Grand Duke Andrei lived in reduced circumstances. At his death at age 77, he was the last surviving Russian grand duke born in Imperial Russia.

== Early life ==
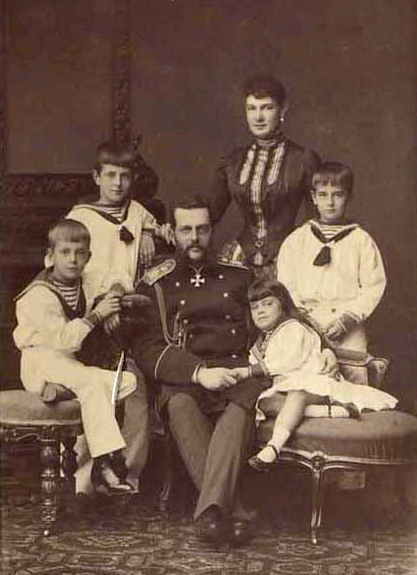
From left to right: Grand Duke Andrei, Grand Duke Kirill, Grand Duke Vladimir Alexandrovich, Grand Duchess Maria Pavlovna, Grand Duchess Elena and Grand Duke Boris.

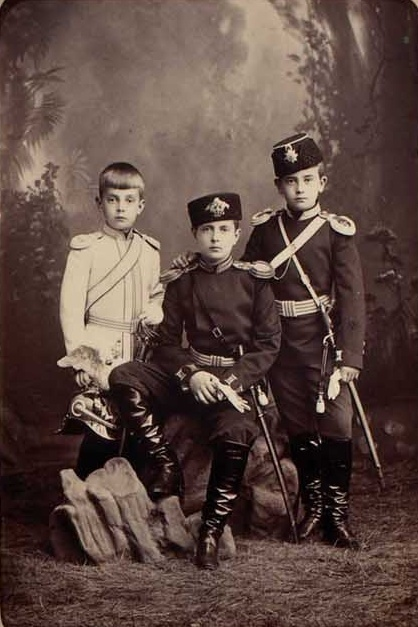
Grand Duke Andrei (in the white uniform) with his brothers Kirill and Boris Vladimirovich.

Grand Duke Andrei Vladimirovich of Russia was born on 14 May [O.S. 2 May] 1879 in Tsarskoye Selo, at his parents country residence, the Vladimir Villa. He was the youngest of the four Vladimirovich sons; a sister followed him a few years later, and the eldest of his brothers died in early childhood. His father, Grand Duke Vladimir Alexandrovich, a brother of Tsar Alexander III of Russia, was a renowned patron of the arts. Andrei's mother, Grand Duchess, Maria Pavlovna, née a Duchess of Mecklenburg-Schwerin, was one of the greatest hostesses of Russian society. Both parents doted on their four surviving children: Andrei, his two eldest brothers, Kirill and Boris, and their younger sister, Grand Duchess Elena. The children were educated at home.

Raised by British nannies, English was Andrei's first language. He also learned Russian, French and German. His father, who loved art, assigned Léon Bakst as a drawing master for the children. Grand Duke Andrei grew up in opulence. The family's main residence was the Vladimir Palace in Saint Petersburg, but as his father preferred country life, they spent the greater part of the year at the Vladimir Villa, a mansion in Tsarskoye Selo, returning to Saint Petersburg during the winter. The children also accompanied their parents in many of their travels abroad to France, Germany and Italy, staying in Coburg, Paris, Berlin and Schwerin.

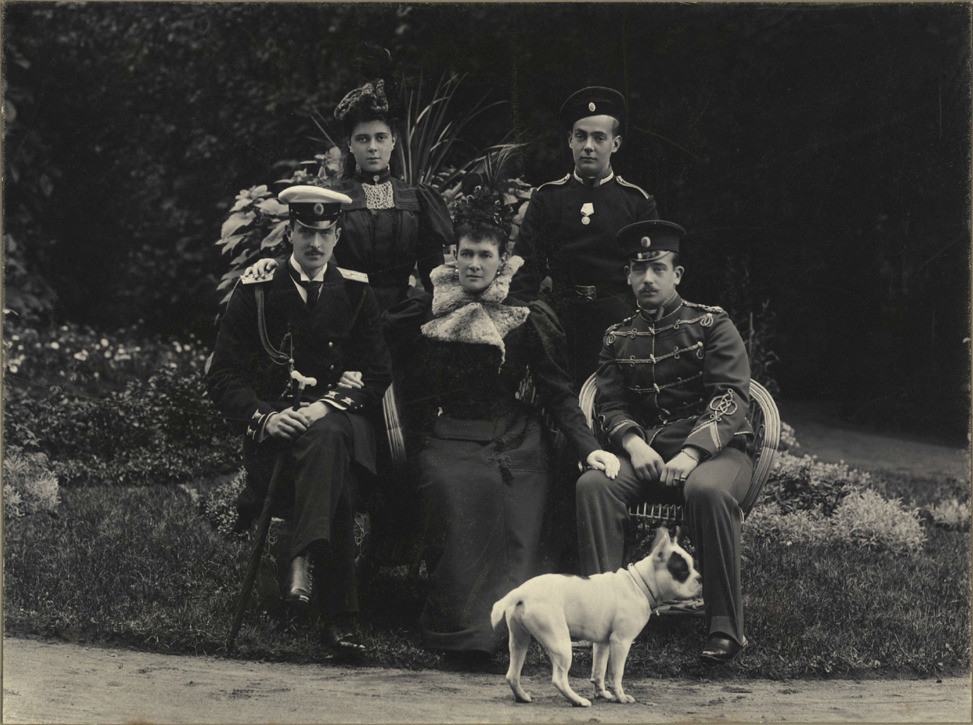
Sitting: Grand Duke Kirill, Grand Duchess Maria Pavlovna and Grand Duke Boris. Standing in the back: Grand Duchess Yelena and Grand Duke Andrei

Following Romanov tradition, Andrei was destined to follow a military career. While his eldest brother, Kirill, chose the Imperial navy, Andrei and his brother Boris joined the infantry. Andrei began his military service in August 1898 as lieutenant in the Guards Horse-Artillery Brigade. In 1899 he was appointed adjutant, graduating in 1902 from the Mikhailovsky Artillery School. He then studied law at the Alexandrovskaya Military Law Academy at Potseluev bridge, graduating with honors in 1905. He was subsequently listed by the military-judicial department. The military law Academy tasked him with translating foreign military criminal statutes. He was appointed lieutenant in 1902, captain in 1906 and colonel on 18 April 1910. In March 1911, he was appointed senator. From 1911 to 26 February 1914, he commanded the Life Guards 2nd Don Cossack artillery. In spite of his appointments, Grand Duke Andrei did not have much interest in his military career. Instead, he pursued a life of leisure enjoying the privileges provided by his royal status and wealth.

== Relationship with Kschessinska ==
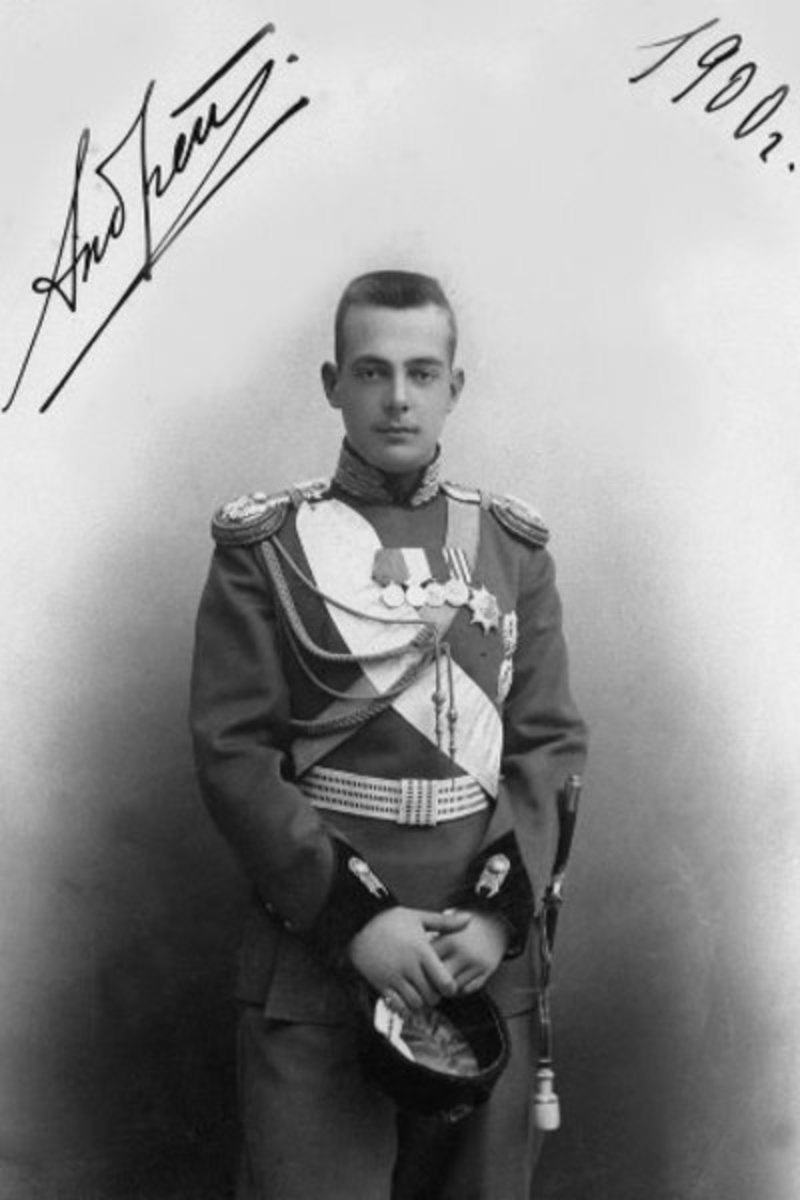
Grand Duke Andrei in 1900, the year he met Mathilde Kschessinska.

Grand Duke Andrei was tall, shy and good looking. Efforts to make him settle down with a bride of royal blood were unsuccessful. He was very close to his mother, particularly after the death of his father in 1909, and manipulated her to his advantage, which his siblings resented. His pliable personality made him more popular within the Romanov family than his siblings. He was a good friend of his cousin Grand Duke Michael Alexandrovich, who was a year older.

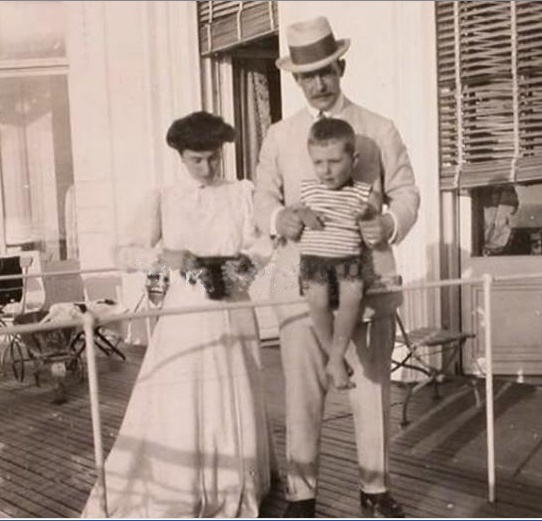
Mathilde Kschessinska and Grand Duke Andrei Vladimirovich holding her son. Ostend, Belgium c. 1908.

In February 1900, Grand Duke Andrei was invited by his brothers, Grand Dukes Kirill and Boris, to a dinner party at the house of Mathilde Kschessinska. Kschessinska, the Prima Ballerina Assoluta of the Mariinsky Theatre, was the eldest among the three most prominent dancers of her generation at the Imperial Russian Ballet, along with Anna Pavlova and Tamara Karsavina. Grand Duke Andrei sat next to his hostess during the dinner, but accidentally spilt a glass of red wine on her. Mathilde, attracted to the young grand duke, seven years her junior, took the incident as good omen. Age 28, Mathilde had been the mistress of Tsar Nicholas II when he was heir to the throne. Their two-year relationship ended with Nicholas' engagement to his future wife, Alexandra. Mathilde was ambitious and eager to maintain her close relationship with the Romanovs. She subsequently began a long time affair with Grand Duke Sergei Mikhailovich of Russia, Nicholas and Andrei's first cousin once removed. As she was not in love with Sergei, but enjoyed his company and protection, Mathilde pursued a relationship with Grand Duke Andrei, the third Romanov to become involved with her. By July 1900, they became lovers, traveling together that summer to Biarritz and Paris. In the autumn 1901, they visited several Italian cities, including Venice, Padua, Florence and Rome. Grand Duke Sergei tolerated their affair, remaining a close and loyal friend to the famous ballerina, but the relationship between the two grand dukes grew tense. They tried to avoid each other and maintain civility while sharing the same woman for almost two decades.

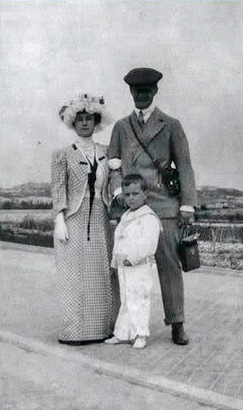
Mathilde and Grand Duke Andrei Vladimirovich with their son.

The relationship between the three complicated further as Mathilde became pregnant. The baby was conceived around mid-September 1901, before her trip to Italy. On 18 June 1902, Mathilde gave birth to a son. Both grand dukes were at first convinced they were the child's father. After the Revolution, Kschessinska and Grand Duke Andrei maintained that Andrei was the father. The child, who became known within the family by his nickname, Vova, received the name and patronymic Vladimir Sergeievich. No surname was made public until 1911. The birth certificate showed Sergei as the father. Grand Duke Sergei was devoted to the child, looking after mother and son until his exile and subsequent execution following the fall of the Russian monarchy. The question of Vladimir's paternity remains unresolved. However, most sources attribute the paternity to Grand Duke Andrei Vladimirovich, whom the child resembled.

== A Russian Grand Duke ==
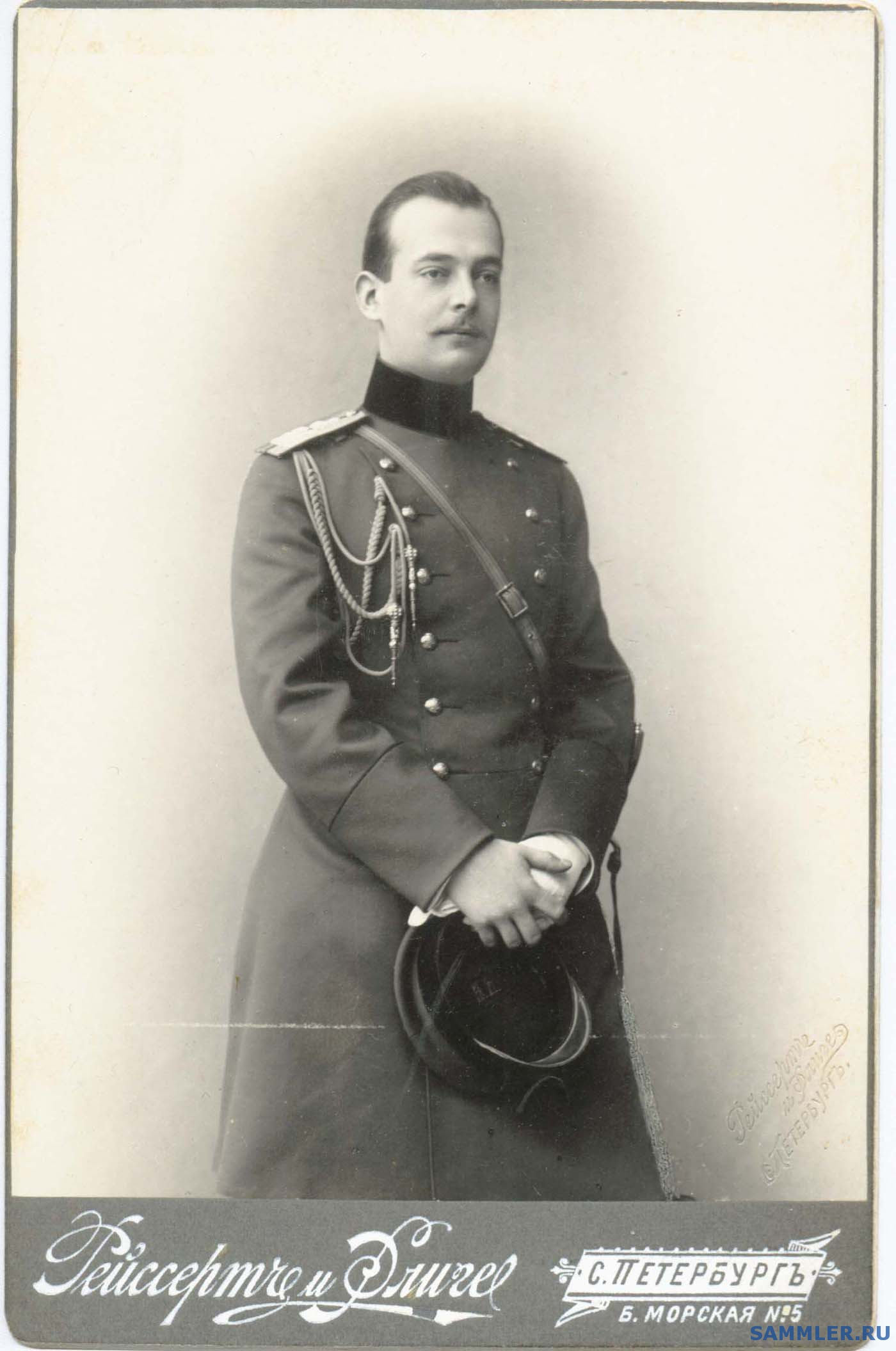
Grand Duke Andrei in his youth

In 1903, Grand Duke Andrei purchased his own palace. The building, located at 28 English embankment, previously belonged to Baron Pavel von Derviz, a Russian railway magnate of noble German descent. After the Baron's death, his son inherited the mansion, and in 1889, enlisted the architect Alexander Krasovsky (1848–1918), who would work for Nicholas II in the Winter Palace, to remodel it in the Florentine style. As upkeep of the mansion was expensive, it was sold to Grand Duke Andrei for 400 thousand rubles. Grand Duke Andrei seldom lived there. He made few significant changes, even leaving the Von Derviz coats of arms and monograms in place. However, he had some of the rooms redecorated. He used the building to entertain, offering concerts, plays and dinners, and as a gathering place for artists, particularly from the ballet world . The palace has survived to the present. Since 1959, it houses a registry office for weddings.

Grand Duke Andrei could neither openly live together with Mathilda nor did there exist the possibility of contracting a morganatic marriage with her. Only in their trips to Western Europe did they enjoy enough freedom to live as a couple, but even abroad they were forced to maintain appearances. The couple always had to travel with his Aide-de-camp, Feodor Von Kube, and when Grand Duke Andrei was invited to events, Mathilda could not join him.

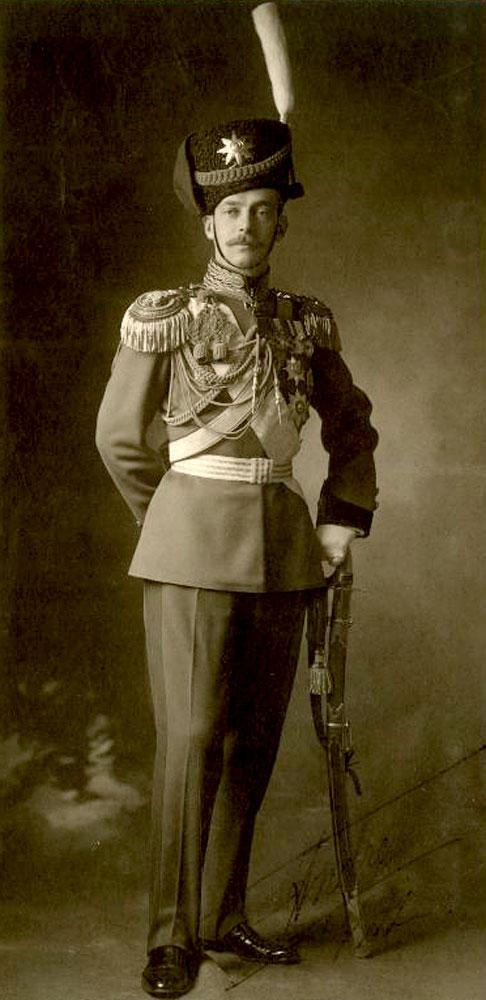
Grand Duke Andrei Vladimirovich of Russia

As a member of the Russian Imperial family, Grand Duke Andrei took some duties of representation. He was an honorary member of the Russian Imperial Fire prevention society and chairman of the committee for the construction of a memorial to Emperor Alexander II in St. Petersburg. In 1907, he went to Bulgaria on an official visit with his father. In 1911, he visited Ferdinand I of Bulgaria for a second time as a representative of Russia, and he was appointed senator in that year.

In the summer of 1912, Grand Duke Andrei fell ill with bronchitis. Fearing the onset of tuberculosis, he was sent to recuperate in the Crimea, staying in a palace owned by his cousin Grand Duke Nikolai Nikolayevich. His convalesce was long and he went to Saint-Maurice, Switzerland and to the South of France to recuperate. He liked the French Riviera in particular and in the spring of 1913, he bought a property for Mathilde in Cap-d'Ail. The villa, located on the edge of a mountain looking the sea, was named Alam, Mathilde's nickname, Mala, spelled backwards. Upon his return to Russia, Andrei Vladimirovich took part in the 300th anniversary celebrations of the Romanov dynasty. Villa Alam was completely remodeled and Andrei and Mathilde returned there in the spring of 1914, hoping to stay there every spring. However, they were able to return only six years later, after the war, having survived the Russian revolution.

== War and revolution ==
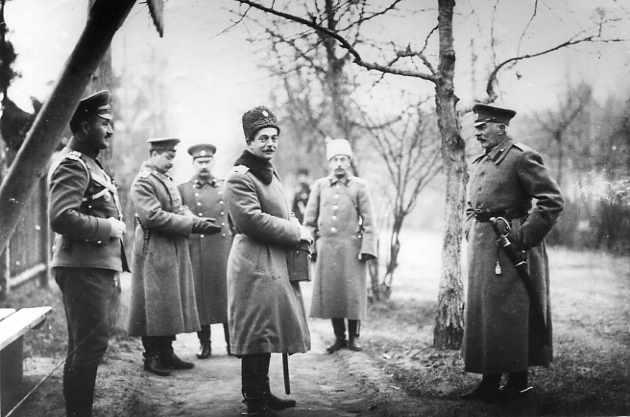
Grand Duke Andrei during the war with a group of officers at Stavka, in Baranovichi 1914–1915. The high command of the armed forces was later moved to Mogilev on 8 August 1915 due to German occupation.

With the outbreak of World War I, Grand Duke Andrei joined the staff at the headquarters of the Northwestern front fighting against Germany. It was a relatively safe position away from combat. On 7 May 1915, he became Commander of the Horse Guard Artillery brigade. This meant little, as the batteries were scattered in many places and were not a united command. He was made Major-General on 15 August 1915 and served as chief of the 130th Infantry Regiment of Kherson. His military duties were ill-defined and he was able to spend much idle time in Saint Petersburg retaking his social life with Kschessinska. Empress Alexandra took notice, complaining to Nicholas II.

By 1916, Grand Duke Andrei joined other members of his family in political intrigues against the Empress who was in charge of the government in Saint Petersburg while Nicholas II was away at Russia's war military headquarters. In December 1916, the Assassination of Rasputin, in which Grand Duke Dmitri Pavlovich and Prince Felix Yusupov took part, divided the Romanov family further. Grand Duke Andrei joined many of his relatives in asking for clemency for the culprits. As Andrei's ambitious mother intrigued against Empress Alexandra, Nicholas II ordered the Grand Duchess to leave Saint Petersburg for a time. After a short personal interview with Nicholas II, on 16 January 1917, Grand Duke Andrei left for Kislovodsk, a spa resort town in the Caucasus. He arrived there on January 21. His mother followed him a month later, claiming health reasons. Andrei Vladimirovich and his mother were in Kislovodsk when Nicholas II was forced to abdicate at the outbreak of the February Revolution.

The diaries of Grand Duke Andrei, written while he was in the army in the North-Eastern Front (1914–1915) and in Petrograd (1916–1917), have survived at the State Archives of the Russian Federation. They have been published, giving a detailed description of the period between the murder of Rasputin and the abdication of Nicholas II.

In July 1917, Mathilde and her son escaped the disturbance in Saint Petersburg, joining Andrei in Kislovodsk. However, they could not live together as Grand Duchess Maria Pavlovna was reluctant to acknowledge their presence. Andrei found separate living arrangements for them while he settled in a different villa with his brother Grand Duke Boris, who arrived in September. During the period of the provisional government Grand Duke Andrei, his brother and mother lived mostly undisturbed in Kislovodsk, protected by local Cossacks. In the summer of 1918, the Bolsheviks tightened their grip on members of the former Imperial family. They ordered the assassination of those imprisoned, including Tsar Nicholas II and his immediate family. Seventeen of the 52 Romanovs living in Russia were executed during the red terror.

== Escaping the Bolsheviks ==
The Bolsheviks arrested Grand Duke Andrei and his brother Boris on the night of 7 August 1918, after a systematic search of their villa. They were taken to Pyatigorsk with other prisoners and detained at the state hotel in that city. Commissar Leshchinsky, the Bolshevik commander sent to execute them, had once been a struggling artist in Paris before the war whom Boris had assisted by purchasing some of his paintings. Leshchinsky recognized him and saved the two brothers from the firing squad. Risking his own life, he returned them to their villa the next day. Likely to be rearrested, the two grand dukes escaped to the surrounding mountains with Andrei's aide-de-camp, Colonel Von Kube, on 26 August 1918. They lived in hiding for almost five weeks, moving from village to village under protection of the Kabarda tribes, sheltered by Colonel Andrei Shkuro and his band of loyal Cossacks. Kislovodsk was captured by the White Army and the Bolsheviks fled in late September, allowing the two brothers to return to the city. On the evening of 23 September, Grand Duke Andrei, his brother Boris and Colonel Von Kube returned to the city on horseback, accompanied by Kabardian nobles who had protected them. During their time hiding in the mountains, Andrei allowed his beard to become overgrown. He so closely resembled his first cousin, Nicholas II, that he was mistaken for the Tsar.

Under threat of the Red advance, the small group of Romanovs and their entourage were forced to flee two days later, in constant fear for their lives. The white General Viktor Pokrovsky advised them to move to Anapa, a coastal city on the Black Sea. Pokrovsky arranged a train and an escort of his own men and they left Pyatigorsk on 19 October, with their own companions and other local refugees. At Touapse, a trawler was waiting. They docked at Anapa on 4 November 1918. From there it was easy to escape abroad by boat. However, Grand Duchess Maria Pavlovna was determined to remain in Russia hoping that the White movement would prevail and Andrei's brother, Grand Duke Kirill Vladimirovich, would be installed as Tsar. It was suggested that Grand Duke Andrei should join the White army of General Anton Denikin, but the grand duchess opposed the idea, stating that members of the Romanov family should not take part in Russia's civil war.

Against his mother's wishes, Grand Duke Boris left with his future wife, Zinaida Rashevskaya, in March 1919. On 29 March, Admiral Edward Hobart Seymour, commander of the British fleet in the Black Sea, offered to take Grand Duke Andrei and his mother to Constantinople, but Grand Duchess Maria Pavlovna again flatly refused. After spending seven months in Anapa, they moved back to Kislovodsk on 7 June, as the city had been liberated by the White Army. They remained there until December 1919. By Christmas, the Red army was to retake Kislovodsk and Grand Duke Andrei, with his mother and their entourage, decided to go to Novorossiysk, on the eastern coast of the Black Sea, where General Peter Wrangel had kept the Reds away. From there it was easier to go abroad. One day before their departure from Kislovodsk, Von Kube, Andrei's faithful adjutant, died of typhus.

The group of refugees arrived in Novorossiysk on 17 January. They lived in their railway car, which was parked in the station. By February, it became obvious that the Whites had lost the civil war. General Wrangel warned them that the situation was beyond hope and they decided to leave. They departed on the Italian liner Semiramisa bound for Venice on 3 March 1920. Grand Duke Andrei and his mother were the last Romanovs to leave Russia for exile.

== Exile ==
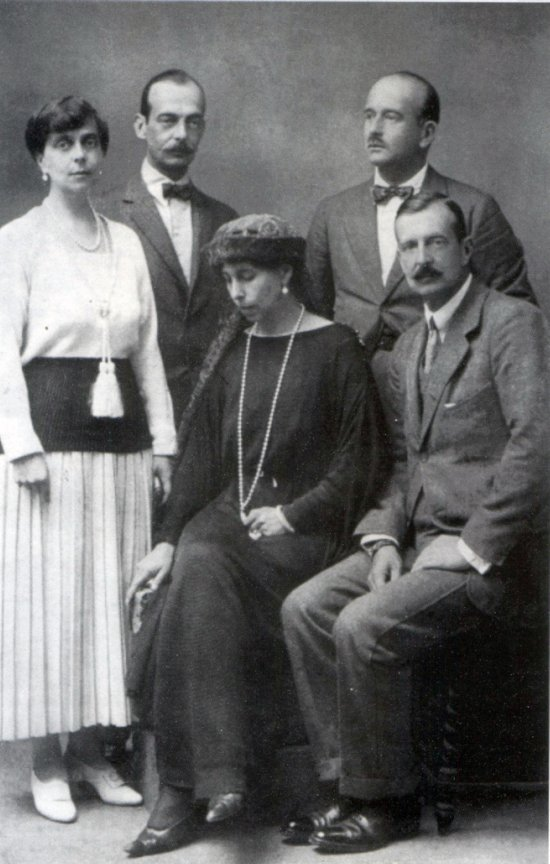
The Vladimirovich siblings in exile.

Once in Venice, Grand Duke Andrei accompanied his mother via train to Cannes, on the French Riviera. Grand Duchess Maria Pavlovna died a few months later in September 1920. During her illness in Contrexéville, Grand Duke Andrei was reunited for the first time in exile with his three siblings. At his mother's death the last obstacle for Grand Duke Andrei to marry Mathilde Kchessinska was lifted. Andrei asked permission to marry Kchessinska from his brother Grand Duke Kirill and from Empress Maria Feodorovna, widow of Tsar Alexander III, the senior members of the Romanov family; both gave their consent. Kchessinska, who was of Polish descent, was Catholic, but they were married in a simple ceremony in the Russian Orthodox Church of St. Michael Archangel in Cannes on 30 January 1921. Grand Duke Andrei also claimed paternity of Kchessinska's son, Prince Vladimir Romanovsky-Krasinsky (30 June 1902 – 23 April 1974). In 1924, Grand Duke Andrei's eldest brother, Kirill, proclaimed himself Tsar in exile. Grand Duke Andrei supported his brother's claim. Grand Duke Kirill granted to Mathilde and her son the titles of Princess and Prince Romanovsky-Krasinsky, with the treatment of Serene Highness.

During their first years in exile, Grand Duke Andrei and his wife were in better economic circumstances than many of the other Romanovs. Tsar Nicholas II made his relatives sell their properties abroad, repatriating their fortune to Russia during the war, but Grand Duke Andrei was able to keep Villa Alam in Cap-d'Ail because the property was under Mathilda's name. To have cash flow and maintain his standard of living, Andrei sold the jewel collection that he inherited from his mother, and he mortgaged Villa Alam. For the next years, they settled there, entertaining lavishly and living in style. They traveled frequently to Paris, and Grand Duke Andrei was also active in philanthropic work, raising funds for Russian refugees.

In 1928, Grand Duke Andrei became one of the few members of the Romanov family to believe the claim of Anna Anderson, the best known of several impostors who claimed to be the youngest daughter of Tsar Nicholas II, Grand Duchess Anastasia. Anderson was on the eve of her first trip to the United States when Grand Duke Andrei visited her once in January 1928. After their meeting, he said it was "an unshakable recognition … Her face is striking in its profound sadness, but when she smiles, it is she, it is Anastasia, without a doubt." Although he had not been particularly close to Nicholas II and his family, Grand Duke Andrei had met the real Anastasia in family events through the years and while in service as aide-de-camp to the Tsar. Grand Duke Kirill protested his brother's support of Anderson and discouraged his intervention in the case. In later years, Grand Duke Andrei recanted his opinion.

Grand Duke Andrei and his wife liked to gamble. Mathilde dissipated their remaining wealth, including her own valuable jewel collection, at the gambling tables of Monte Carlo—the remainder was lost in the crash of 1929. With their resources completely depleted, they sold their house in Cap-d'Ail on 4 February 1929, moving the next day to Paris. There they settled in the Villa Molitor in the 16th arrondissement of Paris. To provide for the family, Kschessinska opened a ballet school in 1929 in a studio close to their house. Her students included some of the greatest classical ballet dancers of all time: Margot Fonteyn, Alicia Markova, André Eglevsky, Tatiana Riabouchinska and Tamara Toumanova.

== Last years ==
Grand Duke Andrei Vladimirovich between his wife Mathilde Kschessinska and his cousin Grand Duchess Maria Pavlovna of Russia. Paris. 1953

During the 1930s, Mathilde's ballet school prospered, allowing Grand Duke Andrei and his family to have a comfortable, yet modest life. He helped with the financial part of running the school, but continued to be afflicted by ill health due to his weak lungs. Although uninterested in politics, he continued to actively support a number of organization; he headed the Guard association, the Russian Historical and Genealogical Society in Paris and he was an honorary chairman of the union of Izmaylovsky Regiment. Andrei Vladimirovich also kept in touch with his Romanov relatives, particularly his brothers and many of his cousins, such as Grand Duke Dmitri Pavlovich, Grand Duchess Maria Pavlovna, Jr. and Prince Gabriel Constantinovich. His relationship with his sister, Grand Duchess Elena Vladimirovna of Russia, became strained as she never truly accepted Mathilde as a member of the family.

At the outbreak of World War II, under the threat of a German bombing of Paris, Grand Duke Andrei and his family moved to Le Vésinet. They returned after three months. Following the German invasion of France, they fled by train to Grand Duke Boris's Villa in Biarritz. On 26 June, the Germans reached Biarritz and after three months the two couples decided to return to Paris. As their only source of income was the ballet school, they had to keep it opened during the war years in spite of difficulties and decreased attendance. Prince Vladimir Romanovsky-Krasinsky (who took a Westernized version of his mother's Polish name, Krzesińska, hyphenated with the adjective version of his father's name) was spoiled by his parents and never had an independent life. Because he had been a member of the "pro-Soviet " Union of Young Russians in the 1930s, he was regarded as Soviet sympathizer by the Nazi Party. Vladimir was arrested by the Gestapo and held in a camp for Russian emigrants in Compiègne. Grand Duke Andrei visited German Police Headquarters multiple times and asked for help from Russian émigrés to get his son released, but neither group would help him. Vladimir was finally freed after 119 days in detention. During the war years the two other surviving grand dukes died; Grand Duke Dmitri Pavlovich in 1942 and Grand Duke Boris in 1943. With the death of his brother Boris, Andrei became the last surviving Grand Duke of the Romanov dynasty who had been born in Imperial Russia.

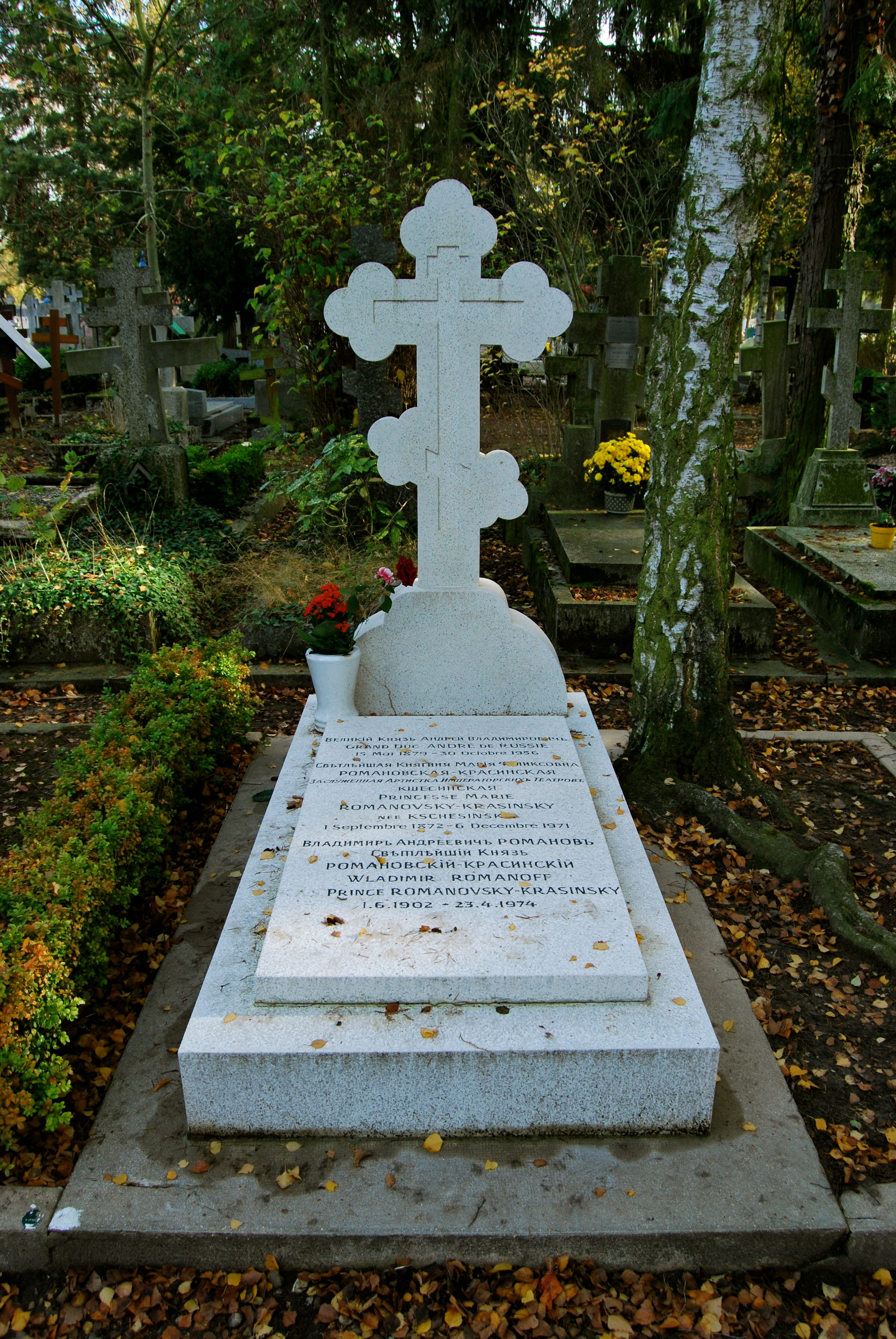
Grave of Grand Duke Andrei Vladimirovich, Mathilde Kschessinska and Vladimir Romanovsky-Krasinsky. Sainte-Geneviève-des-Bois Russian Cemetery.

Grand Duke Andrei's last years were marked by increasingly frail health and straitened financial circumstances. He was forced to sell his house, renting instead. To balance his finances, he relied partially on economic aid from his nephew, Grand Duke Vladimir Kirillovich. Some of Mathilde's friends and former pupils, such as Margot Fonteyn and Diana Gould Menuhin, also provided financial help. In 1954, Grand Duke Andrei became a godfather of Grand Duke Vladimir's only child, Grand Duchess Maria Vladimirovna of Russia, the current claimant to the headship of the Romanov family.

Despite poor health, Grand Duke Andrei lived to be 77 years old, an age reached by few in the Romanov family. He surpassed the longevity record held by his great-uncle, Grand Duke Michael Nikolaevich, by almost six months. On the morning of 31 October 1956, Grand Duke Andrei worked in his study. Having finished a letter on his typewriter, he felt dizzy, went to his bed to lie down and died suddenly. He was buried wearing the uniform of the Horse Guard Artillery Brigade, which he had commanded during World War I. Matilda Kshesinskaya died in Paris in December 1971 at age 99. Prince Vladimir Romanovsky-Krasinsky died unmarried and childless in France in 1974, three years after his mother.

== Portrayal ==
Actor Grigory Dobrygin portrayed Grand Duke Andrei Vladimirovich in Matilda, a Russian biopic from director Alexei Uchitel released in 2017.

== Ancestry ==
Ancestors of Grand Duke Andrei Vladimirovich of Russia

16. Paul I of Russia
8. Nicholas I of Russia
17. Duchess Sophie Dorothea of Württemburg
4. Alexander II of Russia
18. Frederick William III of Prussia
9. Princess Charlotte of Prussia
19. Duchess Louise of Mecklenburg-Strelitz
2. Grand Duke Vladimir Alexandrovich of Russia
20. Louis I, Grand Duke of Hesse and by Rhine
10. Louis II, Grand Duke of Hesse and by Rhine
21. Princess Louise of Hesse-Darmstadt
5. Princess Marie of Hesse and by Rhine
22. Charles Louis, Hereditary Prince of Baden
11. Princess Wilhelmine of Baden
23. Landgravine Amalie of Hesse-Darmstadt
1. Grand Duke Andrei Vladimirovich of Russia
24. Frederick Louis, Hereditary Grand Duke of Mecklenburg-Schwerin
12. Paul Frederick, Grand Duke of Mecklenburg-Schwerin
25. Grand Duchess Elena Pavlovna of Russia
6. Frederick Francis II, Grand Duke of Mecklenburg-Schwerin
26. Frederick William III of Prussia
13. Princess Alexandrine of Prussia
27. Duchess Louise of Mecklenburg-Strelitz
3. Duchess Marie of Mecklenburg-Schwerin
28. Prince Heinrich XLIV Reuss of Köstritz
14. Prince Heinrich LXIII Reuss of Köstritz
29. Baroness Wilhelmine of Geuder Genannt Rabensteiner
7. Princess Augusta Reuss of Köstritz
30. Count Heinrich of Stolberg-Wernigerode
15. Countess Eleonore of Stolberg-Wernigerode
31. Princess Jenny of Schonburg-Waldenburg

== Honours ==
National

- Knight of the Imperial Order of Saint Andrew the Apostle the First-called, 1879
- Knight of the Imperial Order of Saint Alexander Nevsky, 1879
- Knight of the Imperial Order of the White Eagle, 1879
- Knight of the Imperial Order of Saint Anna, 1st Class, 1879
- Knight of the Imperial Order of Saint Stanislaus, 1st Class, 1879
- Knight of the Imperial Order of Saint Prince Vladimir, 4th Class, 28 May 1905; 3rd Class, 1911
- Knight of the Order of Saint George, 4th Class
- Silver Commemoration Medal for the Reign of Emperor Alexander III
- Commemoration Medal for the Coronation of Emperor Nicholas II

Foreign

- Austria-Hungary: Grand Cross of the Royal Hungarian Order of Saint Stephen, 23 January 1912
- Emirate of Bukhara: Order of the Crown of Bukhara
- Kingdom of Bulgaria:
  - Knight of the Order of Saints Cyril and Methodius, 19 January 1912
  - Grand Cross of the Order of Saint Alexander
- German Empire: Knight of the Order of the Black Eagle
  - (Saxe-Coburg and Gotha) (Duchy of Saxe-Altenburg) (Saxe-Meiningen) Ernestine duchies: Grand Cross of the Saxe-Ernestine House Order
  - (Grand Duchy of Hesse) Hesse and by Rhine: Grand Cross of the Grand Ducal Hessian Order of Ludwig, 3 November 1898
  - Mecklenburg:
    - Grand Cross of the House Order of the Wendish Crown, with Crown in Ore
    - Memorial Medal for Grand Duke Friedrich Franz II, 12 January 1889
  - Oldenburg: Grand Cross of the House and Merit Order of Duke Peter Friedrich Ludwig
- Kingdom of Romania: Grand Cross of the Order of the Star of Romania
- Kingdom of Serbia: Grand Cross of the Order of Karađorđe's Star

== Bibliography ==
- Chavchavadze, David. The Grand Dukes. Atlantic, 1989, ISBN 0-938311-11-5
- Hall, Coryne. Imperial Dancer. Sutton publishing, 2005, ISBN 0-7509-3558-8
- Katin-Yartsev, M and Shumkov. A. Costume Ball at the Winter Palace. Russky Antiquariat, 2003, ISBN 5981290021
- Perry, John and Pleshakov, Constantine, The Flight of the Romanovs. Basic Books, 1999, ISBN 0-465-02462-9.
- Zeepvat, Charlotte. The Camera and the Tsars. Sutton Publishing, 2004, ISBN 0-7509-3049-7.
- Zeepvat, Charlotte, Romanov Autumn. Sutton Publishing, 2000, ISBN 0-7509-2739-9
