= Mathilde Kschessinska =

Russian ballerina (1872–1971)

- Princess Romanovskaya-Krasinskaya
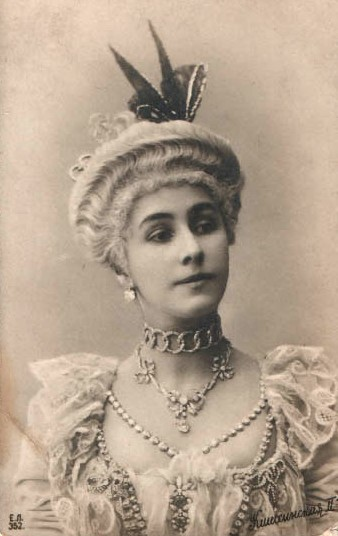
- Kschessinska costumed for the title role in Petipa's La Camargo. St. Petersburg, c. 1902
- Born: 31 August 1872; Ligovo, Petergof, Russia
- Died: 6 December 1971 (aged 99); Paris, France
- Burial: Sainte-Geneviève-des-Bois Russian Cemetery
- Spouse: Grand Duke Andrei Vladimirovich of Russia (m. 1921; died 1956)
- Issue: Prince Vladimir Romanovsky-Krasinsky
- House: Holstein-Gottorp-Romanov (by marriage)
- Father: Feliks Krzesiński
- Religion: Russian Orthodox (previously Catholic)
- Occupation: Prima ballerina

Mathilde-Marie Feliksovna Kschessinska (Note: Polish: Matylda Maria Krzesińska; Russian: Матильда Феликсовна Кшесинская, romanized: Matilda Feliksovna Kshesinskaya.) (31 August [O.S. 19 August] 1872 – 6 December 1971), also known as Princess Romanovskaya-Krasinskaya upon her marriage, was a Polish-Russian ballerina from the noble Krzesiński family. Her father, Felix Kschessinsky, and her brother and sister danced in Saint Petersburg. She was a mistress of the future Emperor Nicholas II of Russia before his marriage, and later the wife of his cousin Grand Duke Andrei Vladimirovich of Russia. She was known in the West as Mathilde Kschessinska or Matilda Kshesinskaya.

== Early life ==
Kschessinska was born at Ligovo, near Peterhof, the youngest child of Adam-Felix Kschessinsky (Polish: Adam Feliks Krzesiński) and Julie Kschessinska. Her Polish father arrived in St. Petersburg on 30 January 1853, one of five Warsaw mazurka dancers invited by the tsar, where he performed in the Mariinsky Theatre. In 1880, at the age of eight, Mathilde entered into the Imperial Theatre School, where she studied under Yekaterina Vazem, and was inspired by Virginia Zucchi. On 30 August 1881, she danced for the first time on the Grand Theatre stage in the ballet Don Quixote. Kschessinska's graduation exam dance was the pas de deux from La Fille Mal Gardée, to the music of Stella Confidenta. The performance was attended by Tsar Alexander III of Russia and the rest of the Imperial family, including the Tsesarevich, the future Tsar Nicholas II. After the performance, the tsar said "Be the glory and the adornment of our ballet." On 22 April 1890, she made her debut on stage, performing the same dance for Papkov's farewell, and graduated at the age of 18.

== Prima ballerina ==
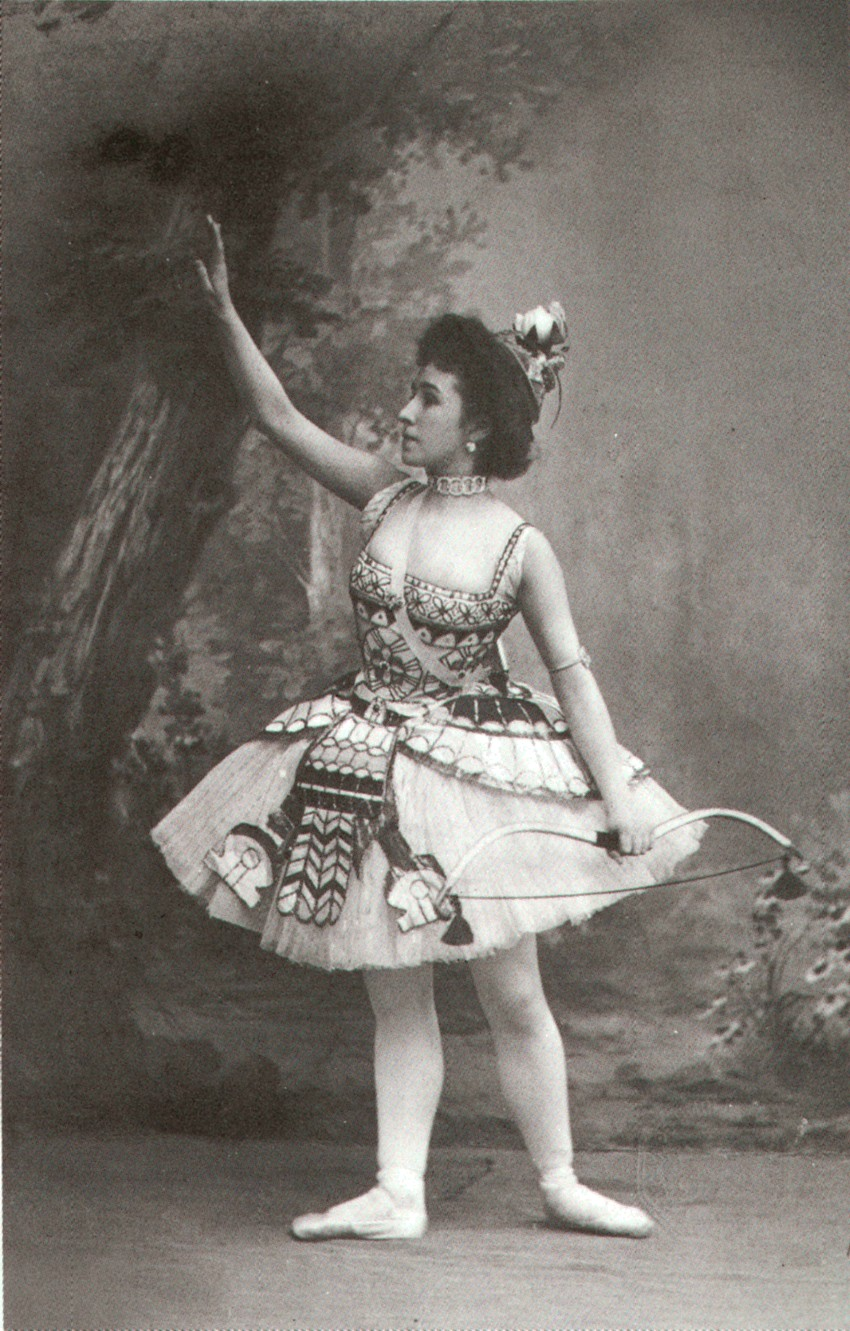
Kschessinska in 1898, in costume for The Pharaoh's Daughter

In 1896, she obtained the title of prima ballerina assoluta of the Saint Petersburg Imperial Theatres; she was the only Russian dancer to receive the title before the Russian Revolution of 1917. Despite this, Pierina Legnani continued to receive the best roles, including in Bluebeard by Marius Petipa. Later that year, she received a brooch as a gift from the imperial family.

== Relationship with Petipa ==
According to Mathilde, "My whole artistic career, until Fokine's appearance, had been linked with Petipa. The success of his ballet, La Fille du Pharaon, which was, as I have said, to become my favorite role, had at once assured him fame in Russia. where he came on 24 May 1847, invited by the Imperial Theatres Administration, after working several years in Spain." Petipa created roles for Kschessinska in Le Réveil de Flore (1894), Mlada (1896), Le Roi Candaule (1897), Les Aventures de Pélée (1897), The Pharaoh's Daughter (1898), Harlequinade (1900), and La Esmeralda (1899). She also mastered the 32 fouettés en tournant of Legnani.

In 1899, Prince Serge Wolkonsky became the director of the Imperial Theaters, succeeding Ivan Vsevolozhsky. Although he held the position only until 1902, he achieved a great deal. Sergei Diaghilev was his immediate assistant, and Wolkonsky entrusted him with the publication of the Annual of the Imperial Theaters in 1900. During this period, new names appeared in the theaters, such as painters Alexandre Benois, Konstantin Somov, and Léon Bakst. However, Wolkonsky was forced to send in his resignation after clashing with Kschessinska when she refused to wear the panniers of an 18th-century costume in the ballet La Camargo. In 1901, he was succeeded by V.A. Teliakovsky.

== Relationships with the Romanovs ==
=== The future tsar ===
Kschessinska had been involved with the future Nicholas II from 1890, when he was Tsesarevich and she was age 17, having met him in the presence of his family after her graduation performance. The relationship continued for three years, until Nicholas married the future Empress Alexandra Feodorovna in 1894, shortly after the death of his father, Alexander III. Mathilde wrote of the future tsar: "He had an incomparable knowledge of the Russian language and its subtleties, and found the greatest pleasure in reading the Russian classics. In addition to being erudite and speaking several languages perfectly he was aided in his reading by an extraordinary memory. By nature a fatalist, he had the highest conception of his mission. He considered it his duty to remain in Russia, even and especially after the Revolution, and would never leave his native land; he thus paid with his own life and the lives of his family for his faith in the Russian people."

=== Two grand dukes ===
Kschessinska engaged in a sexual relationship with two Grand Dukes of the Romanov family: Sergei Mikhailovich and his cousin Andrei Vladimirovich. In 1902, she gave birth to a son, Vladimir (known as "Vova"; 30 June 1902 – 23 April 1974); he was later titled H.S.H. Prince Romanovsky-Krasinsky, but said that he never knew for sure who his father was.

However, Kschessinska wrote that "Serge knew for certain that he was not the father of the child" and that she was "full of my love for André and my son." She goes on to state "We decided to call our son Vladimir, in honor of the Grand Duke Vladimir, André's father."

== Scandals and rumours ==
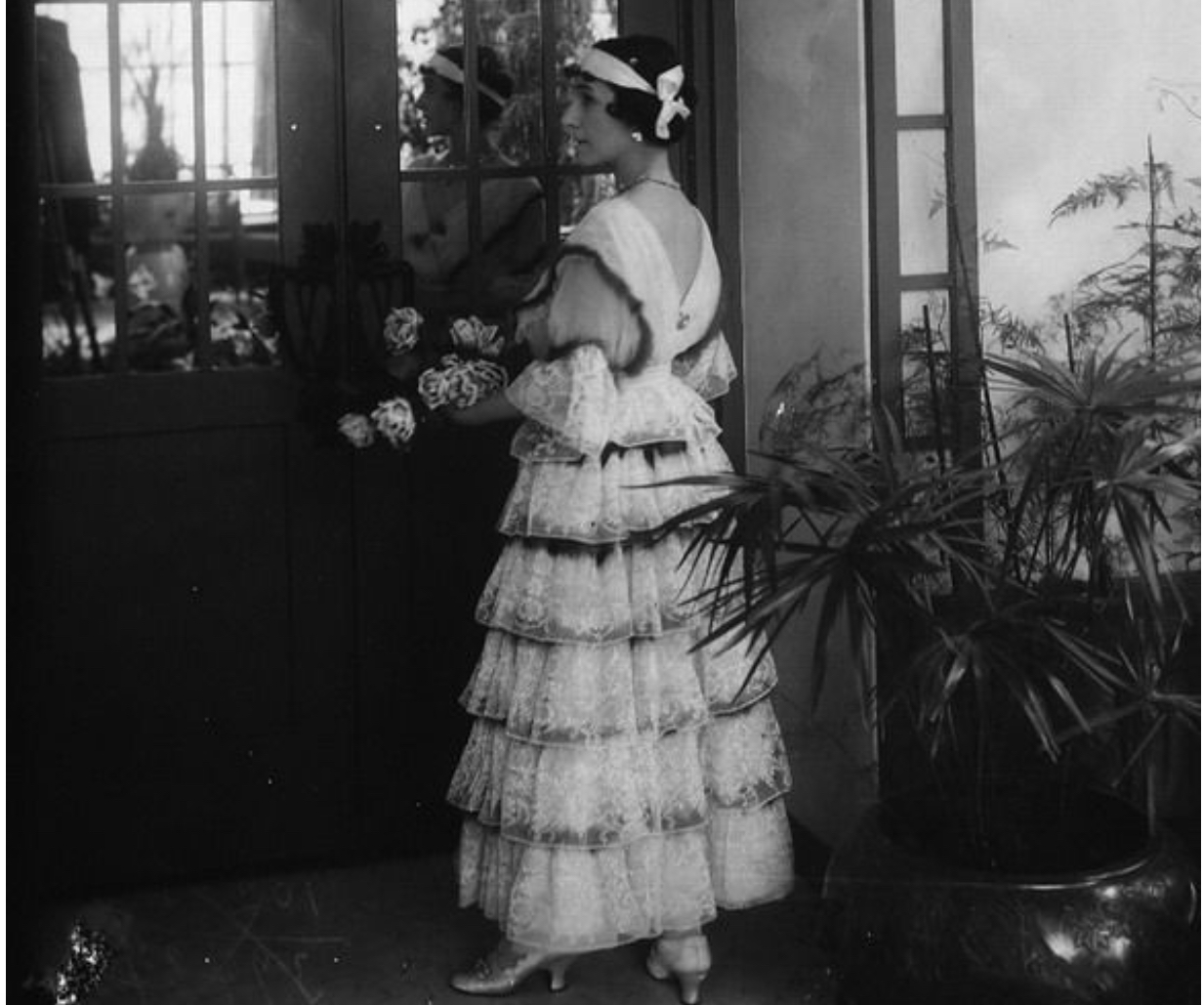
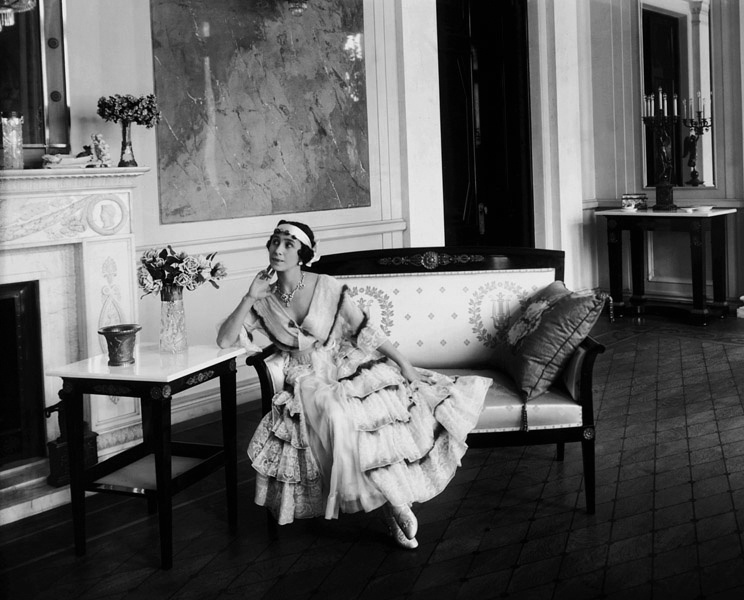
Mathilde Kschessinska in her mansion, 1916

=== Coaching of Pavlova ===
While Kschessinska could be charming and kind to colleagues, such as the young Tamara Karsavina, she was not afraid to use her connections with the tsar to strengthen her position in the Imperial Theatres. She was known to sew valuable jewels into her costumes and came on stage as the Princess Aspicia in The Pharaoh's Daughter wearing her diamond encrusted tiaras and chokers. She could be ruthless with rivals. One of her more famous miscalculations occurred when, while pregnant in 1902, she coached Anna Pavlova in the role of Nikya in La Bayadère. She considered Pavlova to be technically weak and believed that the young ballerina could not upstage her. Instead, audiences became enthralled with the frail, long-limbed, ethereal-looking Pavlova, and a star was born.

=== Chickens on stage ===
Another notorious incident occurred in 1906 when Kschessinska's coveted role of Lise in the Petipa/Ivanov production of La Fille Mal Gardée was given to Olga Preobrajenska. One feature of this production was the use of live chickens on stage. Before Preobrajenska's variation in the Pas de ruban of the first act, Kschessinska opened the doors to the chickens' coops, and at the first note of the music, the chickens went flying about the stage. Nevertheless, Preobrajenska continued her variation to the end and received a storm of applause, much to Kschessinska's chagrin.

== Finances ==
Through her aristocratic connections, she managed to amass much valuable property in the Russian capital. The Bolsheviks took over her house soon after the February Revolution. It was here that Vladimir Lenin addressed a meeting of the Petrograd Bolsheviks, shortly after he had addressed the crowd at the Finland Station when he returned in 1917. She claims in her memoirs that they turned it into a kind of pigsty; she went to court to recover it, only to receive death threats; once when she passed near the house, she saw Alexandra Kollontai in the garden wearing one of her overcoats. The Bolsheviks were forced to abandon the house only after the July Days.

== Move to France ==
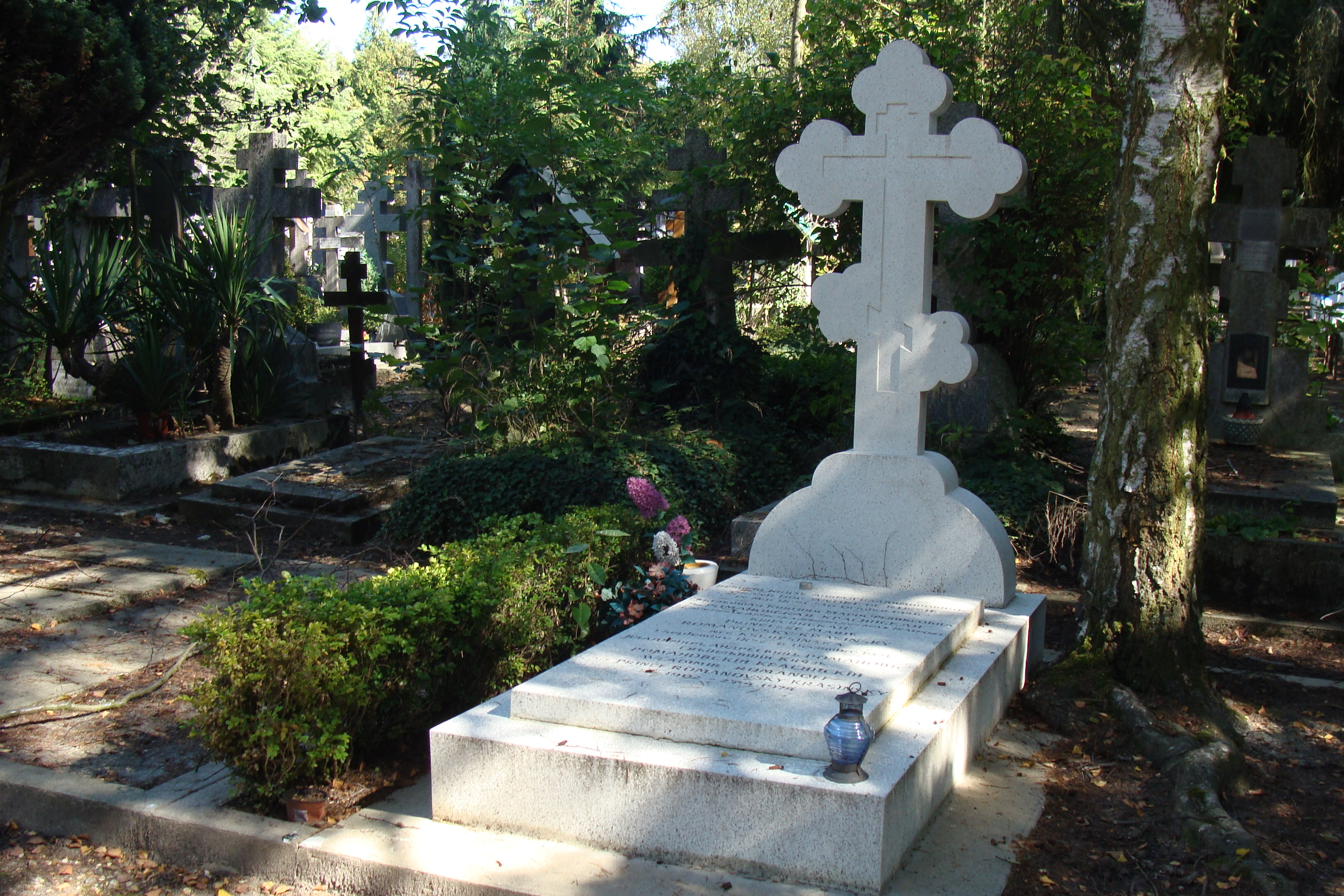
Kschessinska's tomb at the Sainte-Geneviève-des-Bois Russian Orthodox Cemetery, 2014

Kschessinska fled her home, with her son Vova, on 27 February 1917 (Old Style), during the February Revolution. Her home occupied by the Bolsheviks, Kschessinska wrote "And Petrograd was a nightmare world of arrests, the assassination of officers in the streets, arson, pillage". After staying with friends and relatives for a time, she left Petrograd on 13 July, ending up in Kislovodsk with Andrei. On 30 December 1919, the White Army no longer able to stop the Red invasion of the Caucasus, she was forced to flee to Novorossiysk. On 13 February 1920, Mathilde, Vova, and Andrei boarded a Lloyd Triestino liner, leaving behind Russian soil. On 12 March 1920, they arrived at Kschessinska's Cap-d'Ail villa.

On 30 January 1921, Andrei and Mathilde were married at the Russian Church in Cannes. According to Kschessinska, the Grand Duke Kirill Vladimirovich of Russia "bestowed on me the name of Krassinsky, with the title of Princess. Our son was similarly given the title Prince." In 1935, due to their morganatic marriage, they added the name Romanovsky, and Romanov was added to their son's.

On 9 December 1925, she converted from Catholicism to Russian Orthodoxy. On 5 February 1929, they moved into their Paris home. On 26 March, Kschessinska opened a dance studio, and gave her first lesson on 6 April. By 1933, she had over a hundred students, boys and girls. Her students included Tatiana Riabouchinska, Pearl Argyle, Andrée Howard, June Brae, Margot Fonteyn, Pamela May, Harold Turner, and Diana Gould. On 14 June 1936, she made her last appearance on stage at the age of 64, a jubilee performance at Covent Garden.

In 1960, she published an autobiography titled Souvenirs de la Kschessinska (published in English as Dancing in St. Petersburg: The Memoirs of Kschessinska). In later years, she suffered financial difficulties but remained indomitable. She died in Paris at the age of 99. She is buried at the Sainte-Genevieve-des-Bois Russian Cemetery with her husband and son.

== Cultural depictions ==
- Fall of Eagles, 13-part television drama created by John Elliot for the BBC; portrayed by Jan Francis (1974)
- Anna Pavlova, film by Emil Loteanu; portrayed by Natalya Fateyeva (1983)
- Matilda, film by Aleksey Uchitel; portrayed by Michalina Olszańska (2017)
- Untitled Matilda Kshesinskaya project, written by Paul Schrader (TBA)

== See also ==
- List of Russian ballet dancers

== Autobiography ==
- H.S.H. The Princess Romanovsky-Krassinsky. Dancing in Petersburg — London, 1960, 1973.
- S.A.S. La Princesse Romanovsky-Krassinsky Souvenirs de la Kschessinska — Paris, 1960.

== Sources ==
- Hall, Coryne (2005). Imperial Dancer: Mathilde Kschessinska and the Romanovs. Sutton. ISBN 978-0-7509-3557-9.
- Haskell, Arnold (1935). Diaghileff: his artistic and private life. OCLC 1120929567.
- Trofimova, Mariya (1992). "Кн. С. M. Волконский — Театральный критик газеты Последние новости" [Prince S. M. Volkonsky – theatrical critic of the newspaper Posledniye Novosti]. Revue des Études Slaves (in Russian). 64 (4): 735–772.
- Pavlischeva, Natalya (2018). Анна Павлова. "Неумирающий лебедь" [Anna Pavlova. The Immortal Swan] (in Russian). Yauza. ISBN 978-5-9500752-8-5.
