= Camargo (ballet) =

1872 ballet by Marius Petipa

Camargo (or La Camargo) is a grand ballet in three acts and nine scenes, with choreography by Marius Petipa and music by Ludwig Minkus. The libretto by Jules-Henri Vernoy de Saint-Georges and Marius Petipa is based on an incident in the life of the 18th-century dancer Marie Camargo, in which she and her sister Madeleine were abducted by the Comte de Melun in May 1728 and taken to his mansion.

The ballet was first presented by the Imperial Ballet on December 7/19 (Julian/Gregorian calendar dates), 1872 at the Imperial Bolshoi Kamenny Theatre in St. Petersburg, Russia. The Principal Dancers were Adèle Grantzow (as Marie Camargo), Alexandra Virginia (as Madeleine Camargo), Lev Ivanov (as Vestris, the Maître de Ballet) and Timofei Stukolkin (as the Comte de Melun).

== Revivals ==
Camargo was revived by Petipa's second ballet master Lev Ivanov for the Imperial Ballet, especially for the farewell benefit performance in honour of the Imperial Ballet's prima ballerina assoluta Pierina Legnani, who left for her native Italy shortly thereafter. It was first presented at the Imperial Mariinsky Theatre on January 17–30, 1901, in St. Petersburg, Russia, with Legnani (as Marie Camargo), Olga Preobrajenskaya (as Madeleine Camargo), Pavel Gerdt (as Vestris, the Maître de Ballet) and Georgii Kiaksht (as the Comte de Melun).

== See also ==
- List of historical ballet characters
