= Princess Elisabeth of Hesse and by Rhine (1895–1903) =

German princess

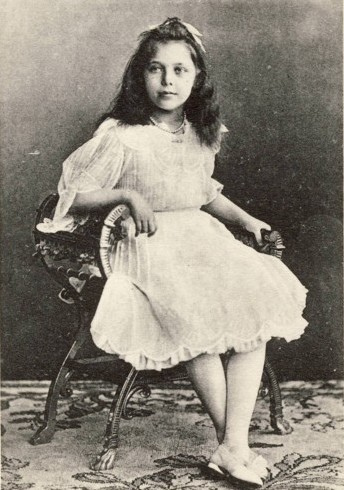
- Princess Elisabeth in 1903
- Born: 11 March 1895; New Palace, Darmstadt, Grand Duchy of Hesse, German Empire
- Died: 16 November 1903 (aged 8); Skierniewice, Congress Poland, Russian Empire
- Burial: Rosenhöhe, Darmstadt, Grand Duchy of Hesse, German Empire
Names
- Elisabeth Marie Alice Viktoria
- House: Hesse-Darmstadt
- Father: Ernest Louis, Grand Duke of Hesse and by Rhine
- Mother: Princess Victoria Melita of Saxe-Coburg and Gotha

Princess Elisabeth of Hesse and by Rhine (Elisabeth Marie Alice Viktoria; 11 March 1895 – 16 November 1903) was a German Hessian and Rhenish child princess, the only daughter of Ernest Louis, Grand Duke of Hesse and by Rhine, and his first wife, Princess Victoria Melita of Saxe-Coburg and Gotha. She was named after her paternal great-grandmother, Princess Elisabeth of Prussia. Her paternal aunt had the same name, and both the young princess and her aunt were nicknamed Ella.

Elisabeth’s early death was rumored to be a result of poison meant for her uncle Emperor Nicholas II, but the court physician said she died of virulent typhoid fever, probably caused by her taking a drink of water from a contaminated stream.

== Birth ==
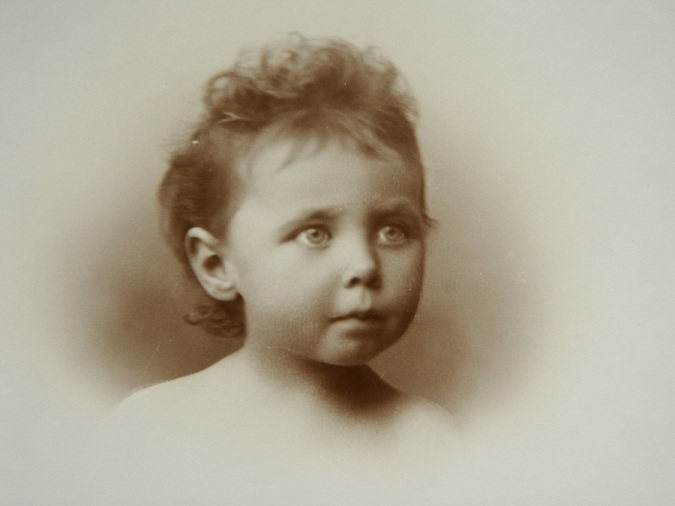
Photo of Princess Elisabeth of Hesse and by Rhine as toddler, taken in 1896.

Elisabeth's parents, nicknamed ‘Ernie’ and ‘Ducky’, were first cousins who married at the instigation of their common grandmother, Queen Victoria. The marriage was an unhappy one from the start. Princess Victoria Melita was eighteen at the time of Elisabeth’s birth. She was fond of Elisabeth, but found it hard to compete with Ernest’s devotion to their daughter. Ernest was convinced even before Elisabeth could speak that he alone could understand her. At the age of six months, she was scheduled to move to a new nursery and her father "consulted her" on her color preferences. He claimed that she made "happy little squeals" when he showed her a particular shade of lilac material. Ernest then decorated her nursery in shades of lilac. He later had a playhouse built for his daughter that stood in its own garden. Adults were forbidden to enter "much to the frustration of royal nurses and tutors, who could be seen pacing up and down impatiently outside as they waited for their high-spirited young charges to stop their games and emerge."

== Childhood ==
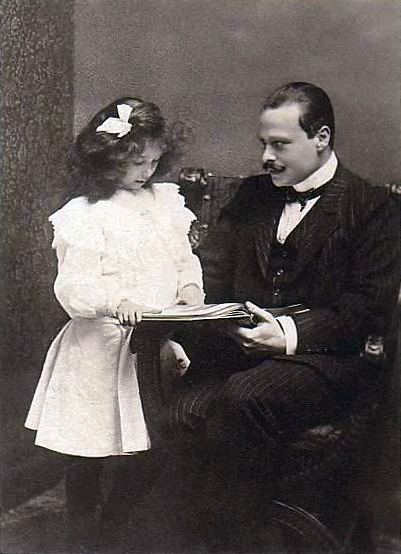
Princess Elisabeth’s death deeply devastated her father, Grand Duke Ernest of Hesse and by Rhine, who viewed her as "the sunshine of his life."

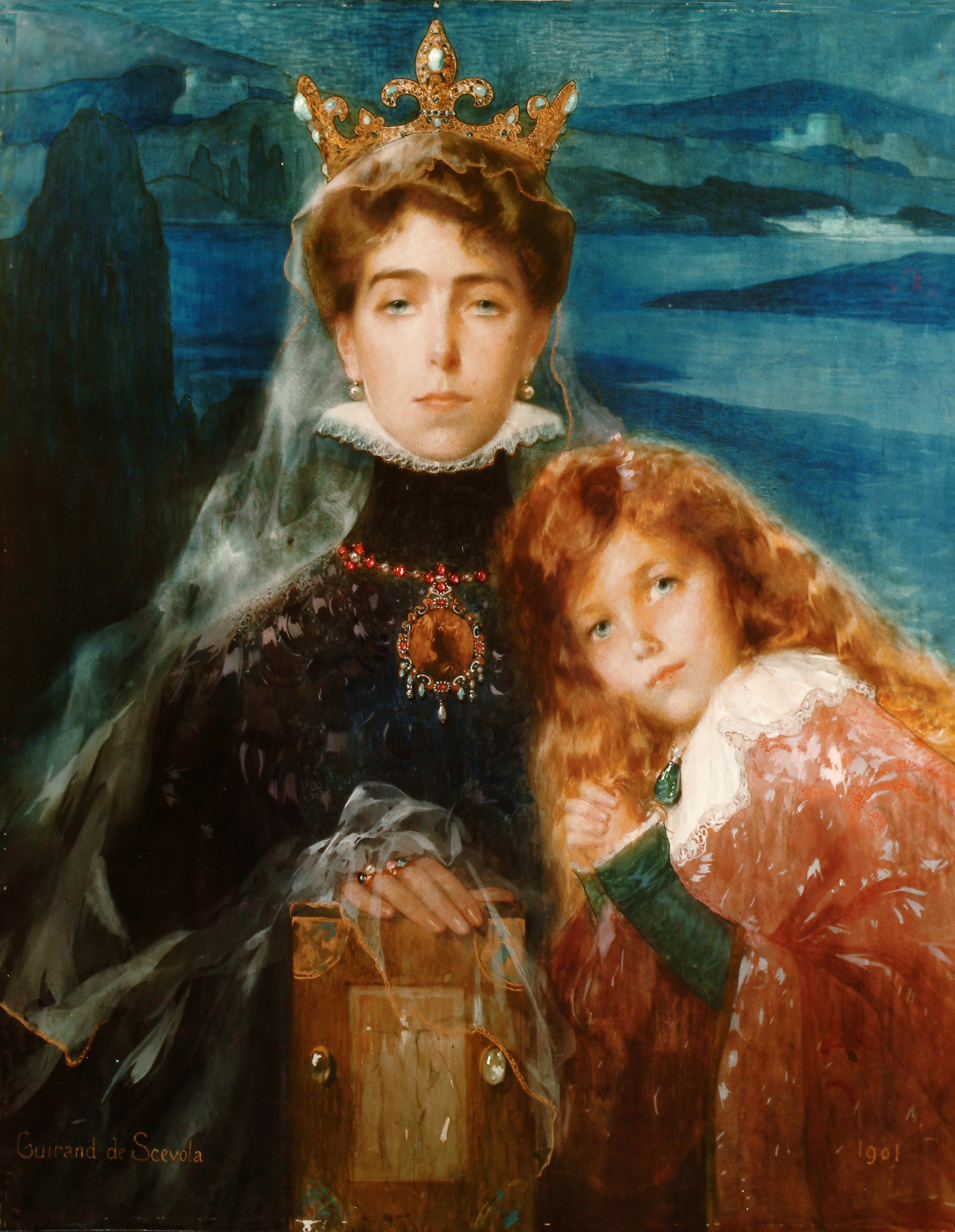
A 1901 portrait by the French Symbolist painter Lucien-Victor Guirand de Scévola of Princess Elisabeth with her mother, Victoria Melita.

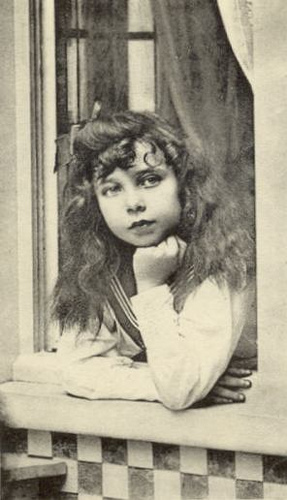
Princess Elisabeth in about 1901, peering from the window of a playhouse her father had built for her.

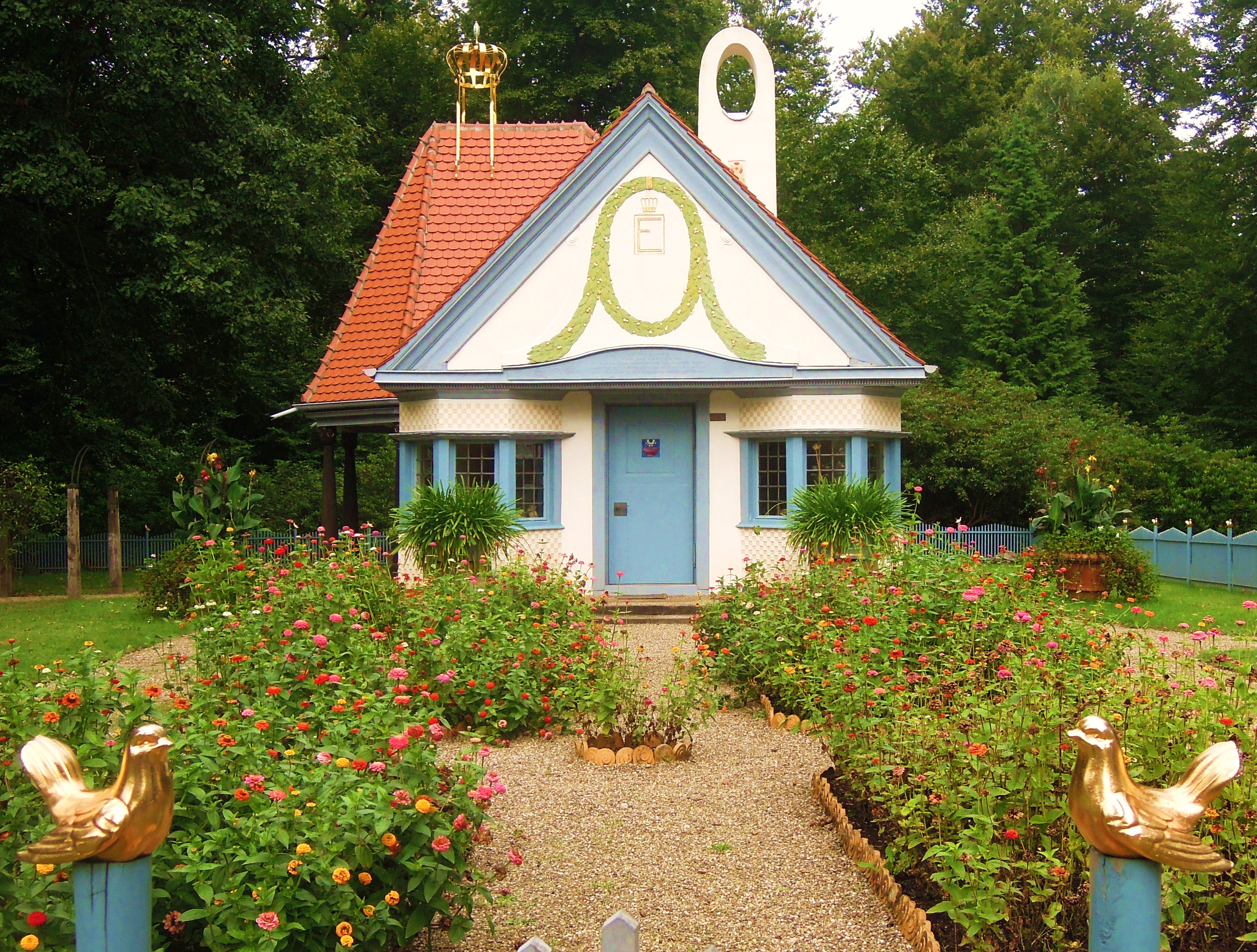
Princess Elisabeth’s playhouse her father, Grand Duke Ernest, had built for her in the garden of Wolfsgarten castle (2013)

Margaret Eagar, a governess for the daughters of Tsar Nicholas II, described Elisabeth as "a sweet and pretty child, with wide grey-blue eyes and a profusion of dark hair. She was much like her mother, not only in face, but also in manner". The four-year-old Elisabeth wanted a baby sister and tried to persuade her aunt and uncle to let her parents adopt one of her paternal first cousins, Tatiana or Maria. Her parents had only one other child together, a stillborn son, in 1900.

She was a favorite with her great-grandmother, Queen Victoria, who called the little girl "my precious". Queen Victoria refused to permit the unhappily married Victoria and Ernest to divorce for the sake of Elisabeth. It was Elisabeth whom Queen Victoria asked to see first and to receive eightieth birthday greetings from in 1899. When the child heard Queen Victoria’s pony cart approaching on the road below Windsor Castle, the four-year-old Elisabeth ran out on the balcony, waving and calling, "Granny Gran, I’m here!" Elisabeth’s playfulness made the queen laugh out loud. Elisabeth’s maternal grandmother, the Dowager Duchess of Saxe-Coburg and Gotha, brought five-year-old Elisabeth to see Queen Victoria on her death bed on 22 January 1901. After the queen died, the child was taken in to see her body and told that her great-grandmother had gone to be with the angels; "but I don’t see the wings", Elisabeth whispered. Elisabeth sat next to her second cousin Prince Edward of York (called David by family and friends, later to become King Edward VIII in 1936) during Queen Victoria’s funeral. "Sweet little David behaved so well during the service", wrote his aunt Maud, "and was supported by the little Hesse girl who took him under her protection and held him most of the time round his neck. They looked such a delightful little couple."

In his memoirs, written more than thirty years after her death, her father wrote of Elisabeth’s "deep sensitivity" and "very large heart". He wrote that "I never knew a child who had so much influence on adults. Her inner personality was very strong, and she had a natural quality that protected her from being spoiled." In October 1901, after the death of Queen Victoria, Elisabeth’s parents finally divorced. Her mother had rekindled a previous romance with another cousin, her future husband, Grand Duke Kirill Vladimirovich of Russia. Her father, according to letters written by her mother, had been caught cavorting with domestic servants. Her parents’ divorce meant that Elisabeth divided her year between Darmstadt and her mother’s new home in Coburg. Elisabeth was at first mistrustful of her mother and resented the divorce, although Victoria did her best to mend her relationship with her daughter during her visit with Elisabeth in the spring of 1902. She was only partially successful, though Victoria enjoyed turning her daughter into an outstanding horsewoman.

In his memoirs, Ernest said he had difficulty persuading Elisabeth to visit her mother. Before one visit, he found the child "whimpering under a sofa, full of despair". He assured Elisabeth that her mother loved her too. "Mama says she loves me, but you do love me", Elisabeth replied. Margaret Eager thought the child’s eyes were "the saddest she had ever seen". "Looking at her I used to wonder what those wide grey-blue eyes saw, to bring such a look of sadness to the childish face", she wrote. Eagar wondered if Elisabeth had a premonition of her own death because she often told her cousin, Grand Duchess Olga Nikolaevna, that "I shall never see this again". However, despite Elisabeth’s sad eyes, she was generally a sweet, happy child who was a peacemaker when her cousins had a dispute.

== Death ==
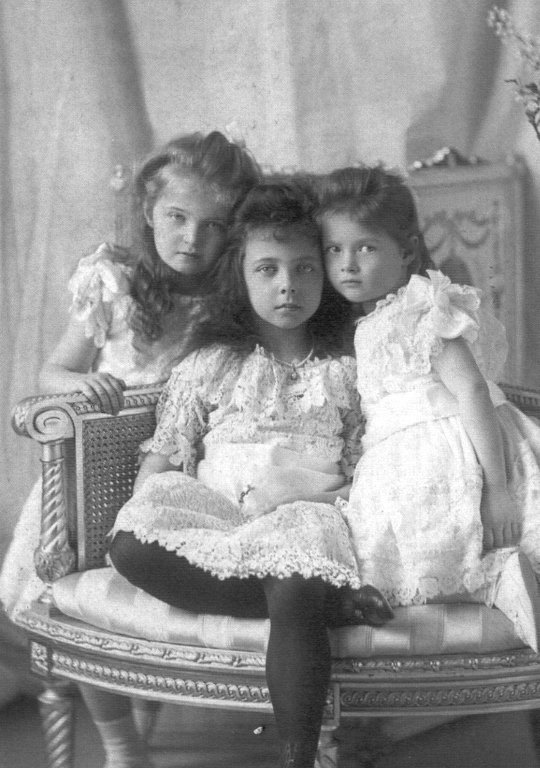
Photo of Princess Elisabeth of Hesse and by Rhine with her cousins, Grand Duchess Olga Nikolaevna of Russia and Grand Duchess Tatiana Nikolaevna of Russia, taken in 1900.

On 6 October 1903, Ernest hosted a large family gathering at Darmstadt for the wedding of his niece, Princess Alice of Battenberg, to Prince Andrew of Greece and Denmark. A few weeks later he took Elisabeth to stay with his younger sister, Tsarina Alexandra Feodorovna, her husband, Tsar Nicholas II, and their family. At the imperial family’s hunting lodge in Skierniewice, Poland, Elisabeth went on long walks and had picnics in the forest with her cousins.

Elisabeth's nanny, who called her "my baby", woke Elisabeth in the middle of the night and settled her in a window seat of the nursery so that she might look out on the game spread out upon the grounds below. One morning, the eight-year-old awoke with a sore throat and pains in her chest, which the Russian Court doctor put down to too much excitement with her cousins the previous day. Her fever rose to 104 degrees. The imperial party didn’t believe her illness was a serious one and went ahead with their plans for the day and attended the theater as planned. By the evening Elisabeth was in even more severe pain and had started gasping for breath. A specialist was summoned from Warsaw. The specialist gave her injections of caffeine and camphor to stimulate her slowing heart, but without success.

"Suddenly she sat up in her bed and looked from one to the other of us with wide, frightened eyes", wrote Eagar. "She cried out suddenly, "I’m dying! I’m dying!" She was coaxed to lie down again but remained agitated. "The child turned to me, and said anxiously, 'Send a telegram to mama.'" Eagar promised it would be done. She added, "immediately." ... We continued to fan the feeble spark of life, but moment by moment it declined. She began to talk to her cousins and seemed to imagine she was playing with them. She asked for little Anastasie and I brought the wee thing into the room. The dying eyes rested on her for a moment, and Anastasie said, "Poor cousin Ella! Poor Princess Elisabeth!" I took the baby out of the room." Doctors told Alexandra that the child’s mother should be notified, but the telegram did not arrive until the following morning when Elisabeth had already died. An autopsy following her death confirmed that she had died of virulent typhoid, although it was rumored she had eaten from a poisoned dish intended for the Tsar.

== Funeral and legacy ==
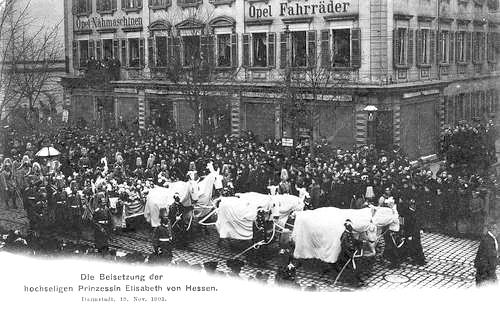
The funeral procession for Princess Elisabeth in Darmstadt's Rheinstraße

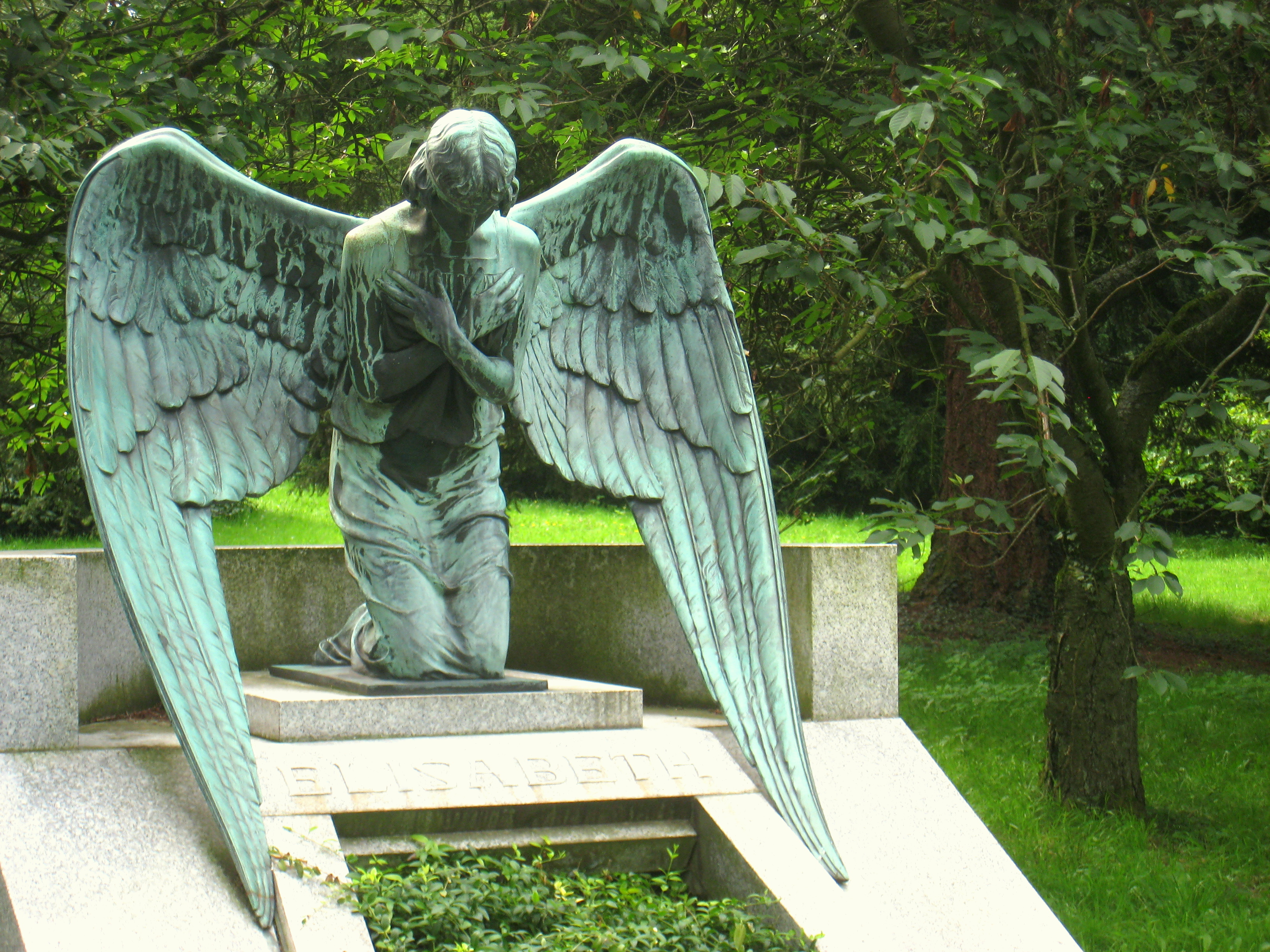
Princess Elisabeth’s memorial (Rosenhöhe)

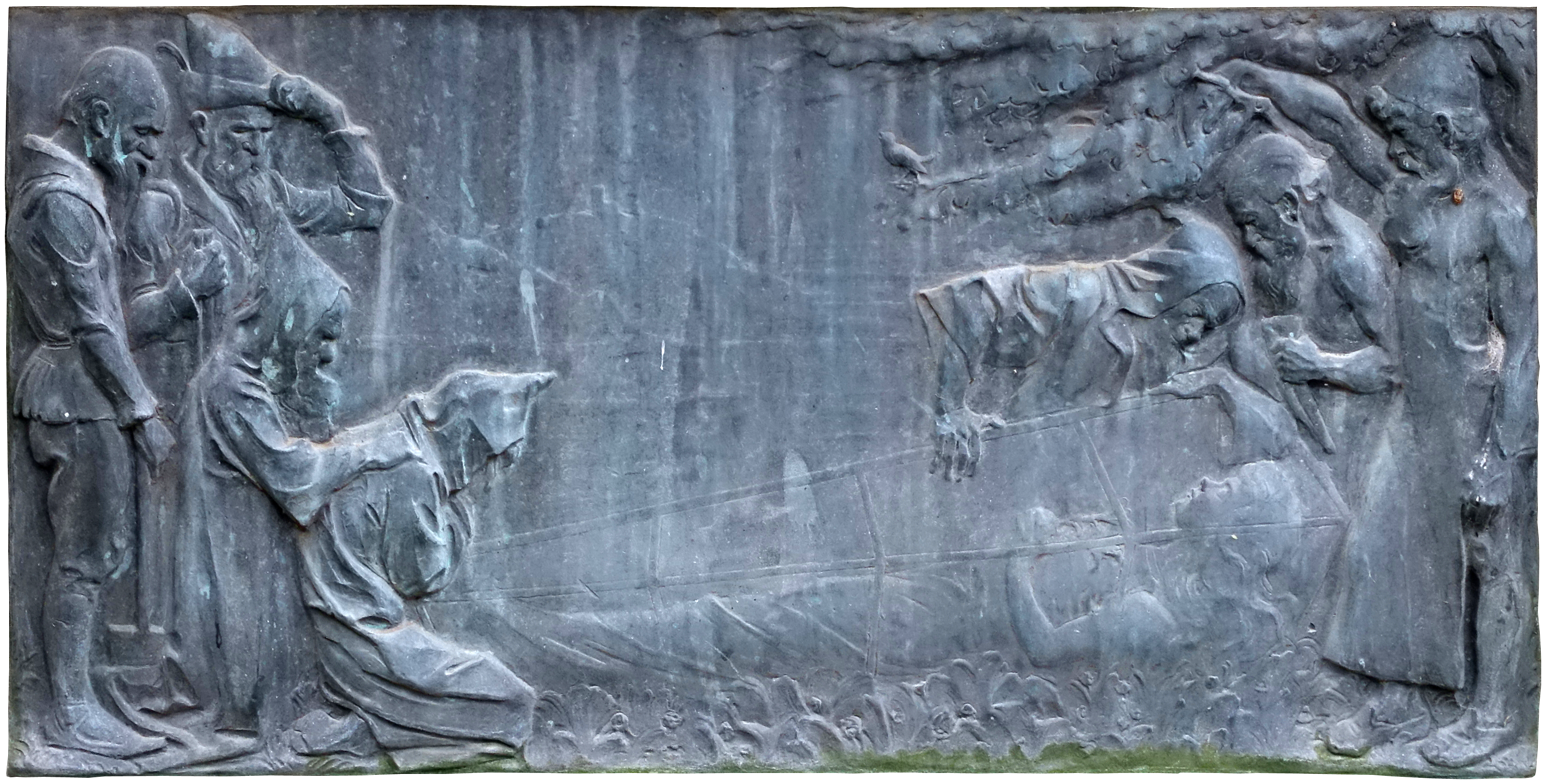
Schneewittchen commemorative relief for Princess Elisabeth in the Herrngarten in Darmstadt with inscription: "To our little Princess, the children of Darmstadt"

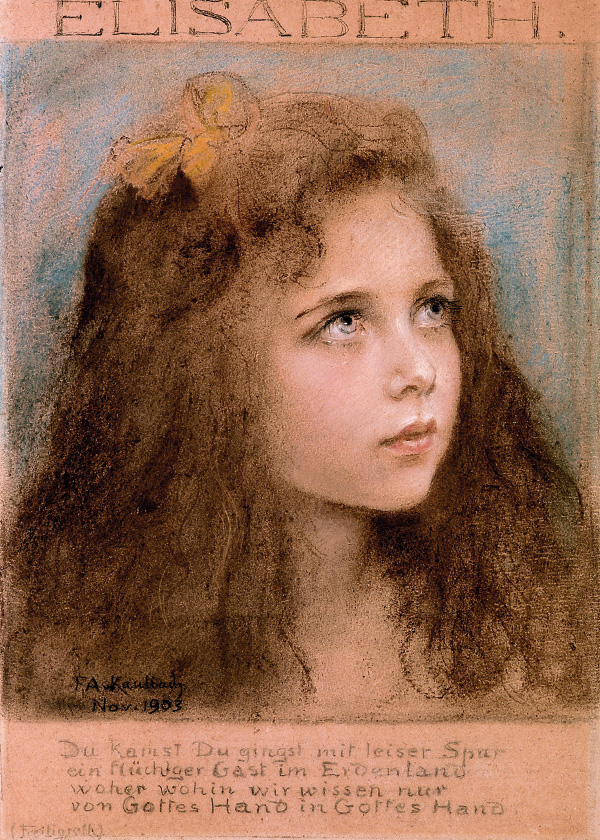
A memorial drawing of Elisabeth by Friedrich August von Kaulbach (1903)

Elisabeth’s body was placed in a silver casket, a gift from Nicholas II, for the journey back to Darmstadt. Her father arranged a white funeral, with white instead of black for the funeral trappings, white flowers, and white horses for the procession. The Hessian people came out by the thousands to view the funeral procession and "sobbed in unison so that I could hear it", Ernest wrote.

A cousin, Kaiser Wilhelm II, expressed shock at the child’s death in a letter to Tsar Nicholas II on the day after. "How joyous and merry she was that day at Wolfsgarten, when I was there, so full of life and fun and health ... What a terrible heartrending blow for poor Ernie, who doted and adored that little enchantress!"

Elisabeth was buried in the Rosenhöhe with other members of the Hessian grand ducal family. A marble angel was later installed to watch over her grave. In a final gesture to Princess Elisabeth and Grand Duke Ernest, Victoria Melita placed her badge of the Order of Hesse, granted to her upon her marriage, into Elisabeth’s coffin. Ernest was still devastated by the memory of his daughter’s death thirty years later. "My little Elisabeth", he wrote in his memoirs, "was the sunshine of my life."

== Archives ==
Documents about Elisabeth’s death, including telegrams and letters from relatives and a Hessian employee to Elisabeth’s aunt, Princess Alexandra of Saxe-Coburg and Gotha, are preserved in the Hohenlohe Central Archive (Hohenlohe-Zentralarchiv Neuenstein), which is in Neuenstein Castle, Baden-Württemberg, Germany.

== Ancestry ==
Ancestors of Princess Elisabeth of Hesse and by Rhine

8. Prince Charles of Hesse and by Rhine
4. Louis IV, Grand Duke of Hesse and by Rhine
9. Princess Elisabeth of Prussia
2. Ernest Louis, Grand Duke of Hesse and by Rhine
10. Prince Albert of Saxe-Coburg and Gotha
5. Princess Alice of the United Kingdom
11. Victoria of the United Kingdom
1. Princess Elisabeth of Hesse and by Rhine
12. Prince Albert of Saxe-Coburg and Gotha (= 10)
6. Alfred, Duke of Saxe-Coburg and Gotha
13. Victoria of the United Kingdom (= 11)
3. Princess Victoria Melita of Saxe-Coburg and Gotha
14. Alexander II of Russia
7. Grand Duchess Maria Alexandrovna of Russia
15. Princess Marie of Hesse and by Rhine
