= Margaretta Eagar =

Imperial nanny in Russia

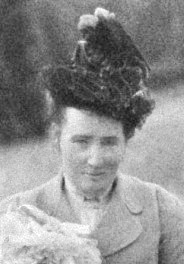
- Eagar, c. 1902
- Born: 12 August 1863; Limerick, Ireland
- Died: 2 August 1936 (aged 72); Keynsham, England
- Occupation: Governess
- Parents: Francis McGillycuddy Eagar (father); Frances Margaret Holden (mother)

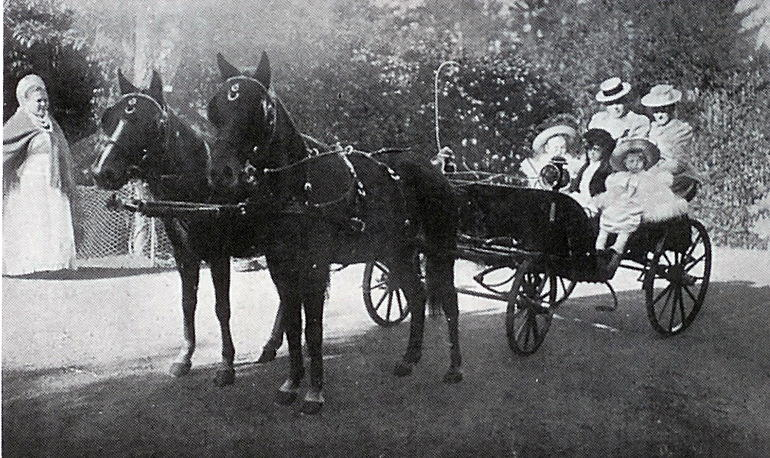
Margaretta Eagar, back, and another nanny with Grand Duchess Olga Nikolaevna of Russia, Princess Elisabeth of Hesse and by Rhine, and Grand Duchess Tatiana Nikolaevna of Russia, c. 1900.

Margaretta or Margaret Alexandra Eagar (12 August 1863 — 8 August 1936) was an Irishwoman who took on the role as a nanny and nurse in a Russian Imperial household in St Petersburg to the four daughters of Emperor and Empress Nicholas II and Alexandra Feodorovna of Russia, the Grand Duchesses Olga, Tatiana, Maria and Anastasia—known collectively as OTMA—from 1898 to 1904.

In 1906, she then went on to become an author. She wrote a memoir entitled 'Six Years at the Russian Court' about her experience working for the family and her time spent in Russia.

== Early life ==
Margaretta Eagar was born in Limerick, Ireland on 12 August 1863. She was born to a Protestant couple, Francis McGillycuddy Eagar and Frances Margaret Holden. From 1855–80, her father, Francis Eagar was governor of Limerick county gaol. She was the fifth of the couples eleven children. She was trained as a medical nurse in Belfast, Northern Ireland and worked at one point as matron of an orphanage.

== Time at Court ==
Eagar was appointed nurse to the daughters of Nicholas II in 1898 and remained with them until 1904. Grand Duchess Olga Alexandrovna, an aunt of the girls later recalled Eagar's great love of politics. As a toddler, Maria once escaped from her bath and ran naked up and down the palace corridor while Eagar discussed the Dreyfus Affair with a friend. "Fortunately, I arrived just at that moment, picked her up and carried her back to Miss Eagar, who was still talking about Dreyfus," recalled the Grand Duchess.

The four grand duchesses began learning English from Eagar and, by 1904—by which time Eagar had left the Imperial Court—had developed a slight Hiberno-English accent in their pronunciation. In 1908 English tutor Charles Sydney Gibbes was brought in to "correct" this.

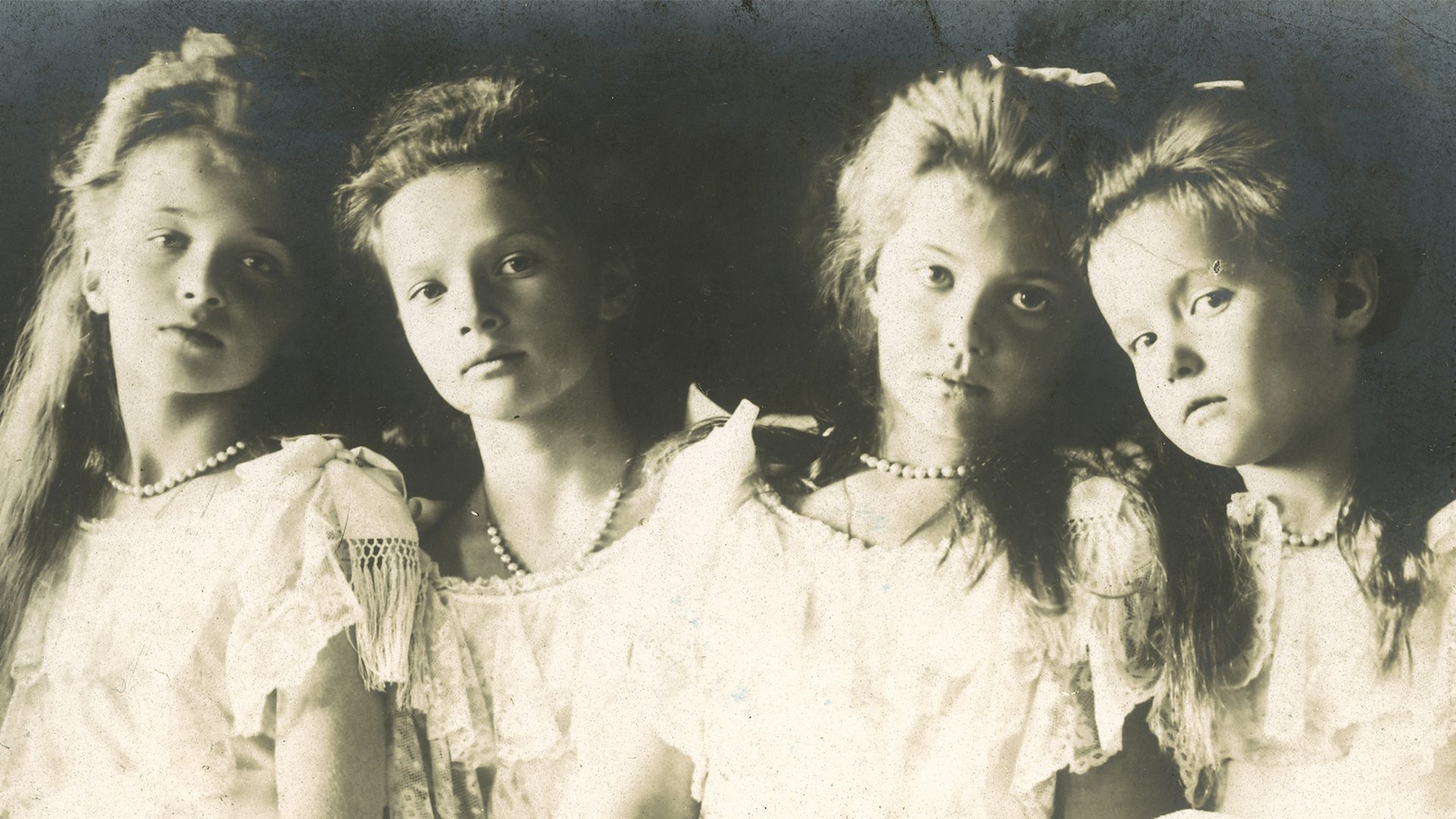
From left to right, Grand Duchesses Olga, Tatiana, Maria, and Anastasia Nikolaevna in 1906.

Eagar, who grew fond of all four grand duchesses, wrote in her book that she left the Russian Court for personal reasons. However, it was possible that she was dismissed due to the tense political situation surrounding the Russo-Japanese War, as the United Kingdom largely sided with Japan.

== Later life ==
Eagar received a pension from the Russian government for her time as a nurse. She exchanged letters with the grand duchesses describing her work as a governess for other families up until their murder in July 1918. Family members stated that she remained haunted by the brutal murder of the family for the rest of her life. In later years, she ran a boarding house. She died in a nursing home in 1936, at the age of 72.

== See also ==
- Sydney Gibbes
- Pierre Gilliard
