= Neuenstein Castle =

Coordinates: 49.2041°N 9.5788°E

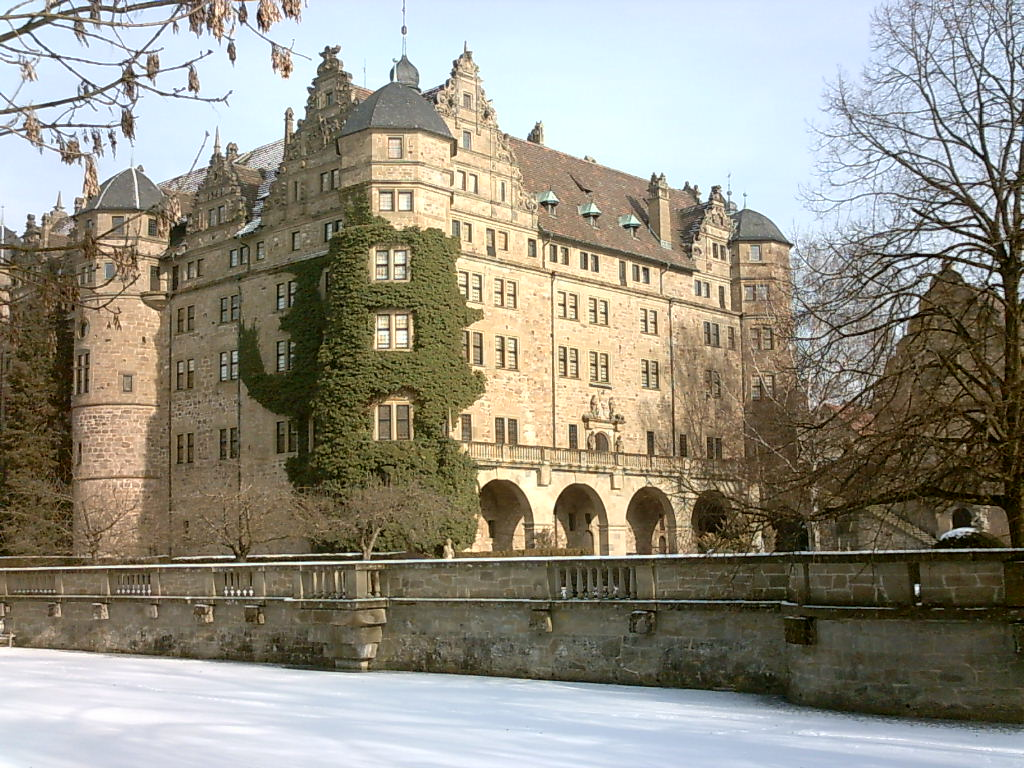
Neuenstein Castle, winter 2006

Neuenstein Castle (German: Schloss Neuenstein) is a castle in the middle of the town of Neuenstein. Built as the seat of the Hohenlohe-Neuenstein noble family, it now houses a castle museum and, with the Neuenstein Hohenlohe Central Archives, the shared house archive of the House of Hohenlohe, which is looked after by the State of Baden-Württemberg.

== History ==
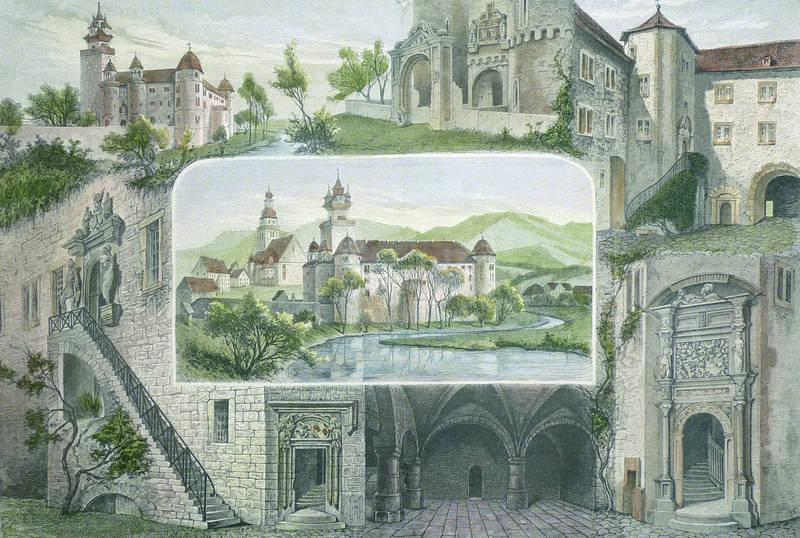
Colored wood engraving, Otto Baisch, 1880

The origins of the present castle can be found in a Hohenstaufen moated castle from the early 13th century. It stood on a sandbank in a swampy area near an old long-distance trade route that led from the Rhine via Wimpfen east to the Danube.

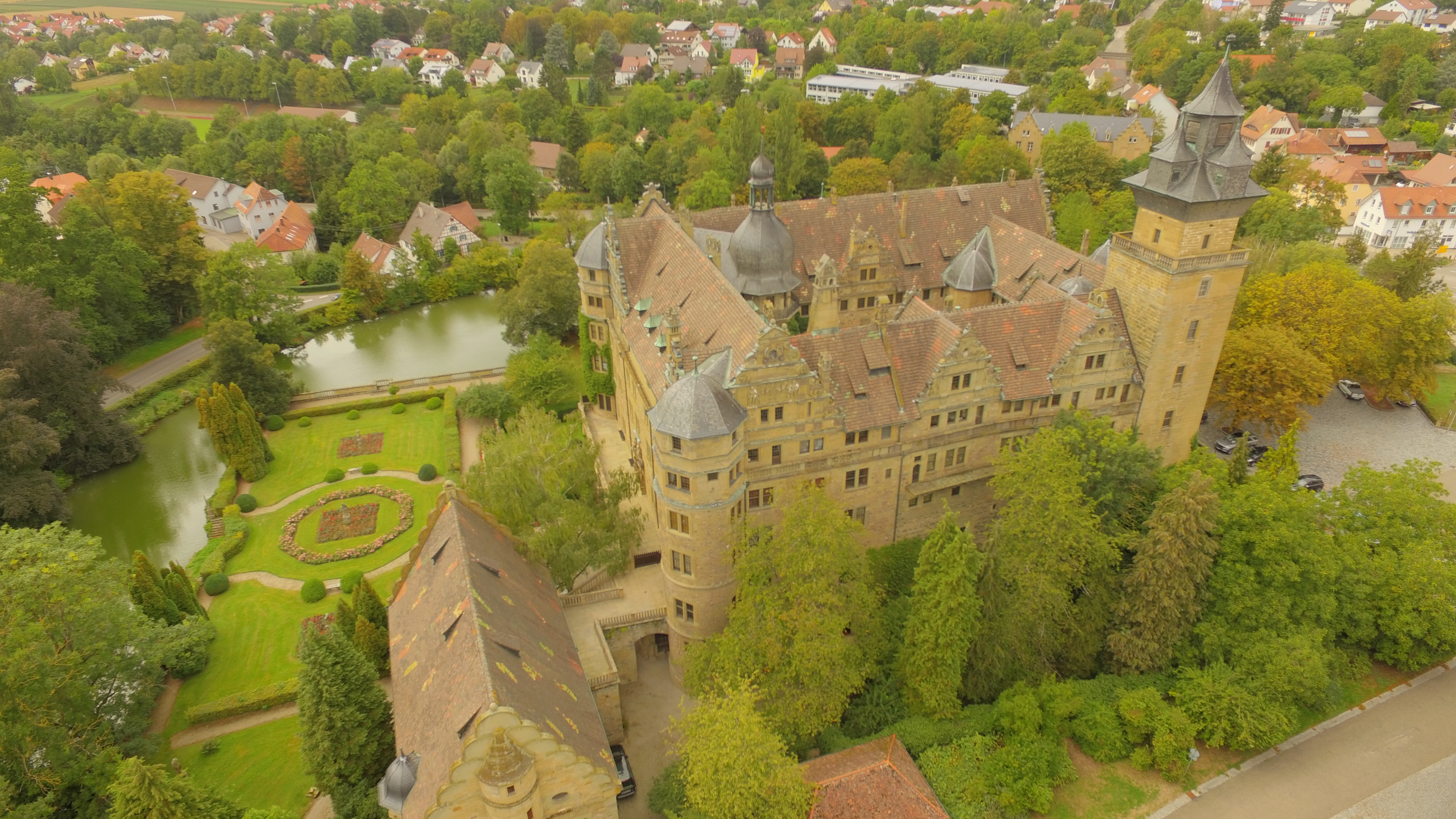
Aerial view, 2015

Around 1230, the complex was owned by the Lords of Stein, whose descendants later called themselves "von Neuenstein". Around 1300, the Neuenstein estate came to the House of Hohenlohe, which still owns the castle today. Gottfried von Hohenlohe, who lived at Weikersheim Castle, was a follower of Emperor Frederick II and tutor to his son Conrad IV. He allegedly survived a murder plot in Regensburg in 1250, the mastermind of which was Albert I, the Bishop of Regensburg. King Konrad gave Gottfried fiefdoms in Regensburg in gratitude for his help. This also included the bailiwick of the canons' monastery of Öhringen, founded in 1037, as well as the castles and manors in Neuenstein and Waldenburg. The different castles were divided many times between the respective generations. Louis Casimir, Count of Hohenlohe-Neuenstein (1517–1568) founded the Neuenstein line (with the possessions of Langenburg, Ingelfingen, Öhringen and Kirchberg), one of the two main lines of the House of Hohenlohe that still exist today; the other (the Waldenburg line) was founded by his half-brother Eberhard, Count of Hohenlohe-Waldenburg (1535–1570) (with Waldenburg, Bartenstein and Schillingsfürst) in the main state division of 1551. After the complex had already been expanded in the 15th century, Count Louis Casimir had the castle redesigned into a castle in the Renaissance style by the Heilbronn master builder Balthasar Wolff. The expansion lasted until the beginning of the 17th century.

After Wolfgang Julius von Hohenlohe-Neuenstein died in 1698, the family moved their residence to Öhringen to the former canons' monastery, which was renovated in baroque style in keeping with contemporary taste. Neuenstein Castle subsequently stood empty and rapidly fell into disrepair. Later it served as a breeding and workhouse, a retirement home and an orphanage.

=== 1800 to present ===
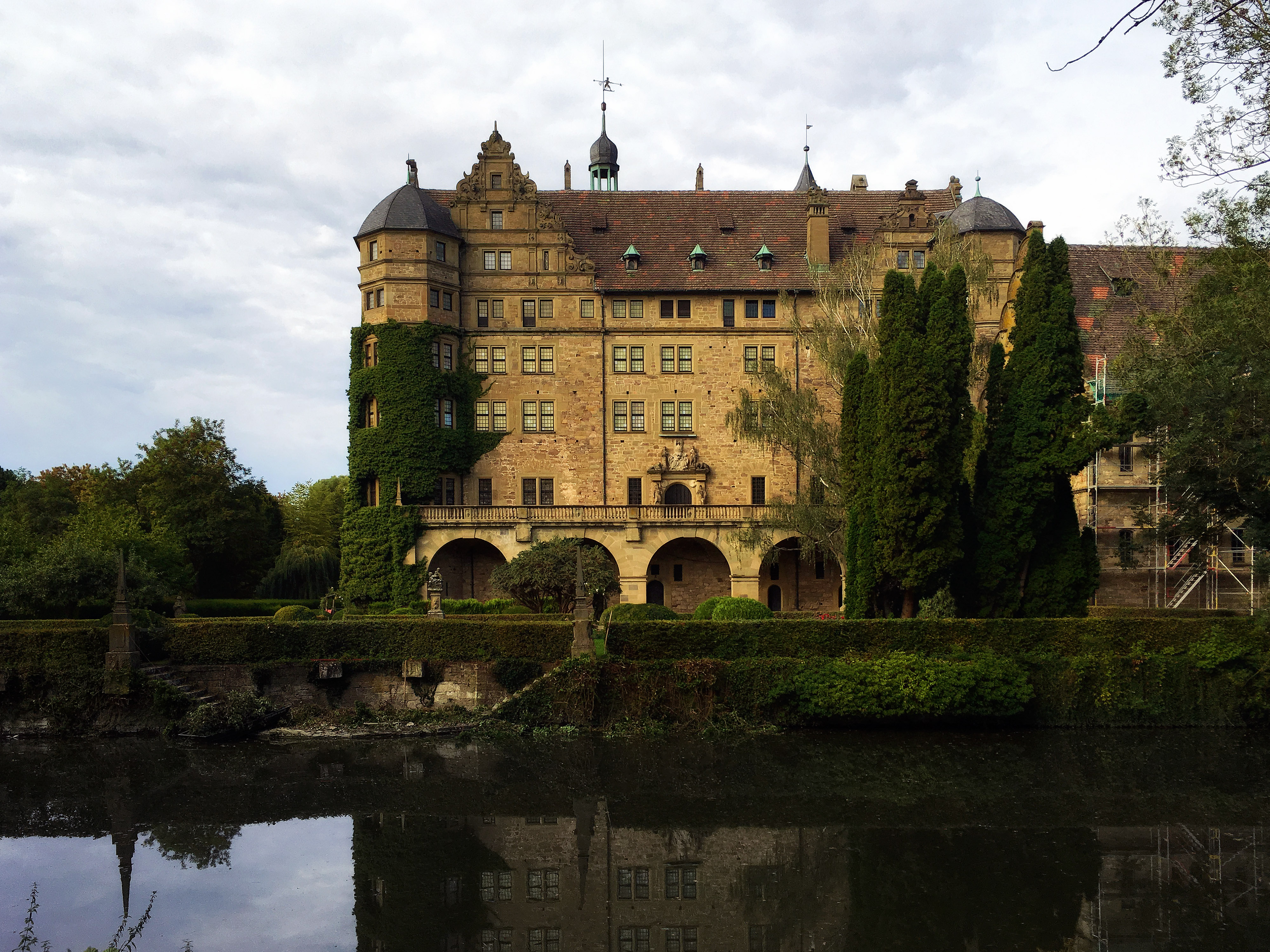
The castle, 2018

From 1870 onwards, renovation work was carried out in the Imperial Hall in order to then lay the foundation for a family museum of the House of Hohenlohe with a collection of antiques from Kirchberg Castle. It was one of the first private museums in Germany and was open to the public from 1878.

At the beginning of the 20th century, Prince Christian Kraft Herzog zu Hohenlohe-Öhringe commissioned the architect and castle researcher Bodo Ebhardt to carry out a comprehensive restoration of the castle. The work took place between 1906 and 1925. In the course of this, the complex was expanded by another floor, which, as a new building, enabled greater living comfort than the Renaissance floors. After the expropriation of their Silesian residence Sławięcice Palace in 1945 and the sales of the Kirchberg and Ingelfingen castles in 1952 and Öhringen in 1961 (as well as the Friedrichsruhe hunting lodge in Zweiflingen in 2005), Neuenstein Castle is now both a museum and residence of the owner, Prince of Hohenlohe-Oehringen (b. 1933).

=== Architecture ===
The Renaissance style castle is a closed four-wing building with six floors. At its northwest corner stands the Romanesque keep of the former castle. Two further corners are occupied by high round towers. A bridge leads to the entrance, which is decorated with the coats of arms of Louis Casimir, Count of Hohenlohe-Neuenstein, and his wife Anna von Solms-Laubach.

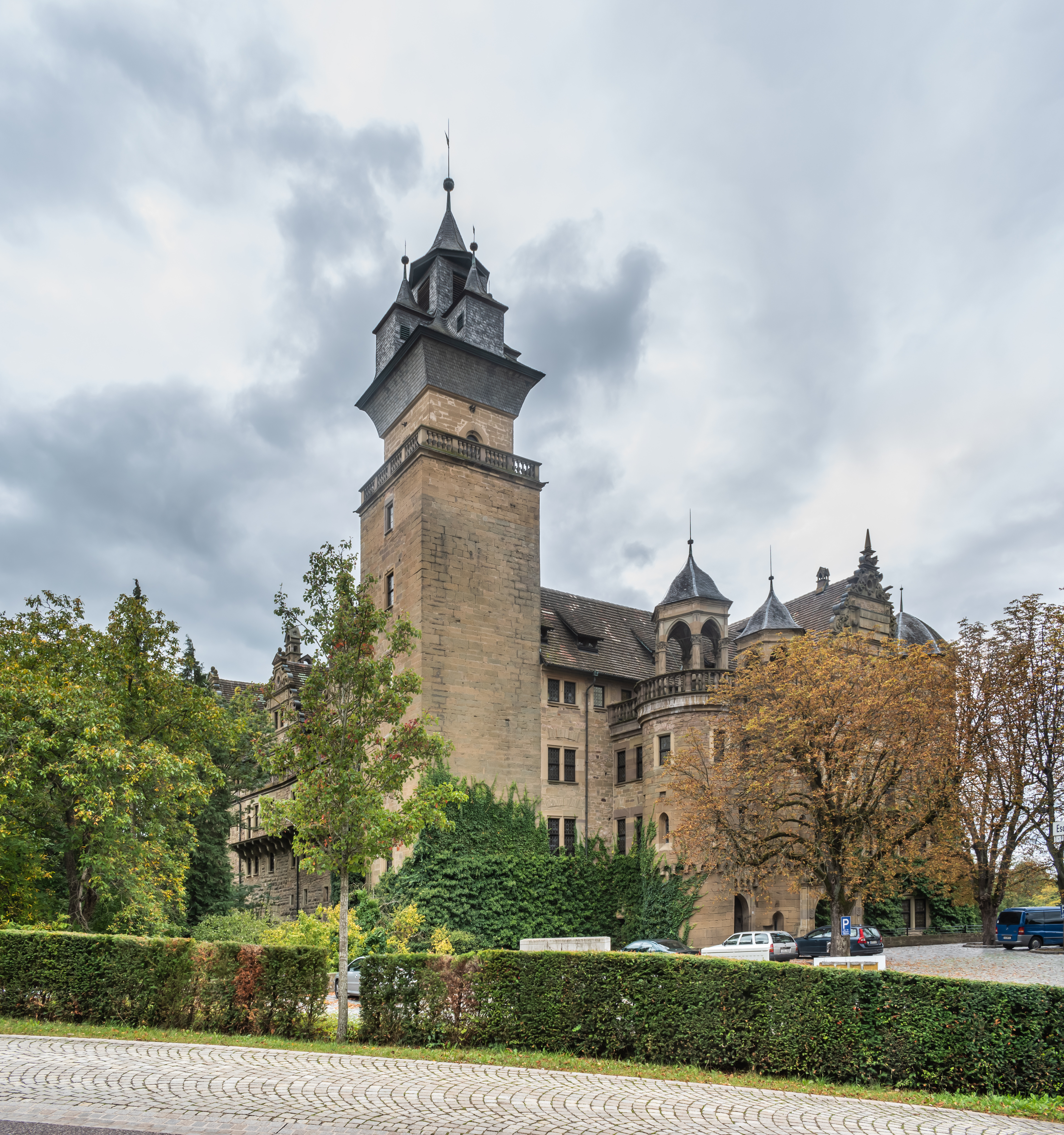
View from approach, 2020

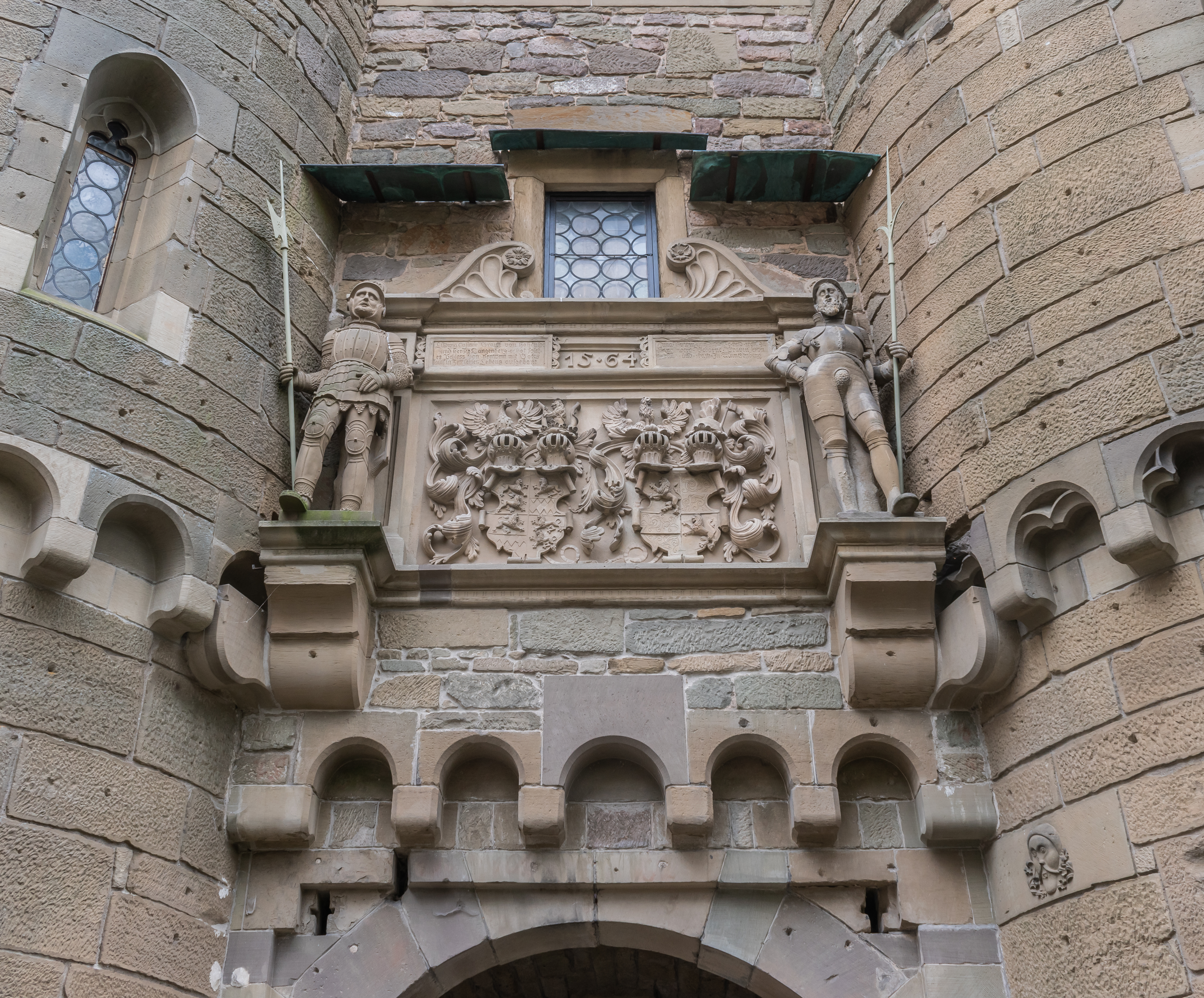
Relief over the entrance, 2020

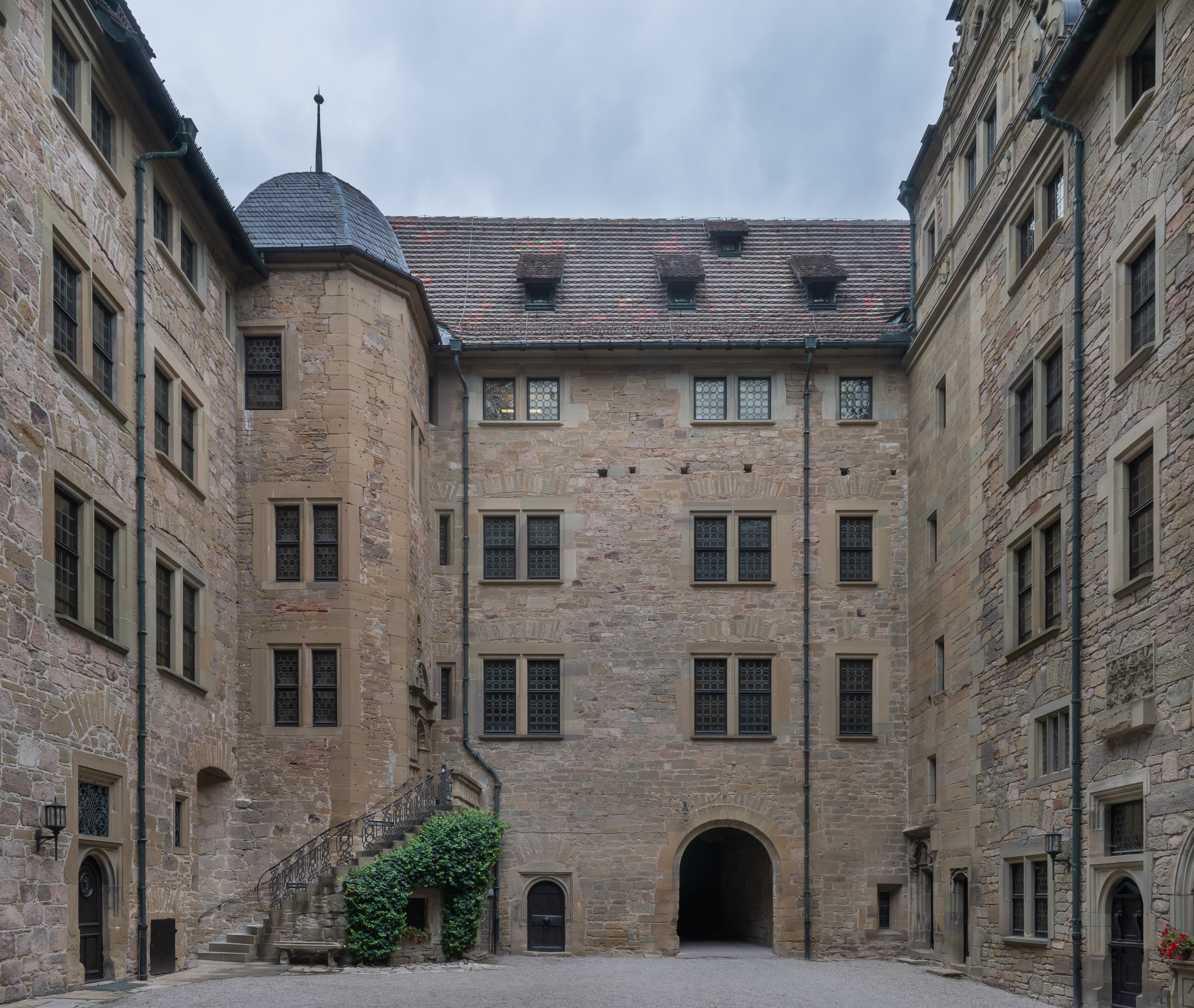
Interior courtyard, 2020

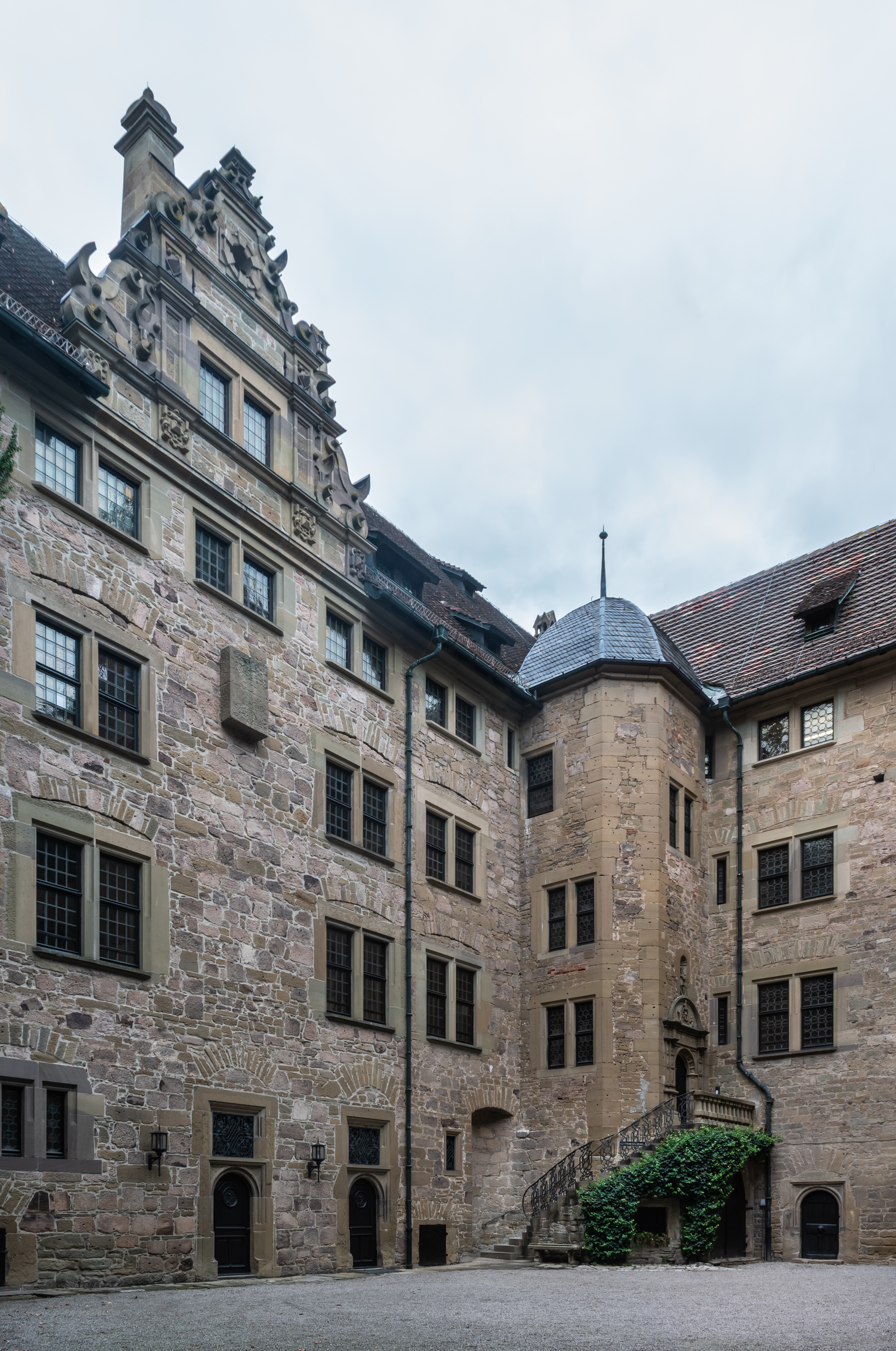
Interior courtyard, 2020

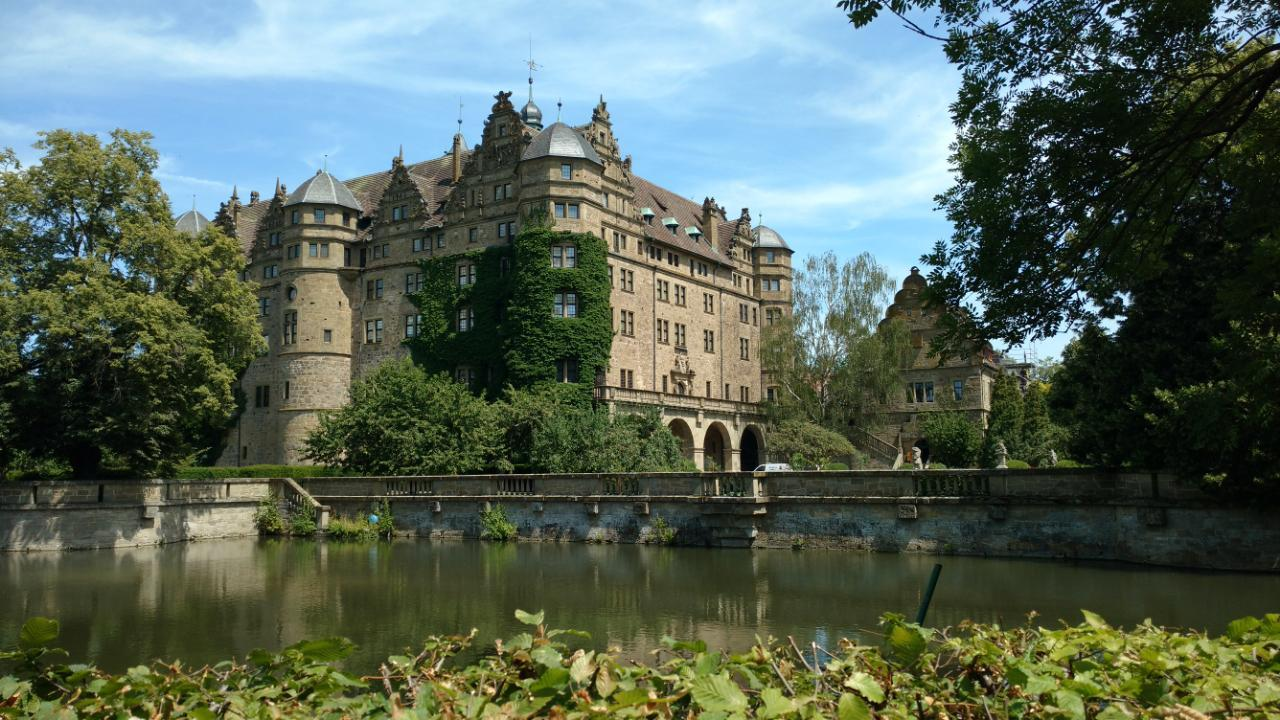
The castle, 2019

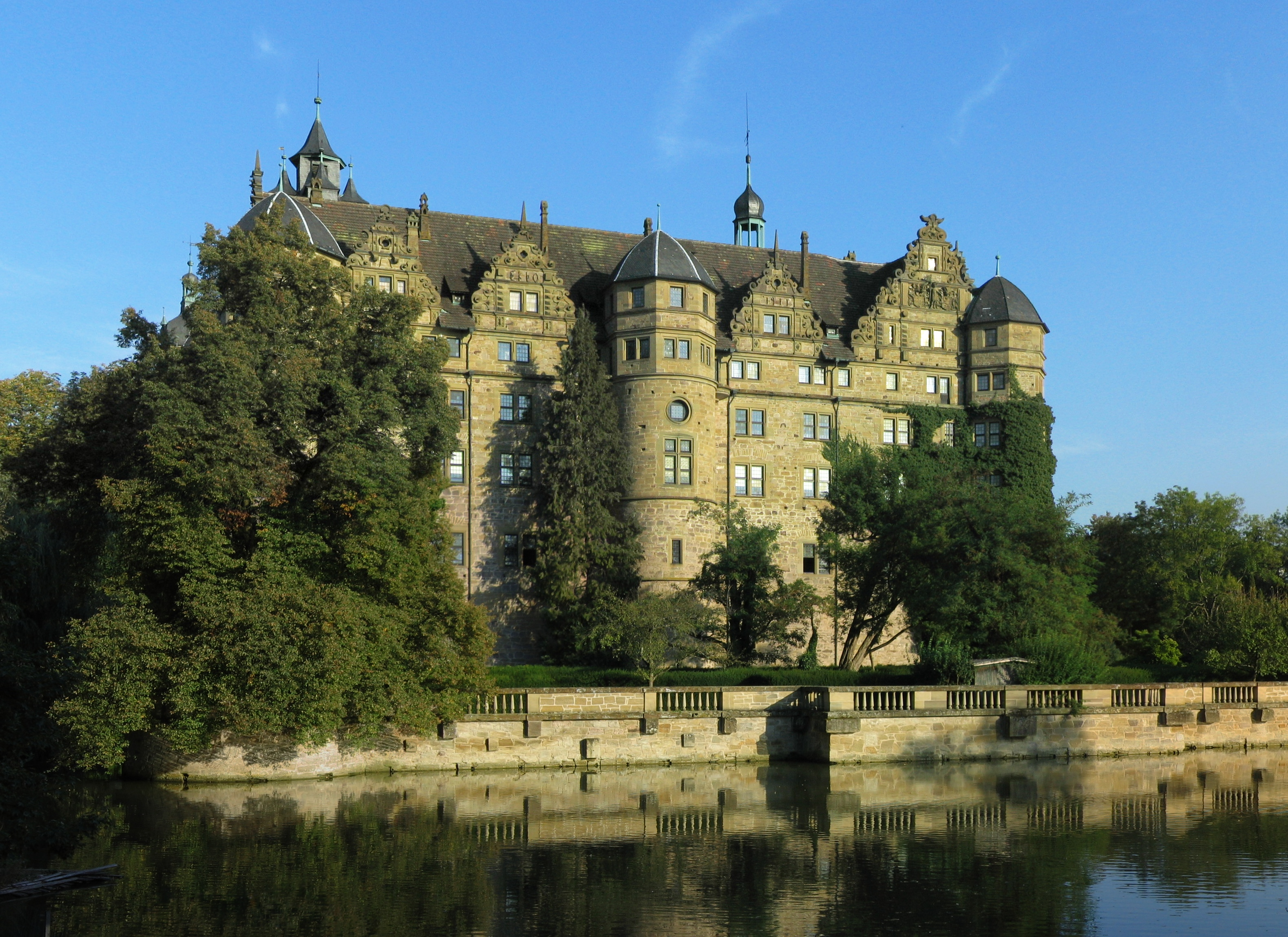
The castle, 2007
