= Princess Vera Constantinovna of Russia =

Russian princess (1906–2001)

Vera Konstantinovna Romanoff
- Princess of the Imperial Blood
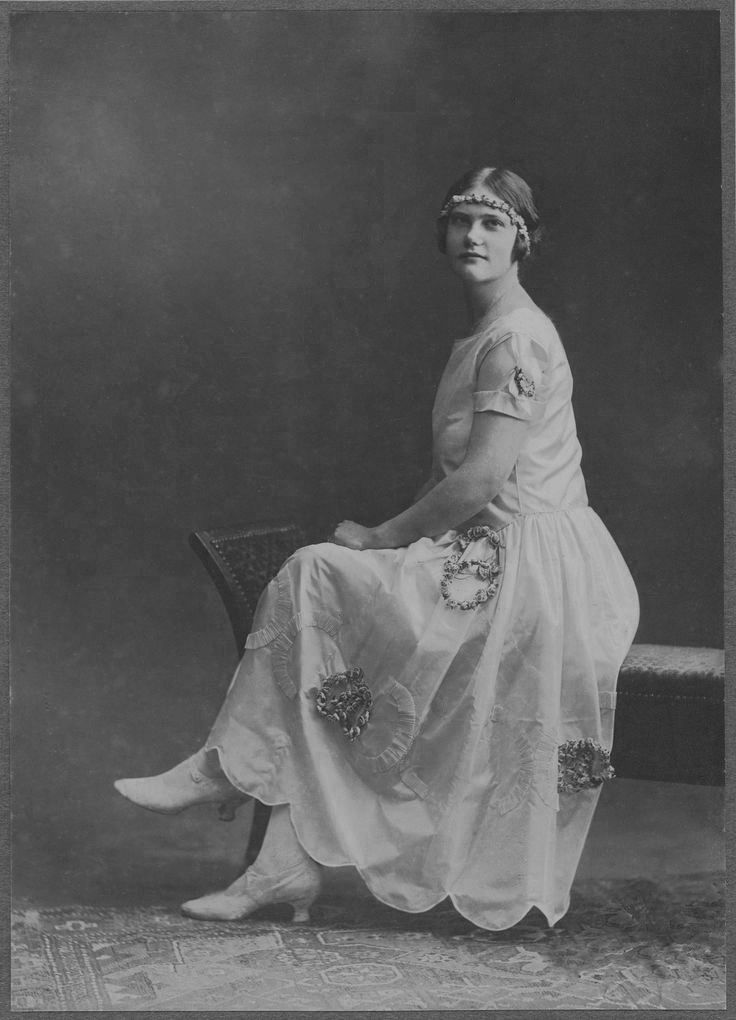
- Vera in 1926
- Born: 24 April 1906; Pavlovsk Palace, Pavlovsk, Russia
- Died: 11 January 2001 (aged 94); Nyack, Orangetown, Rockland County, New York, U.S.
Names
- Vera Constantinovna Romanova
- House: Holstein-Gottorp-Romanov
- Father: Grand Duke Constantine Constantinovich of Russia
- Mother: Princess Elisabeth of Saxe-Altenburg

Princess of the Imperial Blood Vera Konstantinovna of Russia (Russian: Княжна императорской крови Вера Константиновна; 24 April [O.S. 11 April] 1906 – 11 January 2001), was the youngest child of Grand Duke Konstantine Konstantinovich of Russia and his wife, Grand Duchess Elizabeth Mavrikievna. A great-granddaughter of Nicholas I of Russia, she was born in Russia and was a childhood playmate of the younger children of Nicholas II of Russia. She lost much of her family during World War I and the Russian Revolution. At age twelve, she escaped revolutionary Russia, fleeing with her mother and brother George to Sweden. She spent the rest of her long life in exile, first in Western Europe and from the 1950s in the United States.

== Early life ==
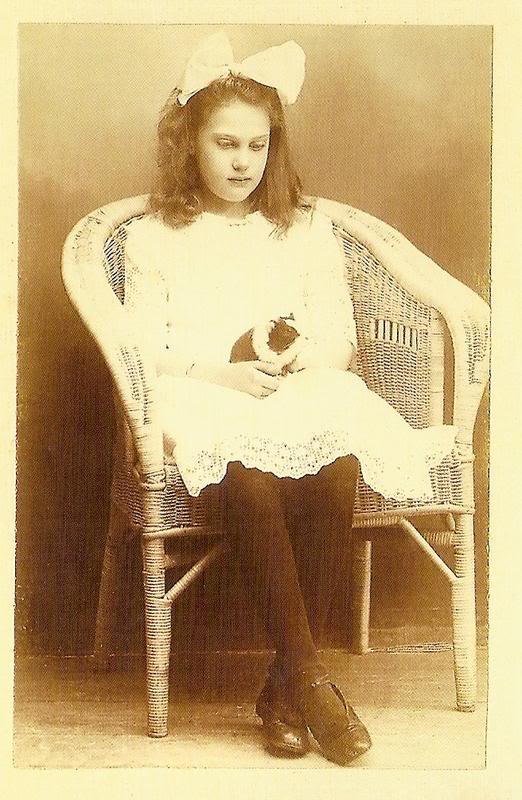
Princess Vera Constantinovna of Russia circa 1914-17

Princess Vera Constantinovna of Russia was born at Pavlovsk on 24 April [O.S. 11 April] 1906. She was the youngest child among the nine children of Grand Duke Constantine Constantinovich of Russia and his wife Grand Duchess Elizabeth Mavrikievna, born Princess Elizabeth of Saxe-Altenburg. She was going to be named Marianne in honor of her mother's favorite sister, Princess Marie Anne of Saxe-Altenburg, but her paternal aunt Grand Duchess Vera Constantinovna of Russia insisted that her niece should be named after her, in her family, Vera is affectionately called "Verusia". Her godparents were her brother Prince Constantine Constantinovich of Russia and Empress Alexandra Feodorovna. Vera Constantinovna spent her first years in fabulous splendour during the last period of Imperial Russia. Her father, a respected poet, was a first cousin once removed of Tsar Nicholas II. Her father, who recorded her birth meticulously in his private journals, noted the profound emotional impact of her arrival, viewing it as a divine solace following the sudden infant death of their previous daughter Natalia in 1905:

...At 8 o'clock Ott and Zhenya appeared, and only 23 minutes later my wife and I heard the cry of little Verusia in boundless happiness. Instantly her pains vanished, and she became radiant, content, and above all immensely happy with the arrival of her baby daughter. It seems as though God has rewarded us to compensate for the loss of our poor, beloved Natusi ... Vera is a healthy, plump, and sturdy child. At birth she looked a bit bluish, but that quickly passed, and her face and body turned rosy. She has long, dark hair and long fingers.

— Grand Duke Konstantin Konstantinovich of Russia, Diary Entry, 11 April 1906

Princess Vera was eight years old when Archduke Franz Ferdinand of Austria was assassinated and World War I broke out, in the summer of 1914. Vera was with her parents and her brother George in Germany visiting her maternal relatives in Altenburg at the start of the war. The conflict took them by surprise, trapping them in Germany, an enemy country. It was thanks to the intervention of the German Empress, Augusta Viktoria of Schleswig-Holstein that they were allowed to return to Russia. Vera's older siblings joined the Russian army in the military effort, and her favorite brother Oleg was killed in action. She was considered too young and was not allowed to attend her brother's funeral. Her brother's death was just the first of many family misfortunes.

The following year, her father died of a heart attack in her presence. In a letter to her brother, she later described how she was sitting with her father in his study, when Grand Duke Constantine Constantinovich began gasping. Princess Vera managed to push open a heavy door between her parents' studies, pushing aside several heavy plants that stood in front of the door, and ran to her mother crying that her father couldn't breathe. Her mother ran after her, but the grand duke had already died.

== Revolution ==
Left to right back row: Princess Tatiana; Prince Gabriel; Prince Ivan; Grand Duchess Elizabeta Mavrikievna and Grand Duke Constantine Constantinovich. Front row: Princess Vera; Prince George; Prince Igor; Prince Oleg and Prince Constantine, 1911.

After the death of her father, in 1916, Vera moved with her mother and her brother George to the Marble Palace in Petrograd, leaving Pavlovsk to her eldest brother Prince Ivan Konstantinovich. During the chaotic rule of the Provisional Government, and after the October Revolution, Princess Vera, her mother, and her brother George, remained at Pavlovsk. For a time, they lived a precarious existence, and her mother was forced to secretly sell family heirlooms to provide for the family. They stayed in the palace until the summer of 1918, when the revolution forced them to leave it and to take an apartment in the city.

During the Russian revolution, four of Vera's brothers were imprisoned by the Bolsheviks. Only Prince Gabriel was eventually released. Three of her brothers (Ivan, Constantine and Igor) were killed at Alapaevsk, along with other Romanov relatives, in July 1918.

Initially, Grand Duchess Elizabeth Mavrikievna was reluctant to leave Russia remembering her late husband's words, that if Russia was in need, it was a Romanov's duty to help. However, with their situation becoming increasingly dangerous, she accepted an offer made by her friend, Queen Victoria of Sweden, through the Swedish Ambassador Edvard Brändström, to travel to Sweden.

From Kronstadt twelve-year-old Princess Vera escaped to Sweden aboard the Swedish vessel Ångermanland in October 1918 with her mother, her brother George, and her young nephews (Prince Teymuraz Constantinovich and Prince Vsevolod Ivanovich of Russia) and nieces (Princess Natalia Konstantinovna Bagration-Mukhransky and Princess Catherine Ivanovna of Russia) when they were permitted by the Bolsheviks to be taken by ship to Sweden, via Tallinn to Helsinki and via Mariehamn to Stockholm, at the invitation of Queen Victoria of Sweden. At Stockholm harbor, they met Prince Gustaf Adolf, who took them to the royal palace. Later, Vsevolod and Catherine were able to reunite to their mother.

== Exile ==
On the sofa: Princess Tatiana with her children Teymuraz and Nathalie Bagration-Mukhransky and Grand Duchess Elizaveta Mavrikievna. On the floor: Prince George and Princess Vera. Brussels, 1921.

Princess Vera lived with her mother and her brother George for the next two years in Sweden, first in Stockholm and then in Saltsjöbaden. As Sweden proved too expensive to live in, Elizabeth Mavrikievna wrote a letter to Albert I of Belgium, asking him to allow them to move to his country. In 1920 they relocated to Brussels where they were frequently ill. In 1922, Vera's uncle, Duke Ernest II of Saxe-Altenburg invited them to move to Germany. Elizabeth Mavrikievna settled in the ancestral castle of her family near Leipzig, in the small town of Altenburg. Princess Vera followed her mother half a year later after spending sometime in Oberstdorf in the Allgäu region of the Bavarian Alps recuperating from tuberculosis.

Her mother died of cancer on 24 March 1927 in Leipzig. Left alone and without sufficient means of subsistence, Vera Constantinovna moved to Bavaria, with friends and shortly after relocated to London with her brother George. When two years later, George moved to the United States, she returned to Altenburg. Princess Vera lived there for thirty years. Prince George died in New York City in 1938. Princess Vera lived in Germany through the difficult years of World War II. During the War, she worked as a translator in a camp for prisoners of war. But German officials soon removed her from that position because she had tried to help the fellow prisoners.

For many years, as she later recalled, she was haunted by the events of the Revolution. "I used to have the same dream, as if I stood with my back to a pit and they were going to shoot me...my awakening was not less terrible than the dream itself, because I was constantly afraid to open my eyes and see that they had really come to take me to the execution".

At the end of World War II, in early 1945, American troops arrived in Altenburg. On hearing that, according to the Potsdam Conference, Altenburg was going to be part of the zone of Soviet occupation, Princess Vera fled on foot. With her cousin, Prince Ernst-Friedrich of Saxe-Altenburg, she had to walk 240 kilometers in 12 days, fleeing the advancing Soviet troops. Once safe, Princess Vera settled in Hamburg on 5 January 1946. Until 1949 she worked as a translator in the British branch of the Red Cross and later in the DP Medical Center. When this one was closed, she worked at the reception in another British institution. She belonged to no country, as she only had an ambiguous Nansen passport, which gave her the ability to travel but no protections of statehood. Despite this, she refused to take the protection offered to her by various European countries, considering herself Russian. " I didn't leave Russia", she once declared, "Russia left me".

== Last years ==
Princess Vera Constantinovna in the 1970s

In 1951 she moved to the United States, where her main activity was to work for the Tolstoy Foundation, which provided aid to Russians in need. For the next decades she lived in New York, and was very active in charities. In November 1952 Vera Constantinovna became involved in the work of the Russian Children's Welfare Society where she continued her work there until 1969. At the same time, she volunteered at the Fund of Assistance to the Russian Orthodox Church Outside Russia. She retired in April 1971. She regarded some of the émigré community, and some of their pretensions, with skepticism. She did not have the nostalgic idyll of many émigrés, but rather the memories of her childhood and her lost family. The constant stream of visitors she regarded with some amusement and found rather trying. She did not care for those who would speak in awe-struck tones of the late Imperial family; she would often relate stories of their humanness and misbehavior. For her, the children of the last Tsar remained her childhood playmates, not distant figures for adoration. She also regarded the canonization of the Romanovs, including her brothers and uncle, as a puzzling, peculiar move by the Church. Princess Vera wrote four short articles about her life for a magazine "Kadetskaya pereklichka" published by Union of the Russian Kadets in New York in 1972.

Princess Vera retained a certain aura of living history, being the last surviving member of the Romanov family who could remember Imperial Russia. Her two brothers and sister who managed to escape Russia all predeceased her. Prince Gabriel died in 1955, leaving no heirs, as did her brother Prince George, the victim of an early death at the age of 33 in 1938. Her sister, Princess Tatiana, eventually took holy orders and became an Orthodox Nun. She died in Jerusalem in 1979.

Princess Vera died at the Tolstoy Foundation's elderly care home in Valley Cottage, New York, on 11 January 2001, at the age of 94. She was buried next to her brother Prince Georgy Konstantinovich at the cemetery of the Russian Orthodox Monastery of Novo-Diveevo in Nanuet, New York. Of all the members of the Romanov family in Imperial Russia, only her niece Princess Catherine Ivanovna outlived her. Princess Vera never married and left no children. In the spring of 2007 the Pavlovsk Palace, where she was born, held an exhibit about her and her family, commemorating what would have been her 101st birthday.

== Honours ==
- (Russian Empire) House of Romanov: Imperial Order of Saint Catherine, 1st Class

== Archives ==
Vera Constantinovna's personal papers (including correspondence and photographs) are preserved in the "Romanov Family Papers" collection in the Hoover Institution Archives (Stanford, California, USA).

== Ancestors ==
Ancestors of Princess Vera Constantinovna of Russia

8. Emperor Nicholas I of Russia
4. Grand Duke Konstantin Nikolayevich of Russia
9. Princess Charlotte of Prussia
2. Grand Duke Konstantin Konstantinovich of Russia
10. Joseph, Duke of Saxe-Altenburg
5. Princess Alexandra of Saxe-Altenburg
11. Duchess Amelia of Württemberg
1. Princess Vera Constantinovna of Russia
12. George, Duke of Saxe-Altenburg
6. Prince Moritz of Saxe-Altenburg
13. Princess Marie of Mecklenburg-Schwerin
3. Princess Elisabeth of Saxe-Altenburg
14. Bernhard II, Duke of Saxe-Meiningen
7. Princess Augusta of Saxe-Meiningen
15. Princess Marie Frederica of Hesse-Kassel

== Bibliography ==
- Zeepvat, Charlotte, The Camera and the Tsars, Sutton Publishing, 2004, ISBN 0-7509-3049-7.
- Exhibition Catalog, Princess Vera Konstantinovna. 100th birthday, Petronii, St Petersburg, 2007. (Russian)
- Princess Vera Constantinovna, Autobiographical articles Kadetskaya pereklichka. Кадетская перекличка No. 3 New York, 1972. (Russian)
