= Prince Gabriel Constantinovich of Russia =

Russian prince

Prince Gabriel Constantinovich
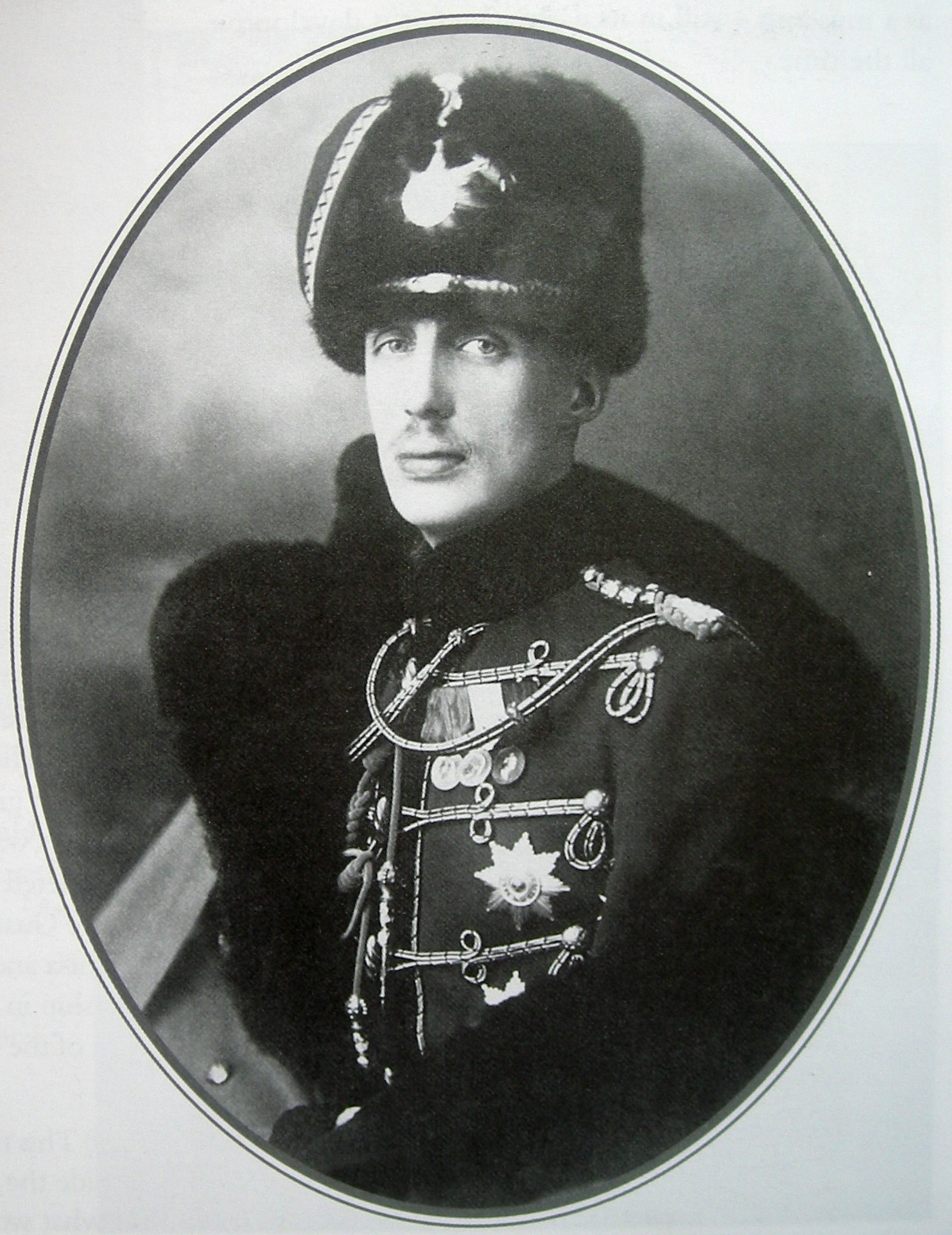
- Gabriel in the uniform of His Majesty’s Life Guards Hussar Regiment, 1912.
- Born: 15 July 1887; Pavlovsk Palace, Pavlovsk, Saint Petersburg, Russian Empire
- Died: 28 February 1955 (aged 67); Paris, France
- Burial: Sainte-Geneviève-des-Bois Russian Cemetery
- Spouse: Antonina Rafailovna Nesterovskaya (m. 1917; died 1950) Princess Irina Ivanovna Kurakina (m. 1951)
- House: Holstein-Gottorp Romanov
- Father: Grand Duke Konstantin Konstantinovich of Russia
- Mother: Princess Elisabeth of Saxe-Altenburg

Prince Gabriel Constantinovich of Russia (Russian: Гавриил Константинович; 15 July 1887 – 28 February 1955) was the second son of Grand Duke Konstantin Konstantinovich of Russia and his wife, Grand Duchess Elizabeth Mavrikievna of Russia. A great-grandson of Tsar Nicholas I, he was born in Imperial Russia and served in the army during World War I. He lost much of his family during the war and the Russian Revolution. He narrowly escaped execution by the Bolsheviks and spent the rest of his life living in exile in France.

== Early life ==
Prince Gabriel Constantinovich was born on 15 July 1887 at Pavlovsk Palace in Pavlovsk. He was the second son among the nine children of Grand Duke Konstantin Konstantinovich of Russia and his wife Grand Duchess Elizaveta Mavrikievna of Russia) (born Princess Elisabeth of Saxe-Altenburg).

Gabriel and his brother Prince Ivan, born a year earlier, were the first to suffer the effects of the reforms of Emperor Alexander III, his father's cousin, who decreed that in the name of economizing the state budget, only the children and grandchildren of the reigning sovereign would bear the title of grand duke. Gabriel was three days old when Tsar Alexander III issued a manifesto announcing his title as a Prince of the Imperial Blood with the style of Highness. Grand dukes received 280,000 gold rubles annually from the imperial treasury, which guaranteed a comfortable life. Gabriel was given a one-time sum of 1 million gold rubles, and he could count on nothing else.

Gabriel spent his early life living in fabulous splendor in the last period of Imperial Russia. His father, a respected poet, was a first cousin once removed of Tsar Nicholas II, and one of the wealthiest members of the Romanov family. As a child, Gabriel was frail and of poor health; he was pale and prone to illness. He and Ivan were both often sick and together spent more than a year of their childhood living at Oreanda in the Crimea, with a doctor and several servants. Their health improved in the temperate climate, and the boys enjoyed their time spent on the beaches and in short tours around the peninsula. With only each other, for company, they forged a strong sibling relationship that was to last to the ends of their lives.

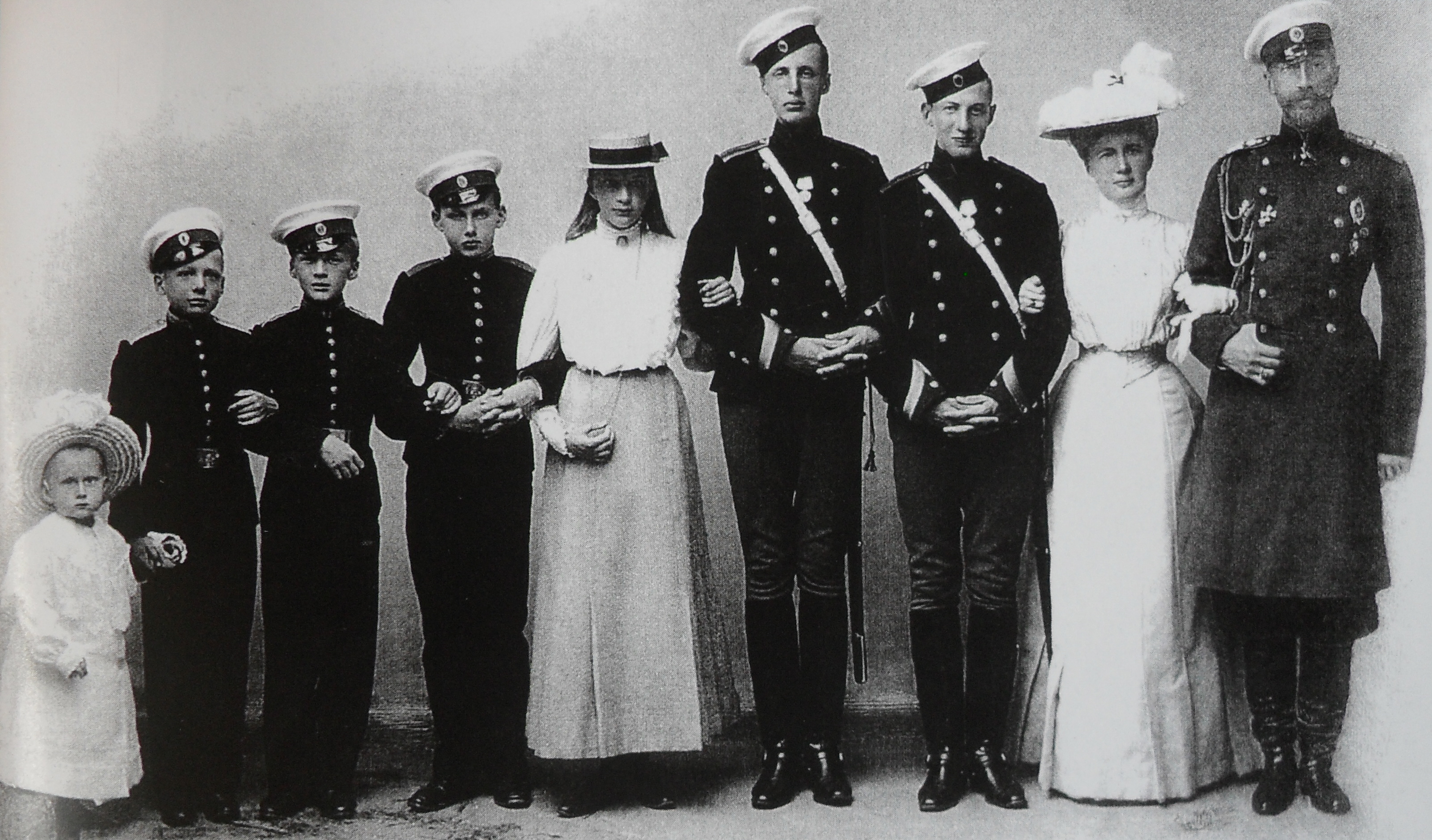
Prince Gabriel Constantinovich with his family. From left to right; Prince George, Prince Igor, Prince Oleg, Prince Constantine, Princess Tatiana, Prince Gabriel, Prince Ioan, Grand Duchess Elisabeth Mavrikievna and Grand Duke Konstantin, 1905

Gabriel was brought up strictly; he and his siblings were taught to speak pure Russian without a mixture of foreign phrases, and they had to memorize prayers. The best writers and musicians were invited to Pavlovsk and the Marble Palace, and Grand Duke Konstantin devised a programme of lectures for his children, providing a good education for them.

From a very early age, Gabriel was passionately devoted to his father and to all things military. Following his father's example, Gabriel Constantinovich chose a military career, traditional for the male members of the Romanov family. In his memoirs, he recalled: Since the age of seven, I dreamed of entering the Nikolaevsky Cavalry School < Nicholas Cavalry College>. In 1900, he was allowed to join the 1st Moscow Cadet corps as preparatory training; in 1903 he finally received permission to join the Nikolaevsky school. "Having worn a cadet's uniform for five years," he wrote, "at last my dream came true, and I became a real military man." At 19, he was promoted to officer's rank and awarded several orders. On 19 January 1908 Gabriel Constantinovich took his oath of allegiance to Nicholas II in a ceremony held in the church of the Catherine Palace at Tsarskoye Selo.

His family was close to Nicholas II, and he spent many times with the emperor and his family. Grand Duchess Maria Pavlovna and her brother, Grand Duke Dimitri Pavlovich, were often his playmates.

== A Russian prince ==
Prince Gabriel Constantinovich in his youth

Unlike his serious and reserved brothers, Gabriel was much more social, and began to associate with an aristocratic crowd considered fast by the standards of the day. In August 1911, during a small ball at the mansion of the famous ballerina Mathilde Kschessinskaya, Gabriel met Antonina Rafailovna Nesterovskaya (14 March 1890 – 7 March 1950), a 21-year-old dancer and member of an impoverished family from the lesser nobility. Gabriel was 24 years old, very tall and thin. Nesterovskaya was nearly a foot shorter than he was, plain and plump, but she was witty and lively.

Gabriel fell in love with the ballerina. He managed to speak to her during the intervals while she was dancing at the Mariinsky Theatre every Sunday. By January 1912, he was visiting Nesterovskaya in the little apartment where she lived with her mother. They became lovers and before Easter 1912, they joined Kschessinskaya and her lover Grand Duke Andrew Vladimirovich on a trip to the Riviera, staying in Cannes and Monte Carlo. The Riviera idyll did not last long, because they soon had to return to Saint Petersburg, where the prince was studying. From then on, he considered her as his fiancée. In 1913, he asked her to quit the Ballet Corps and she agreed.

Gabriel was devoted to his mistress and installed her in an extravagant house he purchased for her on Kamennoostrovsky Prospekt in Saint Petersburg. Meanwhile, Gabriel, who had been living in the Pavlovsk Palace, received a large three-room apartment at the Marble Palace on the second floor looking on the Palace Banks. After the death of his father in 1915, Gabriel was increasingly involved with his mistress. They were a hospitable couple and kept an open house entertaining lavishly for their friends.

Gabriel was devotedly in love, but he could not marry his mistress because the Romanov's family status forbade any morganatic union. He appealed to his aunt, Olga, Queen of the Hellenes, to intercede on his behalf, and she went to see Nicholas II requesting permission for his nephew to marry, but the emperor flatly refused. Through the twists and turns of the years that followed, Prince Gabriel remained passionate in his devotion to the dancer, determined that one day he would overcome the obstacles and marry her. He was awarded Serbian Order of Karađorđe's Star in 1911.

== War and revolution ==
Prince Gabriel Constantinovich in uniform

At the outbreak of World War I, Gabriel had to be separated from his mistress. He and four of his brothers joined the active Russian army in the military effort, fighting in advance operations. His brother Prince Oleg was killed in action at the beginning of the war. The following year, Gabriel's father died of a heart attack. Evacuated to Petrograd in the fall of 1914, he joined the military academy, graduating at the age of 29 with the rank of colonel. His affair with Nesterovskaya continued openly and was discussed publicly. The two lived together for a long time, and in 1916 Empress Alexandra Feodorovna, seeing the sincerity of their feelings, decided to help them get married even though it was considered a misalliance.

After the overthrow of the Russian monarchy in the February Revolution of 1917, Prince Gabriel asked his mother for permission to marry Antonina Nesterovskaya, but she did not give him her consent. He decided to disobey, and on 9 April 1917 at three o'clock pm in a little church, they married. A morganatic union would have never been allowed under the reign of Nicholas II and Gabriel kept his marriage secret from both his mother and his uncle Dimitri Konstantinovich, who only later learned of the wedding.

Gabriel had asked his cousin Prince Alexander of Leuchtenberg (who himself intended to marry morganatically), to find a priest to bless the wedding secretly. At the wedding ceremony, only Lidia Chistyakova (Antonina's sister) and a few of their friends were present. Gabriel had told his secret to his brother Ivan a few days before, but his elder brother did not want to attend the ceremony because of their mother. However, he promised to keep the secret. On his way to the church, Gabriel saw his brothers Prince Constantine and Prince Georgy walking on Morskaya Street. They had just met Antonina in a wedding dress in another car. Only later, the two brothers realized what had happened. Once married, Gabriel went to see his mother who, although she was very upset, at the end gave him her blessing. From then on Gabriel moved into Nesteroskaya's apartment where for a time, the couple lived quietly.

Gabriel tried to keep a low profile in Petrograd during the spring 1917. Fearing a vengeful mob, Antonina telephoned to warn him. She dispatched a car and driver to collect him from the Military Academy and spirit him to the relative safety of her house.

== Captivity ==
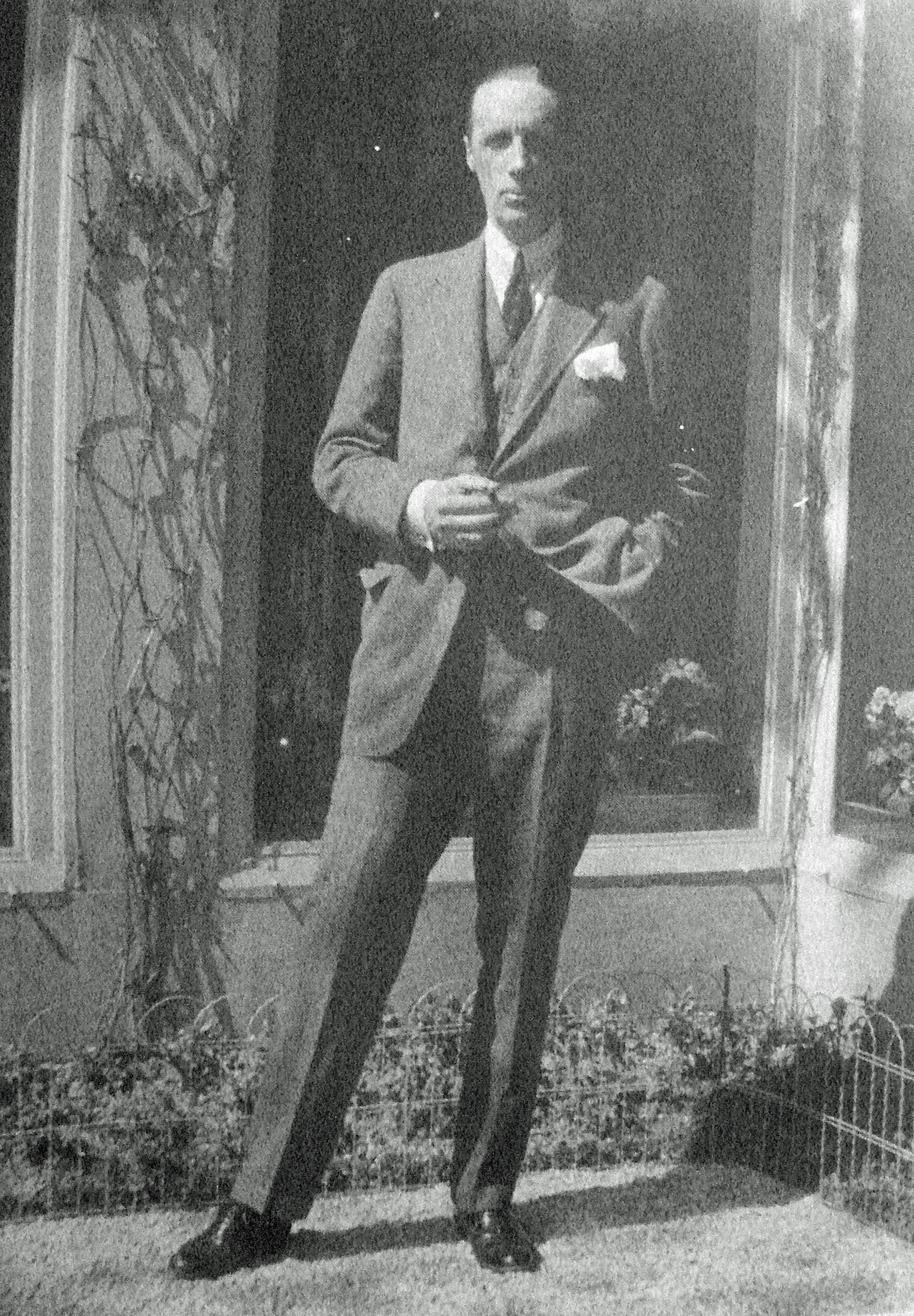
Prince Gabriel Constantinovich in civilian clothes

After the successful Bolshevik coup of November 1917, the Petrograd newspapers published a decree summoning all male Romanovs to report to the Cheka, the secret police. Initially they were just required not to leave the city. In March 1918, the Romanovs who registered were summoned again, now to be sent away into internal Russian exile. In the spring of 1918, when the Bolsheviks had initially tried to arrest him, Gabriel was suffering from tuberculosis; rather than imprison him, the Bolsheviks allowed him to stay with his wife, Antonina, at her Petrograd apartment. By the summer of 1918, however, he had recovered, and one day in July, a contingent of armed soldiers arrived at the modest apartment and took him into custody. He was put in Shpalernaya prison in a cell adjoining those of his uncle Dimitri Konstantinovich and Grand Dukes Nicholas Mikhailovich and George Mikhailovich.

Gabriel, younger and more resilient than his relatives, found prison less of an ordeal, but he was shocked at his uncle's appearance when they were first reunited. Until the last, Gabriel recalled, Dimitri was the cheerful favorite uncle of his childhood, telling him jokes, attempting to raise the spirits, and bribing prison guards to carry hopeful messages to his nephew's cell. Throughout Gabriel's incarceration Antonina was tireless in her efforts to obtain her husband's release. She finally succeeded with the intervention of Maxim Gorky, who lobbied Vladimir Lenin on Gabriel's behalf, as Gorky's wife was among Antonina's friends. Near the end of 1918, Gabriel was moved to a hospital. Shortly after, Gorky took the couple under his own roof; they lived for a while in his apartment in Petrograd. A few weeks later, again with Gorky's assistance, the Petrograd Soviet gave the couple permission to leave Russia for Finland. They hurriedly left Russia and made their roundabout way to France. The prince's release came just in time. In the early hours of 28 January 1919, his relatives at Shpalernaya prison were executed by firing squad at the walls of the Peter and Paul Fortress.

== Exile ==
Prince Gabriel Constantinovich of Russia with his wife Antonina Nesterovskaya, created Princess Romanovskaya-Strelninskaya in exile

In 1920, Prince Gabriel and his wife took residence in Paris, where many members of the Russian nobility settled. The couple did not lose interest in society once they were in exile. They were constant attendees at many Russian balls, frequently enjoyed evenings out in Russian nightclubs, and continued their friendship with other Romanovs in exile. Their circle included the renowned Polish artist Tamara de Lempicka, who painted a famous portrait of Gabriel in 1927.

By 1924, Gabriel's economic situation was very difficult. Antonina, having considered then rejected the idea of opening a ballet school, instead turned to the world of couture, and established her own fashion house. Christened the House of Berry, the shop opened in a small building. Five years later after achieving some measure of success, Antonina was able to move the shop to a more fashionable location. When Antonina received important or wealthy clients, especially American millionaires, they were quickly whisked to a salon where, surrounded by the trappings of imperial Russia, they were entertained by Gabriel Constantinovich himself, who seemed to relish the experience. Visitors later recalled that the prince frequently spent hours with them, often lecturing them on members of the extended family and using his photographs and paintings as visual aids to a vanished era. Gabriel and his wife, with the proceeds from their successful couture business, lived a comfortable, if not splendid life.

Their entire hallways in their apartment were filled with family photographs. They lived happily and often had tea parties. In Paris, they often mingled with other Russian émigrés, including Prince Felix Yussupov, and his wife, Princess Irina Alexandrovna, and Grand Duke Andrew Vladimirovich, by then married to Mathilde Kschessinskaya.

The Great Depression eventually marked a sharp turn in the fortune of their fashion business, and they had to close the shop in 1936. The couple lived very modestly in a Paris suburb, where Prince Gabriel wrote his memoirs. To earn money he organized bridge parties and his wife occasionally gave ballet lessons. A portion of Prince Gabriel's memoirs was in 1955 in New York (Chekhov Publishing House) published as In the Marble Palace; the book appeared first in both Russian and French. A number of Russian editions have appeared over the years, the most recent in 2005 (Moscow: "Zakharov"). However, it took time for the memoirs to be published in English, because a first English translation was allegedly lost in the bombing of the American Embassy in Beirut, Lebanon, in 1984. Gabriel's memoirs provide a detailed account of the private day-to-day lives of members of the Romanov family and have been sourced for many contemporary biographies on the Russian Imperial family. The complete, authorized typescript of the memoirs is held at the Hoover Institution Library & Archives. The manuscript is approximately four times the length of the 1955 published version. It has now been partially published in 2025 (covering the author's narrative up to 1897).

== Last years ==
Gabriel Constantinovich kept in touch with his Romanov relatives during his long years in exile. He recognized Grand Duke Kirill Vladimirovich of Russia as Head of the Imperial House, and applied to Kirill for a title for his wife, to whom was granted the style of Her Serene Highness, Princess Romanovskaya-Strelninskaya. Gabriel himself was awarded the style of Grand Duke by Kirill's son Vladimir Kirillovich on 15 May 1939. He was the only Romanov prince to be elevated to this style.

During the tumultuous years of World War II, Gabriel continued to live in Paris with his wife. The relationship between them never wavered, and they remained devoted to each other. His wife died on 7 March 1950 at the age of 60. Gabriel remarried the following year, on 11 May 1951. His second wife was Princess Irina Ivanovna Kurakina (22 September 1903 – 17 January 1993), a 48-year-old exiled Russian princess who was created Her Serene Highness Princess Romanovskaya by Grand Duke Vladimir Kirillovich. Gabriel died four years later on 28 February 1955 in Paris. He had no children by either marriage and was buried in the Sainte-Geneviève-des-Bois Russian Cemetery.

== Ancestors ==
Ancestors of Prince Gabriel Constantinovich of Russia

8. Nicholas I of Russia
4. Grand Duke Constantine Nikolaevich of Russia
9. Princess Charlotte of Prussia
2. Grand Duke Constantine Constantinovich of Russia
10. Joseph, Duke of Saxe-Altenburg
5. Princess Alexandra of Saxe-Altenburg
11. Duchess Amelia of Württemberg
1. Prince Gabriel Constantinovich of Russia
12. George, Duke of Saxe-Altenburg
6. Prince Moritz of Saxe-Altenburg
13. Duchess Marie Louise of Mecklenburg-Schwerin
3. Princess Elisabeth of Saxe-Altenburg
14. Bernhard II, Duke of Saxe-Meiningen
7. Princess Augusta of Saxe-Meiningen
15. Princess Marie Frederica of Hesse-Kassel

== Bibliography ==
- Cockfield, Jamie H. (2002). White Crow. Praeger. ISBN 0-275-97778-1.
- Grand Duke Gabriel Constantinovich (2009). Memories in the Marble Palace. Gilbert's Books. ISBN 978-0-9737839-9-5.
- King, Greg; Wilson, Penny (2006). Gilded Prism: The Konstantinovichi Grand Dukes & the Last Years of the Romanov Dynasty. Eurohistory. ISBN 0-9771961-4-3.
- Vassiliev, Alexandre (2001). Beauty in Exile. Harry N. Abrams. ISBN 0-8109-5701-9.
- Zeepvat, Charlotte (2004). The Camera and the Tsars. Sutton Publishing. ISBN 0-7509-3049-7.
- Zeepvat, Charlotte (2000). Romanov Autumn. Sutton Publishing. ISBN 0-7509-2739-9.
