= Georgy Safarov =

Bolshevik revolutionary (1891–1942)

Georgy Safarov Георгий Сафаров
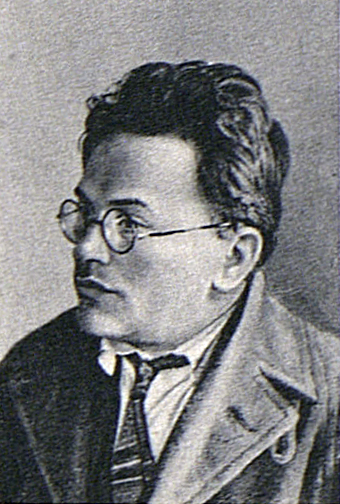
- Born: 1891; Saint Petersburg, Russian Empire
- Died: 27 July 1942 (aged 50–51); Saratov, Russian SFSR, Soviet Union
- Cause of death: Execution by shooting
- Political party: RSDLP (Bolsheviks) (1908–1918); Russian Communist Party (1918–1927, 1928–1934)

Georgy Ivanovich Safarov (Russian: Георгий Иванович Сафа́ров) (1891 – 27 July 1942) was a Bolshevik revolutionary and politician who was a participant in the Russian Revolution, the Russian Civil War, and in the executions of the Romanovs in Yekaterinburg and Alapayevsk.

He was later arrested for his association with the left opposition and served as an NKVD informant in prison. In spite of giving fabricated evidence against over a hundred of his former comrades, he was executed on 27 July 1942. He is one of only a few victims of Joseph Stalin's purges not posthumously rehabilitated or reinstated to the party after his death when the history of the 1930s was re-examined in the 1980s.

== Early life ==
Safarov was born in Saint Petersburg in 1891. His father, an architect, was Armenian and his mother was Polish, but he described himself as Russian. He joined the Russian Social Democratic Labour Party in 1908, and sided with the Bolshevik faction led by Vladimir Lenin. Arrested in 1910, he was exiled to north Russia, emigrated to Switzerland and worked as party secretary in the Zürich Region.

In 1912, he returned to St Petersburg, with Inessa Armand, to revive the Bolshevik organisation in the capital and assist in getting a Bolshevik factory worker, Alexei Badayev elected to the State Duma (Russian Empire). The election campaign was a success, but during the course of it, in September 1912, Safarov and Armand were arrested. After his release, in 1914, he returned to Switzerland. In April 1915, he and Inessa Armand represented the Bolsheviks at the International Socialist Youth Conference in Berne. He then moved to France, where he worked in the St Nazaire shipyards, until January 1916, when he was expelled from France for conducting anti-war propaganda. He returned to Switzerland.

Following the February Revolution, Georgy Safarov was one of the 31 individuals who accompanied Lenin in a sealed train under German supervision to Petrograd, along with other notable communist figures including Grigory Zinoviev, Karl Radek, Inessa Armand, and Lenin's wife, Nadezhda Krupskaya. He was a member of the Military Revolutionary Committee, which also included members such as Joseph Stalin, Andrei Bubnov, Moisei Uritsky, Felix Dzerzhinsky, and Yakov Sverdlov, and took part in the October Revolution.

Following the Bolshevik seizure of power and the outbreak of the Russian Civil War, Safarov backed the Left Communists who opposed the Treaty of Brest-Litovsk, wanting to conduct a 'revolutionary war'; against Germany, and backed the Military Opposition, who opposed the recruitment to the Red Army of former officers of the Imperial Army. He was appointed a member of the Presidium of the Ural Regional Committee of the Russian Communist Party (Bolshevik), also popularly referred to as the Ural Soviet, and worked as editor-in-chief of the party's regional newspaper, the Ural Worker, and served on the editorial board of Pravda, the party's official state newspaper.

== The Killing of the Romanovs ==
On 29 June 1918, Safarov, as a member of the Presidium of the Ural Regional Soviet under Alexander Beloborodov, was a party to the unanimous decision to execute the Romanovs imprisoned in Yekaterinburg, who included the deposed Emperor Nicholas II, his wife Empress Alexandra, and their five children Olga, Tatiana, Maria, Anastasia, and Alexei. Safarov was a signatory to the resolution on the shooting, and sent a final telegram to Yakov Sverdlov in Moscow along with Filipp Goloshchekin seeking final approval. Yakov Yurovsky, the chief executioner, later recorded that a signed response from Sverdlov had been passed to him by Goloshchekin around 7:00 pm on 16 July. He later assisted in the procurement of materials for the disposal of the remains, and the confiscation of the Romanov's property by the state.

On 18 July, a day after the killings of the Romanovs in Yekaterinburg, Safarov traveled to nearby Alapayevsk as a representative of the Ural Soviet to direct the killings of a number of Romanov extended relations and their companions, including Alexandra's sister Princess Elisabeth of Hesse and by Rhine, Prince Ioann Konstantinovich, Prince Igor Konstantinovich, Prince Konstantine Konstantinovich, Grand Duke Sergey Mikhaylovich, and Prince Vladimir Pavlovich Paley, as well as Elisabeth's trusted friend and companion Sister Varvara Yakovleva, and Fyodor Remez, Grand Duke Sergey's personal secretary. He was safely evacuated from the Ural Region along with most of the other members of the Ural Soviet prior to the arrival of the White Army, who captured Yekaterinburg on 25 July.

== Later career ==
In November 1919, Safarov was sent to Turkestan to take part in the suppression of the White Movement and the Basmachi there and the establishment of Soviet power in the region, and was a member of the Turkburo of the Central Committee of the RCP (b) from 1920 until 1922. He sponsored the creation of committees of poor peasants, and the redistribution of land to Moslem farmers, and for that reason, he opposed the introduction of the New Economic Policy in Turkestan, claiming that it would advantage the comparatively wealthy Russian farmers. This brought him into a conflict with the new head of the Turkestan bureau, Mikhail Tomsky, which became so serious that the Poltiburo sent two senior Bolsheviks Adolf Ioffe, and Grigory Sokolnikov to investigate. When Safarov threatened to resign, in December 1921, Lenin – who was generally on Safarov's side, suspecting that Tomsky was guilty of Russian chauvinism, wrote to him saying "you are not a 14-year-old girl."

In July 1920, Safarov was also appointed a member of the Far Eastern Bureau of Comintern, in Tashkent. In March 1921, he was elected a candidate member of the Central Committee. In 1922, he was withdrawn from Turkestan appointed a member of the Executive Committee of Comintern, and head of its Middle East and Far East sections.

== In opposition ==
Safarov was a political ally of Grigory Zinoviev, who was Chairman of Comintern and head of the communist party in Petrograd (St Petersburg). In 1924, Zinoviev appointed him editor of Petrogrdskaya Pravda, which soon afterwards was renamed Leningradskaya Pravda, when St Petersburg became 'Leningrad'. In November, he wrote a tirade against Zinoviev's rival, Leon Trotsky, entitled Trotskyism or Leninism?, which ran across seven issues of Leningradskaya Pravda. But when a rift opened up between Zinoviev and Joseph Stalin, Safarov backed Zinoviev's faction, and angered Moscow communists by boastfully declaring that Leningrad workers were "the salt of the proletarian earth, who have carried on their shoulders the burden of three great revolutions." In December 1925, he lost his position on the Central Committee. In 1926, he joined the short-lived United Opposition an alliance that joined the Zinoviev faction to Trotsky and the Left Opposition.

In the 1920s, it was a common practice to dispatch members of opposition groups – such as Alexandra Kollontai and Christian Rakovsky – away on diplomatic missions. In May 1926, Safarov was appointed First Secretary of the Plenipotentiary Office in the Republic of China and in 1927, was appointed to the Trade Mission of the Soviet Union in Turkey. On 18 December 1927, he was expelled from the CPSU, and then arrested and sentenced to 4 years of exile in Achinsk.

Almost immediately after the expulsions in December 1927, Zinoviev recanted, submitted to Stalin's leadership and wrote to his supporters to do the same. Safarov was one of the few to refuse at first, but recanted after a year and after filing an application for his withdrawal from the opposition on 9 November 1928, he was restored to the CPSU. In 1929–34, he worked for the Eastern Department of Comintern.

On an unknown date, he joined a secret opposition group with a Bolshevik named Tarkhanov, which not much is known about. A letter of Lev Sedov written by the end of 1932 said this group would be one of those willing to join a clandestine political bloc with followers of Leon Trotsky: "The Safar–Tarkhan Group have not yet formally entered they have too extreme a position; they will enter very soon." Trotsky's letters defined the bloc as a force to fight Stalinist repression. Trotskyist historian Pierre Broué said the bloc dissolved in early 1933, because some of its members were arrested.

== Arrest and execution ==
On 25 December 1934, after the assassination of Sergey Kirov, he was again arrested as part of a series of mass arrests which came to be described as the "Kirov stream". On 16 January 1935, he was again sentenced to 2 years of exile in the so-called "Case of the Leningrad Counter-Revolutionary Zinoviev group of Safarov, Zalutsky, and others" and again deported to Achinsk. During the first of the Moscow Show Trials, in August 1936, in which Zinoviev and other defendants 'confessed' to terrorism and other imaginary crimes, Safarov was named as a fellow conspirator, but not brought to trial. On 16 December 1936, he was arrested in Achinsk and sentenced to 5 years in prison on charges of "Counter-Revolutionary Trotskyist activities", and was sent to Vorkuta on 15 January 1937.

Almost every other former member of the Zinoviev opposition group was executed during the Great Purge, but Safarov survived by co-operating with the NKVD and denouncing others, but was sentenced to death by a decree of a Special Collegium of the NKVD on 16 July 1942 following the German Invasion of the Soviet Union, ironically on the same day Safarov had signed the death warrant for the Romanovs 24 years prior. He was executed on 27 July 1942 in Saratov and was consigned to an unmarked grave.

Safarov was the only individual convicted in the case of the Leningrad Counter-Revolutionary Zinoviev Group who was not posthumously rehabilitated by the Military Collegium of the Supreme Court of the USSR in the years following Stalin's death, as the court concluded that "Safarov G.I., given his provocative activities after his arrest, is not advisable to rehabilitate". The certificate of the case prepared on 16 October 1961 by the responsible controller of the CPC at the Central Committee of the CPSU and the Military Prosecutor of the Chief Military Prosecutor's Office noted:

"It is especially necessary to dwell on the testimony of Safarov. At repeated interrogations during the preliminary investigation in the present case, Safarov named 111 people, Zinoviev, Kamenev, and many other former opposition participants, as well as persons whom Safarov independently attributed participation in the opposition. Without citing specific facts that could be used as a basis for accusing the persons named in anti-Soviet activities, Safarov attributed to them the holding of such and each of them a negative political characteristic. Subsequently, in 1938–1940, during his time in prison, Safarov was used as a witness and a provocateur on the instructions of state security personnel, and also, on his own initiative, gave testimony to numerous individuals. Safarov reported in a statement dated 10 September 1941 to Vsevolod Merkulov, that for more than two years he has been "rigorously fulfilling the tasks of the investigative unit for combating enemies of the people". In another statement addressed to Lavrentiy Beria he insisted that he could still be "something of great use to the NKVD" and requested that Beria resume issuing him additional funds and supplies.

Safarov was formally rehabilitated in 1991.

== Works ==
- Obshchestvo i gosudarstvo [Society and the State]. Petrograd: Gosizdat, 1919.
- Burzhuaznyi poriadok i kommunisticheskaia revoliutsiia: Evoliutsiia burzhuaznogo prava i gosudarstva i kommunisticheskaia revoliutsiia [Bourgeois Order and Communist Revolution: The Evolution of Bourgeois Law and the State and Communist Revolution]. Petrograd: Gosizdat, 1919.
- "The Colonial Revolution: The Experience of Turkestan," Communist International, whole no. 14 (1920), col. 2759–2768.
- "The East and the Revolution," Communist International, whole no. 15 (1920), col. 3128–3139.
- O nauchnykh osnovakh kommunizma [On the Scientific Foundations of Communism]. Petrograd: Gosizdat, 1921.
- Kolonial'naia revoiutsiia: Opyt Turkestana [Colonial Revolution: The Experience of Turkestan]. Petrograd: Gosizdat, 1921.
- Natsional'nyi vopros i proletariat [The National Question and the Proletariat]. Petrograd: Gosizdat, 1922.
- Problemy Vostoka [Problems of the East]. Petrograd: Gosizdat, 1922.
- Taktika bol'shevizma: Osnovnye etapy razvitiia taktiki RKP: Konspektivnyi ocherk [Bolshevism Tactics: The Main Stages of the Development of the RCP's Tactics: A Summary]. Petrograd: Priboy, 1923.
- Osnovy leninizma [Foundations of Leninism]. Leningrad: Priboy, 1924. (Four editions through 1925.)
- Teoriia permanentnoi revoliutsii i Trotskizm [The Theory of Permanent Revolution and Trotskyism]. Leningrad: Priboy, 1924.
- Trotskizm ili leninizm? [Trotskyism or Leninism?]. Leningrad: Priboy, 1924. (Reissued 2026)
- O leninskom vospitanii molodezhi [The Leninist Upbringing of Youth]. Leningrad: Priboy, 1924.
- Leninizm i mezhdunarodnye puti Oktiabria [Leninism and the International Paths of October]. Leningrad: Priboy, 1924.
- Trotskii o Lenine i leninizme: Sbornik materialov [Trotsky on Lenin and Leninism: A Collection of Material]. (editor) Leningrad: Priboy, 1925.
- Krest'ianskii vopros i leninizm [The Peasant Question and Leninism]. Leningrad: Priboy, 1925.
- Leninizm kak teoriia razvitiia proletarskoi revoliutsii [Leninism as the theory of development of the proletarian revolution]. Leningrad: Priboy, 1925.
- Leninskaia teoriia imperializma [The Leninist Theory of Imperialism]. Leningrad: Priboy, 1925.
- Eshche o gosudarstvenno kapitalizm i sotsializm [More on State Capitalism and Socialism]. With P. Zalutskii. Leningrad: Priboy, 1926.
- Klassy i klassovaia bor'ba v kitaiskoi istorii [Classes and Class Struggle in Chinese History]. Moscow: Gosizdat, 1928.
- Sel'skokhoziaistvennaia ekonomiia i sotsialisticheskaiia rekonstruktsiia [Agricultural economics and Socialist Reconstruction]. Moscow: Gosizdat, 1931.
- Problemy natsional'no-kolonial'noi revoliutsii [Problems of National–Colonial Revolution]. Moscow: Gosudarstvennoe sotisal'no-ekonomicheskoe izdatel'stvo, 1931.
- "The Betrayal by the National Congress and the Revolutionary Upsurge in India," Communist International, (1931), no. 8, pp. 23–31.
- Kolonial'naia revoliutsiia na sovermennom etape [Colonial Revolution in the Contemporary Period]. Moscow?: 1932.
- Ocherki po istorii Kitaia [Essays on the History of China]. Leningrad: Gosudarstvennoe sotisal'no-ekonomicheskoe izdatel'stvo, 1933.
- Iaponiia: Politiko–ekonomicheskii ocherk [Japan: A Politico-Economic Study]. Moscow: Partizdat, 1933.
- Ekonomicheskoe razvitie Iaponii [Economic Development of Japan]. Moscow: Gosudarstvennoe sotisal'no-ekonomicheskoe izdatel'stvo, 1934.
- Marks o natsional'no-kolonial'nom voprose [Marx on the National-Colonial Question]. Moscow: Partizdat, 1934.
- Marx and the East. New York: Workers Library Publishers, 1934.
- The Far East Ablaze. New York: Workers Library Publishers, 1935.
