= Grand Duke Sergei Mikhailovich of Russia =

Russian royal (1869–1918)

Grand Duke Sergei Mikhailovich
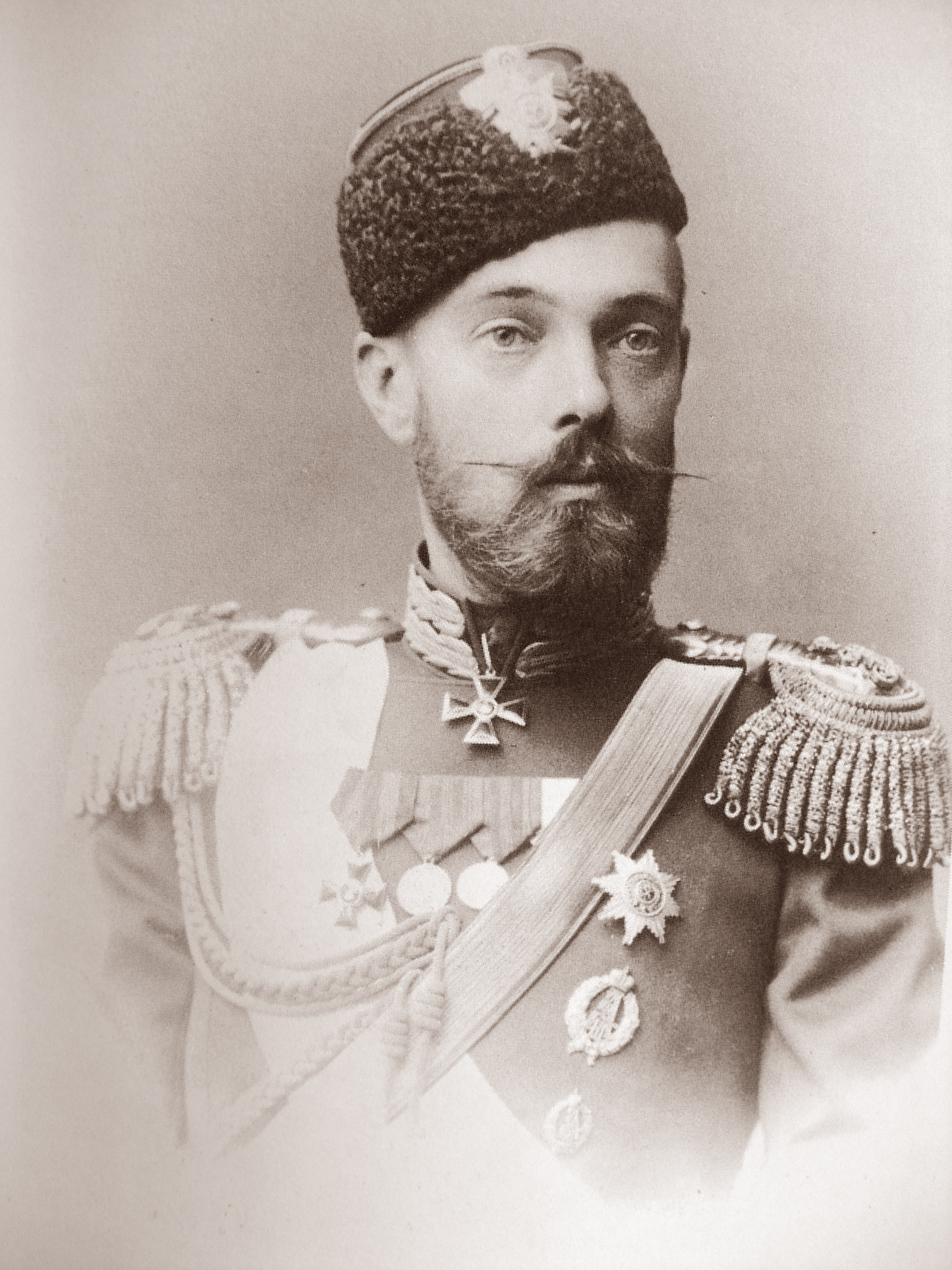
- Sergei, circa 1904 to 1911
- Born: 7 October 1869; Borjomi, Tiflis Governorate, Russian Empire
- Died: 18 July 1918 (aged 48); Alapayevsk, Russian Soviet Federative Socialist Republic
- Cause of death: Murder
- House: Holstein-Gottorp-Romanov
- Father: Grand Duke Michael Nikolaevich of Russia
- Mother: Princess Cecilie of Baden

Grand Duke Sergei Mikhailovich of Russia (Russian: Серге́й Миха́йлович; 7 October 1869 – 18 July 1918) was the fifth son and sixth child of Grand Duke Michael Nikolaievich of Russia and a first cousin of Alexander III of Russia.

He was born and raised in the Caucasus, where his father was viceroy. In 1881 the family moved to Saint Petersburg. He became a close friend of the then Tsarevich Nicholas. They grew apart upon Nicholas II's marriage and accession to the throne. Grand Duke Sergei remained a bachelor living at his father's palace in the imperial capital. He had a long affair with the famous ballerina Mathilde Kschessinska, who had previously been the mistress of Nicholas II. She was also later involved with Grand Duke Andrei Vladimirovich. Sergei recognized Mathilde's son as his own and remained their protector until his death.

Following family tradition, Grand Duke Sergei pursued a military career. He served as General Inspector of the Artillery with the rank of Adjutant General. During World War I he was chief of the artillery department, a position he was forced to resign amid controversy. He was then appointed Field Inspector General of Artillery at Stavka. After the fall of the monarchy, he remained in the former Imperial capital keeping a low profile. With the ascension of the Bolsheviks to power, he was sent to internal Russian exile.

He was murdered by the Bolsheviks along with several other Romanov relatives and his personal secretary at Alapayevsk on 18 July 1918, one day after the murder of Tsar Nicholas II and his immediate family at Yekaterinburg.

== Early life ==
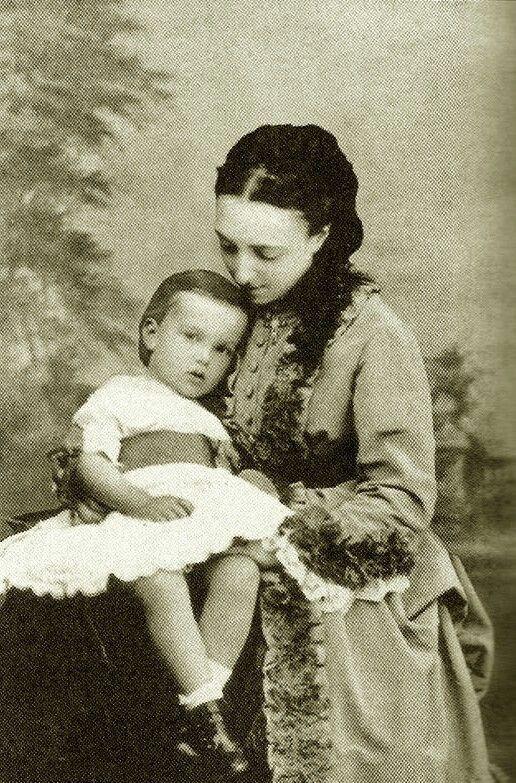
Sergei with his mother, 1870s

Grand Duke Sergei was born on 7 October [O.S. 25 September] 1869, at Borjomi, his father's 200,000 acres (810 km^{2}) estate 90 miles (140 km) from Tiflis. He was the fifth son and sixth child of the seven children of Grand Duke Michael Nicolaievich of Russia and his wife Grand Duchess Olga Feodorovna, born Princess Cecile of Baden. Named Sergei after St. Sergius of Radonezh, Grand Duke Sergei Mikhailovich spent his early years in the Caucasus, until 1881 when his family moved to Saint Petersburg. Raised in strict and militaristic environment, he received little affection from his parents. His father, occupied in military and governmental endeavors, remained a distant figure. His demanding mother was a strict disciplinarian and cold towards her children.

Like his brothers, Sergei Mikhailovich was destined from birth to follow a military career. He was two weeks old when he was enrolled in a military unit that was named after him: the 153rd Infantry Vakusnkii Regiment of HIH Grand Duke Sergei Mikhailovich.

== A Russian Grand Duke ==
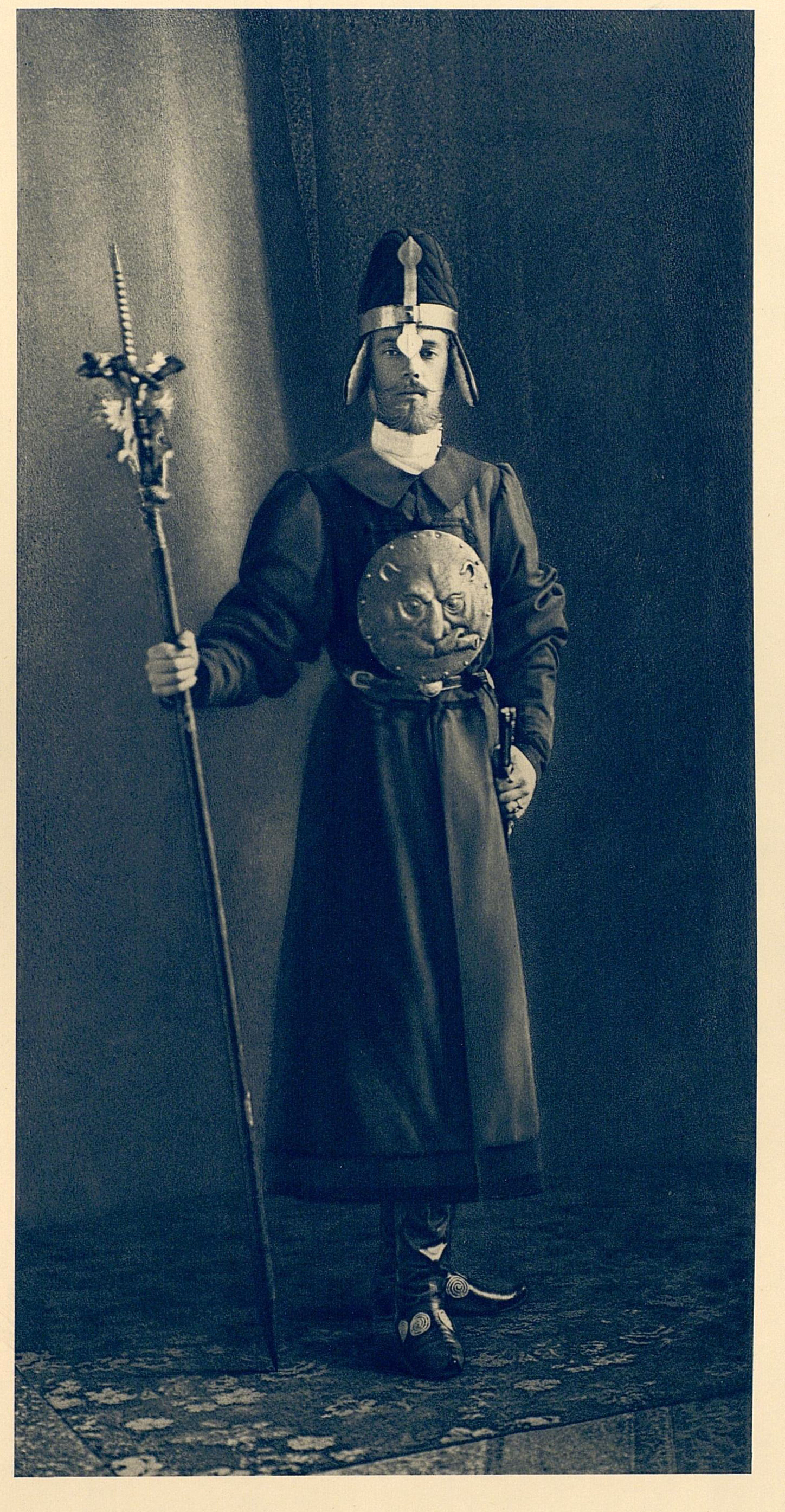
Grand Duke Sergei at 1903 ball in the Winter Palace.

Sergei Mikhailovich loved the military life and served in a number of regiments. Like his father, he was drawn towards ordnance and artillery. After graduating from the Mikhailovsky Artillery School, he started his military service in the Life Guard of the Cavalry Artillery Brigade. In 1891, he became aide-de-camp to the Emperor and in 1899 was promoted to the rank of colonel. In 1904, he was made major general in the House Guards Artillery Brigade of the suite of the Tsar. He replaced his father in 1905 as Inspector General of Artillery, a post he held until 1915 when he was removed under controversy during World War I. In 1908, he became adjutant General. In 1914, he was promoted to the rank of General of Cavalry. From January 1916, he served as Field Inspector General of the Artillery until he resigned his military post at the fall of the monarchy.

Sergei Mikhailovich was tall, reaching six-foot three, and was the only among Grand Duke Michael Nicholaievich's children to inherit their father's blue eyes and blond hair. He became prematurely bald and was considered the least handsome of a very good-looking family. He had a keen sense of the ridiculous, but was pessimistic, as influenced by his tutor Colonel Helmerson. He had the habit of saying "tant pis!" (so much the worse!) to any bad news. Widely considered rude and moody, he was at the same time sincere, affectionate, loved simplicity and was easily accessible without class distinction.

Grand Duke Sergei Mikhailovich was, unlike his brothers, interested in mathematics and physics, which coincided with his fondness for artillery. His only artistic inclination was choral singing, and he formed an amateur chorus of more than sixty voices, including some professional singers. They were directed by Kasatchenko, the master of the Imperial Theater. For a decade, the group met at Sergei's palace every Monday evening from 8:00 pm to 10:30 pm before the Russo-Japanese War stopped it. Like his brothers George and Alexander, Sergei Mikhailovich was also fond of numismatics and gathered a large collection of coins. Like all the Grand Dukes, Sergei was immensely wealthy. Beside his Grand Ducal allowance of 200,000 roubles a year, he received the income from vast personal states, which include a hunting lodge 60 miles (97 km) from St Petersburg. At the death of his father in 1909, his wealth increased even further.

He remained a bachelor, living in the household of his father, and later with his eldest brother on the Neva: the new Michaelovsky Palace in St Petersburg. The halls and corridors were so vast that Sergei used a bicycle to visit his brothers Grand Dukes George and Nicholas Mikhailovich who lived in other wings of the large Palace.

== Ménage à trois ==
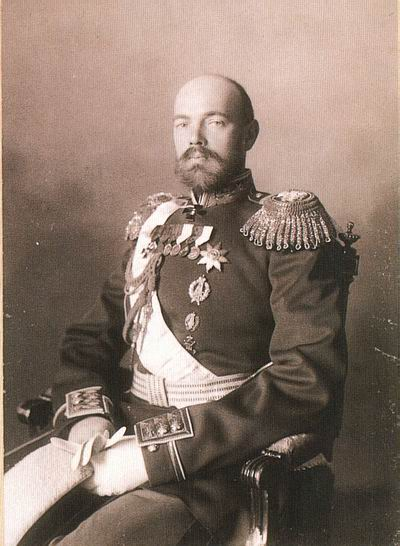
Grand Duke Sergei Mikailovich

In the early 1890s, Grand Duke Sergei Mikhailovich was particularly close to his brother Grand Duke Alexander Mikhailovich. Traveling together to India, they had to stop their trip in Bombay in 1891 upon the sudden death of their mother. Both brothers fell in love with Grand Duchess Xenia Alexandrovna, their first cousin, once removed. She chose his brother over Sergei and married Alexander in 1894. During the last year of Tsar Alexander III's reign, Sergei and his brothers Alexander and George Mikhailovich were constant companions of the future Tsar, Nicholas II. Their closeness ended with Nicholas' ascension to the throne and marriage.

When Nicholas II, then the Tsarevich, broke off with his mistress, the famous ballerina Mathilde Kschessinska, he asked Sergei to take care of her. From 1894, Grand Duke Sergei, who was then 25 years old, became Kschessinska's protector. He provided generously for his mistress. In 1895, the grand duke bought a dacha for her in Strelna. Kschessinska, who was ambitious, used her connections to the Romanovs to promote her career. Sergei, as president of the Imperial Theatres Society, took an active role in the ballet world to secure a prominent place for Kschessinska in the Imperial Ballet. Although Sergei was devoted to Mathilde, she was not in love with him and used him as a tool to fulfill her ambitions. He remained her devoted friend through to the end of his life. He never married and found in Mathilde's company the substitute of a family life.

In February 1900 Kschessinska met Grand Duke Andrei Vladimorovich, who was a son of Grand Duke Vladimir Alexandrovich, Sergei's first cousin. Mathilde fell in love with Andrei and soon they started a new relationship. Grand Duke Sergei tolerated their affair remaining a close and loyal friend to the famous ballerina, but the relationship between the two Grand Dukes was tense. They tried to avoid each other while sharing the same woman for almost two decades.

The ménage à trois became more complicated when on 18 June 1902, Mathilde gave birth to a son. Both Grand Dukes were at first convinced they were the child's father.

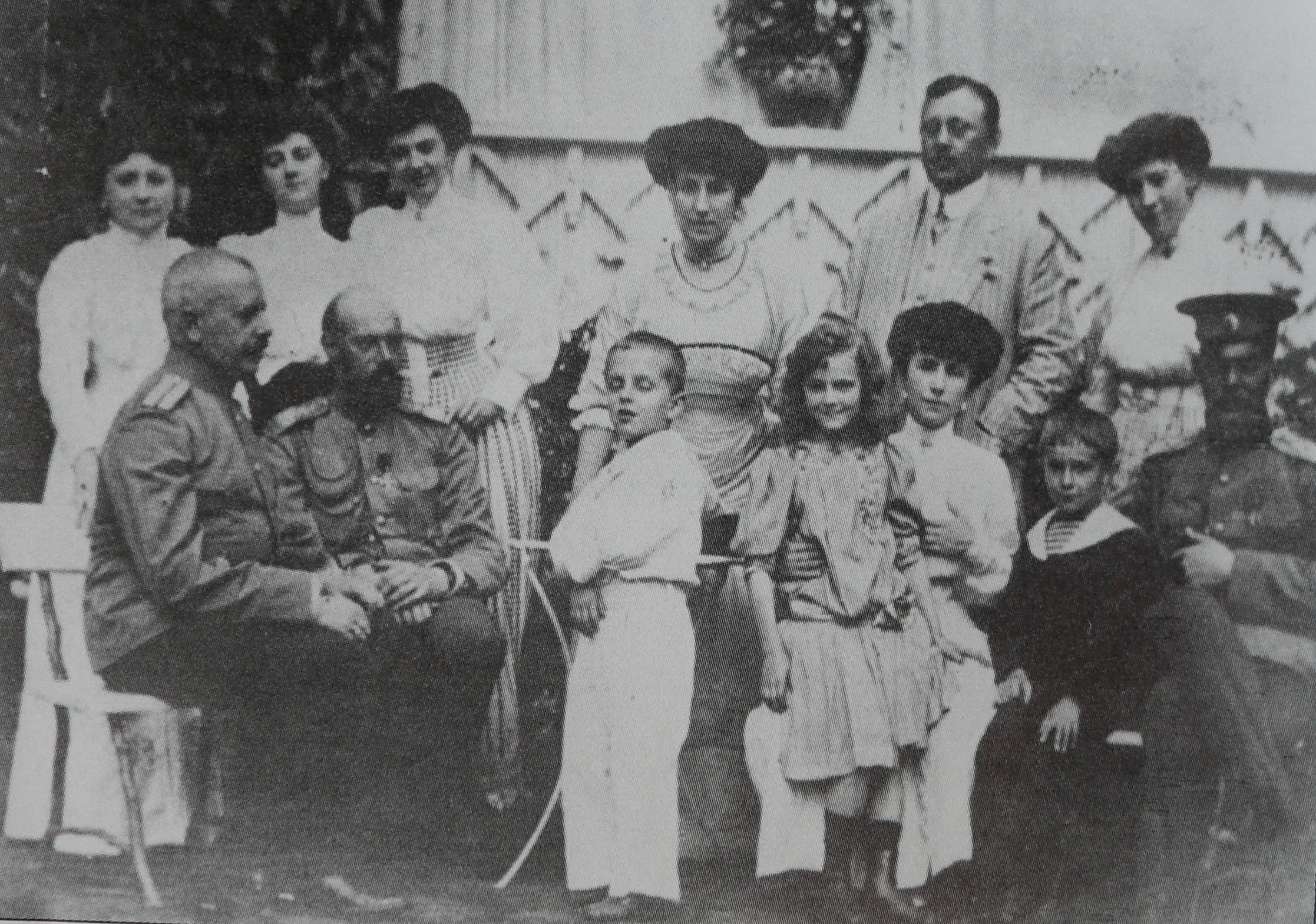
From left to right seated: Baron Zeddeler; Grand Duke Sergei Mikhailovich; Vova, with his aunt Julie behind him; Mathilde with two unidentified children; Gran Duke Andrei Vladimirovich, Strelna, 1909

After the Revolution, both Kschessinska and Grand Duke Andrei maintained that Andrei was the father, but it was Grand Duke Sergei who looked after Mathilde and her son while he was alive. The child, who became known within the family by his nickname Vova, received the name and patronymic of Vladimir Sergeivich, although no surname was made public until 1911. The birth certificate showed Sergei as the father, and he was devoted to the child. The question of Vladimir's paternity remains unresolved. However, most sources attribute the paternity to Grand Duke Andrei Vladimirovich, who the child resembled.

Grand Duke Sergei Mikhailovich also had a relationship with Countess Barbara Vorontzova-Daskova, née Orlova (1870, Paris -1915, Petrograd), the widow of Count Ivan Illarionovitch Vorontzov-Daskov (1866–1897). In 1908 she gave birth to a son, Alexander, in Switzerland. The father of Alexander seems to have been Grand Duke Sergei Mikhailovich. Alexander (1908, Switzerland – 1979, New York) was adopted by a friend of his mother, Sophia Vladimirovna Dehn, whose grandmother was a daughter of Tsar Nicholas I. He spent his childhood in Italy where his adopted father was on naval service. Alexander was a well-known artist and often showed his watercolors at American galleries. He married twice and died in the U.S. in 1979.

== War and revolution ==
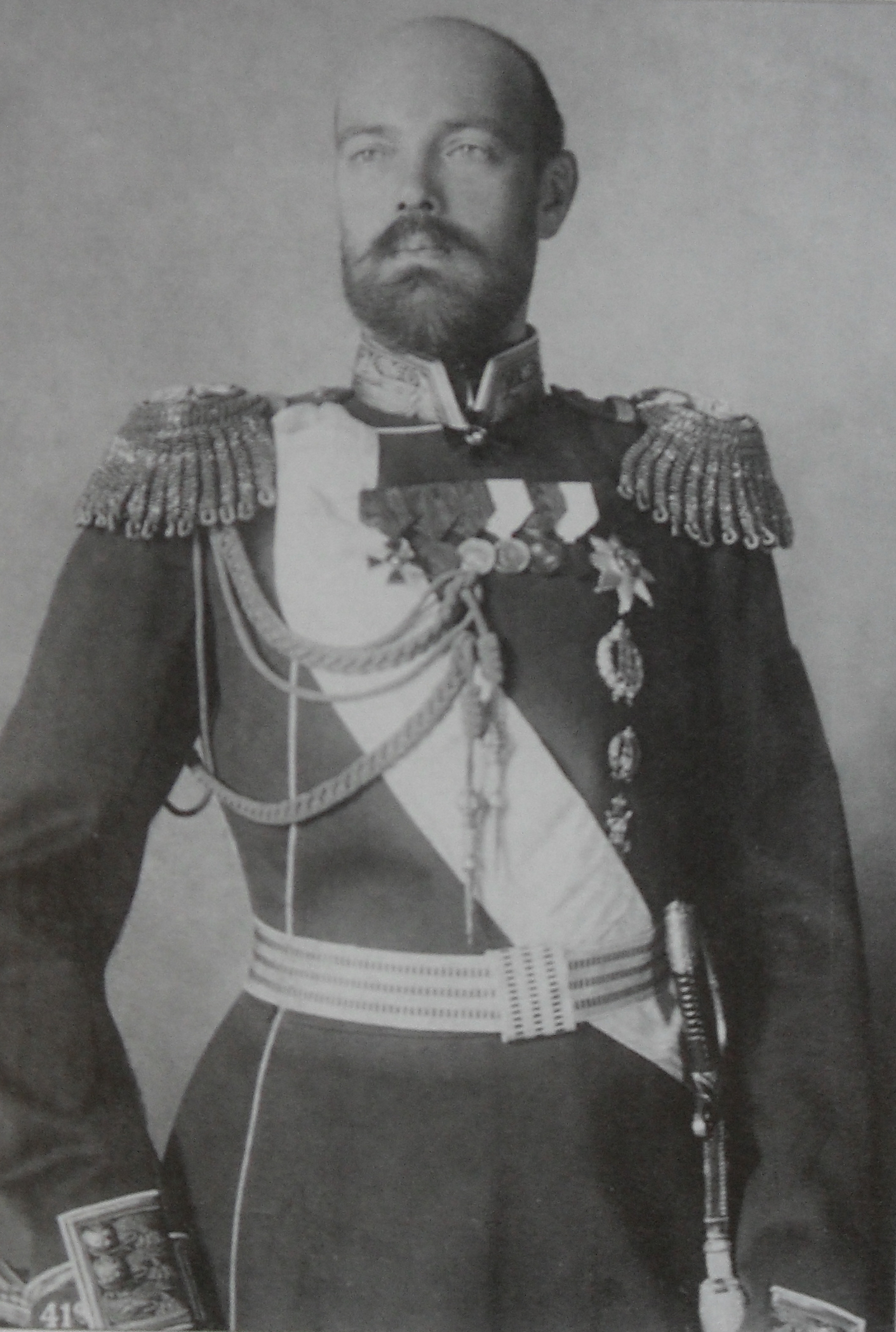
Grand Duke Sergei Mikailovich

After visits to Austria and Germany in 1913 Sergei Mikhailovich reported to the Government of the feverish work of military factories of the central European powers, but his warning about an imminent war was not heeded by the Russian ministers. In the summer of 1914 just before the outbreak of World War I, Grand Duke Sergei was traveling near Lake Baikal when he fell ill with rheumatic fever in Chita. At his return to Mikhailovskoe, during the first days of autumn, his illness, complicated with pleurisy took a severe form. He spent five months confined to bed before being pronounced fit enough to resume his duties. He was appointed inspector general of Artillery and was attached to the general headquarters, once making a trip to Arkhangelsk to check on the munitions sent there by the allies.

As chief of the artillery department Grand Duke Sergei came under fire of the president of the Duma, Mikhail Rodzianko. Corruption and negligence were rampant in the department and there was a scandal over contracts. Kschessinskaya was accused of getting preferential orders for firms in pursuit of economic gains. The grand duke was blamed for not uncovering a band of thieves and protecting the dealings of his mistress. A special commission launched an investigation on the matter and in January 1916, Grand Duke Sergei had to resign as head of the artillery department. He was then appointed Field Inspector General of Artillery at Stavka.

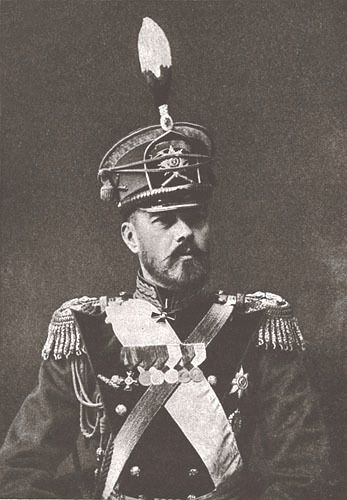
Grand Duke Sergei Mikailovich during the war

He was in a position to deal with Nicholas II every day, living in the same headquarters train with the Tsar. He was increasingly pessimistic about the outcome of the war for Russia but he could not assert any influence over Nicholas II who only trusted his wife Alexandra Feodorova who disliked Sergei Mikhailovich and had listed him among her enemies. The Tsarina following the rumors of corruption that had clouded Sergei's reputation had pressed her husband to make Sergei Mikhailovich resign from the artillery department. The scandal over the bribes did not die down in the last period of Imperial Russia and Grand Duke Sergei spent nearly all his time at Stavka. He became more cautious in an attempt to distance himself from Kshessinskaya, who had used him in her quest for financial profit. About the outcome of the war, Grand Duke Sergei had no hope.

At the fall of the monarchy, Grand Duke Sergei was at Mogilev in the company of Nicholas II when he had to abdicate. During the first months of the provisional government, Grand Duke Sergei remained in Mogilev in voluntary exile on the advice of his brother Grand Duke Nicholas Mikhailovich, because of the cloud of corruption that hung over him as a result of the Ksehesinskaya scandal. However, after twenty-two years of having a substitute of a family life with his mistress, he resisted pressure from his brother to break off all relations with Mathilde and her son.

Sergei Mikhailovich returned to Petrograd at the beginning of June 1917. He remained in the former Imperial capital during the period of the constitutional government, living with his brother Nicholas Mikhailovich in the New Michaelovsky Palace. Grand Duke Sergei proposed to Kschessinskaya. She, although caring for him, did not love him and refused. Instead, she decided to join Grand Duke Andrei in the Caucasus. On 13 July, Grand Duke Sergei went to the Nicholas Railway Station to say goodbye to Mathilde and her son.

== Captivity ==
After the successful Bolshevik coup of November 1917, the Petrograd newspapers published a decree summoning all male Romanovs to report to the dreaded Cheka, the secret police. Initially they were just required not to leave the city. In March 1918, the Romanovs who registered were summoned again, now to be sent away into internal Russian exile. Sergei Mikhailovich was sent to Viatka, a small town in the foothills of the Ural Mountains. With suitcases in hand, the grand duke arrived at the Nicholas railway station on the afternoon of 4 April 1918. Sergei's personal secretary, Fedor Remez (1878–1918), followed him in his exile. At seven that evening, the train pulled out of Petrograd headed east to Siberia. Grand Duke Sergei departed to his destiny in the company of his secretary, three sons of Grand Duke Konstantine Kosntantinovich (Princes: Ivan, Konstantine and Igor Konstantinovich) and Prince Vladimir Paley, the son of the morganatic marriage of Grand Duke Paul Alexandrovich. In Viatka, the Grand Duke was lodged in a different house from his much younger relatives. Although they all were virtually prisoners, they were allowed to walk freely around town, and could attend services at a local church. However, their situation changed after only eleven days.

On 30 April, Grand Duke Sergei, his secretary, and the other Romanovs with them were transferred to Yekaterinburg by order of the Ural Regional Soviet. The journey lasted for three days through the forest of the Urals. On 3 May 1918, the prisoners arrived in Yekaterinburg. They were housed at the Palace Royal Hotel on the city's Voznesensky Prospekt. A few days later, Grand Duchess Elizabeth Feodorovna, sister of the Tsarina, joined them and they were all allowed a certain amount of freedom. Although the Tsar and Tsarina with their children were there nearby at the Ipatiev House, they were unable to make contact. After two weeks, the Ural Regional Soviet decided once again to transfer Grand Duke Sergei and the other Romanovs in his group. On 18 May 1918, they were told that they were to be taken to the town of Alapayevsk, in the northern Urals, 120 miles (190 km) from Yekaterinburg, and ordered to quickly pack. That same afternoon, they boarded a train and, two days later, arrived at their destination.

The Romanovs were placed in the Napolnaya School, on the fringe of the town. The school was small, consisting of only six rooms, the furniture basic but scanty. Each prisoner received an iron bed. They were allowed to move into the desolate former schoolrooms and sort out their living arrangements on their own. Grand Duke Sergei shared a room with Feodor Remez and Prince Paley. Although the captives were under the strict guard of the Red Army soldiers, they were allowed to walk in town, to talk to people and to go to church on feasts days. Preparing to spend a long time in Alapayevsk, they planted flowers and vegetable gardens near the school and spent many hours working there. On rainy days, the Romanovs read Russian novels to each other. Gradually, the regimen toughened and they were forbidden to take walks. The school was encircled with a barbed-wire fence and small trenches. Two weeks later, they were murdered.

== Murder ==
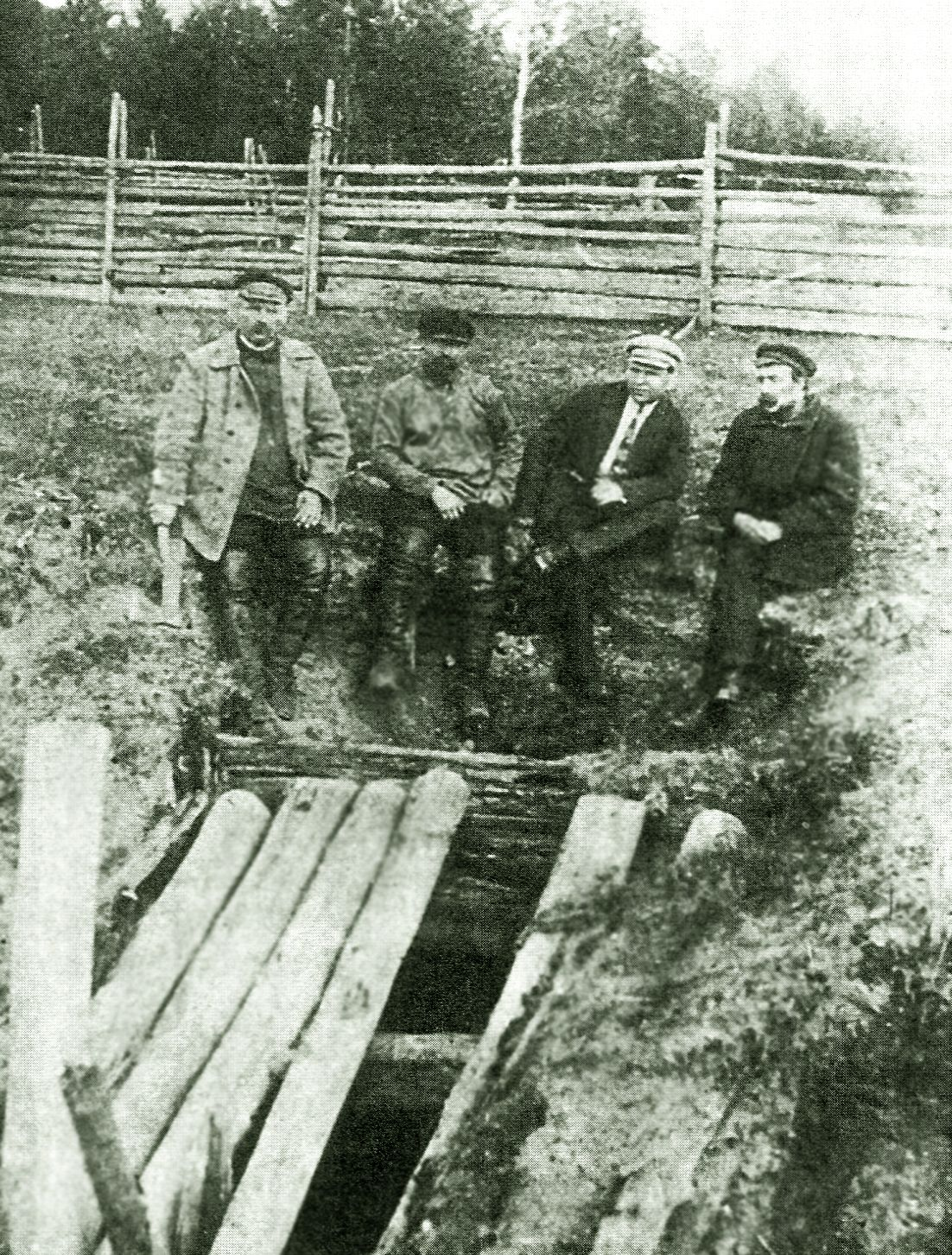
Mine shaft in Alapaevsk where remains of the Romanovs killed there were found

There exists an eyewitness account of the murders of the Romanov group in Alapayevsk, related by one of the local Bolsheviks, Vasisili Ryabov. He later recalled:

"It was night of the 17th to 18th July 1918. When we were sure the whole town was asleep, we quietly stole through the window into the school building. Nobody there noticed our presence, they were already all asleep. We entered through the unlocked door into the building where the women were sleeping, and woke them up, telling them quietly to get dressed at once, as they were to be taken to a safe place because of the possibility of an armed attack. They obeyed silently. We tied their hands behind their backs there and then, blindfolded them, and let them out to the cart, which was already waiting by the school, sat them in it, and sent them off to their destination. After that, we went into the room occupied by the men. We told them the same story as we had told the women. The young princes Konstantinovich (KR's sons) and Prince Paley also obeyed meekly. We took them out into the corridor, blindfolded them, bound their hands behind their backs, and put them in another cart. We had earlier decided that the carts should not go together. The only one to try to oppose us was Grand Duke Sergei Mikhailovich. Physically he was stronger than the rest. We had to grapple with him. He told us categorically that he was not going anywhere, as he knew they all were going to be killed. He barricaded himself behind the cupboard and our efforts to get him out were in vain. We lost precious time. I finally lost my patience and shot at the Grand Duke. However, I only fired with the intention of wounding him slightly and frightening him into submission. I wounded him in the arm. He did not resist further. I bound his hand and covered his eyes. We put him in the last cart and set off. We were in a great hurry: already the dawn was heralding morning. Along the way, Grand Duke Sergei Mikhailovich again repeated that he knew they were all going to be killed. “ Tell me why? He asked. “ I have never been involved in politics. I loved sports, played billiards, and was interested in numismatics. “ I reassured him as best as I could. although I was very agitated myself by everything I have been through that night. Despite his wounded arm, the Grand Duke did not complain. At last, we arrived at the mine. The shaft was not very deep and as it turned out had a ledge on one side that was not covered by water".

At shaft # 7, the deepest and longest unused mine shaft, the carriages stopped. Blindfolded, the Romanovs were ordered to walk across a log placed over the 60-foot-deep (18 m) mine. Grand Duke Sergei Mikhailovcih, the oldest man in the group, was the only one to disobey. He threw himself at the guards and they shot him to death immediately. His body was thrown into the shaft. His relatives were struck in the head and thrown into the deep shaft still alive. A couple of hand grenades were pitched in after that. The mouth of the mine was filled with dry brushwood and set it alight until there were no signs of life beneath the earth.

== Aftermath ==
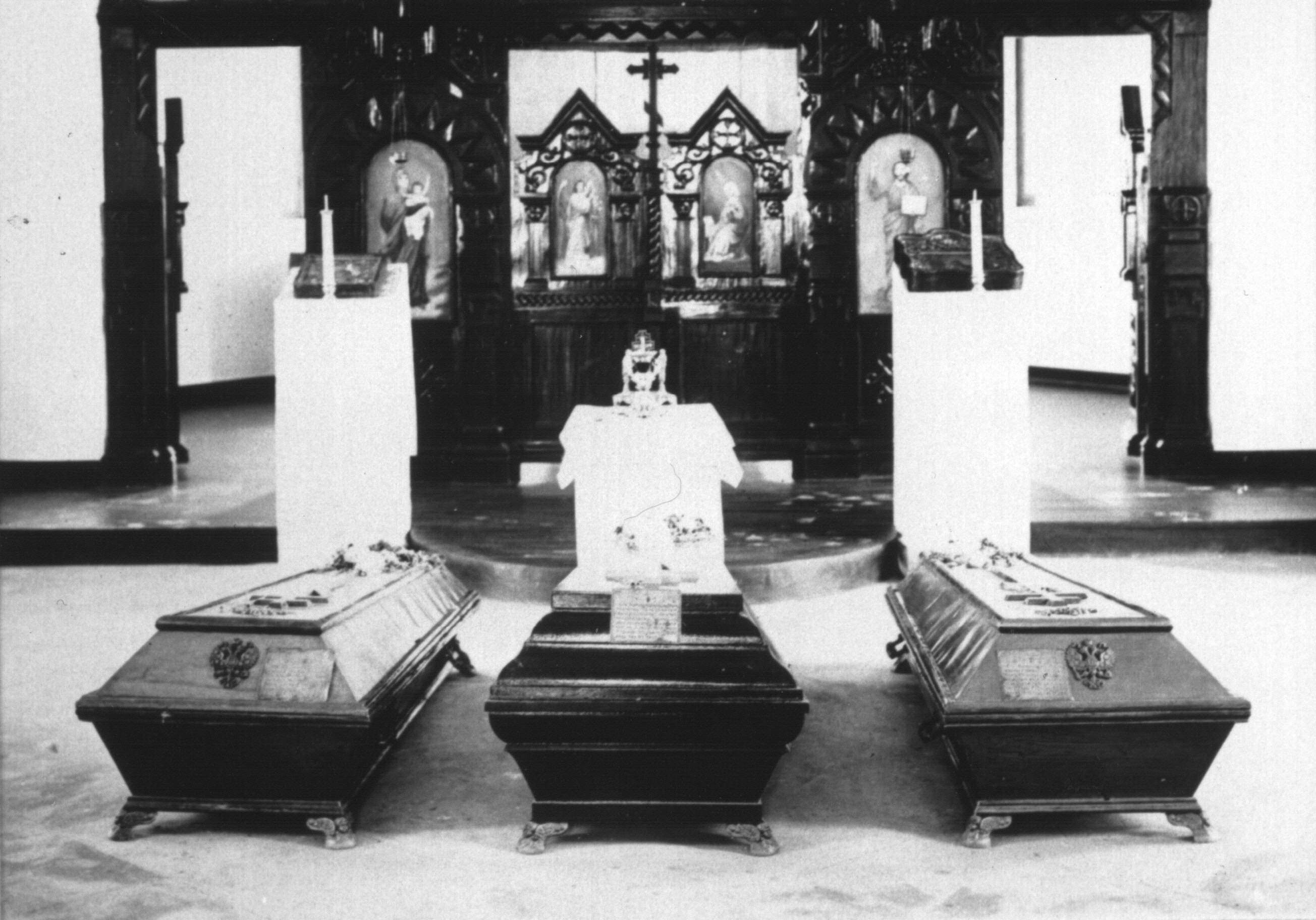
Tombs of Prince Ioann Konstantinovich, Grand Duke Sergei Mikhailovich and Prince Konstantin Konstantinovich at the crypt of All Holy Martyrs Church (Beijing) c. 1938–1947

On 28 September 1918, the White Army captured Alapayevsk, hoping to rescue the prisoners from the school building. Some local peasants directed the investigators of the Romanovs disappearance to the abandoned mine. On 8 October, they began to retrieve the bodies from the shaft. The corpse of Grand Duke Sergei Mikhailovich was recovered two days later.

Identification of the Romanovs was made based on the clothing worn and by papers found in their pockets. The White Army investigators had no medical or dental records, and eleven weeks in the mine had substantially altered the victims' physical appearance. The autopsy revealed that Grand Duke Sergei Mikhailovich had a bruise on the left side of his head, but his death had been caused by a gunshot wound to the right side of his head.

Sergei's relatives received the information gathered about his death. This included the photograph of the bloated corpse. Some time later, Grand Duchess Xenia sent Mathilde Kschessinska the items found on Sergei's body. There was a gold pendant in the shape of a potato on a gold chain, the emblem of the "Potato club which Tsarevich Nicholas, Sergei, some of his brothers and friends had formed in the days of their youth. There was also a small gold medallion with an emerald in the middle, which had been a present to Sergei from Mathilde many years earlier. It contained her portrait; a ten kopek piece minted in 1869, the year of Sergei's birth, and was engraved with the words: 21 August Mala – 25 September. The significance of the dates is not known.

After the autopsies were performed, the bodies of the Romanovs were washed, dressed in white shrouds, and placed in wooden coffins. There was a funeral service for them on 19 October when the coffins were placed in the crypt of the cathedral of the Holy Trinity in Alapayevsk where they remained until July 1919. Then, as Alapayevsk, was about to be retaken by the Red Army, the coffins were moved to Irkutsk. There the coffins rested for less than six months, before the advance of the Red army forced their removal eastward. Early in 1920, the coffins with the remains of Grand Duke Sergei and those killed with him, were taken out of Russia by train through Harbin. By April 1920 the coffins were in Beijing, where they were placed in the crypt of the chapel attached to the Russian Mission. They remained there until 1957 when they were buried at the Russian Orthodox cemetery as the chapel was demolished. The government of the USSR did not have any interest in the preservation of the Russian cemetery in Beijing and in the late 1980s the Chinese authorities converted it into a park. It is believed that the coffins are still in place, now buried beneath a parking area. After the Communist regime collapsed, the mineshaft where the Grand Duke was killed with his relatives became a site of religious pilgrimage and an Orthodox chapel was built there.

== Ancestry ==
Ancestors of Grand Duke Sergei Mikhailovich of Russia

8. Paul I of Russia
4. Nicholas I of Russia
9. Sophie Dorothea of Württemberg
2. Grand Duke Michael Nicolaevich of Russia
10. Frederick William III of Prussia
5. Charlotte of Prussia
11. Louise of Mecklenburg-Strelitz
1. Grand Duke Sergei Mikhailovich of Russia
12. Charles Frederick, Grand Duke of Baden
6. Leopold, Grand Duke of Baden
13. Luise Karoline Geyer von Geyersberg
3. Princess Cecilie of Baden
14. Gustav IV Adolf of Sweden
7. Sophie of Sweden
15. Frederica of Baden

== See also ==
- Romanov sainthood

== Bibliography ==
- Alexander, Grand Duke of Russia, Once a Grand Duke, Cassell, London, 1932.
- Chavchavadze, David, The Grand Dukes, Atlantic, 1989, ISBN 0-938311-11-5
- Cockfield, Jamie H, White Crow, Praeger, 2002, ISBN 0-275-97778-1
- Hall, Coryne, Imperial Dancer, Sutton publishing, 2005, ISBN 0-7509-3558-8
- Katin-Yartsev, M and Shumkov, A. Costume Ball at the Winter Palace. Russky Antiquariat, 2003, ISBN 5981290021
- Maylunas, Andrei and Mironenko, Sergei, A Life Long Passion, Doubleday, New York. 1997.ISBN 0-385-48673-1
- Perry, John and Pleshakov, Constantine, The Flight of the Romanovs, Basic Books, 1999, ISBN 0-465-02462-9.
- Van Der Kiste, John, The Romanovs 1818-1959, Sutton Publishing, 1999, ISBN 0-7509-2275-3.
- Zeepvat, Charlotte, Romanov Autumn , Sutton Publishing, 2000, ISBN 0-7509-2739-9
