= Grand Duke Sergei =

Grand Duke Sergei (Великий князь Сергей) may refer to:

- Grand Duke Sergei Alexandrovich of Russia (1857–1905)
- Grand Duke Sergei Mikhailovich of Russia (1869–1918)
