= Constantine Constantinovich =

Constantine Constantinovich may refer to:

- Grand Duke Konstantin Konstantinovich of Russia (22 August 1858 – 15 June 1915)
- Prince Constantine Constantinovich of Russia (1 January 1891 – 18 July 1918)
