= Princess Elisabeth of Saxe-Altenburg (1865–1927) =

Grand Duchess of Russia

Princess Elisabeth
- Grand Duchess Elizabeth Mavrikievna of Russia
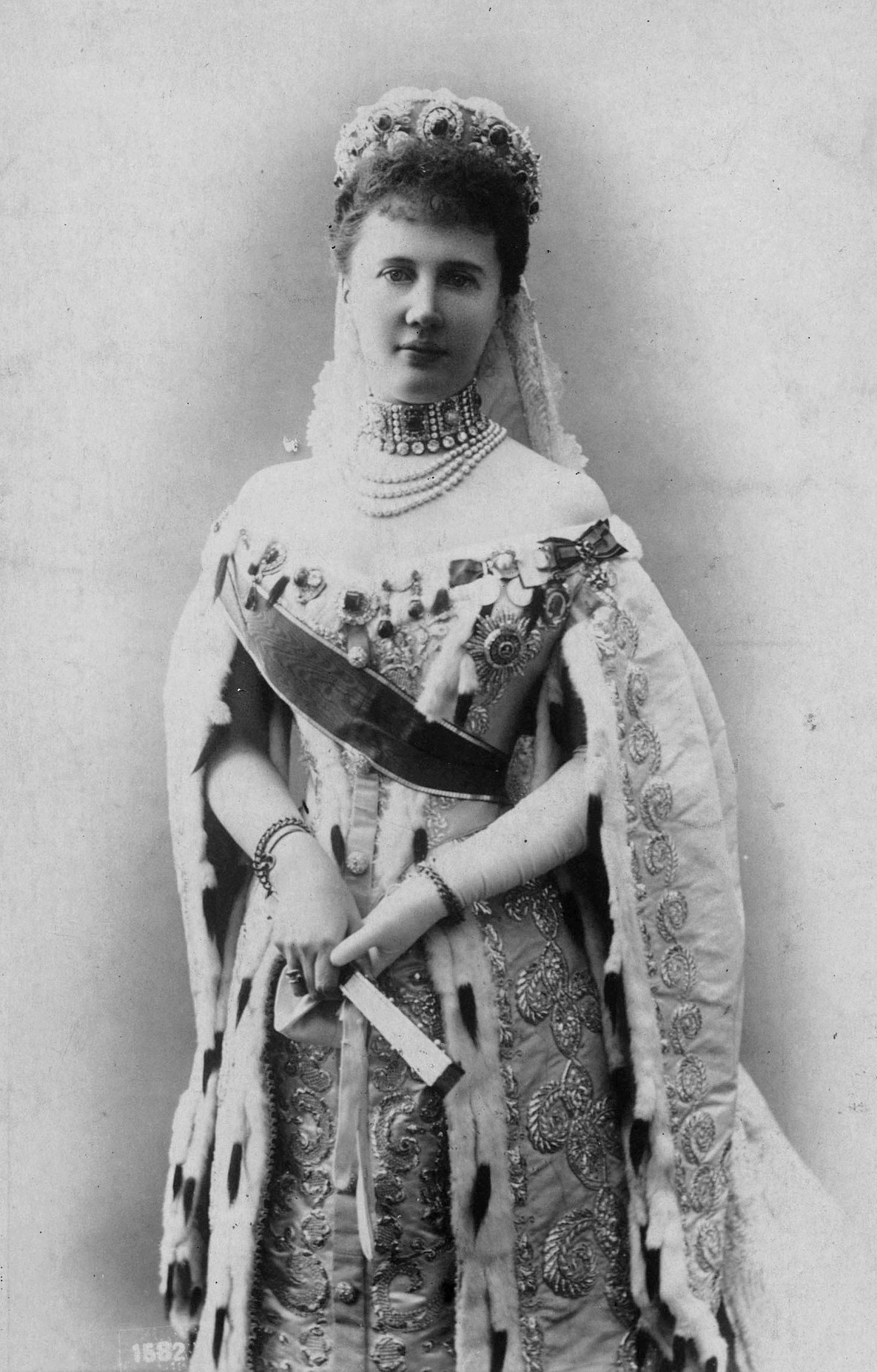
- Princess Elizabeth of Saxe-Altenberg, later Grand Duchess Elizabeth Mavrikievna of Russia, in the 1890s
- Born: 25 January 1865; Meiningen, Saxe-Meiningen
- Died: 24 March 1927 (aged 62); Leipzig, Saxony, Weimar Republic
- Spouse: Grand Duke Konstantin Konstantinovich of Russia (m. 1884; died 1915)
- Issue: Prince John Konstantinovich; Prince Gabriel Konstantinovich; Princess Tatiana Konstantinovna; Prince Constantine Konstantinovich; Prince Oleg Konstantinovich; Prince Igor Konstantinovich; Prince George Konstantinovich; Princess Natalia Konstantinovna; Princess Vera Konstantinovna
Names
- German: Elisabeth Auguste Marie Agnes
- House: Wettin (by birth); Holstein-Gottorp-Romanov (by marriage)
- Father: Prince Moritz of Saxe-Altenburg
- Mother: Princess Augusta of Saxe-Meiningen

Grand Duchess Elizabeth Mavrikievna of Russia (Russian: Елизавета Маврикиевна; née Princess Elisabeth Auguste Marie Agnes of Saxe-Altenburg; 25 January [O.S. 13 January] 1865 – 24 March 1927) was a Russian grand duchess by marriage. She was the wife of Grand Duke Konstantin Konstantinovich of Russia (1858–1915).

== Early life ==
Princess Elisabeth, as she was usually known, was the second child of Prince Moritz of Saxe-Altenburg (1829–1907) and his wife, Princess Augusta of Saxe-Meiningen (1843–1919). During her youth she made several trips around Europe visiting her relatives.

== Marriage ==
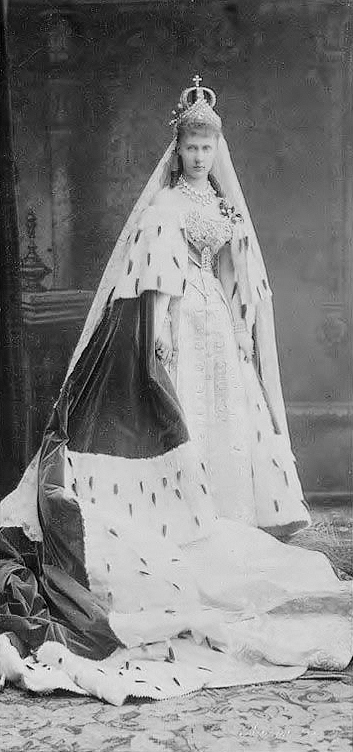
Princess Elisabeth of Saxe-Altenburg on her wedding day.

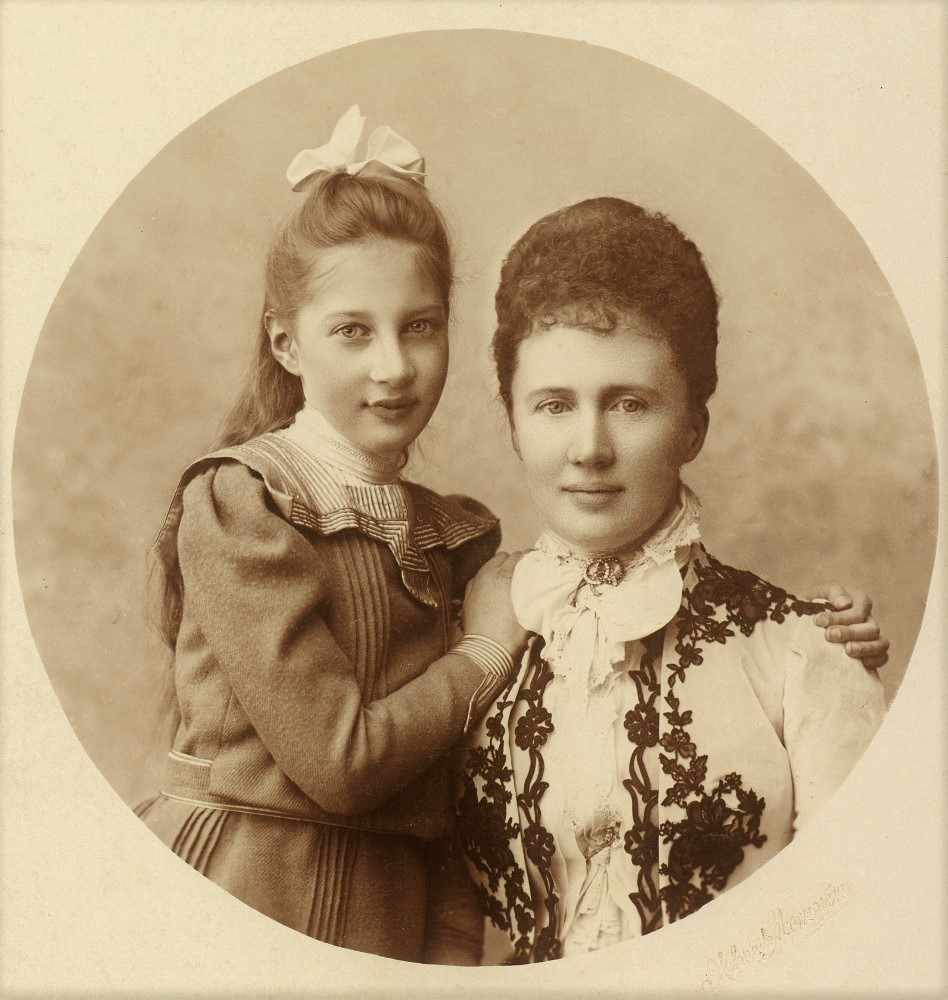
Grand Duchess Elizabeth Mavrikievna and her daughter, Princess Tatiana Konstantinovna

In 1882, when she was 16, she met her second cousin Grand Duke Konstantin Konstantinovich of Russia in Altenburg. His mother and her father were first cousins; in addition to that, they shared Emperor Pavel I as a common ancestor. There was immediately some talk of marriage. However, although she said she was ready to marry Konstantin, he hesitated, although he was 24 years old. When she left, he promised to write often, but he never did, as he was considered tremendously shy. Nevertheless, he did write several poems about her. In 1884, she visited Russia and the wedding was announced, although she manifested her wish to keep her Lutheran faith, which was a serious blow for her future husband, since he believed firmly in the Russian Orthodox Church. Thought to be even worse was that she refused to kiss the cross held in Orthodox services.

On the wedding day, which took place on 27 April [O.S. 15 April] 1884 in Saint Petersburg, she wrote to him a letter, saying that "I promise you that I will never do anything to anger nor hurt you through our divided religions... I can only tell you again, how very much I love you".

The marriage was considered a success, although Grand Duke Konstantin secretly kept male lovers.

== Life in Russia ==
Grand Duchess Elizaveta Mavrikievna, or "Mavra" as she was known within the Romanov family, was a popular figure, and got on quite well with her nephew Tsar Nicholas II.

She outlived most of her children. In 1905, her daughter Natalia died at exactly two months old. When World War I broke out, Elizaveta found herself supporting the side fighting against her native Germany. Several of her sons, who were trained soldiers, joined the army and fought. One of them, Oleg, was killed in 1914 in Lithuania, where Elizaveta quickly went to see her dying son. Their son's death led her husband to his death in 1915. That same year her son-in-law, Princess Tatiana's husband, was killed in action.

== Later life and exile ==
Konstantin's wife; two youngest children, Prince George and Princess Vera; and two grandchildren (Ioann's children Vsevolod and Catherine), remained at Pavlovsk throughout the war, the rule of the Provisional Government, and after the October Revolution.

Three of her sons (Ioann, Konstantin, and Igor) were murdered in a mineshaft by Bolsheviks in Alapaievsk, Siberia in July 1918, along with several other members of the family. Her brother-in-law, Grand Duke Dmitry Konstantinovich was shot in Petrograd the following year.

In the fall of 1918, they were permitted by the Bolsheviks to move by a boat called Ångermanland to Sweden (via Tallinn to Helsinki and via Mariehamn to Stockholm), at the invitation of the Swedish queen. In Stockholm harbor they met prince Gustaf Adolf who took them to the royal palace. Later, Vsevolod and Catherine were able to reunite with their mother.

Elizaveta Mavrikievna, Vera, and Georgi lived in Sweden for the next two years, first in Stockholm then in Saltsjöbaden, but Sweden was too expensive so they moved to Belgium by invitation of Albert I of Belgium. Later they moved to Germany, settling in Altenburg where they lived for 30 years, except for a couple of years in England. Elizaveta died of cancer on 24 March 1927 in Leipzig. Prince Georgi died in New York City in 1938. Princess Vera lived in Germany until Soviet forces occupied the east part of the country, when she fled to Hamburg, and in 1951 she moved to the United States and died there in 2001, in New York City.

A scarab brooch given to the Princess by her husband in 1891 was auctioned by Sotheby's in 2012.

== Archives ==
Elizaveta Mavrikievna's personal papers (including correspondence and photographs) are preserved in the "Romanov Family Papers" collection in the Hoover Institution Archives (Stanford, California, USA).

== Issue ==
Konstantin and Elizaveta had nine children:

- Prince Ioann (1886–1918); married Princess Helen of Serbia and had issue.
- Prince Gavriil (1887–1955); married, firstly, in a morganatic union, to Antonina Rafailovna Nesterovskaya. He married, secondly, Princess Irina Ivanovna Kurakina.
- Princess Tatiana (1890–1979); married, firstly, Prince Konstantine Bagration of Mukhrani; married secondly, in 1921, Alexander Vasilievich Korotchenzov (d. 1922)
- Prince Konstantin (1891–1918)
- Prince Oleg (1892–1914)
- Prince Igor (1894–1918)
- Prince Georgy (1903–1938)
- Princess Natalia (died at exactly two months, 1905)
- Princess Vera (1906–2001)
