= Alapayevsk =

Town in Sverdlovsk Oblast, Russia

Alapayevsk Алапаевск
- Town
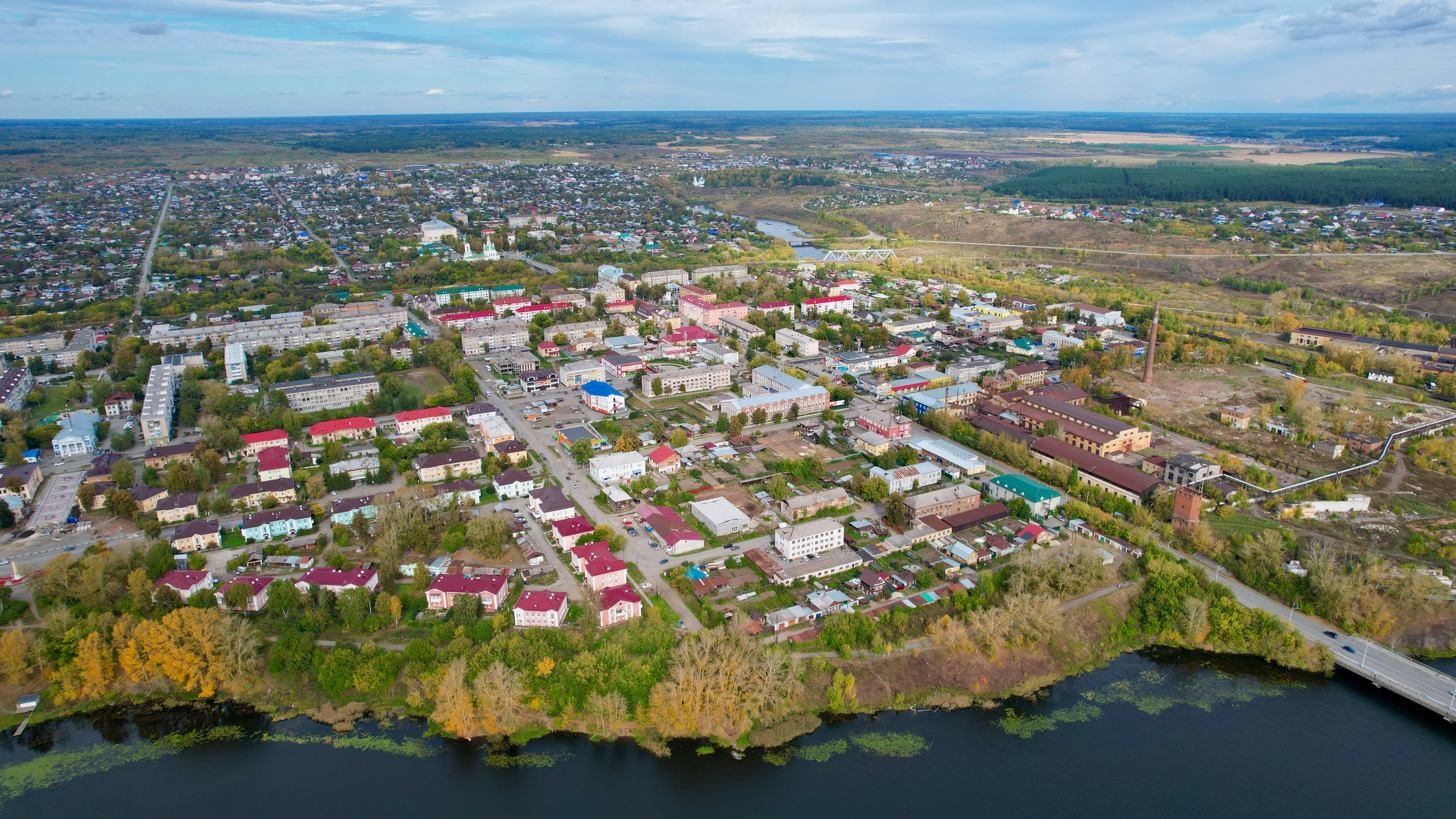
- Aerial view of Alapayevsk

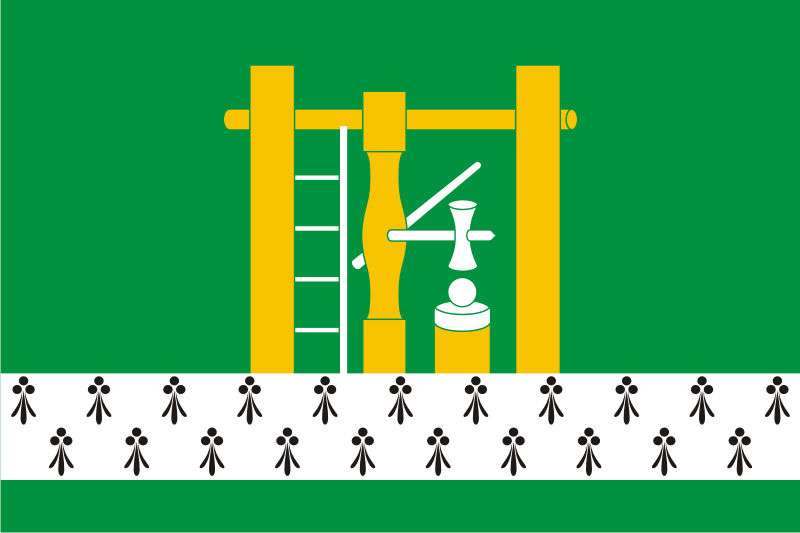
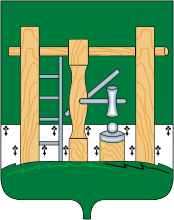
- Flag Coat of arms
- Interactive map of Alapayevsk
- Location of Alapayevsk Alapayevsk (Sverdlovsk Oblast)
- Coordinates: 57°51′N 61°42′E
- Country: Russia
- Federal subject: Sverdlovsk Oblast
- First mentioned: 1639
- Town status since: 1781

Area
  - Total: 25 km^{2} (9.7 sq mi)
- Elevation: 135 m (443 ft)

Population (2010 Census)
  - Total: 38,192
  - Estimate (2025): 35,704 (−6.5%)
  - Density: 1,500/km^{2} (4,000/sq mi)

Administrative status
  - Subordinated to: Town of Alapayevsk
  - Capital of: Town of Alapayevsk

Municipal status
  - Urban okrug: Alapayevsk Urban Okrug
  - Capital of: Alapayevsk Urban Okrug
- Time zone: UTC+5 (MSK+2)
- Postal code: 624600–624619
- Dialing code: +7 34346
- OKTMO ID: 65728000001

Alapayevsk (Russian: Алапа́евск) is a town in Sverdlovsk Oblast, Russia, located at the confluence of the Neyva and Alapaikha rivers. Population: 38,192 (2010 census); 44,263 (2002 census); 50,060 (1989 census); 49,000 (1968).

== History ==
Alapayevsk is one of the oldest centers of ferrous metallurgy in the Urals with the first factory built in 1704. The town proper was founded in 1781.

=== Murder of Russian Imperial family members ===
On July 18, 1918, the day after the shooting at Yekaterinburg of the last tsar, Nicholas II and family, other members of the extended Russian royal family, the Romanovs, including a nun, and their servants, met a brutal death there being thrown down a mineshaft near Alapayevsk by the local Bolsheviks on the orders of the Ural Soviet. (Note: Member of the Presidium of the Ural Regional Soviet Georgy Safarov oversaw the killings) All except Grand Duke Sergey Mikhaylovich (who was the first one to die; he was shot before they could throw him in) survived the fall, hand-grenades were thrown down after them killing Grand Duke Sergey's secretary, Fyodor Remez. Other victims died a slow death including the Prince Ioann Konstantinovich of Russia, Prince Konstantin Konstantinovich of Russia, Prince Igor Konstantinovich of Russia and Prince Vladimir Pavlovich Paley, and Grand Duchess Elizabeth Fyodorovna (born Princess Elisabeth of Hesse and by Rhine). Grand Duchess Elizabeth was the sister of Empress Alexandra; when her husband, the Tsar's uncle, was murdered in 1905, she gave all her wealth to the poor and became a nun, but she was shown no mercy. Killed with her was a nun who had accompanied her - Varvara Yakovleva.

The bodies were recovered from the mine by the White Army in September 1918. The bodies were placed in coffins and despite the struggles between the Whites and the opposing Red Army, they were moved to the far east. Grand Duchess Elizabeth's remains were ultimately taken to Jerusalem, where they were laid to rest in the Church of Maria Magdalene, while the coffins of the others were interred in a former Russian Mission in Beijing, now beneath a parking area.

In 1981, Grand Duchess Elizabeth was canonized by the Russian Orthodox Church Outside Russia, and in 1992 by the Moscow Patriarchate.

Alapayevsk is a place of pilgrimage to the memory of Grand Duchess Elizabeth.

== Administrative and municipal status ==
Within the framework of the administrative divisions, it is, together with nine rural localities, incorporated as the Town of Alapayevsk—an administrative unit with the status equal to that of the districts. As a municipal division, the Town of Alapayevsk is incorporated as Alapayevsk Urban Okrug.

== Transport ==
The Alapayevsk narrow-gauge railway serves the communities around Alapayevsk.

== Miscellaneous ==
Local orphanage (Alapaevsk Family-Type Orphanage) proclaims itself as the largest in the Urals.

== Notable people ==
The composer Pyotr Ilyich Tchaikovsky spent a part of his childhood in Alapayevsk.
