= Prince Georgy Konstantinovich of Russia =

Russian prince

George Konstantinovich Romanoff
- Prince of the Imperial Blood
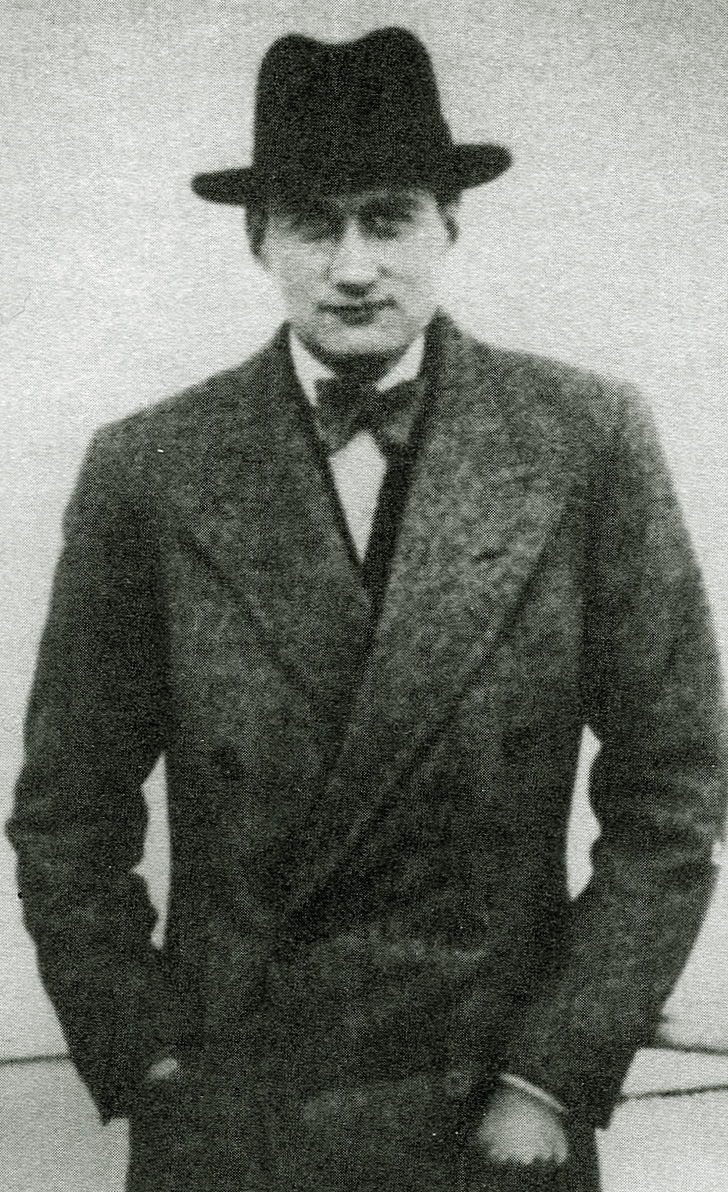
- Born: 6 May 1903; Saint Petersburg, Russian Empire
- Died: 7 November 1938 (aged 35); New York City, New York, U.S.
- House: Holstein-Gottorp-Romanov
- Father: Grand Duke Constantine Constantinovich of Russia
- Mother: Princess Elisabeth of Saxe-Altenburg

Prince of the Imperial Blood George Konstantinovich of Russia (6 May 1903 – 7 November 1938), was the youngest son of Grand Duke Konstantin Konstantinovich of Russia and his wife Grand Duchess Yelizaveta Mavrikiyevna.

At age 12, Georgy was the one who announced his father's death on the 15th of June 1915 to Tsar Nicholas II.

Following the Russian Revolution of 1917, he escaped to Sweden in October 1918 with his mother, younger sister Vera Konstantinovna, and niece and nephew aboard the Swedish ship Ångermanland.

Prince Georgy and Princess Vera remained at Pavlovsk Palace throughout the war, the chaotic rule of the Provisional Government, and after the October Revolution. In the fall of 1918, they were permitted by the Bolsheviks to be taken by ship to Sweden (on the Ångermanland, via Tallinn to Helsinki and via Mariehamn to Stockholm), at the invitation of the Swedish queen.

At Stockholm harbor they met prince Gustaf Adolf who took them to the Stockholm royal palace. Yelizaveta Mavrikiyevna, Vera, and Georgy lived for the next two years in Sweden, first in Stockholm then in Saltsjöbaden; but Sweden was too expensive for them, so they moved first to Belgium by invitation of King Albert I of Belgium, and then to Germany, settling in Altenburg where they lived thirty years, except for a couple of years in England. Yelizaveta died of cancer on 24 March 1927 in Leipzig.

Georgy, who never married, became a successful interior designer. He died of complications following surgery in New York City at the age of 35.

He is buried next to his sister Princess Vera Konstantinovna at the Russian Orthodox Cemetery of Novo-Diveevo in Nanuet, New York.

== Ancestors ==
Ancestors of Prince Georgy Konstantinovich of Russia

8. Nicholas I of Russia
4. Grand Duke Constantine Nikolaevich of Russia
9. Princess Charlotte of Prussia
2. Grand Duke Constantine Constantinovich of Russia
10. Joseph, Duke of Saxe-Altenburg
5. Princess Alexandra of Saxe-Altenburg
11. Duchess Amelia of Württemberg
1. Prince George Constantinovich of Russia
12. George, Duke of Saxe-Altenburg
6. Prince Moritz of Saxe-Altenburg
13. Duchess Marie Louise of Mecklenburg-Schwerin
3. Princess Elisabeth of Saxe-Altenburg
14. Bernhard II, Duke of Saxe-Meiningen
7. Princess Augusta of Saxe-Meiningen
15. Princess Marie Frederica of Hesse-Kassel
