= Prince Oleg Konstantinovich of Russia =

Russian prince

Oleg Konstantinovich Romanov
- Prince of the Imperial Blood
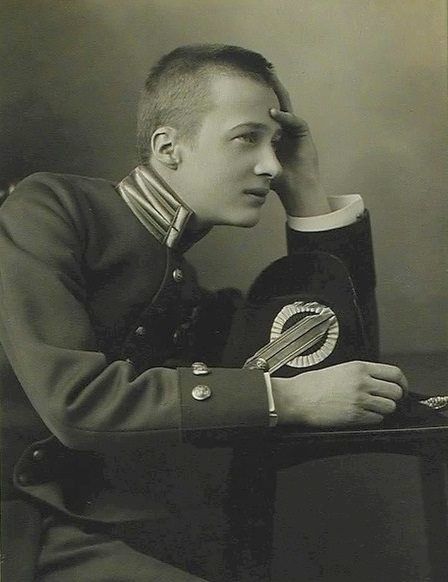
- Prince Oleg Konstantinovich of Russia
- Born: 27 November 1892; Saint Petersburg, Russian Empire
- Died: 12 October 1914 (aged 21); Vilnius, Russian Empire
- House: Holstein-Gottorp-Romanov
- Father: Grand Duke Konstantin Konstantinovich of Russia
- Mother: Princess Elisabeth of Saxe-Altenburg

Prince of the Imperial Blood Oleg Konstantinovich of Russia (27 November [O.S. 15 November] 1892 – 12 October [O.S. 29 September] 1914) was the fourth son and fifth child of Grand Duke Konstantin Konstantinovich (1858-1915).

He died of an infection from a wound received fighting against the Imperial German Army during World War I.

== Early life ==
Prince Oleg was generally considered to be the brightest of Grand Duke Konstantine's children. He had great curiosity and created complicated fantasy games for himself and his siblings to play.

Grand Duke Konstantin, a poet himself, arranged for his children to receive lessons from experts in a variety of fields. Well-known archaeologists told the children about their latest expeditions, architects showed the children slides and explained their works, choirs of Old Believers and peasants from all corners of the empire were brought to sing church music or folk songs to the children. Oleg was so intelligent that his father decided to send him to a prestigious school, the Alexander Lyceum, rather than to give him the standard military education that the other men in the family received. Konstantin's unconventional choice of education for Prince Oleg met with disapproval from his family members. Oleg was Grand Duke Konstantin's favorite son. At one point he was engaged to marry his cousin, Princess Nadezhda Petrovna of Russia, but this hope was prevented by the advent of World War I.

== Service in World War I and death ==
Prince Oleg, with four of his brothers, served in the Guards during World War I. He was wounded while fighting against the Germans near Vladislavovas (today Kudirkos Naumiestis). Emergency surgery in Vilna (today Vilnius) could not save him. As he was dying, he said, "I am so happy. It will encourage the troops to know that the Imperial House is not afraid to shed its blood."

== Ancestry ==
Ancestors of Prince Oleg Konstantinovich of Russia

8. Nicholas I of Russia
4. Grand Duke Konstantin Nikolayevich of Russia
9. Princess Charlotte of Prussia
2. Grand Duke Konstantin Konstantinovich of Russia
10. Joseph, Duke of Saxe-Altenburg
5. Princess Alexandra of Saxe-Altenburg
11. Duchess Amelia of Württemberg
1. Prince Oleg Konstantinovich of Russia
12. George, Duke of Saxe-Altenburg
6. Prince Moritz of Saxe-Altenburg
13. Duchess Marie Louise of Mecklenburg-Schwerin
3. Princess Elisabeth of Saxe-Altenburg
14. Bernhard II, Duke of Saxe-Meiningen
7. Princess Augusta of Saxe-Meiningen
15. Princess Marie Frederica of Hesse-Kassel
