= Prince John Konstantinovich of Russia =

Russian prince (1886-1918)

Prince John Konstantinovich
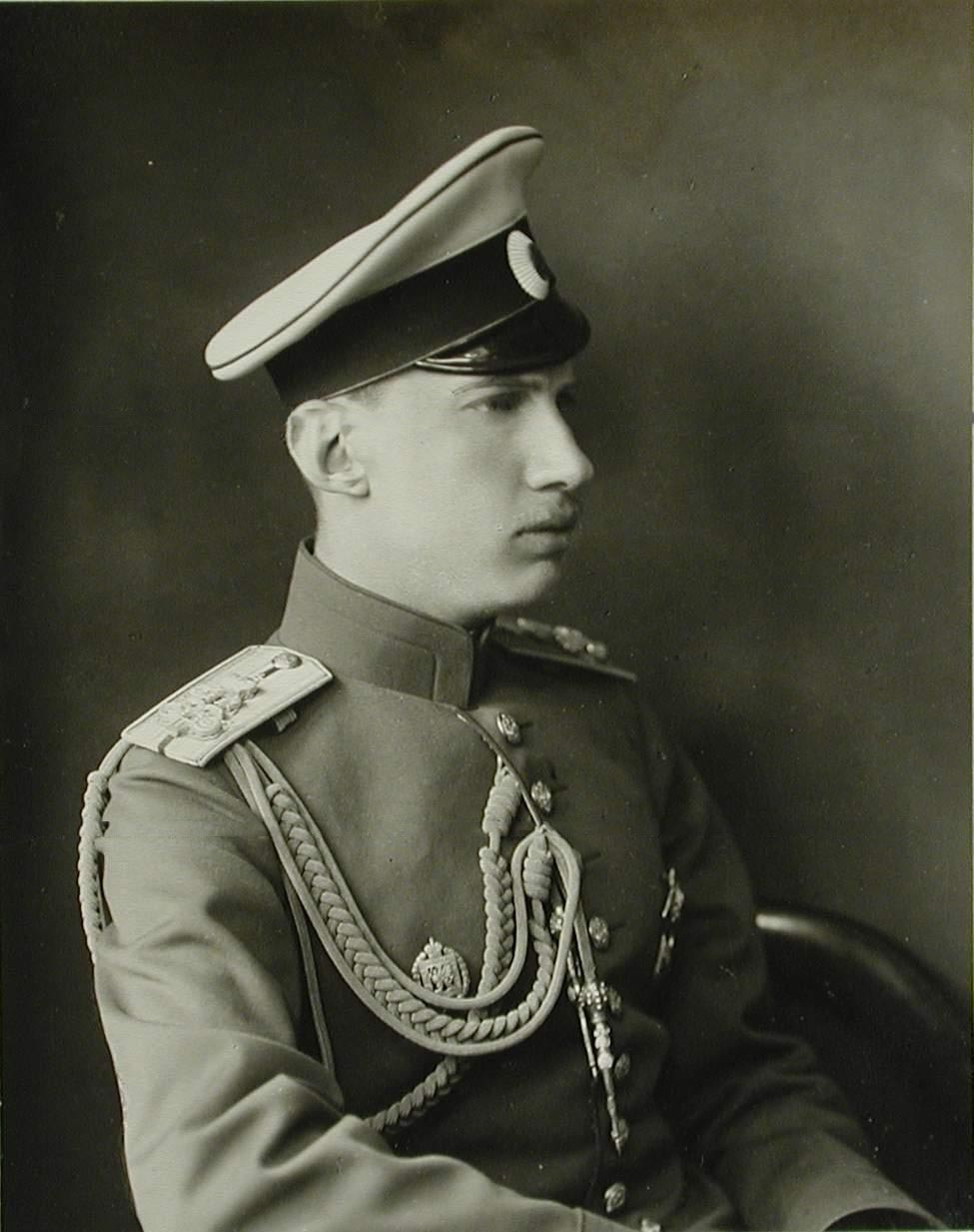
- Prince Ioann Konstantinovich of Russia in his military uniform of the Imperial Russian Army (1913)
- Born: 5 July 1886; Pavlovsk Palace, Pavlovsk, Saint Petersburg, Russian Empire
- Died: 18 July 1918 (aged 32); Alapayevsk, Russian SFSR
- Cause of death: Murder
- Spouse: Princess Helen of Serbia (m. 1911)
- Issue: Prince Vsevolod Ivanovich; Princess Catherine Ivanovna
- House: Holstein-Gottorp-Romanov
- Father: Grand Duke Konstantin Konstantinovich of Russia
- Mother: Princess Elisabeth of Saxe-Altenburg

Prince John Konstantinovich of Russia, formerly Grand Duke John Konstantinovich of Russia (Russian: Иоанн Константинович; 5 July 1886 – 18 July 1918), sometimes also known as Prince Ivan, Prince Ioann or Prince Johan, was the eldest son of Grand Duke Konstantin Konstantinovich of Russia and Yelizaveta Mavrikievna, née Princess Elisabeth of Saxe-Altenburg. He was described by contemporaries as a gentle, religious person, nicknamed "Ioannchik" by his relatives.

== Early life ==
Imperial Monogram of Prince Ioann Konstantinovich

Ioann Konstantinovich was born in Pavlovsk Palace, as a Grand Duke of Russia with the style Imperial Highness, but at the age of just 9 days, an Ukaz of his cousin Emperor Alexander III of Russia stripped him of that title, as the Ukaz amended the House Law by limiting the grand-ducal title only to legitimate patrilineal grandsons of a reigning emperor. As a result, he received the new title, Prince of the Imperial Blood (Prince of Russia) with the style of Highness.

He once entertained the possibility of becoming an Orthodox monk, but eventually fell in love with Princess Helen of Serbia, the eldest child and only surviving daughter of King Peter I of Serbia by his wife, Princess Zorka of Montenegro, whose aunts were Grand Duchess Militza, Grand Duchess Anastasia of Russia and Queen Elena of Italy.

They married on 2 September 1911, and Helen took the name Princess Yelena Petrovna of Russia. As a daughter of the reigning King, after the marriage, she retained her style of Royal Highness and as such she had the right to receive foreign diplomats in her own right, unlike her husband. They had a son, Prince Vsevolod Ivanovich (20 January 1914 – 18 June 1973), and a daughter, Princess Yekaterina Ivanovna (12 July 1915 – 13 March 2007), who was the last member of the Imperial Family to be born before the fall of the dynasty, and was ultimately to become the last surviving uncontested dynast of the Imperial House of Russia.

== Revolution and death ==
Prince Ioann fought in the First World War of 1914–1918, was decorated as a war hero, and was at the front when the Russian Revolution of 1917 started. Ioann was deeply religious from childhood; in his later years, he served as a church choir director, and in early 1918, he was ordained a subdeacon by Metropolitan Veniamin (Kazansky) of Petrograd, serving him in the churches of Petrograd. In April 1918 the Bolshevik authorities exiled him to the Urals, and in July the same year had him murdered in a mineshaft near Alapayevsk, along with his brothers Prince Konstantin Konstantinovich and Prince Igor Konstantinovich, his cousin Prince Vladimir Pavlovich Paley, and other relatives and friends.

His body was eventually buried in Beijing, in the cemetery of the Russian Orthodox Mission, which was destroyed in 1986 to build a park. His sister Princess Vera Konstantinovna, mother Grand Duchess Yelizaveta Mavrikievna and wife Princess Yelena Petrovna left Russia in April 1919 with help from the King of Norway. His daughter Princess Yekaterina married Ruggero, Marchese Farace di Villaforesta. Yekaterina lived in Buenos Aires and later in Montevideo, Uruguay where she died in 2007. His sister Princess Vera Konstantinovna, the youngest daughter of Grand Duke Konstantin Konstantinovich, died in New York in 2001, aged 94.

== Ancestry ==
Ancestors of Prince John Konstantinovich of Russia

8. Nicholas I of Russia
4. Grand Duke Konstantin Nikolaevich of Russia
9. Princess Charlotte of Prussia
2. Grand Duke Konstantin Konstantinovich of Russia
10. Joseph, Duke of Saxe-Altenburg
5. Princess Alexandra of Saxe-Altenburg
11. Duchess Amelia of Württemberg
1. Prince Ioann Konstantinovich of Russia
12. George, Duke of Saxe-Altenburg
6. Prince Moritz of Saxe-Altenburg
13. Duchess Marie Louise of Mecklenburg-Schwerin
3. Princess Elisabeth of Saxe-Altenburg
14. Bernard II, Duke of Saxe-Meiningen
7. Princess Augusta of Saxe-Meiningen
15. Princess Marie Frederica of Hesse-Kassel
