= Prince Igor Constantinovich of Russia =

Russian prince

Igor Konstantinovich Romanoff
- Prince of the Imperial Blood
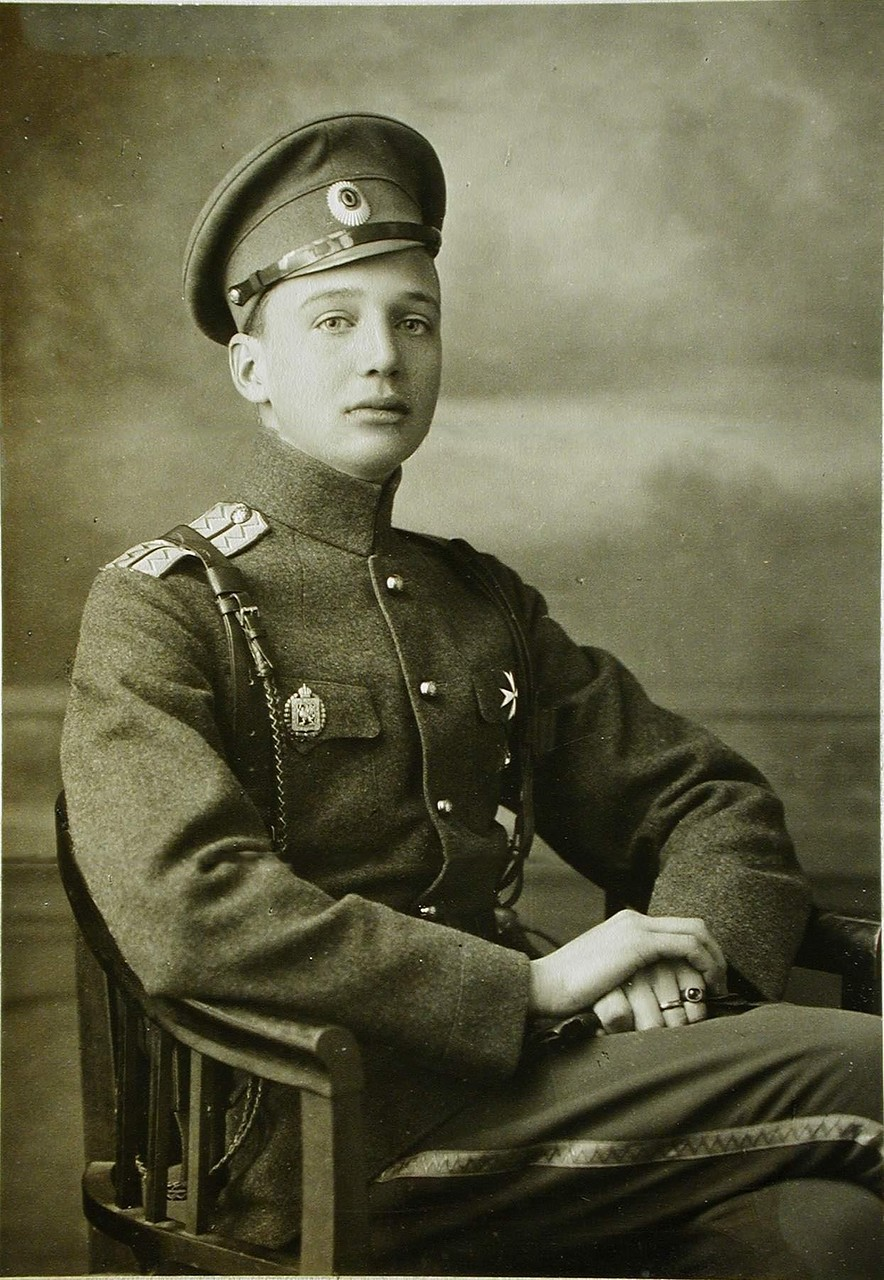
- Igor in the uniform of His Majesty’s Hussar Life Guards Regiment, 1913.
- Born: 10 June 1894; Saint Petersburg, Russian Empire
- Died: 18 July 1918 (aged 24); Alapayevsk, Russian SFSR
- Cause of death: Murder
- House: Holstein-Gottorp-Romanov
- Father: Grand Duke Constantine Constantinovich of Russia
- Mother: Princess Elisabeth of Saxe-Altenburg

Prince of the Imperial Blood Igor Konstantinovich of Russia (Russian: Игорь Константинович; 10 June 1894 – 18 July 1918) was the sixth child of Grand Duke Constantine Constantinovich of Russia by his wife Elisaveta Mavrikievna née Princess Elisabeth of Saxe-Altenburg.

== Biography ==
Igor was born on June 10, 1894, and attended the Corps des Pages, an imperial military academy in Saint Petersburg. He enjoyed theatre.

During World War I, he was a cornet in the His Majesty's Hussar Guards Regiment. His health was quite fragile: he had pleurisy and lung complications in 1915, and even if he returned to the trenches, he couldn't walk quickly and often coughed and spat blood.

On 4 April 1918, he was exiled to the Urals by the Bolsheviks and murdered in July the same year in a mineshaft near the town of Alapaevsk, along with his brothers Prince John Constantinovich and Prince Constantine Constantinovich, his cousin Prince Vladimir Pavlovich Paley and other relatives and friends. His body was eventually buried in the Russian Orthodox Church cemetery in Beijing, which was destroyed in 1986 and is now a parking lot.

== See also ==
- Romanov sainthood
- Martyrs of Alapayevsk

== Ancestors ==
Ancestors of Prince Igor Constantinovich of Russia

8. Nicholas I of Russia
4. Grand Duke Konstantin Nikolayevich of Russia
9. Princess Charlotte of Prussia
2. Grand Duke Konstantin Konstantinovich of Russia
10. Joseph, Duke of Saxe-Altenburg
5. Princess Alexandra of Saxe-Altenburg
11. Duchess Amelia of Württemberg
1. Prince Igor Constantinovich of Russia
12. George, Duke of Saxe-Altenburg
6. Prince Moritz of Saxe-Altenburg
13. Duchess Marie Louise of Mecklenburg-Schwerin
3. Princess Elisabeth of Saxe-Altenburg
14. Bernhard II, Duke of Saxe-Meiningen
7. Princess Augusta of Saxe-Meiningen
15. Princess Marie Frederica of Hesse-Kassel
