= Prince Constantine Constantinovich of Russia =

Russian prince (1891–1918)

Constantine Konstantinovich Romanoff
- Prince of the Imperial Blood
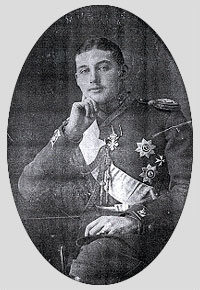
- Born: 1 January 1891; Saint Petersburg, Russian Empire
- Died: 18 July 1918 (aged 27); Alapayevsk, Russian SFSR
- Cause of death: Murder
- House: Holstein-Gottorp-Romanov
- Father: Grand Duke Konstantin Konstantinovich of Russia
- Mother: Princess Elisabeth of Saxe-Altenburg

Prince of the Imperial Blood Constantine Constantinovich of Russia (Russian: Константин Константинович; 1 January 1891 – 18 July 1918), nicknamed Kostya by the family, was the third son and fourth child of Grand Duke Konstantin Konstantinovich of Russia by his wife Grand Duchess Elizabeth Mavrikievna of Russia.

The Prince was a silent, shy person who fancied theatre and was educated in the Corps des Pages, a military academy in Saint Petersburg. He served in the army during the First World War. A priest who met him at the front, Hegumen Seraphim, wrote: "He was an extremely modest officer of the Guard of the Izmaylovsky Regiment, much beloved by officers and soldiers alike; along with them, he was a brave soldier who distinguished himself. I remember seeing him in the trenches among the soldiers, risking his life."

After seeing the happiness of his two elder siblings, John and Tatiana, Konstantin was keen to start his own family. He was interested in both the Tsar's eldest daughter, Olga, and Princess Elisabeth of Romania. In a letter written in 1911, Elisabeth's grandmother, the former Grand Duchess Maria Alexandrovna of Russia, wrote to her daughter, the Crown Princess Marie of Romania, saying, "The young Kostya is seized now with terror that she will be snatched away, as he says, before he has even made her acquaintance. The young man seems really quite nice, is much liked in his regiment, and they have been brought up well. This one is full of life...if you have nothing against this youth coming on a passing visit, will you telegraph to me." However, the request was denied on political grounds, as Prince John Konstantinovich was married to Princess Helen of Serbia, and as a result, Konstantin never did find the marriage he longed for.

In March 1918, he was exiled to the Urals by the Bolsheviks and murdered in a mineshaft near Alapayevsk, along with his brothers Prince John Constantinovich and Prince Igor Konstantinovich, his cousin Prince Vladimir Pavlovich Paley and other relatives and friends. His body was eventually buried in the Russian Orthodox Church cemetery in Beijing, which was destroyed in 1986 to build a park.

== Ancestry ==
Ancestors of Prince Constantine Constantinovich of Russia

8. Nicholas I of Russia
4. Grand Duke Constantine Nikolaevich of Russia
9. Princess Charlotte of Prussia
2. Grand Duke Constantine Constantinovich of Russia
10. Joseph, Duke of Saxe-Altenburg
5. Princess Alexandra of Saxe-Altenburg
11. Duchess Amelia of Württemberg
1. Prince Konstantin Konstantinovich of Russia
12. George, Duke of Saxe-Altenburg
6. Prince Moritz of Saxe-Altenburg
13. Duchess Marie Louise of Mecklenburg-Schwerin
3. Princess Elisabeth of Saxe-Altenburg
14. Bernhard II, Duke of Saxe-Meiningen
7. Princess Augusta of Saxe-Meiningen
15. Princess Marie Frederica of Hesse-Kassel

== See also ==
- Romanov sainthood
- Martyrs of Alapayevsk
