= List of grand dukes of Russia =

Male members of the Russian Imperial Family

Imperial standard of a grand duke

This is a list of those members of the Russian imperial family who bore the title velikiy knjaz (usually translated into English as grand duke, but more accurately grand prince). This courtesy title was borne by the sons and male-line grandsons of the Emperor of all the Russias, along with the style of His Imperial Highness. They were not sovereigns, but members and dynasts of the House of the reigning emperor.

The title grand prince is the English translation of the Russian великий князь. The Slavic knyaz and the Baltic kunigaitis (both nowadays usually translated as prince) is a cognate of king.

== Grand dukes by birth ==
Picture	Name	Father	Born	Died	Notes
	Peter Feodorovich	Charles Frederick, Duke of Holstein-Gottorp	21 February 1728	17 July 1762	succeeded as Emperor Peter III in 1762
	Pavel Petrovich	Peter Feodorovich	1 October 1754	23 March 1801	succeeded as Emperor Paul I in 1796
	Alexander Pavlovich	Pavel Petrovich	23 December 1777	1 December 1825	succeeded as Emperor Alexander I in 1801
	Konstantin Pavlovich	Pavel Petrovich	8 May 1779	27 June 1831	
	Nikolai Pavlovich	Pavel Petrovich	6 July 1796	2 March 1855	succeeded as Emperor Nicholas I in 1825
	Mikhail Pavlovich	Pavel Petrovich	8 February 1798	9 September 1849	
	Alexander Nikolaievich	Nikolai Pavlovich	17 April 1818	13 March 1881	succeeded as Emperor Alexander II in 1855
	Konstantine Nikolaievich	Nikolai Pavlovich	21 September 1827	29 January 1892	
	Nikolai Nikolaievich	Nikolai Pavlovich	8 August 1831	25 April 1891	
	Mikhail Nikolaievich	Nikolai Pavlovich	25 October 1832	18 December 1909	
	Nicholas Alexandrovich	Alexander Nikolaievich	20 September 1843	24 April 1865	
	Alexander Alexandrovich	Alexander Nikolaievich	10 March 1845	1 November 1894	succeeded as Emperor Alexander III in 1881
	Vladimir Alexandrovich	Alexander Nikolaievich	22 April 1847	17 February 1909	
	Alexei Alexandrovich	Alexander Nikolaievich	14 January 1850	14 November 1908	
	Nikolai Konstantinovich	Konstantine Nikolaievich	14 February 1850	14 January 1918	
	Nikolai Nikolaievich	Nikolai Nikolaievich	18 November 1856	5 January 1929	
	Sergei Alexandrovich	Alexander Nikolaievich	10 May 1857	17 February 1905	
	Konstantine Konstantinovich	Constantin Nikolaievich	22 August 1858	15 June 1915	
	Nikolai Mikhailovich	Mikhail Nikolaievich	26 April 1859	30 January 1919	
	Dimitri Konstantinovich	Konstantin Nikolaievich	13 June 1860	30 January 1919	
	Pavel Alexandrovich	Alexander Nikolaievich	11 October 1860	30 January 1919	
	Michael Mikhailovich	Mikhail Nikolaievich	16 October 1861	26 April 1929	
	Viatcheslav Konstantinovich	Konstantin Nikolaievich	13 July 1862	27 February 1879	
	George Mikhailovich	Mikhail Nikolaievich	23 August 1863	30 January 1919	
	Peter Nikolaievich	Nikolai Nikolaievich	22 January 1864	17 June 1931	
	Alexander Mikhailovich	Mikhail Nikolaievich	13 April 1866	26 February 1933	
	Nikolai Alexandrovich	Alexander Alexandrovich	6 May 1868	17 July 1918	succeeded as Emperor Nicholas II in 1894
	Alexander Alexandrovich	Alexander Alexandrovich	7 June 1869	2 May 1870	
	Sergei Mikhailovich	Mikhail Nikolaievich	7 October 1869	17/18 July 1918	
	George Alexandrovich	Alexander Alexandrovich	6 May 1871	9 August 1899	
	Alexander Vladimirovich	Vladimir Alexandrovich	31 August 1875	16 March 1877	
	Alexei Mikhailovich	Mikhail Nikolaievich	28 December 1875	1 March 1895	
	Kirill Vladimirovich	Vladimir Alexandrovich	30 September 1876	13 October 1938	
	Boris Vladimirovich	Vladimir Alexandrovich	24 November 1877	9 November 1943	
	Mikhail Alexandrovich	Alexander Alexandrovich	22 November 1878	13 July 1918	succeeded briefly and only titularly as Emperor Michael II in 1917
	Andrew Vladimirovich	Vladimir Alexandrovich	14 May 1879	30 October 1956	
	Ioann Konstantinovich	Konstantin Konstantinovich	5 July 1886	18 July 1918	Ioann Konstantinovich was born as a Grand Duke of Russia with the style Imperial Highness, but at the age of 9 days, an Ukaz of his cousin Emperor Alexander III of Russia stripped him of that title, as the Ukaz amended the House Law by limiting the grand-ducal title to grandsons of a reigning emperor. As a result, he received the title Prince of the Imperial Blood (Prince of Russia) with the style Highness
	Dmitri Pavlovich	Pavel Alexandrovich	18 September 1891	5 March 1941	
	Alexei Nikolaievich	Nicholai Alexandrovich	12 August 1904	17 July 1918	

== Grand dukes by pretence ==
Picture	Name	Father	Born	Died	Notes
	Vladimir Kirillovich	Kirill Vladimirovich	30 August 1917	21 April 1992	On 8 August 1922 Vladimir's father declared himself Curator of the Russian throne. Two years later on 31 August 1924 his father went a step further and assumed the title Emperor and Autocrat of all the Russias. With his father's assumption of the Imperial title Vladimir was granted the title of Tsesarevich (heir apparent) and Grand Duke with the style of Imperial Highness.
	Gabriel Constantinovich	Konstantin Konstantinovich	15 July 1887	28 February 1955	Gabriel Constantinovich kept in touch with his Romanov relatives during his long years in exile. He recognized Grand Duke Kirill Vladimirovich of Russia as Head of the Imperial House, and applied to Kirill for a title for his wife, to whom was granted the style of Her Serene Highness, Princess Romanovskaya-Strelninskaya. Gabriel himself was awarded the style of Grand Duke by Kirill's son Vladimir Kirillovich on 15 May 1939. He was the only Romanov prince to be elevated to this style.
	Mikhail Pavlovich	Prince Karl Franz of Prussia	3 September 1943		Franz Wilhelm married Grand Duchess Maria Vladimirovna of Russia, civilly on 4 September 1976 at Dinard and religiously on 22 September at the Russian Orthodox Chapel in Madrid. Before his marriage, he converted to the Russian Orthodox faith and was created a Grand Duke of Russia with the name Mikhail Pavlovich by his father-in-law Grand Duke Vladimir of Russia. Franz Wilhelm and Grand Duchess Maria had one son before divorcing on 19 June 1985 (they separated in 1982), at which point he reverted to his previous title.
	George Mikhailovich	Mikhail Pavlovich	13 March 1981		George Mikhailovich was born to Grand Duke Mikhail Pavlovich (Prince Franz Wilhelm of Prussia) and Grand Duchess Maria Vladimirovna of Russia. As the grandson of Grand Duke Vladimir Kirillovich, Head of the Imperial House of Russia, he was regarded from birth as a member of the imperial family. In keeping with the status previously granted to his father, he was recognized as a Grand Duke of Russia with the name George Mikhailovich. Through his father’s lineage, he also holds the hereditary title of Prince of Prussia, which he continues to bear.

== See also ==
- List of grand duchesses of Russia
