= Natalia Androsova =

Natalia Alexandrovna Iskander Romanova
- Princess Romanovskaya-Iskander of Russia
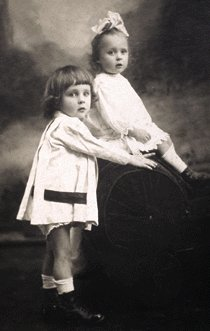
- Princess Natalia and her brother Prince Kirill, in Tashkent province, Soviet Union (now Uzbekistan) in 1919
- Born: 2 February 1917; Tashkent, Russian Empire
- Died: 25 July 1999 (aged 82); Moscow, Russian Federation
- Burial: Novodevichy Cemetery, Khamovniki District (Лужнецкий проезд, No. 2), Moscow, Russian Federation
- Spouse: Nicholas Vladimirovich Dostal (1909–1959)
Names
- Natalia Alexandrovna Iskander Romanova, Natalia Nikolaievna Androsova
- House: House of Holstein-Gottorp-Romanov
- Father: Alexander Nikolaevich Romanov, Prince Romanovsky-Iskander
- Mother: Olga Iosifovna Rogowska
- Religion: Eastern Orthodox

Princess Natalia Alexandrovna Romanovskaya-Iskander (Russian: княгиня Наталья Александровна Романовская-Искандер, romanized: knyaginya, Natalya Aleksandrovna Romanovskaya-Iskander; 2 February [O.S. 20 January] 1917 – 25 July 1999), or simply Princess Iskander, was the last of two members of the male line of the House of Romanov to remain alive in the Soviet Union following the Revolution and its aftermath.

== Early life ==
As the daughter of Prince Romanovsky-Iskander, né Alexander Nikolaevich Romanov, and his first wife, Olga Iosifovna Rogowska (b 1893; disappeared in the USSR; d c. 1962, daughter of Iosif Rogowski) Romanovskaya-Iskander was the granddaughter of Grand Duke Nicholas Constantinovich, the disgraced grandson of Tsar Nicholas I; thus, she was a patrilineal great-great-granddaughter of Nicholas I. Her date of birth is disputed, and has been reported as 10 February 1916, 3 February 1917, or 17 February 1910.

Grand Duke Constantine Nicholaevich's son, Grand Duke Nicholas Constantinovich, was exiled to Central Asia in disgrace for stealing his mother's diamonds. Grand Duke Nicholas established a palace in Tashkent and lived in grand style where he sired a son, whom Tsar Alexander III granted the title Prince Iskander (Iskander was the Arabic form of Alexander).

Prince Iskander, Alexander Nikolaievich (15 November 1887 N.S. – 26 January 1957), was granted the rank of a Noble of the Russian Empire by the Imperial Ukase 1889 and that of Hereditary Noble in 1899, and the title of Prince Romanovsky-Iskander with the qualification of Serene Highness by the Grand Duke Cyril Vladimirovich of Russia in 1925.

Natalia Androsova was born in Tashkent, a member of the Constantinovichi branch of the Russian Imperial Family. She had an older brother, Prince Kirill Romanovsky-Iskander (1914–1992). Her parents, who had married on 5 May 1912, separated. In 1924 Natalia and her brother moved with their mother to Moscow (first to Plyushchikha Street, later to Old Arbat), where Olga married Nicholas Androsov. Natalia's stepfather adopted her and her brother, so Princess Iskander was renamed Natalia Nikolaievna Androsova (Russian: Наталья Николаевна Андросова). Her father married Natalia Hanykova (b Saint Petersburg; 30/20 December 1893; d Nice 20 April 1982), dau of Maj.-Gen. Constantin Nikolaievich Hanykov and his wife Natalia Efimovna Markova, on 11 October 1930 in Paris.

== Ancestry ==
16. Nicholas I of Russia
8. Grand Duke Konstantin Nikolaevich of Russia
17. Princess Charlotte of Prussia
4. Grand Duke Nicholas Constantinovich of Russia
18. Joseph, Duke of Saxe-Altenburg
9. Princess Alexandra of Saxe-Altenburg
19. Duchess Amelia of Württemberg
2. Alexander Nikolaevich Romanov; (1887–1957)
20. Gustav von Dreyer
10. Alexander Gustavovich von Dreyer
21.
5. Nadejda Alexandrovna von Dreyer (1861–1929)
22. Ivan Opanovskoy
11. Sophia Ivanovna Opanovska
23.
1. Princess Natalia Alexandrovna Iskander
24.
12.
25.
6. Iosif (Joseph) Rogowski
26.
13.
27.
3. Olga Iosifovna Rogovskaya/Rogowska (1893–1962)
28.
14.
29.
7.
30.
15.
31.

Natalia Androsova
House of Holstein-Gottorp-Romanov
Cadet branch of the House of Oldenburg
Born: 2 February 1917 Died: 25 July 1999
Russian royalty
