= Kirill Romanov =

Kirill Romanov may refer to:

- Kirill Romanov (association football), Russian footballer
- Kirill Romanov (beach soccer), Russian beach soccer player
- Grand Duke Kirill Vladimirovich of Russia, claimant to the Russian throne
- Prince Kirill Romanovsky-Iskander, morganatic descendant of the House of Romanov
