= Grand Duke Dmitry Konstantinovich of Russia =

Russian grand duke (1860–1919)

Grand Duke Dmitry Konstantinovich
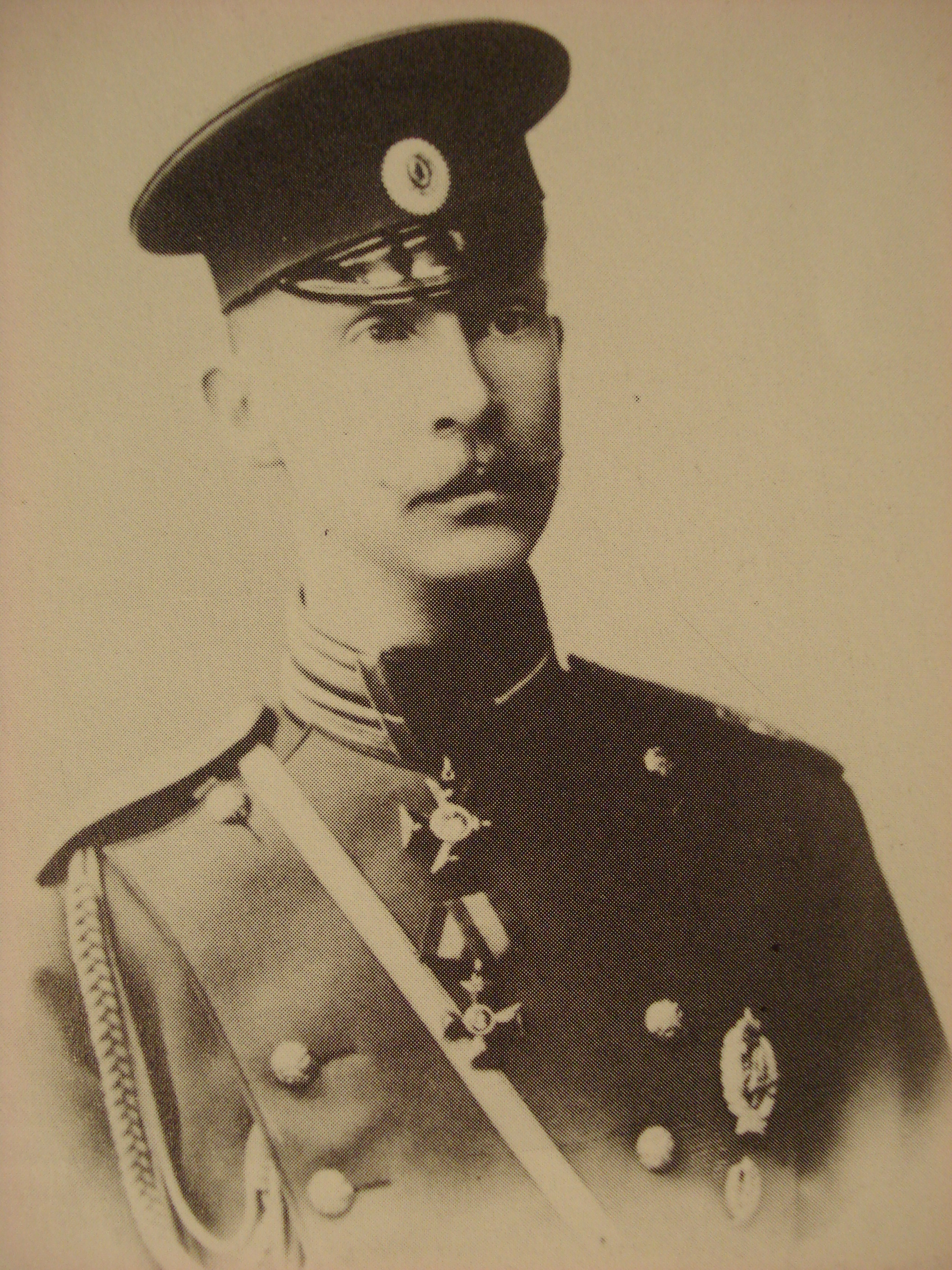
- Dmitry in 1885
- Born: 13 June 1860; Strelna, Saint Petersburg Governorate, Russian Empire
- Died: 28 January 1919 (aged 58); Petrograd, Russian Soviet Federative Socialist Republic
- Cause of death: Murder
- Burial: Saint Petersburg, Russia
- House: House of Holstein-Gottorp-Romanov
- Father: Grand Duke Konstantin Nikolayevich of Russia
- Mother: Princess Alexandra of Saxe-Altenburg

Grand Duke Dmitry Konstantinovich of Russia (Russian: Дми́трий Константи́нович; 13 June 1860 – 28 January 1919) was a son of Grand Duke Konstantin Nikolayevich and a first cousin of Alexander III of Russia. He followed a military career. Although he never played any political role, as a relative of Tsar Nicholas II, he was executed by firing squad at the walls of Peter and Paul Fortress during the Russian Civil War.

== Early life ==
Grand Duke Dmitry Konstantinovich was born at Strelna on 13 June 1860, the third son and fifth child of Grand Duke Konstantin Nikolayevich of Russia and Grand Duchess Alexandra Iosifovna, born Princess Alexandra of Saxe-Altenburg. When Dmitry turned 7 his education was turned over to Alexei Zelenoy, an officer who had served under his father in the Imperial Navy.

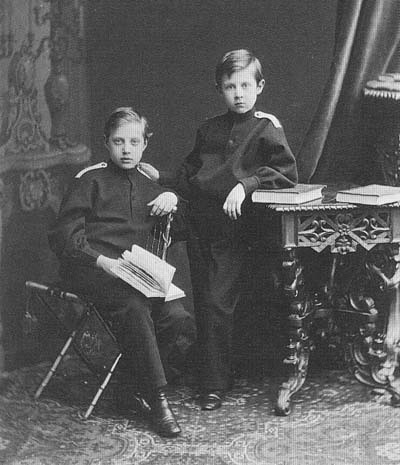
Grand Dukes Konstantin and Dmitry Konstantinovich

His lessons followed the usual course: science, arithmetic, Russian and world history, composition, and geography alternating languages and the arts. He learned besides Russian, French, German and English. Like all the male members of the Romanov family, he was destined from birth to follow a military career. At his christening, Dmitry was named honorary colonel in Chief, a month later he was enrolled in the Guard Equipage, and in the Imperial family's 4th Rifle Battalion Life Guards Infantry Regiment.

Dmitry's father, Grand Duke Konstantin Nikolayevich, was Admiral General of the Russian Navy and hoped one of his sons would follow in his footsteps. With this in mind, Dmitry received lessons in naval warfare and tactics. His religious education left a big imprint on him. He would be a deeply religious man all his life. As both of his parents were musical, he received singing lessons and learned to play the piano and the violin. Dmitry was a diligent and good student, polite and attentive, capable and kind. He was also very shy and introverted, preferring quiet times reading to more usual pursuits of childhood.

== Formative years ==
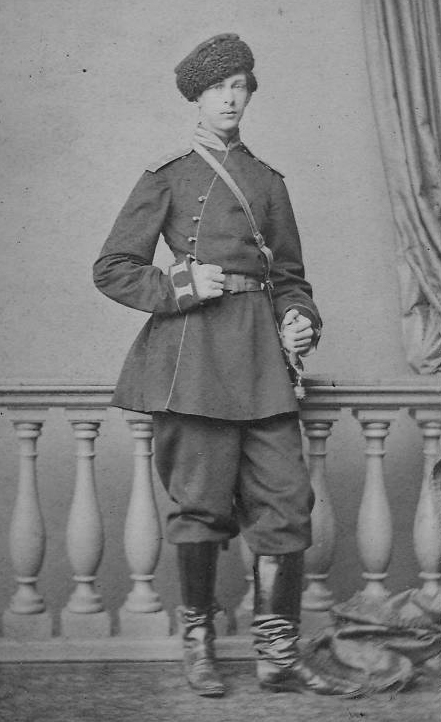
Grand Duke Dmitry in his early youth

His parents' marriage was unhappy and Dmitry was still a child when his father started a new family with his mistress, a Russian ballerina. A second family setback scared him even further. Dmitry was 14 when his eldest brother Nikolai Konstantinovich was disinherited, declared insane and sent into internal Russian exile, after stealing some diamonds from an icon in his mother's bedroom. Grand Duchess Alexandra Iosifovna made her three remaining sons (Konstantin, age 16, Dmitry, age 14, and Vyacheslav, age 12) promise her that they would never drink, never give themselves to a life of self-indulgence, and never forget that all the privileges of their wealth and rank were meant for use and not enjoyment. Brought up under these conditions, the younger Konstantinovich grand dukes grew into thoughtful, introspective men

At the age of 15, Dmitry, with his younger brother Vyacheslav, was enrolled as a cadet aboard the tender Kadetski. Together the two brothers underwent the rigors of life at sea. During their training cruises through the Gulf of Finland, they spent their time drilling, standing watch, and taking turns leading their fellow cadets. In 1877, the 17-year-old Dmitry made his first official public appearance as a member of the Imperial family, he joined Alexander II with his father and cousins Grand Duke Sergei and Grand Duke Paul Alexandrovich on a journey to southern Russia in the aftermath of the Russo-Turkish War (1877–1878).

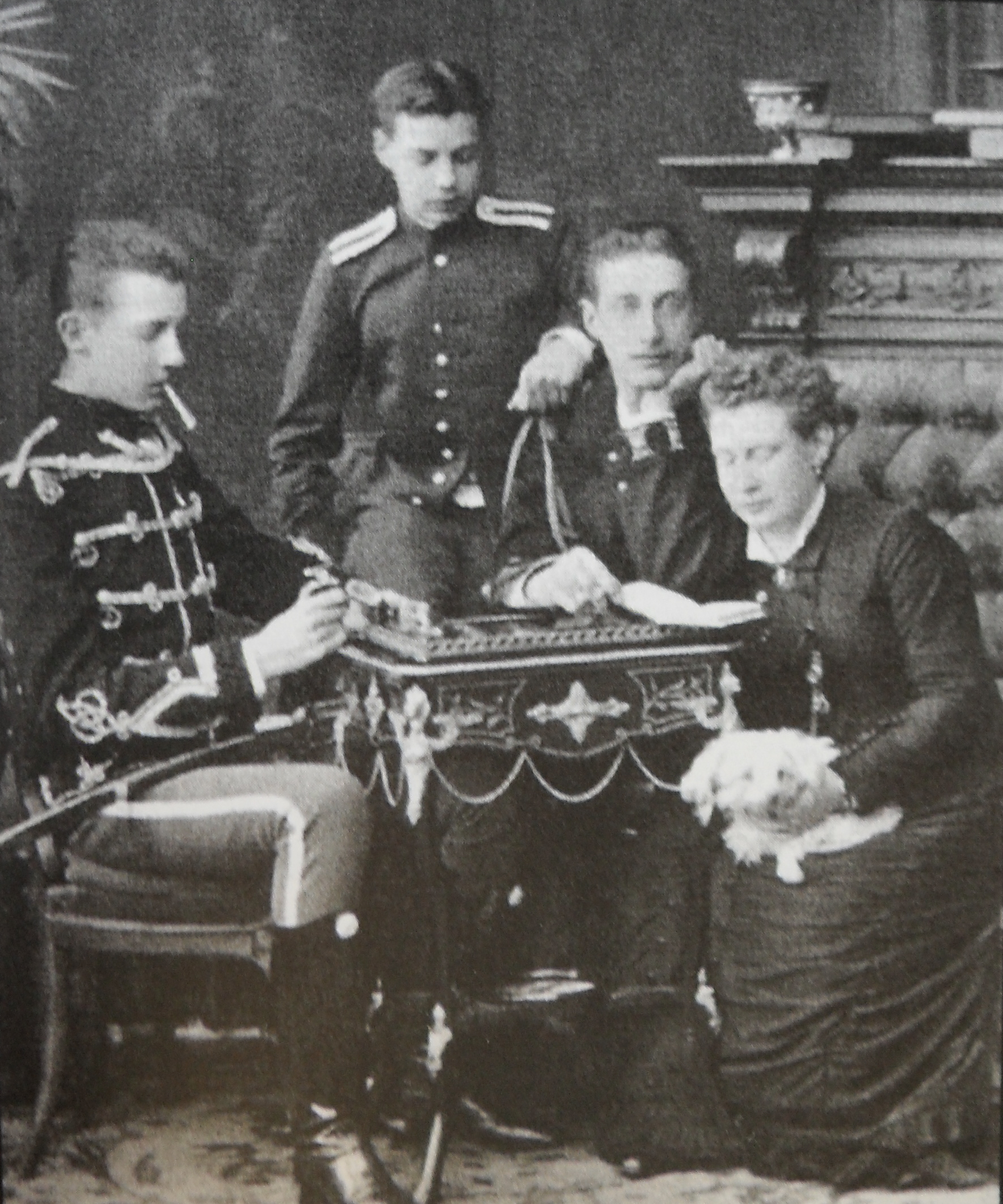
Grand Dukes Dmitry, Vyacheslav and Konstantin with their sister Grand Duchess Vera

Dmitry soon disappointed his father's wishes when he decided to abandon his career in the Navy in favor of the Imperial Army. He used the interval of an illness to ask his father to allow him to join the army. It was a blow to Konstantin to see his third consecutive son to leave the navy, but Dmitry begged his father and with the intervention of Alexandra Iosifovna, he was eventually allowed to leave the Navy and join the Horse Guards regiment in 1879.

Like his parents, Dmitry was musical; he had a particular love for Russian church music. In later years, he often sang in the chapel choirs at Strelna, the Marble Palace and the Pokrovsky Convent in Kiev. Duty stood at the core of his being and he was fiercely critical of a system, which pushed members of the Imperial family forward simply because of who they were. He believed that their promotions should be earned

Intensely shy, Dmitry preferred to avoid society, but on summer evenings at Petergof he often rode from Strelna to Znamenka, the house of his cousin, Grand Duke Pyotr where he was a welcome guest. Peter's wife, Grand Duchess Militsa, played the piano while Dmitry was usually persuaded to join in, accompanying with his own singing of Russian folk songs.

== Military career ==
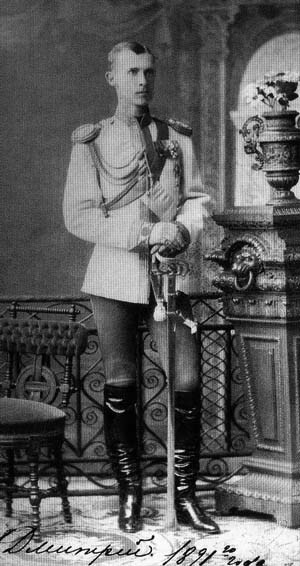
Grand Duke Dmitry, 1891

On 1 June 1880, Dmitry Konstantinovich was appointed to the suite of Alexander II and given the rank of Fligel-Adjutant. Six months later, after completing his initial infantry training, the grand duke was appointed lieutenant in the Horse Guards Regiment. He was to serve with the Horse Guards for twelve years as a junior officer, and finally as commander. After completing a training course with the General Staff Academy in 1880, Dmitry Konstantinovich was promoted to Ordnance Officer and scheduled to make his first official appearance, when he would deliver the report as an Imperial Adjutant in the Guards Sappers Cavalry Regiment. The date for his first appearance was Sunday, 1 March 1881. Two hours after the review, his uncle Alexander II, who had been present at the insistence of Alexandra Iosifovna, was assassinated.

In November 1881, Alexander III promoted Dmitry Konstantinovich to the position of Adjutant in the H. I. M. Retinue. Celebrating Dmitry's majority on 26 November of that year was delayed owing the assassination of Alexander II. The ceremony took place later and coincided with the Grand Duke Pavel Alexandrovich and Grand Duke Mikhail Mikhailovich taking an oath to the Emperor. Through the 1880s, Dmitry Konstantinovich served with his regiment with unceasing energy and an eye toward correcting grievances from his men. He built himself a two-storied dacha at Krasnoye Selo, equipping the property with stables and exercise yard for the horses. Here he spent the summers with his regiment; in spring and fall, he invariably invited his regimental officers to his Palace, Strelna, which he inherited on the death of his father in 1892. Mornings were spent riding through the park in which, the grand duke put his men and their horses through intricate maneuvers; after lunch, he would lead the officers on walks through the exquisite gardens.

On 6 April 1889, the grand duke was promoted to the rank of captain and given command of the 2nd Squadron of the Horse Guards. Three years later, on 10 December 1892, he was promoted to the rank of colonel and owing to his distinguished service, he was given command of the House Guards Grenadiers Regiment by Alexander III. Dmitry was a popular commander, and a tough and demanding officer. He took pride in his soldiers, and was greatly concerned with their welfare.

== Russian Grand Duke ==
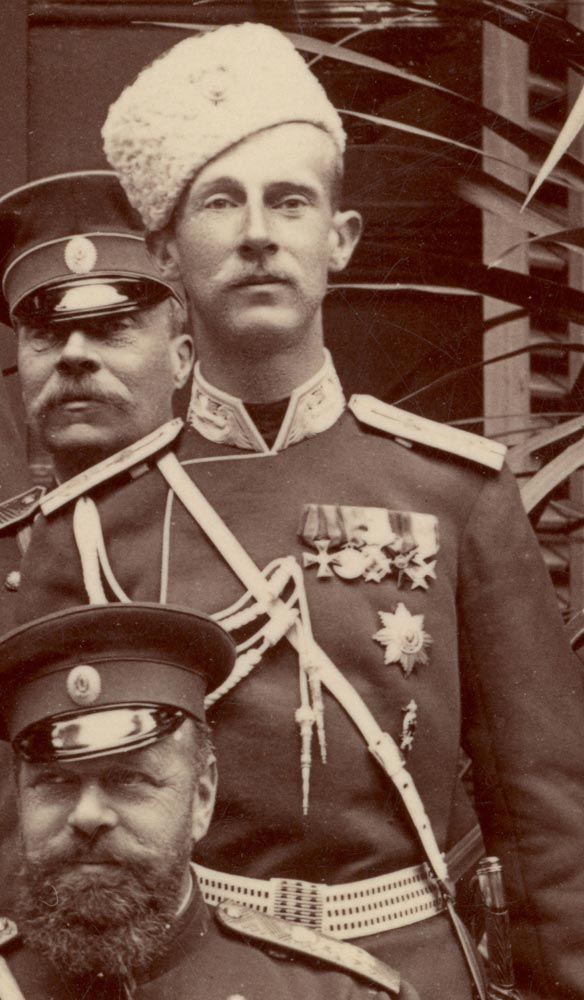
Grand Duke Dmitry. Standing behind Tsar Alexander III, 1893

Dmitry was very religious and he assumed responsibility for the church of the Apparition of the Virgin near Strelna, which was the regimental church of the Horse Grenadiers. He commissioned both an enlargement and a renovation program, which he paid for himself.

The grand duke's main residence was the Palace of Strelna, where he lived a quiet life and was his main residence until the revolution. He lived in a suite of rooms of the ground floor on the west wing that had previously been occupied by his father. He had the palace electrified, telephones were installed and modern plumbing provided for the bathroom and the kitchen.

Dmitry Konstantinovich was fair, with blond hair and blue eyes, and wore a small cavalry mustache. He was tall and lean with long legs and a long neck that increased his extraordinary height. In a family known for the height of its male members, Dmitry was among the tallest. Grand Duchess Militsa considered him "the nicest and best among the grand dukes". He was proper, dignified and very refined in his manners.

Alexander Mosolov, head of Nicholas II's Court Chancellery, described him as "full of good sense", remarking that Dmitry Konstantinovich "was the one among all the grand dukes who was most deeply imbued with the sense of his duty as a Prince and a cousin of the Emperor".

One day, the grand duke dispatched a hefty portion of his annual civil list income to support a struggling church. When Mosolov learnt of this he warned, " If you make gifts everywhere on this scale, your revenues will not last." But Dmitry Konstantinovich replied that the stipend was "not intended to enable us to live as sybarites; this money is put into our hands in order that we may augment the prestige of the Imperial family".

The grand duke was a lifelong bachelor, never involved in scandals. In his memoirs, his cousin Grand Duke Alexander Mikhailovich recalled that he was "a confirmed and enthusiastic woman-hater", then a term used for misogynists but also homosexuals. That Dimitry had close affectionate relationships with the female members of his family suggests the latter. He was adored by his family and especially by his young nieces and nephews, with whom he would happily play and ride for hours. He was particularly close to the children of his brother Konstantin. His nephew Prince Gabriel Konstantinovich remembered him, as a "wonderful, kind person" who was almost a second father and wherever they saw him, they ran across the room, jumping up to hug him and wrap their arms around his neck. Dmitry Konstantinovich also loved to tease the children and play practical jokes on them.

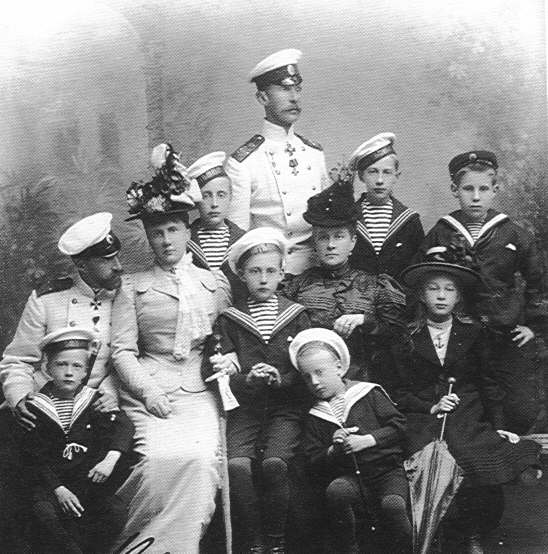
From left to right (sitting): Prince Oleg, Grand Duke Konstantin, Grand Duchess Yelizaveta Mavrikievna, Prince Konstantin, Olga, Queen of the Hellenes, Prince Igor, Princess Tatiana.(standing):Prince Gabriel, Grand Duke Dmitry, Prince Ioann and Prince Christopher of Greece.

Under Nicholas II, the grand duke received further promotions. On 26 May 1896, he was raised to the rank of Major-General, and three months later, he was named General à la suite in the Imperial Entourage. On 19 December 1904, Dmitry Konstantinovich was promoted to Lieutenant General and appointed Adjutant General to Nicholas II. Nicholas II also appointed the grand duke general director of the Imperial Stud in 1896. Despite his love of the military, it was this later post that struck the deepest chord in Dmitry Konstantinovich. On learning of his appointment, the grand duke – whom one courtier termed "timid beyond imagination" declared, " I should have eagerly accepted the appointment if it only meant looking after horse [...] I am afraid I shall never get on properly with officials."

Dmitry Konstantinovich was entranced with his new position, one of which demanded that he traveled across Russia and Europe, selecting the finest horses. Acting on his advice, the Imperial Stud purchased Galtee More, who had won the Derby in Great Britain, for an astronomical 200,000 rubles; as soon as he arrived in Russia, the thoroughbred was put to stud at Tsarskoye Selo. Dmitry Konstantinovich held the post until 1905, when he was replaced with Major-General Alexei Zdnovich. On 10 January 1904, Dmitry Konstantinovich relinquished command of the Horse Guard grenadiers Regiment. Although he would have been happy to remain in his post, his eyesight was failing rapidly, in detriment to his military career. Reluctantly he recognized that by remaining he was depriving another, more capable man of advancement. On leaving active service, the grand duke generously gave his dacha at Krasnoye Selo to the Horse Guards Regiment, to be used as an officer's club.

== Retirement ==
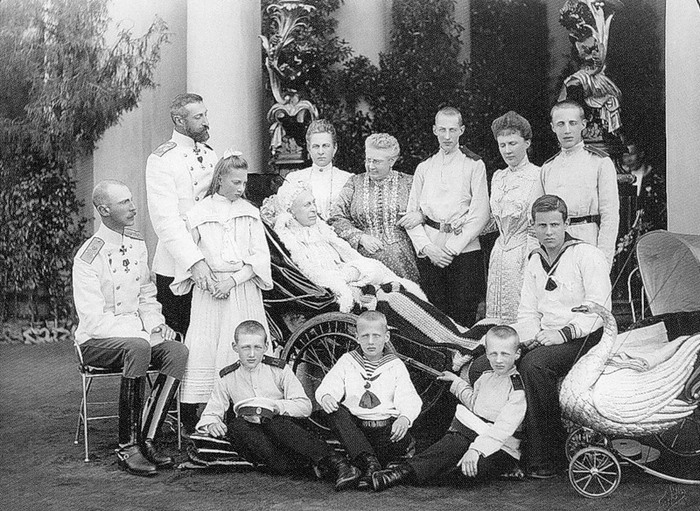
From left to right : Grand Duke Dmitry, Grand Duke Konstantin, Princess Tatiana, Grand Duchess Alexandra Iosifovna on a bath chair. On the floor Princes Konstantin, Igor and Oleg. standing in the back Queen Olga, Grand Duchess Vera, Prince Ivan, Grand Duchess Yelizaveta Maravkievana, Prince Gabriel and Prince Christopher of Greece on sailor suit.

The grand duke's retirement allowed him to focus solely on his passion for horses. Dmitry Konstantinovich created a model equestrian center, the Dubrovsky Stud farm, outside the Village of Mirgord, in the Poltava province. In 1911, Dmitry became president of the Imperial Society of Horse Racing, and was named Honorary president of the Russian society of Care and Protection of Animals. In the autumn of 1913, he inaugurated the Russian Imperial Horse Exposition in Kiev, and the first Russian Sport Competition, a kind of Slavic Olympic Games.

With time, the grand duke frequently retreated to Crimea, where he enjoyed the last, carefree years of the Romanov dynasty along the Black Sea shores. In 1907 he purchased a small plot of land at Gaspra in the Crimea, the following year he commissioned the construction of Kichkine, from the Tartar word "tiny Jewel". The villa was designed in Moorish style and built with local whitewashed stone. Here the grand duke and his guest spent many pleasant evenings watching the sunset over the Black Sea, unaware that the sun was also setting over their privileged way of life.

Dmitry's mother died in 1911, at her funeral the grand duke's poor eyesight became the source of temporary mirth at the end of the ceremony when he tried to kiss the icon his mother held in her hands. Unable to see clearly, he misjudged the distance and, bending forward to make his farewell, missed the open coffin completely, tumbling off the steps with a loud crash as his ceremonial saber and medals struck the stone floor. Relatives rushed to his side, but the grand duke appeared unfazed and went on as though nothing had happened.

== War and Revolution ==
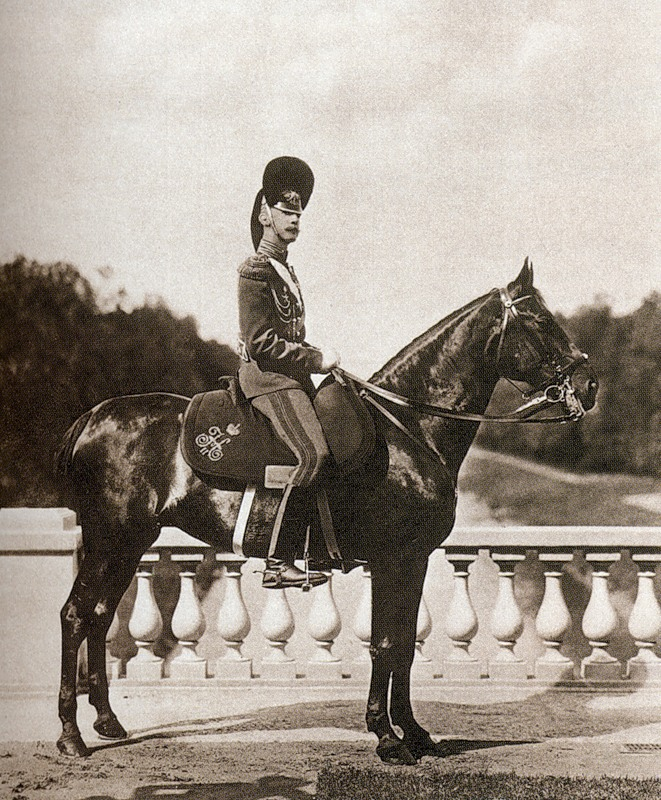
Grand Duke Dmitry at Strelna

Dmitry had anticipated a clash with Germany for years and was not surprised at the outbreak of World War I. By then, he was almost blind, which kept him from participating in the conflict, and he had to content himself with a job training the cavalry regiments away from the field of action.

Never meddling in politics, Dmitry Konstantinovich remained silent in the turmoil that preceded the fall of the Romanovs, believing it was not his place to offer unsolicited advice to Nicholas II. Dmitry was at his estate of Kichkin in Crimea when he learned that Rasputin had been murdered. He was outraged that members of the Imperial family, among them his sister Olga, Queen of the Hellenes, had signed and sent a plea for leniency on behalf of Grand Duke Dmitry Pavlovich to the Emperor. He said that had he been in Petrograd at the time, he would have never signed the letter.

The grand duke was in Petrograd when the revolution broke out in late February 1917. In spite of the uncertainty of the times, he had purchased a large mansion on Petrogradsky Quay in Petrograd. He was staying there when he learned of Nicholas II's abdication and the declaration of the provisional government. After the fall of his family from power, he lived quietly, in obscurity, depending largely on Alexander Koronchentzov, his trusted Adjutant, for the necessities of daily life. His niece Princess Tatiana, who had lost her husband during the war, was living with him.

== Internal exile ==
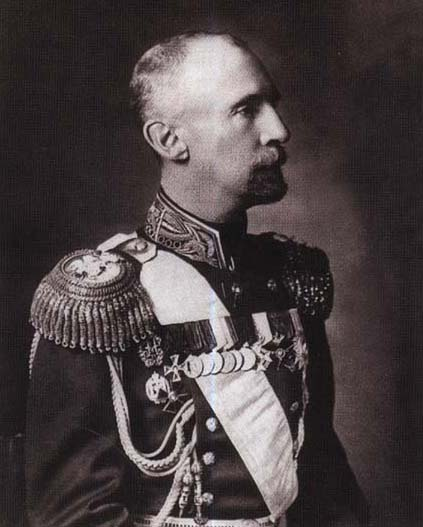
Grand Duke Dmitry Konstantinovich

After the successful October Revolution of November 1917, the Petrograd newspapers published a decree summoning all the Romanovs to report to the dreaded Cheka, the secret police. Initially they were just required not to leave the city. In March 1918 the Romanovs registered were summoned again now to be sent away. Dmitry went accompanied by Colonel Alexander Korochenzov, his adjutant and his niece Princess Tatiana Constantinovna, who insisted in going with him to ensure that he was not alone and subjected to unwanted pressure.

The Bolshevik leader of Petrograd, Grigory Zinoviev, decided to send the male members of the Romanov family into internal Russian exile. Fearing the eventual occupation of Petrograd by the Germans, they moved the capital to Moscow. Dmitry was offered a choice for exile: Vologda, Olonets, or Vyatka. He chose Vologda, the closest city to the former Imperial Capital. On 18 April, Dmitry, carrying a suitcase and in the company of his niece, Princess Tatiana, her two children, the children's nanny, and his Adjutant Colonel Korochentzov, boarded a train and left Petrograd for exile.

In Vologda, Dmitry Konstantinovich took two rooms in a house owned by a local merchant, just opposite the river. He lived in one room with Colonel Korochentzov, while Tatiana and the children occupied the other. They were not registered in their movement, and were able to walk about town at will. Shortly after they arrival, they learned that Grand Dukes Nicholas and Georgy Mikhailovich had also been exiled to the town. The prisoners enjoyed relative freedom; aside from having to report to Cheka Headquarters once a week, they could come and go as they wished, and took long walks around the town, visiting and dining with each other frequently. In the middle of May, Colonel Alexander von Leiming, one of Dmitry Konstantinovich's adjutants, arrived in Vologda with news that passage had been prepared to Finland, but the grand duke refused to leave Russia

This quiet and uncertain situation was abruptly interrupted on 14 July, two days before the murder of Nicholas II and his family. That morning a car with four heavily armed men arrived and collected the Grand Dukes from their lodgings; they were transported to a small, walled village, where they could be more easily guarded. Grand Duke Georgy wrote to his wife in England, "We were each given a cell, and later on were joined by Dmitry. I saw him arriving through the iron bars of my window, and was struck by his sad expression. The first twenty-four hours were hard, but after that, they luckily allowed us to have our camp beds and also our clothes. There is no one in the prison but we three". They were guarded by soldiers from the Baltic provinces. "They treat us like comrades, and have not locked our cells after the second day, while they allow us to walk in the small garden in the courtyard. Our food is brought from outside". While imprisoned, they learned that Nicholas II and his family had been killed; this seemed to indicate the worst and princess Tatiana left Vologda with her two young children to return to Petrograd. Then on 21 July, all of the exiled Grand Dukes in Vologda were again transferred back to Petrograd. In the former Imperial capital, the men were quickly imprisoned with six other detainees in a cell at Cheka Headquarters.

== Captivity ==
Dmitry Konstantinovich lived a quiet life devoid of scandal and controversy.

Upon arrival, Dmitry Konstantinovich and the other grand dukes were questioned at length by Moisei Uritsky, the Chairman of the Petrograd Cheka. Grand Duke Georgy wrote " Dmitry asked Uritsky why we were imprisoned, and his answer was that it was to save us as the people intended shooting us at Vologda", an explanation hard to believe. The prisoners were photographed, and then moved to the Kresty prison.

Shortly thereafter, they were transferred to Shpalernaya prison, where they would remain for most of their incarceration. Here each had his own private cell, if only seven feet long and three feet wide. Their only furniture was a hard iron bed. The Grand Dukes were permitted to exercise a half-hour to 45 minutes twice a day, although the personal contact allowed in Vologda was denied them here at first. Their wardens, all of whom were soldiers, treated them well; they even helped the grand dukes smuggle out letters. After several days they were all allowed to gather in the courtyard and were permitted some provisions from the outside such as fresh linens and cigarettes. Their day began at 7 am when they were awakened by the steps in the hall of their jailers and the clank of their keys in the door. Lunch was served at noon, which consisted of dirty hot water with a few fish bones in it and black bread. The lights were turned on in the cells at 7 pm, although as the winter approached, the prisoners had to sit in darkness until that time. The meetings of the grand dukes during exercise gave them opportunity to exchange a few words.

Prince Gavril Konstantinovich was in a cell adjoining theirs; he was shocked at his uncle Dmitry's appearance when they were first reunited. Until the last, Gavril recalled, Dmitry was the cheerful favorite uncle of his childhood, telling him jokes, attempting to raise the spirits, and bribing prison Guards to carry hopeful messages to his nephew's cell. Some of their relatives made frantic efforts in their behalf to obtain their release through Maxim Gorky who was sympathetic and asked Lenin to set them free. Near the end of 1918, Prince Gavril, who was sick, was eventually permitted to leave and found his way out of Russia.

On 9 January 1919, the Presidium of the Cheka in a meeting chaired by Martin Latsis, Yakov Peters, Ivan Ksenofontov and secretary O. Ya. Murnek, issued a resolution "The verdict of the Cheka to persons of the former imperial pack – to approve, informing the Central Executive Committee about it". The grand dukes were to be shot by the order of the Presidium of the VChk in the Peter and Paul Fortress in Petrograd in January 1919 as hostages in response to the murders of Karl Liebknecht and Rosa Luxemburg in Germany.

Colonel von Leiming regularly sent food each day for Grand Duke Dmitry; on 29 January 1919, it was returned to him with a note the grand duke was no longer being held prisoner. The following day he learned that he had been executed.

== Murder ==
There are no eyewitness accounts of the execution. What is known is based on versions that are derived from rumors and second hand information. They vary on the details, some have an overly dramatic air about them, but they all have a similar ring.

At 11:30 pm on the night of 27–28 January, guards awoke Grand Dukes Dmitry Konstantinovich, and Nikolai Mikhailovich and Georgy Mikhailovich, in their cells at Shpalernaya prison, telling them that they were going to be moved and they had to pack their belongings. They initially assumed that they were going to be transported to Moscow. Grand Duke Nikolai Mikhailovich even thought that they might set free, but his brother Georgy said that it was more likely they were heading to another place to be shot. The Grand Dukes had an ominous hint of what was going to happen to them, when at the time of departure, they were told to leave their luggage.

The grand dukes were taken outside and loaded into a truck that already held four common criminals and six Red Guardsmen. At 1:20 am on 28 January they left the prison. They drove towards the river by the fields of Mars, where the truck stalled. While the driver was trying to restart it, one of the convicts tried to run and was shot in the back as he fled. The truck eventually began running again, and they drove to the fortress set up at the Saint Peter and Saint Paul Cathedral. The prisoners were roughly pushed from the truck into the Trubetskoy bastion. They were told to remove their shirts and coats, despite the fact that it was almost 20 degrees (Fahrenheit) below zero. By then they had no doubt what was about to occur and the grand Dukes embraced each other for the last time.

Some different soldiers appeared carrying another person, whom the grand dukes finally recognized as their cousin Grand Duke Pavel Alexandrovich. They were then each escorted arm in arm with a soldier on each side towards a trench that had been dug in the courtyard. As they passed the cathedral of Saint Peter and Saint Pavel where their ancestors were buried, the Grand Dukes crossed themselves. The prisoners were lined up before the ditch, in which there were already 13 bodies, Nikolai Mikhailovich who had been carrying his cat, handed it to a soldier asking him to look after it. All of the grand dukes faced death with the greatest courage. Georgy and Dmitry prayed quietly, Dmitry for the forgiveness of his murderers "Forgive them, for they know not what they do" seemed to be his last words. Pavel, who was very sick, was shot on a stretcher. Grand Dukes Nikolai, Georgy and Dmitry were killed by the same blast. The fusillade of shots sent their bodies reeling into the trench.

Although the bodies of the other three grand dukes were thrown into a mass grave within the fortress, that of Dmitry Konstantinovich was secretly collected the next morning by his devoted former Adjutant, von Leiming, rolled up in a rug and taken away for a private burial in the garden of a house in Petrograd, where he remains to this day.

== Honours and awards ==
The Grand Duke received several Russian and foreign decorations:

Russian

- Knight of the Order of St. Andrew
- Knight of the Order of Saint Alexander Nevsky
- Knight of the Order of St. Anna
- Knight (1st Class) of the Order of Saint Stanislaus
- Knight of the Order of the White Eagle

Foreign

- Grand Cross of the Order of the Württemberg Crown, 1874 (Kingdom of Württemberg)
- Knight of the Order of the Black Eagle, 14 September 1879 (Kingdom of Prussia)
- Grand Cross of the Order of Prince Danilo I, 1882 (Principality of Montenegro)
- Grand Cross of the Ludwig Order, 15 June 1884 (Grand Duchy of Hesse and by Rhine)
- Grand Cross of the Order of the White Falcon, 1896 (Saxe-Weimar-Eisenach)
- Grand Cross of the Legion of Honour, June 1902 (France)
- Knight of the Order of the Most Holy Annunciation – July 1902 – during a visit to Russia of King Victor Emmanuel III of Italy
- Grand Cross of the Order of Saint Sava (Kingdom of Serbia)
- Grand Cross of the Order of the Cross of Takovo (Kingdom of Serbia)

== Ancestry ==
Ancestors of Grand Duke Dmitry Konstantinovich of Russia

8. Paul I of Russia
4. Nicholas I of Russia
9. Sophie Dorothea of Württemberg
2. Grand Duke Konstantin Nikolayevich of Russia
10. Frederick William III of Prussia
5. Charlotte of Prussia
11. Louise of Mecklenburg-Strelitz
1. Grand Duke Dmitry Konstantinovich of Russia
12. Frederick, Duke of Saxe-Altenburg
6. Joseph, Duke of Saxe-Altenburg
13. Duchess Charlotte Georgine of Mecklenburg-Strelitz
3. Princess Alexandra of Saxe-Altenburg
14. Duke Louis of Württemberg
7. Duchess Amelia of Württemberg
15. Princess Henriette of Nassau-Weilburg

== Bibliography ==
- Alexander, Grand Duke of Russia, Once a Grand Duke, Cassell, London, 1932.
- Chavchavadze, David, The Grand Dukes, Atlantic, 1989, ISBN 0-938311-11-5
- Cockfield, Jamie H. White Crow: The Life and Times of the Grand Duke Nicholas Mikhailovich Romanov, 1859-1919. Praeger, 2002, ISBN 0-275-97778-1
- Van der Kiste, John, The Romanovs 1818–1959, Sutton Publishing, 1999, ISBN 0-7509-2275-3.
- Zeepvat, Charlotte, Romanov Autumn , Sutton Publishing, 2000, ISBN 0-7509-2739-9
