= Prince Kirill Romanovsky-Iskander =

Kirill Alexandrovich Iskander Romanov
- Prince Romanovsky-Iskander of Russia
- Born: 5 December 1914; Tashkent, Russian Empire
- Died: 1992 (aged 77–78); Moscow, Russian Federation
Names
- Kirill Alexandrovich Iskander Romanov, Kirill Nikolaievich Androsov
- House: House of Holstein-Gottorp-Romanov
- Father: Alexander Nikolaevich Romanov, Prince Romanovsky-Iskander
- Mother: Olga Iosifovna Rogowska
- Religion: Eastern Orthodox

Prince Kirill Alexandrovich Romanovsky-Iskander, or Cyril Iskander Romanov (Russian: князь, Кирилл Александрович Искандер, romanized: knyaz, Kirill Alexandrovich Iskander) (5 December 1914 – 1992), or simply Prince Iskander, was one of the last two members of the House of Romanov to remain alive in Russia following the Revolution.

== Family ==
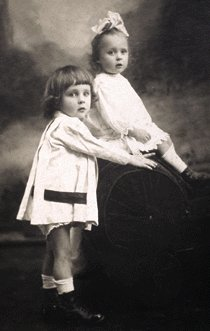
Prince Kirill and his sister Princess Natalia, in Tashkent province, Soviet Union (now Uzbekistan) in 1919

He was the son of Prince Romanovsky-Iskander (15 November 1887 N.S. – 26 January 1957), né Alexander Nikolaevich Romanov, and his first wife, Olga Iosifovna Rogowska. He was a grandson of Grand Duke Nicholas Constantinovich, the disgraced grandson of Tsar Nicholas I; thus, Kirill was a patrilineal great-great-grandson of Nicholas I.

Grand Duke Constantine Nicholaevich's son, Grand Duke Nicholas Constantinovich, was exiled to Central Asia in disgrace for stealing his mother's diamonds. Grand Duke Nicholas established a palace in Tashkent and lived in grand style where he sired a son, whom Tsar Alexander III (his great-uncle) granted the title Prince Iskander (Iskander was the Arabic form of Alexander). This prince, in turn, fathered the Prince Iskander.

His second cousins were Prince Michael of Greece and Denmark and Prince Philip, Duke of Edinburgh.

== Early life ==
He was born in Tashkent, as a member of the Constantinovichi branch of the Russian Imperial Family. He had a sister, Princess Natalia Romanovskaya-Iskander (1917 - 1999). Their parents, who had been married since 1912, divorced. In 1924 Kirill and his sister moved with their mother to Moscow (first moved to Plyushchikha Street, later to Arbat), where Olga remarried to Nicholas Androsov.

Kirill's stepfather adopted him and his sister, and Prince Iskander was renamed Kirill Nikolaievich Androsov (Russian: Кирилл Николаевич Андросов). His father also remarried, to Natalia Hanykova (30 December 1893 – 20 April 1982), in 1930 in Paris.

== Adult life ==
After the Russian Revolution, Kirill and his sister Natalia were the only two Romanov descendants in the male line in the USSR; the rest either left or were killed. They lived their entire lives in the USSR. Upon Kirill's death, the male line of the Constantinovich branch of the Romanov family died out.

Styles of Prince Kirill Romanovsky-Iskander
- Reference style: His Serene Highness
- Spoken style: Your Serene Highness

== Ancestry ==
Ancestors of Prince Kirill Romanovsky-Iskander

16. Nicholas I of Russia
8. Grand Duke Konstantin Nikolaevich of Russia
17. Princess Charlotte of Prussia
4. Grand Duke Nicholas Constantinovich of Russia
18. Joseph, Duke of Saxe-Altenburg
9. Princess Alexandra of Saxe-Altenburg
19. Duchess Amelia of Württemberg
2. Alexander Nikolaievich, Prince Iskander
20. Gustav von Dreyer
10. Alexander Gustavovich von Dreyer
5. Nadejda von Dreyer
22. Ivan Opanovskoy
11. Sophia Ivanovna Opanovska
1. Kirill Alexandrovich, Prince Iskander
6. Iosif Rogowski
3. Olga Iosifovna Rogowska

Prince Kirill Romanovsky-Iskander House of Holstein-Gottorp-Romanov Cadet branch of the House of Oldenburg Born: 5 December 1914 Died: 1992
Russian royalty
Titles in pretence
Preceded by Alexander Nikolaievich, Prince Romanovsky-Iskander	— TITULAR — Prince Romanovsky-Iskander of Russia; 1957 – 1992; Reason for succession failure: 1917 revolution	Succeeded by Natalia Alexandrovna, Princess Romanovskaya-Iskander
