= Grand Ducal Burial Vault =

Mausoleum in the Peter and Paul Fortress, Russia

Coordinates: 59°57′02″N 30°19′02″E

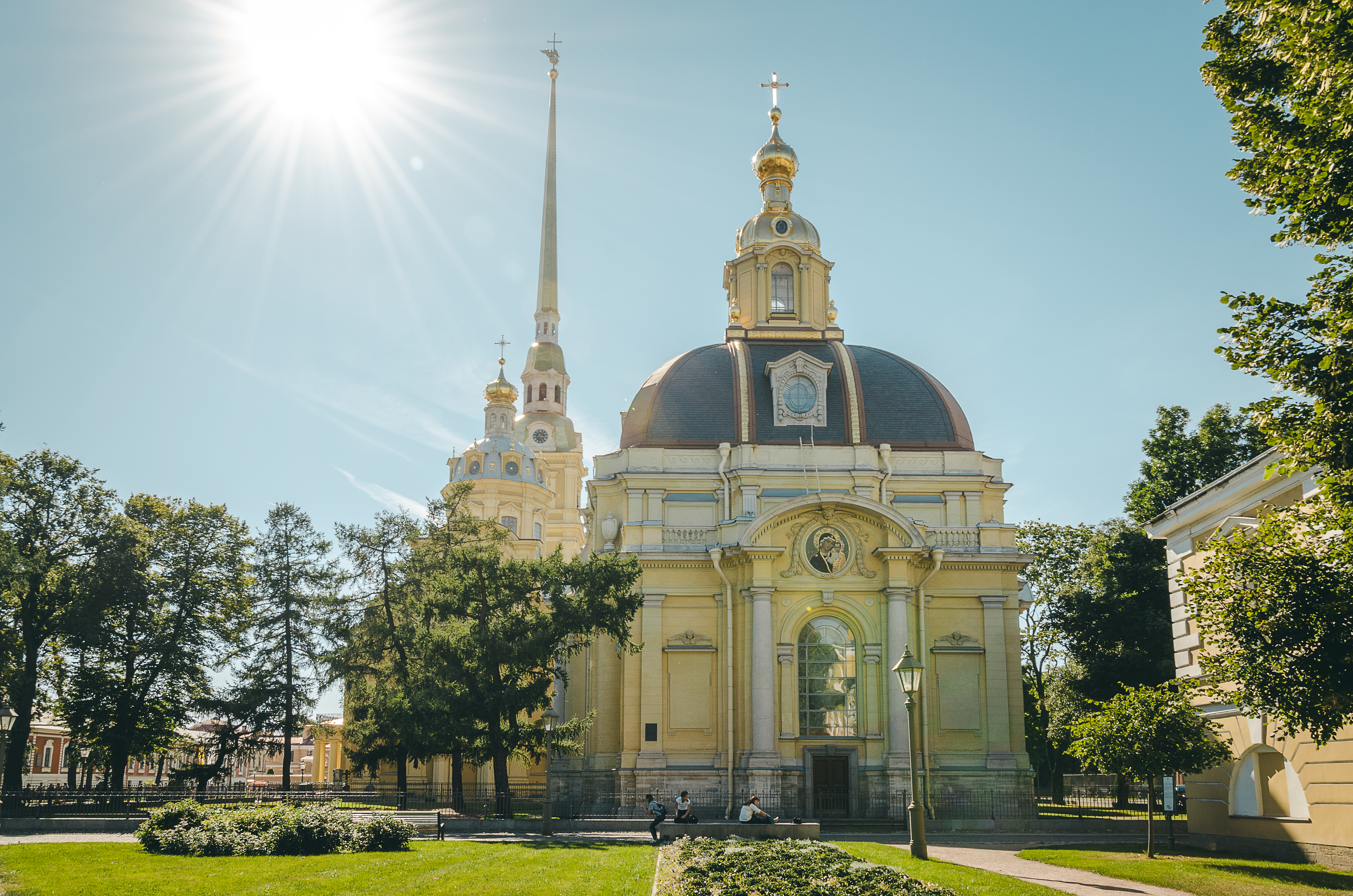
The grand ducal vault is a small domed structure next to the Peter and Paul Cathedral

The Grand Ducal Burial Vault (Russian: Великокняжеская усыпальница) is the purpose-built mausoleum of the Grand Dukes and Duchesses of Russia in the Peter and Paul Fortress. The Neo-Baroque domed structure is frequently mistaken for a part of the Peter and Paul Cathedral due to architectural similarities. A covered passageway leads from the mausoleum to the cathedral, where the Russian emperors and empresses are buried.

The building was designed by David Grimm in 1896. It was constructed in order to remove the remains of some of the non-reigning Romanovs from the cathedral, where there was scarcely any room for new burials. Antony Tomishko and Leon Benois were responsible for the actual construction work. The interior is richly decorated with marble, mosaics and ormolu.

The mausoleum was expected to hold up to sixty tombs, but by the time of the Russian Revolution there were only thirteen. The Soviets destroyed the uniform tombs with a view to converting the building into a city history museum; the tombs were later restored.

== Burials ==
- Grand Duke Alexei Alexandrovich (1850 - 1908)
- Grand Duke Alexander Vladimirovich (1875 - 1877), transferred from the Peter and Paul Cathedral
- Grand Duke Konstantin Nikolaievich (1827 - 1892), transferred from the Peter and Paul Cathedral
- Grand Duke Vyacheslav Konstantinovich (1862 - 1879), transferred from the Peter and Paul Cathedral
- Grand Duchess Alexandra Nikolaevna, Princess Frederick William of Hesse-Kassel (1825 - 1879), transferred from the Peter and Paul Cathedral
- Princess Natalia Konstantinova (born and died 1905), transferred from the Peter and Paul Cathedral
- Grand Duchess Maria Nikolaevna, Duchess of Leuchtenberg (1819 - 1879), transferred from the Peter and Paul Cathedral
- Prince Sergei Maximilianovich of Leuchtenberg (1819 - 1876), transferred from the Peter and Paul Cathedral
- Princess Alexandra Maximilianovna of Leuchtenberg (1840 - 1843), transferred from the Peter and Paul Cathedral
- Grand Duke Vladimir Alexandrovich (1847 - 1909)
- Grand Duchess Alexandra Iosifovna (1830 - 1911)
- George Maximilianovich, 6th Duke of Leuchtenberg (1852 - 1912)
- Grand Duke Konstantin Konstantinovich (1858 - 1915), last pre-revolution burial
- Grand Duke Vladimir Kirillovich (1917 - 1992)
- Grand Duke Kirill Vladimirovich (1876 - 1938), transferred from Schloss Rosenau, Coburg in 1995
- Grand Duchess Victoria Feodorovna (1876 - 1936), transferred from Schloss Rosenau, Coburg in 1995
- Grand Duchess Leonida Georgievna (1914 - 2010)
