= Grand Duke Vyacheslav Konstantinovich of Russia =

Russian grand duke (1862–1879)

Grand Duke Vyacheslav Konstantinovich
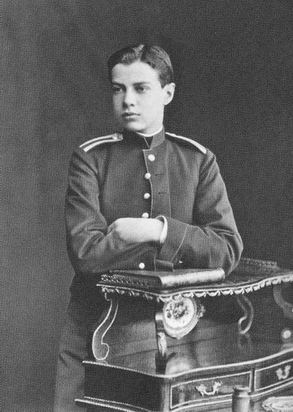
- Born: 13 July 1862; Warsaw, Warsaw Governorate, Congress Poland
- Died: 27 February 1879 (aged 16); Saint Petersburg, Russian Empire
- Burial: Grand Ducal Mausoleum
- House: House of Holstein-Gottorp-Romanov
- Father: Grand Duke Konstantin Nikolayevich of Russia
- Mother: Princess Alexandra of Saxe-Altenburg

Grand Duke Vyacheslav Konstantinovich of Russia (13 July 1862 – 27 February 1879) was a Romanov grand duke and the youngest son of Grand Duke Konstantin Nikolayevich of Russia and his wife Princess Alexandra of Saxe-Altenburg. The English form of his first name is Wenceslas.

== Biography ==
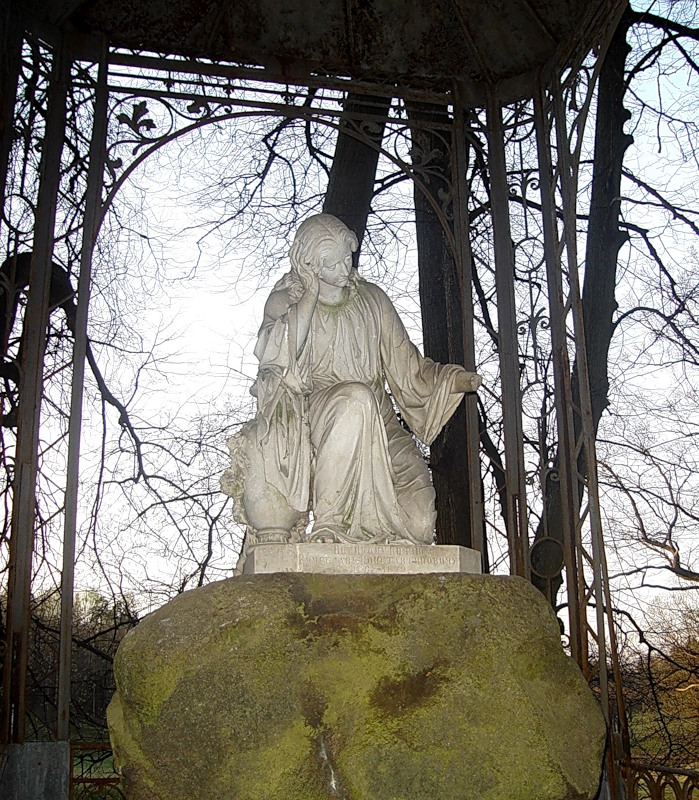
Grand Duke Vyacheslav's monument in Pavlovsk Palace.

Vyacheslav, who was nicknamed "Slava," was the baby of the family and a family favorite. He was tall and used to joke that, when he died, his coffin would get stuck in a doorway of the Marble Palace. It really happened so when he died. At age sixteen, he complained suddenly of a splitting headache and violent illness. He lay with a Russian Orthodox icon on his pillow as his family surrounded him, urging him to breathe. He died within a week of brain inflammation. His mother later reported that she had seen the ghost of a white lady in the art gallery at Pavlovsk Palace on the day before Vyacheslav became ill. She took the apparition as a portent of death. His brother Grand Duke Constantine Constantinovich of Russia later recalled, as he walked in Vyacheslav's funeral procession, how much Vyacheslav enjoyed drawing funeral processions in great detail.

== Orders and decorations ==
- Württemberg: Grand Cross of the Württemberg Crown, 1874

== Ancestry ==
Ancestors of Grand Duke Vyacheslav Konstantinovich of Russia

16. Peter III of Russia
8. Paul I of Russia
17. Catherine II of Russia
4. Nicholas I of Russia
18. Frederick II Eugene, Duke of Württemberg (= 28)
9. Sophie Dorothea of Württemberg
19. Margravine Friederike of Brandenburg-Schwedt (= 29)
2. Grand Duke Konstantin Nikolayevich of Russia
20. Frederick William II of Prussia
10. Frederick William III of Prussia
21. Frederika Louisa of Hesse-Darmstadt
5. Charlotte of Prussia
22. Charles II, Grand Duke of Mecklenburg-Strelitz (= 26)
11. Louise of Mecklenburg-Strelitz
23. Princess Friederike of Hesse-Darmstadt (= 27)
1. Grand Duke Vyacheslav Konstantinovich of Russia
24. Ernest Frederick III, Duke of Saxe-Hildburghausen
12. Frederick, Duke of Saxe-Altenburg
25. Princess Ernestine of Saxe-Weimar
6. Joseph, Duke of Saxe-Altenburg
26. Charles II, Grand Duke of Mecklenburg-Strelitz (= 22)
13. Duchess Charlotte Georgine of Mecklenburg-Strelitz
27. Princess Friederike of Hesse-Darmstadt (= 23)
3. Princess Alexandra of Saxe-Altenburg
28. Frederick II Eugene, Duke of Württemberg (= 18)
14. Duke Louis of Württemberg
29. Margravine Friederike of Brandenburg-Schwedt (= 19)
7. Duchess Amelia of Württemberg
30. Charles Christian, Prince of Nassau-Weilburg
15. Princess Henriette of Nassau-Weilburg
31. Princess Carolina of Orange-Nassau
