= Kirill Romanov (footballer) =

Russian footballer

Personal information
- Full name: Kirill Valeryevich Romanov
- Date of birth: 27 October 1980 (age 46)
- Height: 1.80 m (5 ft 11 in)
- Positions: Midfielder; forward

Senior career*
Years	Team	Apps	(Gls)
2000–2002	FC Dynamo Izhevsk	64	(7)
2003–2009	FC SOYUZ-Gazprom Izhevsk	151	(18)
2010	FC Bashinformsvyaz-Dynamo Ufa	18	(1)
2011–2012	FC Zenit-Izhevsk	22	(0)
- * Club domestic league appearances and goals

Kirill Valeryevich Romanov (Russian: Кирилл Валерьевич Романов; born 27 October 1980) is a former Russian professional football player.

== Club career ==
He made his Russian Football National League debut for FC Gazovik-Gazprom Izhevsk on 10 April 2003, in a game against FC Kristall Smolensk.
