= Grand Duke Nicholas Konstantinovich of Russia =

Russian grand duke (1850–1918)

Grand Duke Nicholas Constantinovich
- Великий Князь Николай Константинович Романов
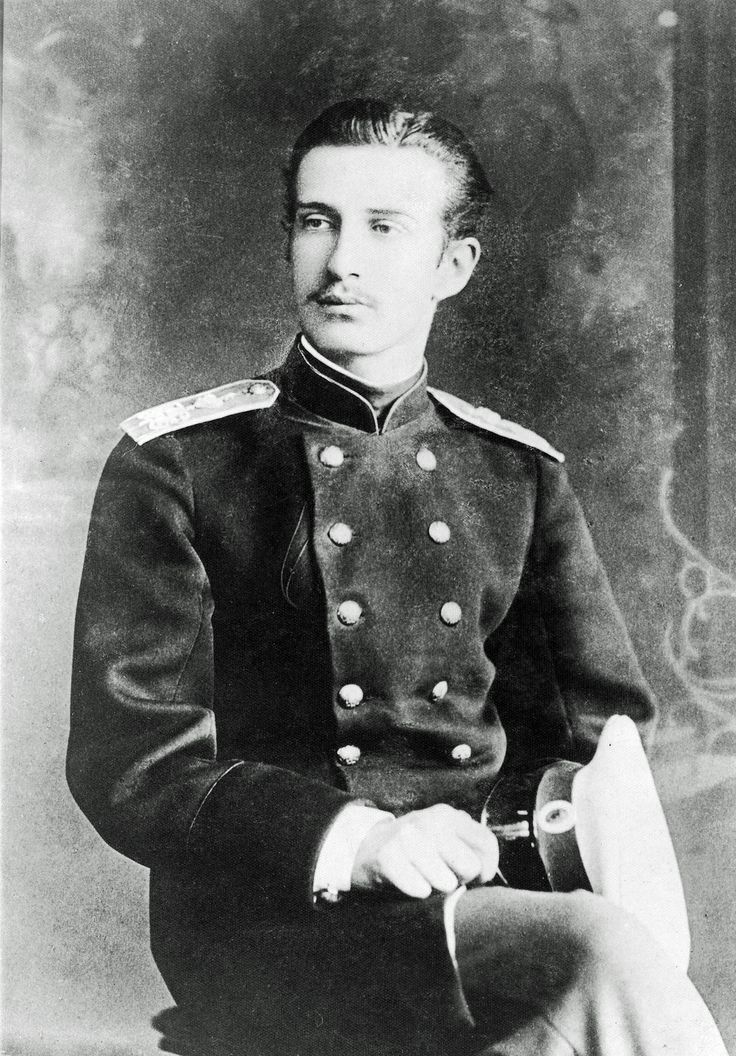
- Born: 14 February 1850; Saint Petersburg, Russian Empire
- Died: 26 January 1918 (aged 67); Tashkent, Russian Soviet Federative Socialist Republic
- Burial: St. George's Cathedral, Tashkent
- Spouse: Nadezhda Alexandrovna Dreyer (m. 1882)
- Issue Detail: Prince Artemy Nikolayevich; Prince Aleksandr Nikolayevich
- House: Holstein-Gottorp-Romanov
- Father: Grand Duke Constantine Nikolaevich of Russia
- Mother: Princess Alexandra of Saxe-Altenburg

Grand Duke Nicholas Konstantinovich of Russia (14 February 1850 – 26 January 1918) was the first-born son of Grand Duke Konstantin Nikolayevich and Grand Duchess Alexandra Iosifovna of Russia and a grandson of Nicholas I of Russia.

== Early life ==
Nicholas was born during the reign of his paternal grandfather Emperor Nicholas I of Russia, and, like the eldest sons of all his four sons, was named after him. At the time of his birth, he was seventh in the order of succession to the Russian throne, behind his uncle, four cousins, and father.

Most royal children were brought up by nannies and servants so by the time Nikolai had grown up he lived a very independent life having become a gifted military officer and an incorrigible womanizer. In 1873, he had an affair with a notorious American woman Henrietta "Harriet" Ely Blackford. In a scandal related to this affair, he stole three valuable diamonds from the revetment of one of the most valuable family icons. The police swiftly tracked down both the diamonds and the perpetrator. When confronted by the officials and the family, he obstinately denied the facts and showed no repentance.

From April 1874, he was placed under home arrest, and the possibility of public denunciation and even a trial was discussed. However, his uncle Emperor Alexander II decided not to present a member of the dynasty as a criminal to the public. Such a disclosure would almost certainly force Grand Duke Konstantin, Nicholas' father, to resign from his public offices, so a less scandalous course of action was followed. On December 11, 1874, the young Grand Duke was formally declared by a decree of the Emperor to be insane and incapacitated, the only Romanov dynast ever to be so, and his property was put under guardianship. By that day, Nicholas had been already de facto banished from Saint Petersburg.

For a short period he was exiled to Orenburg and ultimately further to the newly conquered city of Tashkent in Central Asia where Nicholas lived until his death. He was still styled Grand Duke but stripped of all the royal patronages and duties and discharged from the army, in which grand dukes were normally enlisted.

Blackford, who was forced by the police to leave Russia immediately, later wrote about the affair in her book "Roman d'une Americaine en Russie" under the pseudonym Fanny Lear.

== Later life ==
He lived for many years under constant supervision in the area around Tashkent in the southeastern Russian Empire (now Uzbekistan) and made a great contribution to the city by using his personal fortune to help improve the local area. In 1890 he ordered the building of his own palace in Tashkent to house and show his large and very valuable collection of works of art and the collection is now the center of the state Museum of Arts of Uzbekistan. He was also famous in Tashkent as a competent engineer and irrigator, constructing two large canals, the Bukhar-aryk (which was poorly aligned and soon silted up) and the much more successful Khiva-Aryk, later extended to form the Emperor Nicholas I Canal, irrigating 12,000 desyatinas, 33,000 acres (134 km^{2}) of land in the Hungry Steppe between Djizak and Tashkent. Most of this was then settled with Slavic peasant colonisers.

Nikolai had a number of children by different women. One of his grandchildren, Natalia Androsova, died in Moscow in 1999.

== Death ==
Nikolai's health was deteriorating since 1916. By then, he was the oldest living Grand Duke. He lived to see the fall of the Russian Empire in 1917, at which time he was eighth in the line of succession, never formally removed despite his alleged mental incapacity. The February Revolution of 1917 set him free, and the former Grand Duke visited Saint Petersburg for the first time in 43 years, but soon returned to Tashkent, suffering with asthma. He made his last will and testament in December 1917 and died of pneumonia on 26 January 1918. He was buried, according to a permission given the Soviet comissars of Tashkent to his widow, in front of St. George's Cathedral (later demolished by the Soviet regime).

== Family ==
Nikolai married Nadezhda (variantly spelled Nadejda) Alexandrovna Dreyer (1861–1929), daughter of Orenburg police chief Alexander Gustavovich Dreyer and Sophia Ivanovna Opanovskaya, in 1882. Two children were born from this marriage:

- Artemy Nikolayevich Prince Iskander (or Prince Romanovsky-Iskander) (1881–1919), killed in the Russian Civil War
- Alexander Nikolayevich Prince Iskander (15 November 1887 N.S. – 26 January 1957), married Olga Iosifovna Rogovskaya / Rogowska (1893–1962) on 5 May 1912. The couple had two children. Alexander and Olga were later divorced, and Alexander married Natalya Khanykova (30 December 1893 – 20 April 1982) in 1930. No children resulted from the latter marriage.
  - Prince Kirill Romanovsky-Iskander, adopted name (via stepfather, Nicholas Androsov) Kirill Nikolaevich Androsov (5 December 1914 – 1992)
  - Natalya Alexandrovna Princess Romanovskaya-Iskander, adopted name Natalya Nikolaevna Androsova (2 February 1917 – 1999)

== Honours ==
- Russian Empire:
  - Knight of St. Andrew, 14 February 1850
  - Knight of St. Alexander Nevsky, 14 February 1850
  - Knight of St. Anna, 1st Class, 14 February 1850
- (Saxe-Coburg and Gotha) (Duchy of Saxe-Altenburg) (Saxe-Meiningen) Ernestine duchies: Grand Cross of the Saxe-Ernestine House Order, November 1858
- Oldenburg: Grand Cross of the Order of Duke Peter Friedrich Ludwig, with Golden Crown, 15 March 1863
- Grand Duchy of Hesse: Grand Cross of the Ludwig Order, 10 May 1865
- Kingdom of Prussia:
  - Knight of the Black Eagle, 4 October 1864
  - Grand Cross of the Red Eagle, 4 October 1864; Knight 3rd Class with Swords on Black Band with White Edge, 1874
  - Grand Commander's Cross of the Royal House Order of Hohenzollern, 7 May 1873
- Saxe-Weimar-Eisenach: Grand Cross of the White Falcon, 1868
- Württemberg: Knight of the Military Merit Order, 5 March 1874
- (Austrian Empire) (Kingdom of Hungary) Austria-Hungary: Grand Cross of the Royal Hungarian Order of St. Stephen, 1874
- Principality of Montenegro: Grand Cross of the Order of Prince Danilo I

== Ancestry ==
Ancestors of Grand Duke Nicholas Konstantinovich of Russia

8. Paul I of Russia
4. Nicholas I of Russia
9. Sophie Dorothea of Württemberg
2. Grand Duke Konstantin Nikolayevich of Russia
10. Frederick William III of Prussia
5. Charlotte of Prussia
11. Louise of Mecklenburg-Strelitz
1. Grand Duke Nicholas Konstantinovich of Russia
12. Frederick, Duke of Saxe-Altenburg
6. Joseph, Duke of Saxe-Altenburg
13. Duchess Charlotte Georgine of Mecklenburg-Strelitz
3. Princess Alexandra of Saxe-Altenburg
14. Duke Louis of Württemberg
7. Duchess Amelia of Württemberg
15. Princess Henriette of Nassau-Weilburg
