= Princess Alexandra of Saxe-Altenburg =

Grand Duchess of Russia (1830–1911)

Princess Alexandra
- Grand Duchess Alexandra Iosifovna of Russia
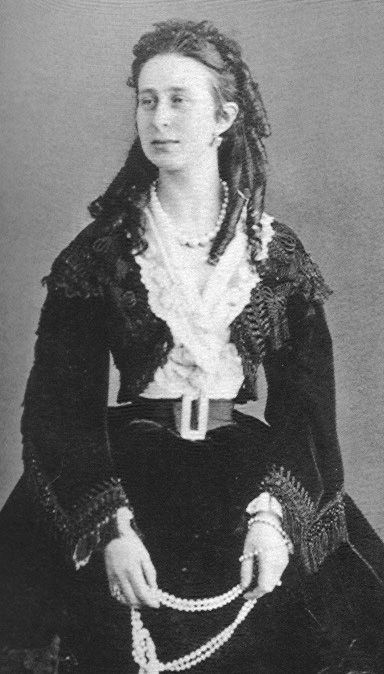
- Photograph c. 1865
- Born: Princess Alexandra of Saxe-Altenburg; 8 July 1830; Altenburg, Duchy of Saxe-Altenburg
- Died: 6 July 1911 (aged 80); Saint Petersburg, Russian Empire
- Burial: Grand Ducal Burial Vault, St. Petersburg, Russian Empire
- Spouse: Grand Duke Konstantin Nikolayevich of Russia (m. 1848; died 1892)
- Issue: Grand Duke Nicholas Constantinovich; Olga, Queen of the Hellenes; Vera, Duchess Eugen of Württemberg; Grand Duke Constantine Constantinovich; Grand Duke Dimitri Constantinovich; Grand Duke Vyacheslav Constantinovich
Names
- Alexandra Friederike Henriette Pauline Marianne Elisabeth
- House: Saxe-Altenburg
- Father: Joseph, Duke of Saxe-Altenburg
- Mother: Duchess Amelia of Württemberg

Grand Duchess Alexandra Iosifovna of Russia (Russian: Александра Иосифовна, romanized: Aleksandra Iosifovna; born Princess Alexandra of Saxe-Altenburg; 8 July 1830 – 6 July 1911) was the fifth daughter of Joseph, Duke of Saxe-Altenburg and Duchess Amelia of Württemberg.

== Early life ==
Born in Altenburg on 8 July 1830, Alexandra's parents were married on 24 April 1817, at Kirchheim unter Teck. Alexandra had five sisters: Marie, Pauline, Therese, Elisabeth, and Luise. Alexandra's portrait was painted by the fashionable court artist Joseph Karl Stieler. She was called "Sanny" by her friends and family.

== Marriage and issue ==
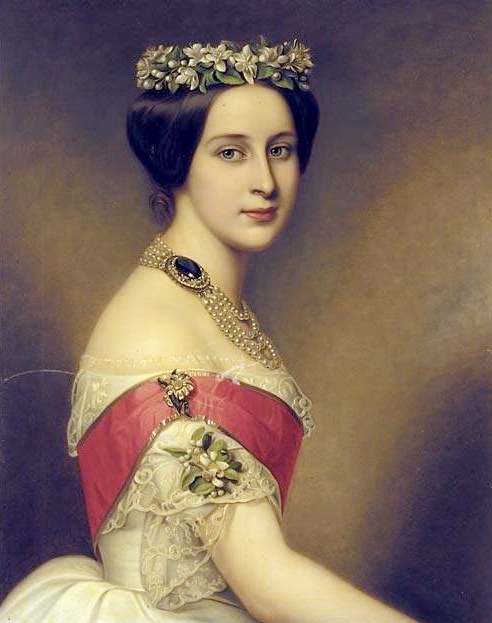
Portrait by Joseph Karl Stieler, c. 1850

In the summer of 1846, she met her second cousin, Grand Duke Konstantin Nikolayevich of Russia when he visited Altenburg. He was the second son of Nicholas I, Emperor of Russia, and Empress Alexandra Feodorovna, née Princess Charlotte of Prussia. Konstantin stayed for a few days at Alexandra's father's castle. His visit there had been arranged by Alexandra's aunt, Grand Duchess Elena Pavlovna, who had been born Princess Charlotte of Württemberg. Elena and Alexandra's mother were both descended from Frederick II Eugene, Duke of Württemberg. Elena was married to Grand Duke Michael Pavlovich, the younger brother of Tsar Nicholas I. Elena Pavlovna was therefore Konstantin's aunt by marriage and Alexandra's aunt by birth. Elena was a strong influence over Konstantin, who admired her intellect and progressive views. She had literary interests and was musical, founding the St Petersburg Conservatoire, and the young Konstantin often spent time at Elena's home and salon in St Petersburg.

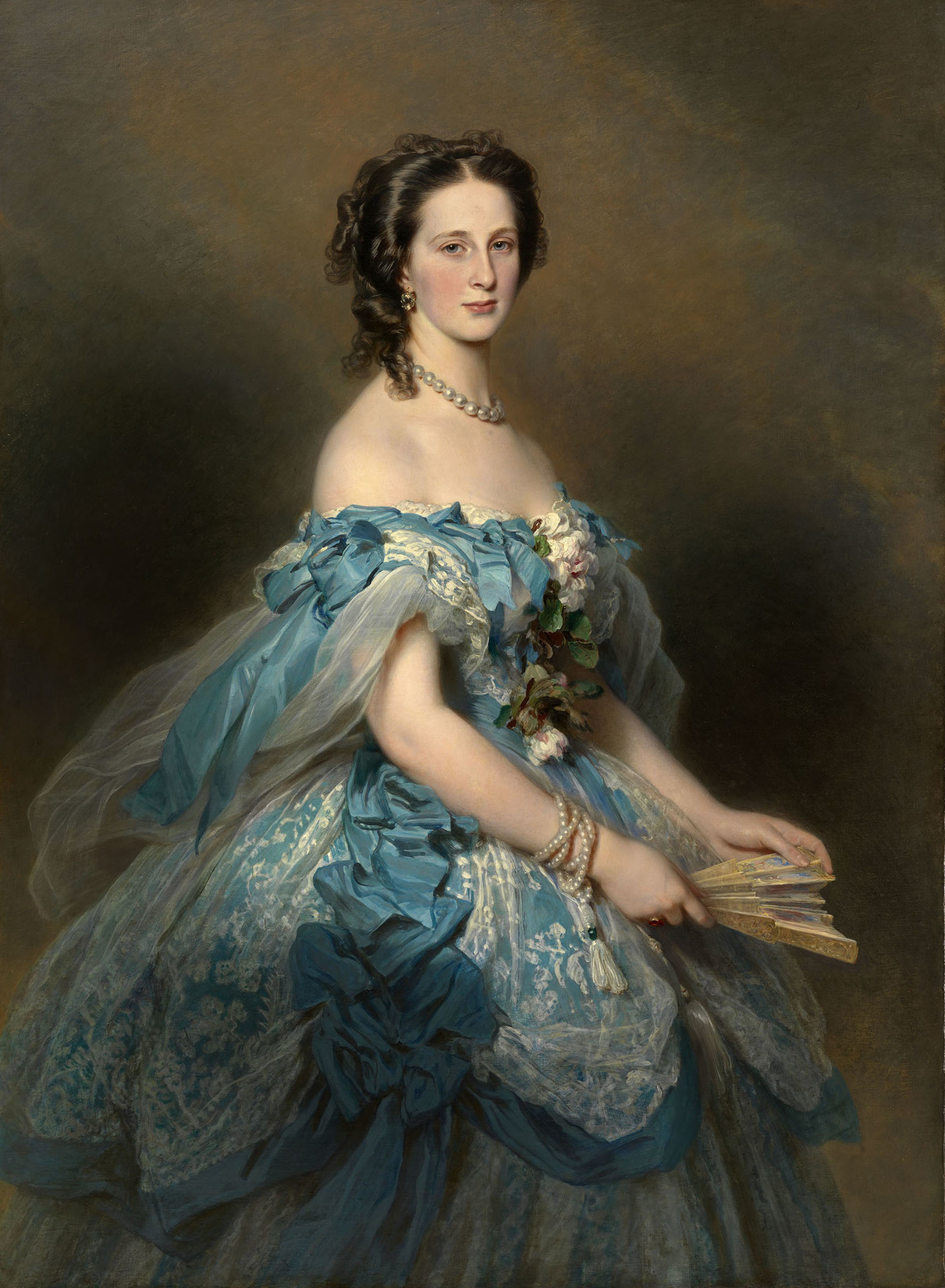
Grand Duchess Alexandra Iosifovna of Russia by Franz Xaver Winterhalter.

Konstantin was intellectual and liberal, whereas Alexandra was conservative and rather high spirited. Although their temperaments differed, they both shared an interest in music, and enjoyed playing duets at the piano. Konstantin was captivated by Alexandra's youthful beauty: she being tall, slender and attractive. He quickly became besotted, and was eager to marry her "I don't know what is happening to me. It is as if I am a completely new person. Just one thought moves me, just one image fills my eyes: forever and only she, my angel, my universe. I really do think I’m in love. However, what can it mean? I've only known her just a few hours and I'm already up to my ears in Passion". She was only 16 and Konstantin 19; they were engaged but had to wait two more years before they could finally marry.

Alexandra arrived in Russia on 12 October 1847, and was greeted by much fanfare and popular celebration, with jubilant crowds lining the streets and balconies. It was said that Alexandra looked so much like her fiancé's sister, the Grand Duchess Alexandra Nikolayevna, who died in childbirth, that her prospective mother-in-law burst into tears at their first meeting.

In February 1848, Alexandra converted to Russian Orthodoxy, taking the name of Grand Duchess Alexandra Iosifovna, which reflected her father's name Joseph (unlike many princesses she took a patronymic, choosing to reflect her parentage rather than the usual religious or dynastic associations which was also possible because Iosif was a common name in Russia).

Alexandra and Konstantin were married in the Winter Palace in St Petersburg, on 11 September 1848. Konstantin received the Marble Palace in St Petersburg as a wedding gift from his parents. Strelna on the Gulf of Finland, which Konstantin inherited when aged four, was the wedded couple's country retreat. The lively Grand Duchess Alexandra Iosifovna took a particular interest in the grounds at Strelna, establishing a free school of gardening, where she taught classes herself. There were also educational toys for the children: a wooden mast and trampoline for gymnastics, and the transplanted cabin of one of Konstantin's frigates.

A year after their marriage, Konstantin inherited the Pavlovsk Palace, situated 19 miles to the south of St Petersburg, from his uncle Grand Duke Michael Pavlovich. The public was admitted to the fine park in its grounds. The Grand-Ducal family supported an impressive concert hall situated at Pavlovsk station, which proved popular with the middle classes, and attracted names such as Johann Strauss II, Franz Liszt, and Hector Berlioz.

Alexandra and Konstantin later acquired the palace of Oreanda in Crimea, which had originally been built by Tsarina Alexandra Feodorovna and left to her second son for his retirement.

Konstantin and Alexandra had 6 children:

1. Nikolai Konstantinovich (14 February 1850 – 26 January 1918); married 1882, Nadejda Alexandrovna von Dreyer.
2. Olga Konstantinovna, Queen of the Hellenes (3 September [O.S. 22 August] 1851 1851 – 18 June 1926); married 1867, George I of Greece and is an ancestor of both Felipe VI of Spain and Charles III of the United Kingdom
3. Vera Konstantinovna (16 February 1854 – 11 April 1912); married 1874, Duke Eugen of Württemberg.
4. Konstantin Konstantinovich (22 August 1858 – 15 June 1915); married 1884, Princess Elisabeth of Saxe-Altenburg.
5. Dmitry Konstantinovich (13 June 1860 – 28 January 1919); died unmarried.
6. Vyacheslav Konstantinovich (13 July 1862 – 27 February 1879); died unmarried.

Their daughter, Vera, suffered from a "nervous condition" which resulted in Alexandra and Konstantin sending her to her aunt, Grand Duchess Olga in Württemberg in December 1863.

== Family crisis ==
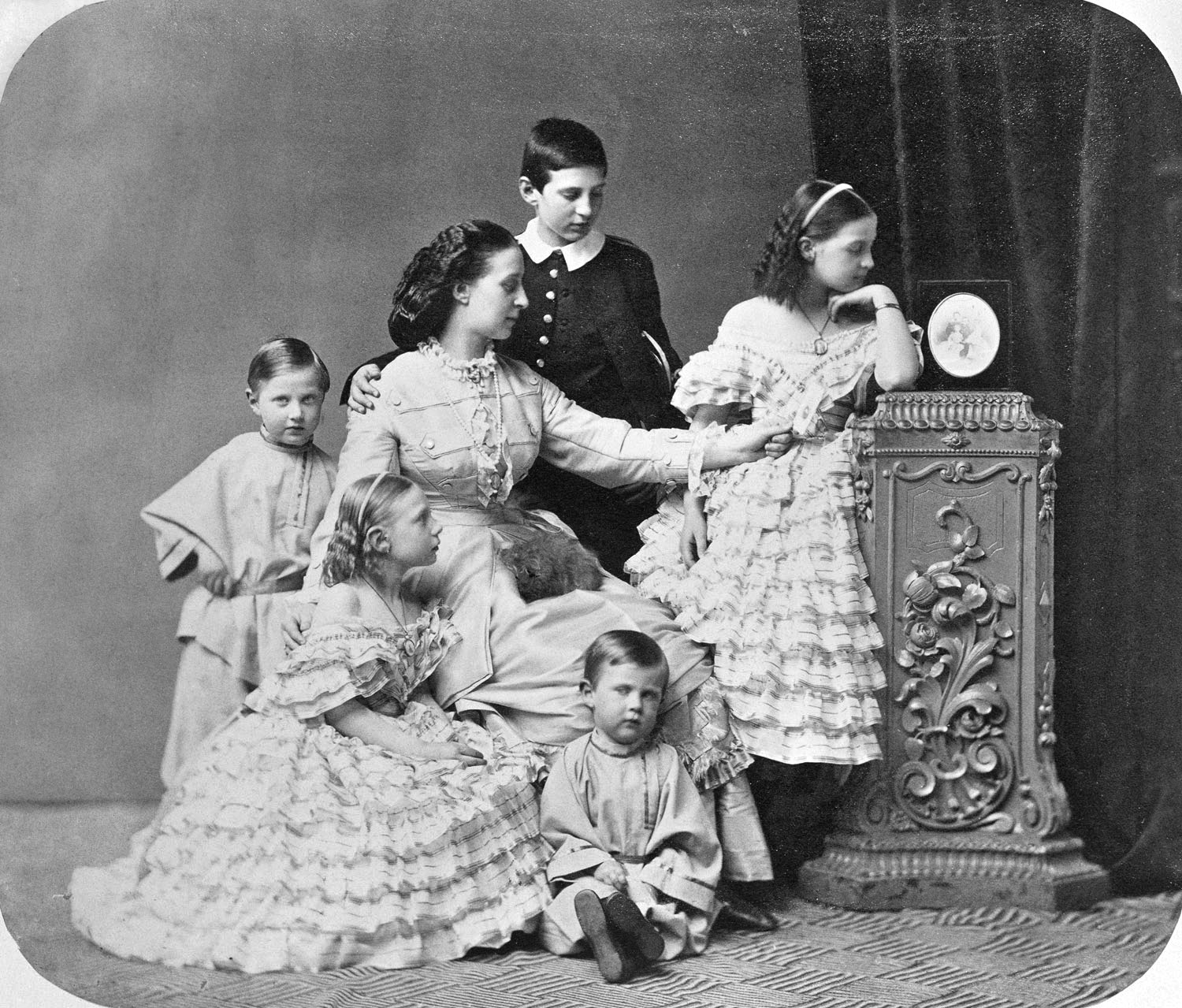
(Clockwise) Grand Duchess Alexandra Iosifovna with her five eldest children: Nicholas, Olga, Dimitri, Vera and Constantine Constantinovich

In 1867, Alexandra's eldest daughter, Olga, married King George I of Greece. She was only 16, and Konstantin was initially reluctant for her to marry so young. In July 1868, Olga's first child was born and was named Konstantin after his grandfather. The beginning of their daughter's family coincided with the start of the breakdown of Alexandra and Konstantin's marriage.

Although he was only 40, Konstantin's struggles and travails of the previous decade— naval and judiciary reforms, the freeing of the serfs—had prematurely aged him. As his brother Tsar Alexander II turned away from the reform that had marked his first decade on the throne, Konstantin's influence began to wane and he began to focus more on his personal life. After twenty years of marriage, he had drifted away from his wife. Konstantin's heavy workload, and the couple's divergent political views and interests had over the years slowly torn away at their relationship. Alexandra was as conservative as her husband was liberal, and she had learnt to concern herself with her own society and mysticism. Soon, Konstantin turned elsewhere for sexual intimacy.

At the end of the 1860s, Konstantin embarked on an affair and conceived an illegitimate daughter, Marie Condousso. In the 1880s, Marie was sent to Greece, later serving as lady in waiting to her half-sister, Queen Olga. Marie eventually married a Greek banker.

Soon after the birth of Marie, Konstantin began a new liaison. Around 1868, Konstantin began to pursue Anna Vasilyevna Kuznetsova, a young dancer from the St Petersburg Conservatoire. She was the illegitimate daughter of ballerina Tatyana Markyanovna Kuznetsova and actor Vasily Andreyevich Karatygin. Anna was 20 years younger than Konstantin and, in 1873, she gave birth to their first child. Four more would follow.

Konstantin bought his mistress a large, comfortable dacha on his estate at Pavlovsk; thereby lodging his second family in close proximity to Alexandra, whom he now referred to as his "government–issue wife". By this act Konstantin gave ammunition to his political enemies, with Russian society reacting to the scandal by siding with his suffering wife, Alexandra, who tried to bear his infidelity with dignity.

In 1874, fresh scandal erupted when it was discovered that Alexandra and Konstantin's eldest son, Grand Duke Nikolay Konstantinovich, who had lived a dissipated life and had revolutionary ideas, had stolen three valuable diamonds from an icon in Alexandra's private bedroom, aided by his mistress, an American courtesan. Alexandra's 24-year-old son was found guilty, declared insane, and banished for life to Central Asia. Alexandra suffered another bitter blow when in 1879, her youngest son, Vyacheslav, died unexpectedly from a brain haemorrhage.

== Husband's illness and death ==
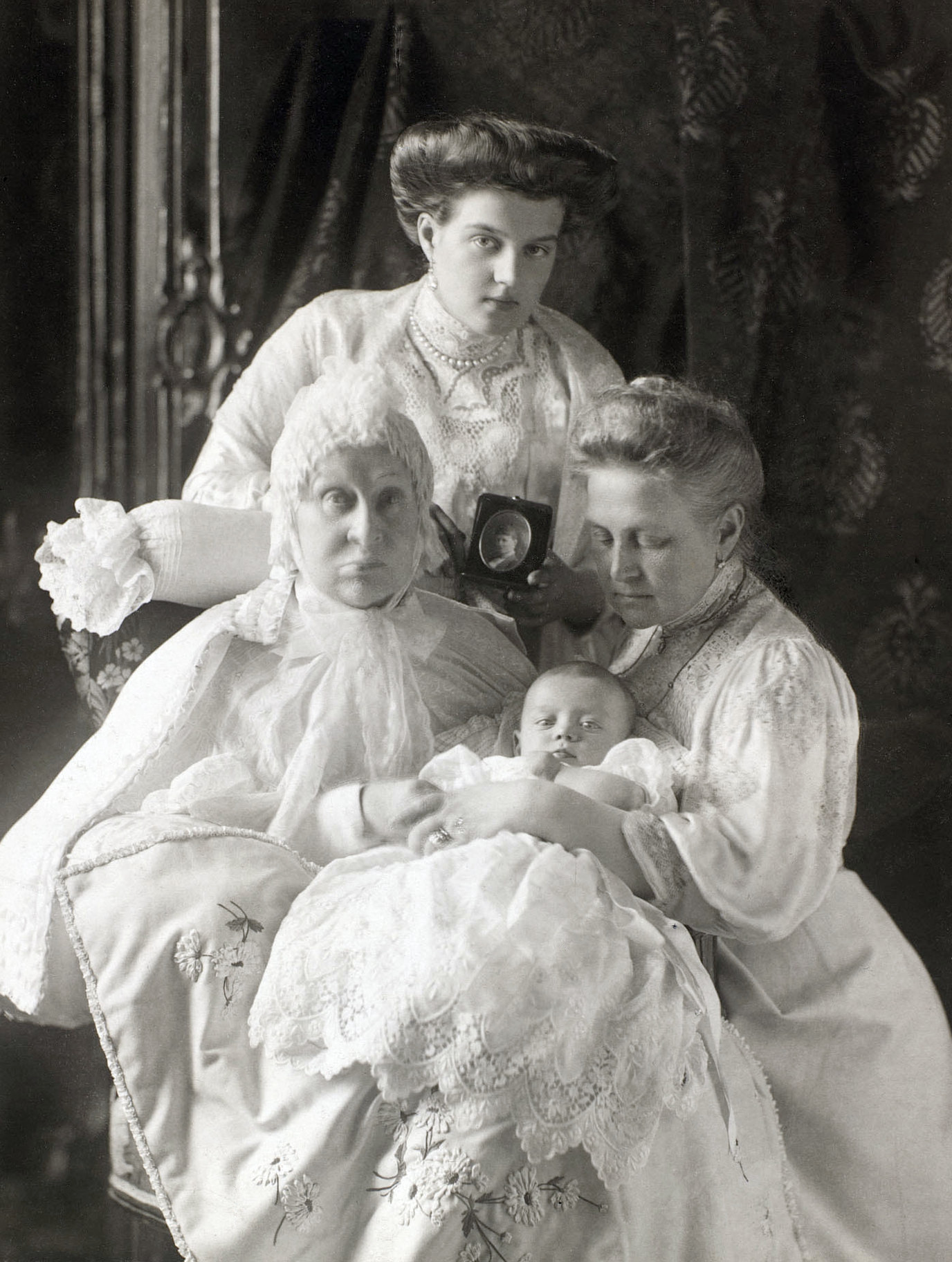
Grand Duchess Alexandra Iosifovna with her daughter, Queen Olga of Greece, her female-line great-granddaughter, Princess Maria of Sweden and female-line great-great-grandson, Lennart. Behind Grand Duchess Alexandra there is a portrait of Olga's late daughter and Maria's mother, Alexandra.

In June 1889, Alexandra's 18-year-old granddaughter, Princess Alexandra of Greece, returned to Russia to marry Grand Duke Paul, who was the younger brother of Tsar Alexander III. Towards the end of the wedding celebrations, Konstantin suffered a stroke. This was followed in August 1889 by a severe cause, which left him unable to walk or speak.

For the remaining three years of his life, Konstantin lived with his wife in her favourite palace Pavlovsk, having a wing of the building to himself. He was confined to a bath chair, and Alexandra saw to it that Konstantin was denied contact with his mistress and illegitimate offspring. Alexandra's grandson, Christopher of Greece, wrote in his memoirs that Konstantin became so frustrated with being under Alexandra's control that he one day grabbed her by the hair and beat her with his stick. Seeing as Christopher would have only been 4 years old at the time of Konstantin's death, it is difficult to know the full truth of this story.

Despite his illness, Konstantin tried to amuse himself as best he could. His grandnephew Cyril Vladimirovich remembered skating parties at Pavlovsk, where Konstantin would watch from his sledge, and how he always "smelt of cigars". Cyril found Alexandra a formidable woman, with her "high pitched voice....driving about in an open carriage with a kind of awning over it, which could be opened and closed like an umbrella. I have never seen anything quite the same anywhere else, and think that she was the only person in the world who had such an ingenious cover to her carriage".

When Konstantin died in January 1892, Alexandra arranged for his mistress Anna to visit Pavlovsk and pray at Konstantin's bedside.

Alexandra died on 6 July 1911, two days before her eighty-first birthday. She was the oldest member of the imperial family at the time of her death. She was in ill health for some time, suffering with chronic inflammation of the kidneys and larynx.

== Archives ==
Alexandra's letters to her daughter, Queen Olga of Greece, between 1867 and 1877 are preserved in the "Aleksandra Iosifovna letters to Queen Olga of Greece" collection in the Hoover Institution Archives (Stanford, California, USA).

Alexandra's letters to Princess Florestine of Monaco, written between 1873 and 1879, are preserved in the State Archive of Stuttgart (Hauptstaatsarchiv Stuttgart) in Stuttgart, Germany.

== Ancestry ==
Ancestors of Princess Alexandra of Saxe-Altenburg

8. Ernest Frederick III, Duke of Saxe-Hildburghausen
4. Frederick, Duke of Saxe-Altenburg
9. Princess Ernestine of Saxe-Weimar
2. Joseph, Duke of Saxe-Altenburg
10. Charles II, Grand Duke of Mecklenburg-Strelitz
5. Duchess Charlotte Georgine of Mecklenburg-Strelitz
11. Princess Friederike of Hesse-Darmstadt
1. Princess Alexandra of Saxe-Altenburg
12. Frederick II Eugene, Duke of Württemberg
6. Duke Louis of Württemberg
13. Princess Friederike of Brandenburg-Schwedt
3. Duchess Amelia of Württemberg
14. Charles Christian, Prince of Nassau-Weilburg
7. Princess Henriette of Nassau-Weilburg
15. Princess Carolina of Orange-Nassau

== Bibliography ==
- Zeepvat, Charlotte. Romanov Autumn. Sutton Publishing, 2000. ISBN 0-7509-2739-9
- Kirill Vladimirovich, Grand Duke. My Life in Russia’s Service. London: Selwyn and Blount, 1939.
