= Grand Duke Konstantin Konstantinovich of Russia =

Russian royal and writer (1858–1915)

Grand Duke Konstantin Konstantinovich
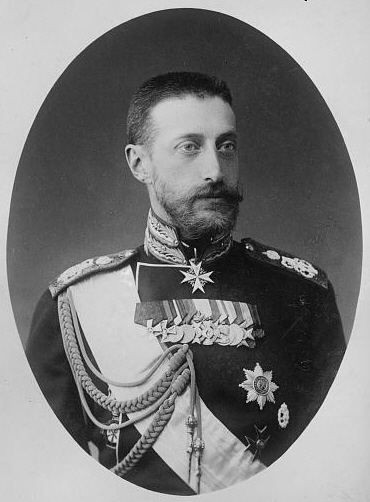
- Photograph, c. 1891
- Born: 22 August 1858; Constantine Palace, Strelna, Saint Petersburg, Russian Empire
- Died: 15 June 1915 (aged 56); Pavlovsk Palace, Pavlovsk, Russian Empire
- Burial: Grand Ducal Burial Vault, St. Petersburg, Russian Empire
- Spouse: Princess Elisabeth of Saxe-Altenburg (m. 1884)
- Issue: Prince John Konstantinovich; Prince Gabriel Konstantinovich; Princess Tatiana Konstantinovna; Prince Constantine Konstantinovich; Prince Oleg Konstantinovich; Prince Igor Konstantinovich; Prince George Konstantinovich; Princess Natalia Konstantinovna; Princess Vera Konstantinovna
- House: Holstein-Gottorp-Romanov
- Father: Grand Duke Constantine Nikolaevich of Russia
- Mother: Princess Alexandra of Saxe-Altenburg

Grand Duke Konstantin Konstantinovich of Russia (Russian: Константи́н Константи́нович, IPA: [kənstɐnʲˈtʲin kənstɐnʲˈtʲinəvʲɪtɕ]; 22 August 1858 – 15 June 1915) was a grandson of Emperor Nicholas I of Russia, and a poet and playwright of some renown. He wrote under the pen name "K.R.", initials of his given name and family name, Konstantin Romanov.

== Early life ==
The fourth child of the Grand Duke Konstantin Nikolayevich of Russia and his spouse Princess Alexandra of Saxe-Altenburg, Grand Duke Konstantin was born on 22 August [O.S. 10 August] 1858 at the Constantine Palace, in Strelna in the Tsarskoselsky Uyezd of Saint Petersburg Governorate (now part of Saint Petersburg). His eldest sister Grand Duchess Olga married King George I of the Hellenes in 1867.

From his early childhood Konstantin Konstantinovich was more interested in letters, art, and music than in the military upbringing required for Romanov boys. Nevertheless, the Grand Duke was sent to serve in the Imperial Russian Navy. Konstantin Konstantinovich was unsatisfied, and left the navy to join the elite Izmailovsky Regiment of the Imperial Guard, where he served with distinction.

== Public life ==
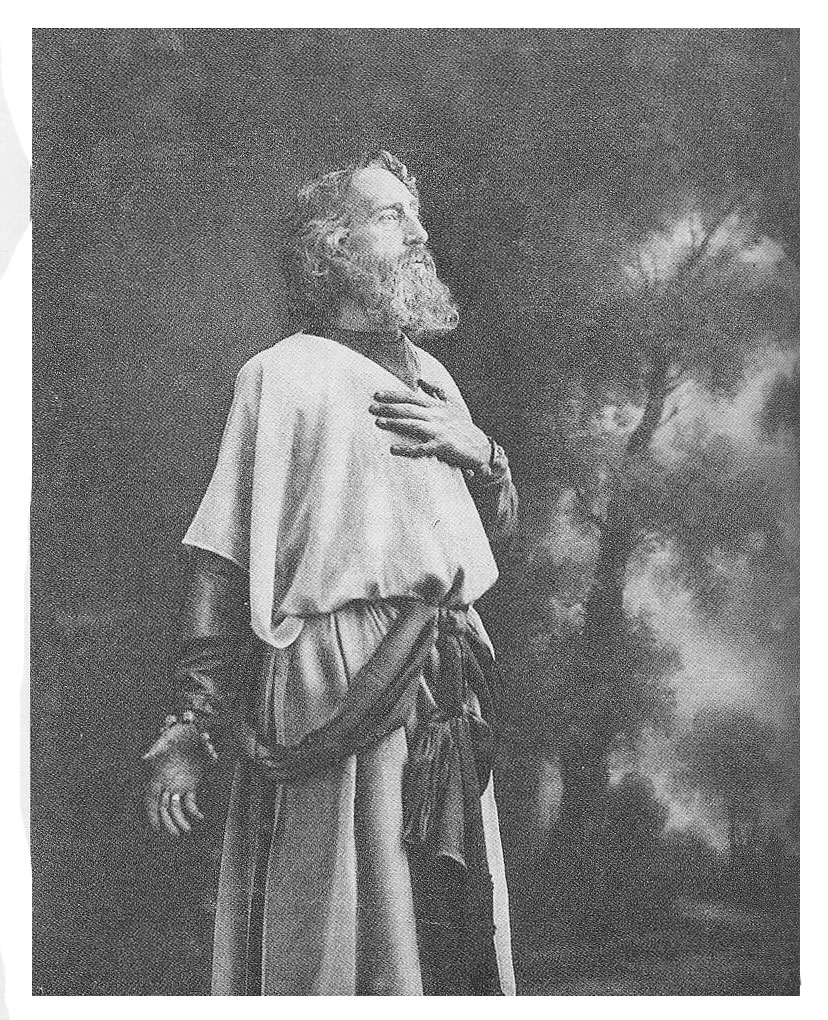
Konstantin Konstantinovich as Joseph of Arimathea in his own play Tsar of Judea, 1914

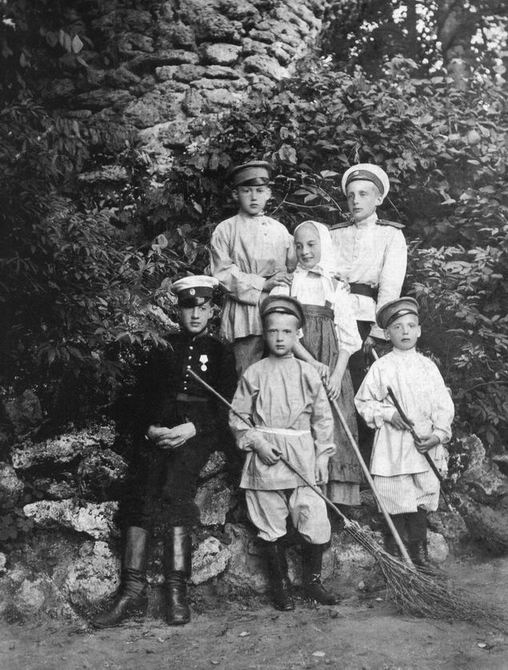
Six children of Grand Duke Konstantin Konstantinovich

Konstantin Konstantinovich was both a patron of Russian art and an artist in his own right. A talented pianist, the Grand Duke was Chairman of the Russian Musical Society, and counted Tchaikovsky among his closest friends. But Konstantin Konstantinovich was first and foremost a man of letters. He founded several Russian literary societies. He translated foreign works (including Schiller and Goethe) into Russian, and was particularly proud of his Russian translation of Hamlet, which received its premiere on 26 February 1900 in the theatre of the Hermitage Palace. An accomplished poet and playwright, Konstantin Konstantinovich also took great interest in the direction of his plays. The Grand Duke actually appeared in his last play, "King of Judea," playing the role of Joseph of Arimathea. He wrote under the pen name "K.R.", initials of his given name and family name, Konstantin Romanov.

The Grand Duke's artistic slavophilism and devotion to duty endeared him to both Alexander III and Nicholas II. The former appointed Konstantin Konstantinovich as President of the Russian Academy of Sciences, and later as Chief of All Military Colleges. He was also made an honorary member of the Royal Swedish Academy of Sciences in 1902, with reference to his chairmanship of a Swedish-Russian surveying commission.

Konstantin Konstantinovich and his spouse were among the relatively few Romanovs on intimate terms with Nicholas II and the Empress Alexandra, who found Konstantin Konstantinovich's devotion to his family a welcome respite from the playboy lifestyle of many of the other Grand Dukes.

He was also a close friend of the Grand Duchess Elizabeth Fyodorovna and wrote a poem about her expressing his admiration when she first came to Russia to be married. He was also one of the few members of the Imperial Family to go to Moscow to attend the funeral of Elizabeth's husband, Grand Duke Sergei Alexandrovich, who was killed by a terrorist's bomb.

== Marriage and family ==
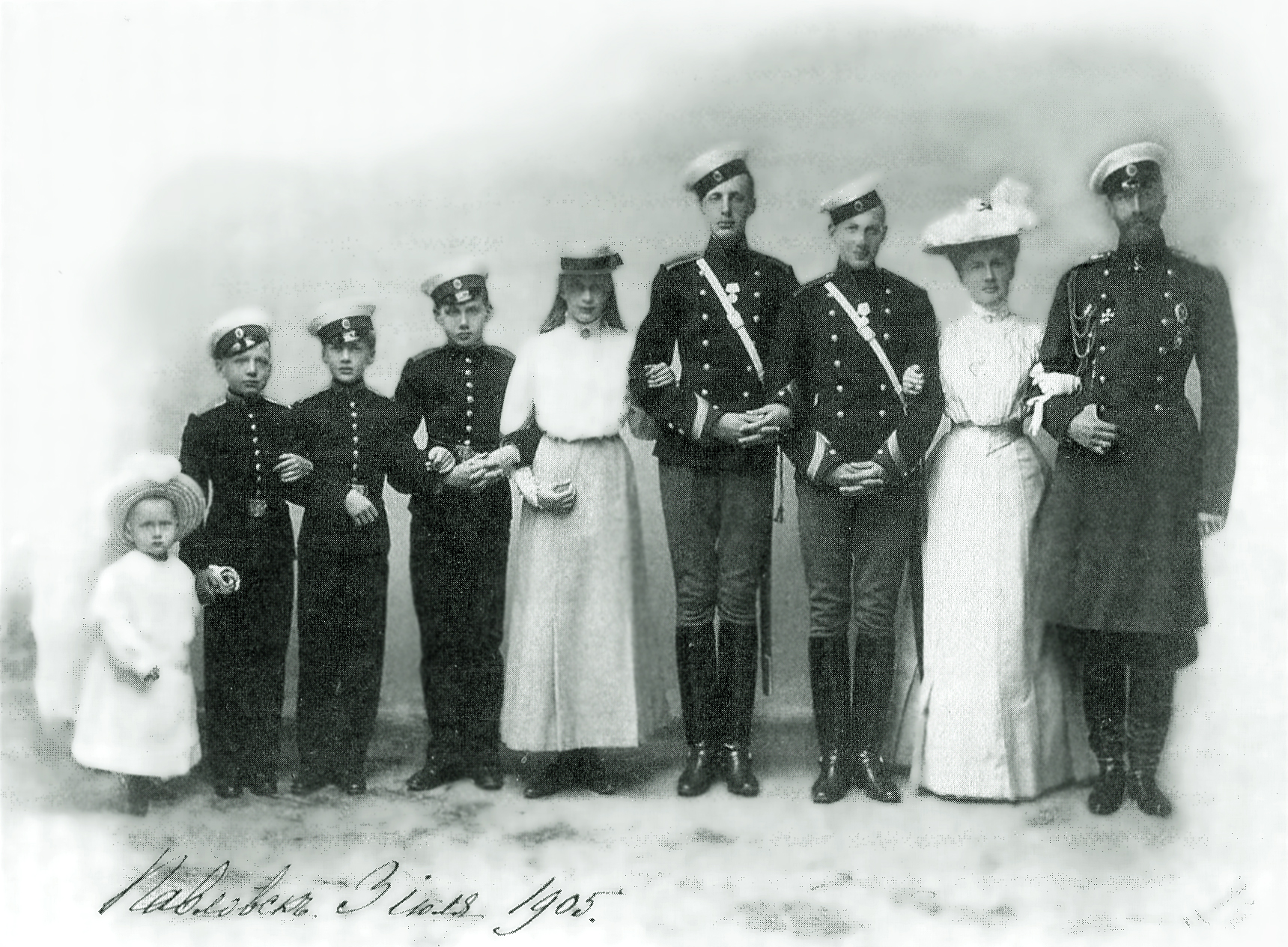
Grand Duke Konstantin Konstantinovich, his spouse Grand Duchess Elizabeth and their children.

Konstantin Konstantinovich married in 1884 in St Petersburg Princess Elisabeth of Saxe-Altenburg, his second cousin. Upon her marriage, Elisabeth became the Grand Duchess Elizaveta Mavrikievna. She was known within the family as "Mavra." Konstantin Konstantinovich was, by all accounts, devoted to his wife and children, and a loving father. He and his family made their home at Pavlovsk Palace, a suburban palace of St. Petersburg, and a favorite residence of Konstantin Konstantinovich's great-grandfather, the Emperor Paul I.

The couple would have a total of nine children:

- Prince John (1886–1918), born a Grand Duke, he was, at nine days old, stripped of the title by an Imperial ukaz and styled a Prince of the Blood Imperial
- Prince Gabriel (1887–1955)
- Princess Tatiana (1890–1979)
- Prince Konstantin (1891–1918)
- Prince Oleg (1892–1914)
- Prince Igor (1894–1918)
- Prince Georgy (1903–1938)
- Princess Natalia (died at exactly two months, 1905)
- Princess Vera (1906–2001)

Prince John married Princess Helen of Serbia (daughter of King Peter of Serbia) in 1911. Princess Tatiana married Prince Konstantin Bagration-Muhransky, a Georgian prince, that same year.

Konstantin Konstantinovich's children were the first to fall under the new Family Law promulgated by Emperor Alexander III. It stated that henceforth, only the children and male-line grandchildren of a Tsar would be styled Grand Duke or Grand Duchess with the style of Imperial Highness -- great-grandchildren and their descendants would be styled either "Prince of Russia" or "Princess of Russia" with the style of Highness. The revised Family Law was intended to cut down on the number of persons entitled to salaries from the Imperial treasury.

== Sexuality ==
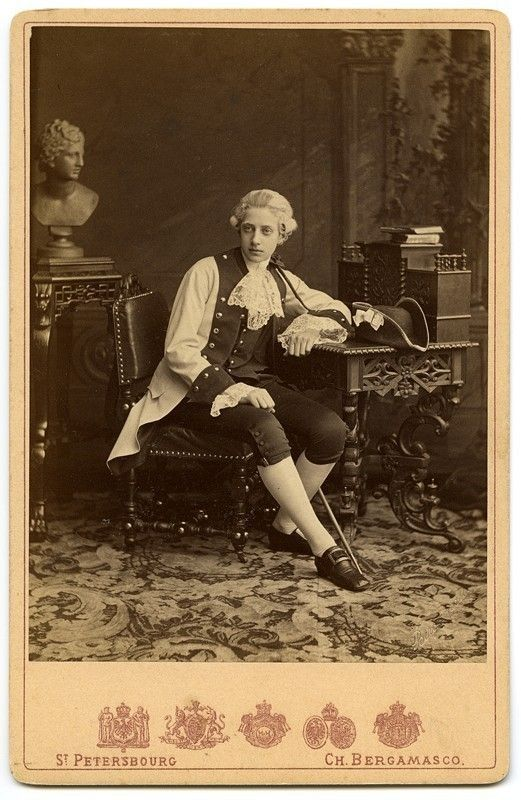
Grand Duke Konstantin as Mozart (1880)

As mentioned, Konstantin Konstantinovich's first homosexual experiences occurred in the Imperial Guards. The Grand Duke made great efforts to repress his feelings. But despite his love for his wife, Konstantin Konstantinovich could not resist the temptations offered to a person of his exalted state. Konstantin Konstantinovich claimed in his diary that between 1893 and 1899 he remained away from the practice of what he called his "main sin." Yet by the birth of his seventh child, Konstantin Konstantinovich had become a steady visitor to several of the male brothels of St. Petersburg. In 1904 he wrote in his diary that he "ordered my coachman...to go, and continued on foot past the bath-house. I intended to walk straight on... But without reaching the Pevchesky Bridge, I turned back and went in. And so I have surrendered again, without much struggle, to my depraved inclinations." The cycle of resistance and capitulation to temptation is a common theme of Konstantin Konstantinovich's diaries.

By the end of 1904, Konstantin Konstantinovich became somewhat attached to an attractive young man by the name of Yatsko. "I sent for Yatsko and he came this morning. I easily persuaded him to be candid. It was strange for me to hear him describe the familiar characteristics: he has never felt drawn to a woman, and has been infatuated with men several times. I did not confess to him that I knew these feelings from my own personal experience. Yatsko and I talked for a long time. Before leaving he kissed my face and hands; I should not have allowed this, and should have pushed him away, however I was punished afterwards by vague feelings of shame and remorse. He told me that, ever since the first time we met, his soul has been filled with rapturous feelings towards me, which grow all the time. How this reminds me of my own youth." A few days later, Konstantin Konstantinovich and Yatsko met again, and a relationship developed between the two.

== War years and death ==
Nadezhda Plevitskaya – "Unhappy died at the military hospital". Words – K.R. (Grand Duke Konstantin Konstantinovich of Russia). Music – Jacob Prigogine (1909).

The outbreak of World War I found Konstantin Konstantinovich and his spouse in Germany, where they were taking the cure in Wildungen. Caught in enemy territory, the couple attempted a quick return to Russia. Their plans were disrupted by German authorities, who claimed the Grand Duke and his wife were political prisoners. Grand Duchess Elizaveta sent a message to the German Imperial couple asking for their help. Eventually Konstantin Konstantinovich and his entourage were allowed to depart Germany and transported to the first Russian station. The weakened Konstantin Konstantinovich had to proceed by foot across the front lines. By the time Konstantin Romanov and his wife Elizaveta Mavrikievna arrived in St. Petersburg, now renamed Petrograd, the Grand Duke was in a dismal state of health.

The first year of the war took a cruel toll on his immediate family. Five of his six sons served in the Russian Army, and in October 1914, his fourth and most talented son, Prince Oleg, was mortally wounded fighting against the Germans. The following March, his son-in-law Prince Bagration-Muhransky was killed on the Caucasus front. Konstantin Konstantinovich's health and spirit were broken by these blows, and he died on 15 June [O.S. 2 June] 1915.

== Fate of Konstantin Konstantinovich's family after the Russian Revolution ==
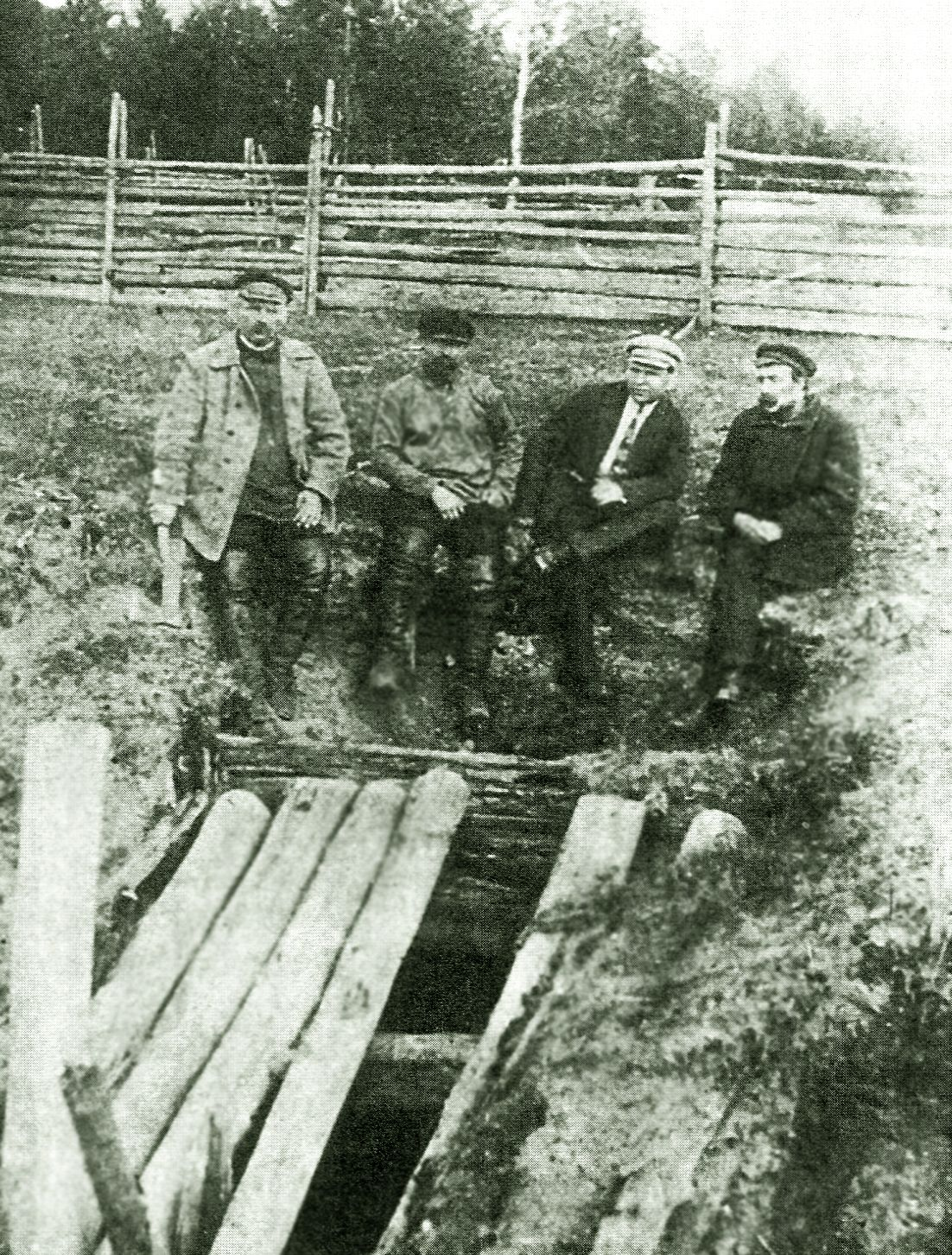
Mine shaft in Alapayevsk where remains of three of Konstantin Konstantinovich's sons were found

The Princes Ioann, Gavriil, Konstantin, and Igor were all arrested after the Bolshevik seizure of power in October 1917. Prince Gavriil was kept in Petrograd due to illness, but the other three princes were deported to Alapayevsk, a small town in the Urals. There they were imprisoned for some months, together with Grand Duchess Elizaveta Feodorovna, her companion, nun Barvara Yakovleva, Grand Duke Sergei Mikhailovich, his secretary Fyodor Remez and Prince Vladimir Paley. On the night of 17–18 July 1918 (24 hours after the execution of Nicholas II and his immediate family in Ekaterinburg), the Alapayevsk prisoners were executed by their Bolshevik captors. Their bodies were recovered from an abandoned mine shaft by the White Army, and reburied in 1920 at the Church of the Martyrs near Beijing, China.

Prince Gavriil was released from prison through the intercession of Maxim Gorki, who had unsuccessfully tried to save several other Romanovs. Gavriil and his wife, whom he had married after the Revolution, emigrated and settled in Paris, where Gavriil died in 1955.

The widowed Princess Tatiana fled to Romania and later to Switzerland with her children. She eventually became a nun in 1946, and died in Jerusalem in 1979, where she had been Abbess of the Orthodox Mount of Olives Convent since 1951.

Konstantin Konstantinovich's spouse and two youngest children, Prince George and Princess Vera, remained at Pavlovsk throughout the war, the chaotic rule of the Provisional Government, and after the October Revolution. In the fall of 1918, they were permitted by the Bolsheviks to be taken by ship to Sweden (on the Ångermanland, via Tallinn to Helsinki and via Mariehamn to Stockholm), at the invitation of the Swedish queen.

At Stockholm harbor they met prince Gustaf Adolf who took them to the royal palace. Elizaveta Mavrikievna and Vera and Georgi lived for the next two years in Sweden, first in Stockholm then in Saltsjöbaden. But Sweden was too expensive for them so they moved first to Belgium by invitation of Albert I of Belgium, and then to Germany, settling in Altenburg where they lived 30 years, except for a couple of years in England. Elizaveta died of cancer on 24 March 1927 in Leipzig. Prince Georgi died after surgery in New York City in 1938. Princess Vera lived in Germany until Soviet forces occupied the east part of the country, she fled to Hamburg and in 1951 she moved to United States and died there in 2001, in Nyack, New York.

== Archives ==
Documents about Grand Duke Konstantin Konstantinovich's family (including correspondence and photographs) are preserved in the "Romanov Family Papers" collection in the Hoover Institution Archives (Stanford, California, USA).

== Honours and awards ==
The Grand Duke received the following Russian and foreign decorations:

Russian

- Knight of St. Andrew, 26 September 1858
- Knight of St. Alexander Nevsky, 26 September 1858
- Knight of St. Anna, 1st Class, 26 September 1858
- Knight of the White Eagle, 26 September 1858
- Knight of St. Stanislaus, 1st Class, 11 June 1865
- Knight of St. George, 4th Class, 15 October 1877
- Knight of St. Vladimir, 4th Class, 1883; 3rd Class, 14 May 1896; 2nd Class, 1903; 1st Class, 1913

Foreign

- Austria-Hungary: Grand Cross of St. Stephen, 22 April 1897
- Kingdom of Bulgaria: Order of Merit, Grade I in Diamonds, 18 February 1910
- Denmark: Knight of the Elephant, 25 June 1875
- France:
  - Grand Cross of the Legion of Honour, 30 August 1875
  - Ordre des Palmes Académiques, 22 February 1894
- Kingdom of Prussia:
  - Pour le Mérite (military), 22 March 1879
  - Knight of the Black Eagle, 10 December 1883
- (Saxe-Coburg and Gotha) (Duchy of Saxe-Altenburg) (Saxe-Meiningen) Ernestine duchies: Grand Cross of the Saxe-Ernestine House Order, with Swords, 15 March 1878
- Grand Duchy of Hesse: Grand Cross of the Ludwig Order, 21 November 1893
- Mecklenburg:
  - Grand Cross of the Wendish Crown, Grand Cross, 16 August 1874
  - Military Merit Cross, 21 May 1878
- Oldenburg: Grand Cross of the Order of Duke Peter Friedrich Ludwig, with Golden Crown, 30 April 1878
- Württemberg: Grand Cross of the Württemberg Crown, 26 April 1874
- Kingdom of Greece: Knight of the Redeemer, 10 August 1875; Grand Cross, 21 May 1878
- Kingdom of Italy: Knight of the Annunciation, 16 July 1902 – during a visit to Russia of King Victor Emmanuel III of Italy
- Empire of Japan: Grand Cordon of the Order of the Chrysanthemum, 30 April 1909
- Principality of Montenegro: Medal for Military Distinction, 1 May 1878
- (Kingdom of Romania) Romania:
  - Medal for Military Virtue, 20 October 1877
  - Iron Cross for the Crossing of the Danube in 1877, 1878
- Principality of Serbia:
  - Medal for Military Merit, 1 May 1878
  - Grand Cross of the Star of Karađorđe, 11 August 1911
- (Thailand) Siam: Knight of the Order of the Royal House of Chakri, 7 September 1902 – during a visit to Russia of King Chulalongkorn of Siam

== Ancestry ==
Ancestors of Grand Duke Konstantin Konstantinovich of Russia

8. Paul I of Russia
4. Nicholas I of Russia
9. Duchess Sophie Dorothea of Württemberg
2. Grand Duke Konstantin Nikolayevich of Russia
10. Frederick William III of Prussia
5. Princess Charlotte of Prussia
11. Duchess Louise of Mecklenburg-Strelitz
1. Grand Duke Konstantin Konstantinovich of Russia
12. Frederick, Duke of Saxe-Altenburg
6. Joseph, Duke of Saxe-Altenburg
13. Duchess Charlotte Georgine of Mecklenburg-Strelitz
3. Princess Alexandra of Saxe-Altenburg
14. Duke Louis of Württemberg
7. Duchess Amelia of Württemberg
15. Princess Henriette of Nassau-Weilburg

Academic offices
Preceded by Dmitry Tolstoy	President of the Russian Academy of Sciences; 1889–1915	Succeeded by Alexander Karpinsky
