= Grand Duke Konstantin Nikolayevich of Russia =

Russian grand duke (1827–1892)

Grand Duke Konstantin Nikolayevich
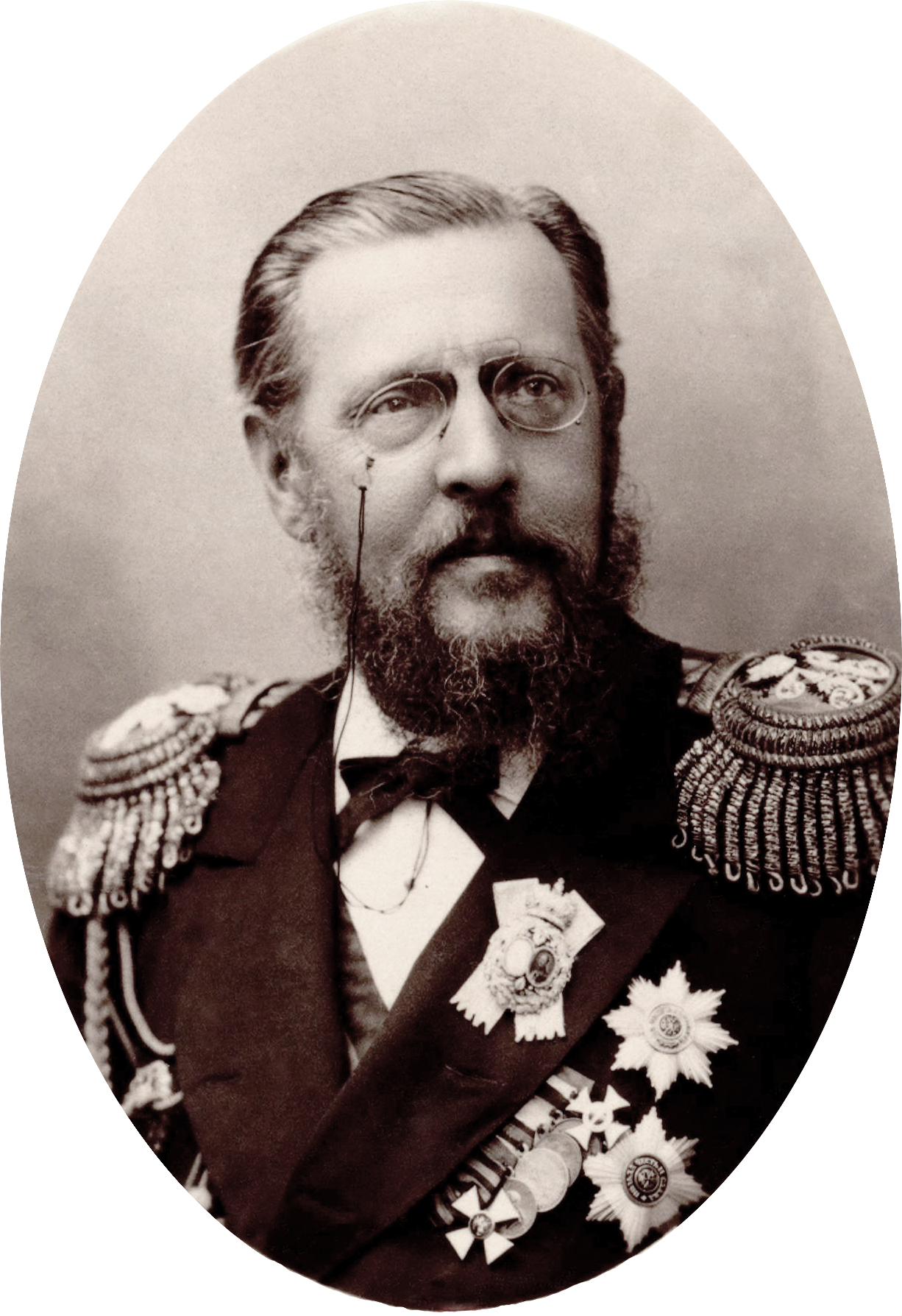
- Photograph, c. 1880

9th Viceroy of the Kingdom of Poland
- In office 27 May 1862 – 19 October 1863
- Monarch: Alexander II
- Preceded by: Alexander von Lüders
- Succeeded by: Friedrich Wilhelm Rembert von Berg
- Born: 21 September 1827; Winter Palace, Saint Petersburg, Russian Empire
- Died: 25 January 1892 (aged 64); Pavlovsk Palace, Pavlovsk, Russian Empire
- Burial: Grand Ducal Mausoleum, St. Petersburg, Russian Empire
- Spouse: Alexandra of Saxe-Altenburg (m. 1848)
- Issue Detail: Grand Duke Nicholas Konstantinovich; Olga Konstantinovna, Queen of the Hellenes; Vera Konstantinovna, Duchess Eugen of Württemberg; Grand Duke Konstantin Konstantinovich; Grand Duke Dimitri Konstantinovich; Grand Duke Vyacheslav Konstantinovich
Names
- Konstantin Nikolayevich Romanov; Russian: Никола́й Па́влович Рома́нов
- House: Holstein-Gottorp-Romanov
- Father: Nicholas I of Russia
- Mother: Charlotte of Prussia

Grand Duke Konstantin Nikolayevich of Russia (Russian: Вели́кий князь Константи́н Никола́евич; 21 September 1827 – 25 January 1892) was the Emperor's Viceroy of Poland from 1862 to 1863 and a general admiral of the Imperial Russian Navy.

== Early life ==
Konstantin Nikolayevich was born as the second son of Nicholas I and his wife, Charlotte of Prussia, daughter of Frederick William III of Prussia and his first wife, Louise of Mecklenburg-Strelitz.

== Biography ==
The Grand Duke was a supporter of the liberal (sometimes referred to as "enlightened") bureaucrats during the period of his brother Alexander II's great reforms. He served as chairman of the Imperial Russian Geographical Society (founded in 1845). The Geographical Society was subordinate to the Ministry of Internal Affairs, which was home to a conspicuous number of liberal bureaucrats, including Nikolai Miliutin.

In The Hague in June 1841, 13-year-old Konstantin met the pianist Anton Rubinstein during a performance for King William II. The two struck up a friendship, and Konstantin would become an important patron.

In addition to his support of and participation in the 1861 emancipation of the serfs, the Grand Duke also instituted reforms in the Imperial Russian Navy from 1854.

Konstantin's brother, Alexander II of Russia was supposed to have said: "Let the Poles have their own court and intrigues." Though the Grand Duke tried to show a liberal attitude towards the Poles, his efforts came too late and he was recalled with the outbreak of the January Uprising in 1863.

== Marriage and issue ==
In the Winter Palace in St Petersburg, on 11 September 1848, Konstantin married Alexandra of Saxe-Altenburg, daughter of Joseph, Duke of Saxe-Altenburg and his wife, Duchess Amelia of Württemberg. They had six children:

- Grand Duke Nicholas Konstantinovich of Russia (1850–1918)
- Olga Konstantinovna, Queen of the Hellenes (1851–1926)
- Grand Duchess Vera Konstantinovna of Russia (1854–1912)
- Grand Duke Konstantin Konstantinovich of Russia (1858–1915)
- Grand Duke Dmitry Konstantinovich of Russia (1860–1919)
- Grand Duke Vyacheslav Konstantinovich of Russia (1862–1879); died of brain hemorrhage

At the end of the 1860s, Konstantin embarked on an affair, having an illegitimate daughter, Marie Condousso.

Konstantin had five illegitimate children with his mistress Anna Kuznetsova (1847–1922); they bore the last name Knyazev:

- Sergey Konstantinovich Knyazev (1873–1873); died as an infant.
- Marina Konstantinovna Knyazeva (8 December 1875 – 8 June 1941); married Alexander Pavlovich Erchov on 23 April 1894. They had nine children.
- Anna Konstantinovna Knyazeva (16 March 1878 – 5 February 1920); married Nicholas Lialine on 17 April 1898. They had three children.
- Izmail Konstantinovich Knyazev (2 August 1879 – 1885); died of scarlet fever.
- Lev Konstantinovich Knyazev (April 1883 – 1885); died of scarlet fever.

He bought a house for his mistress at 18 English Embankment, which his great-nephew Nicholas II later bought to house his mistress, the dancer Mathilde Kschessinska.

Konstantin was the paternal great-great-grandfather of King Charles III of the United Kingdom, since his daughter Olga married George I of Greece, whose son Andrew married Princess Alice of Battenberg, and they became the parents of Philip, Charles' father. Through Constantine I of Greece, another son of Olga and George I, Konstantin is also the paternal great-great-grandfather of Queen Sofía of Spain, mother of King Felipe VI.

== In fiction ==
The Grand Duke is a central character in Act III of the novel Forty-Ninth by Boris Pronsky and Craig Britton. Konstantin is the force behind the liberal reforms enacted by his brother, Alexander II, as well as the sale of Alaska to the United States.

== Honours ==
National orders and decorations

- Knight of St. Andrew, 1827
- Knight of St. Alexander Nevsky, 1827
- Knight of the White Eagle, 1827
- Knight of St. Anna, 1st Class, 1827
- Knight of St. George, 4th Class, 1849
- Knight of St. Vladimir, 1st Class, 1853
- Knight of St. Stanislaus, 1st Class, 1865

Foreign orders and decorations

- Sweden-Norway:
  - Knight of the Seraphim, 12 June 1838
  - Grand Cross of St. Olav, 11 August 1865
- Kingdom of Prussia:
  - Knight of the Black Eagle, 14 June 1838; with Collar, 1857
  - Pour le Mérite (military), 18 August 1849
  - Grand Commander's Cross of the Royal House Order of Hohenzollern, 9 December 1865
- Denmark: Knight of the Elephant, 23 July 1844
- Saxe-Weimar-Eisenach: Grand Cross of the White Falcon, 19 September 1846
- (Saxe-Coburg and Gotha) (Duchy of Saxe-Altenburg) (Saxe-Meiningen) Ernestine duchies: Grand Cross of the Saxe-Ernestine House Order, October 1846
- Württemberg: Grand Cross of the Württemberg Crown, 1846
- Kingdom of Hanover:
  - Knight of St. George, 1847
  - Grand Cross of the Royal Guelphic Order, 1847
- Netherlands: Knight of the Military William Order, 3rd Class, 30 August 1849; Commander, 3 June 1857
- Austrian Empire:
  - Grand Cross of the Royal Hungarian Order of St. Stephen, 1849
  - Knight of the Military Order of Maria Theresa, 1849
- Kingdom of Bavaria: Knight of St. Hubert, 1849
- Duchy of Parma:
  - Grand Cross of St. Louis for Civil Merit, 1850
  - Senator Grand Cross of the Constantinian Order of St. George, 1852
- Oldenburg: Grand Cross of the Order of Duke Peter Friedrich Ludwig, with Golden Crown, 9 March 1853
- Grand Duchy of Hesse: Grand Cross of the Ludwig Order, 18 February 1857
- Kingdom of Sardinia: Knight of the Annunciation, 26 February 1857
- French Empire: Grand Cross of the Legion of Honour, May 1857
- Belgium: Grand Cordon of the Order of Leopold (military), 1 June 1857
- Baden:
  - Knight of the House Order of Fidelity, 1857
  - Grand Cross of the Zähringer Lion, 1857
- Kingdom of Saxony: Knight of the Rue Crown, 1857
- Two Sicilies: Grand Cross of St. Ferdinand and Merit
- Spain: Grand Cross of the Order of Charles III, 15 November 1880

== Ancestry ==
Ancestors of Grand Duke Konstantin Nikolayevich of Russia

8. Peter III of Russia
4. Paul I of Russia
9. Catherine the Great
2. Nicholas I of Russia
10. Frederick II Eugene, Duke of Württemberg
5. Duchess Sophie Dorothea of Württemburg
11. Princess Friederike of Brandenburg-Schwedt
1. Grand Duke Konstantin Nikolayevich of Russia
12. Frederick William II of Prussia
6. Frederick William III of Prussia
13. Frederica Louisa of Hesse-Darmstadt
3. Princess Charlotte of Prussia
14. Charles II, Grand Duke of Mecklenburg-Strelitz
7. Duchess Louise of Mecklenburg-Strelitz
15. Princess Friederike of Hesse-Darmstadt
