= Katoufs =

Katoufs, an old Greek expression that means "making a face", is the title of an illustrated children's book and notebook art collection by Princess Marie of Greece (1876–1940). Katoufs first appeared in a book titled Katoufs published by Williams & Norgate, London in 1925.

The Katoufs art collection was first licensed to Spiegel Catalog, Inc. for reproduction as a line of bedding, bath, and infant room decor. Again in 2001, Katoufs was licensed to Andrews McMeel Publishing and appeared as little gift books, stationery, greeting cards and note cards.
