= Princess Maria of Greece and Denmark =

Grand Duchess Maria Georgievna of Russia (1876–1940)

Princess Maria
- Grand Duchess Maria Georgievna of Russia
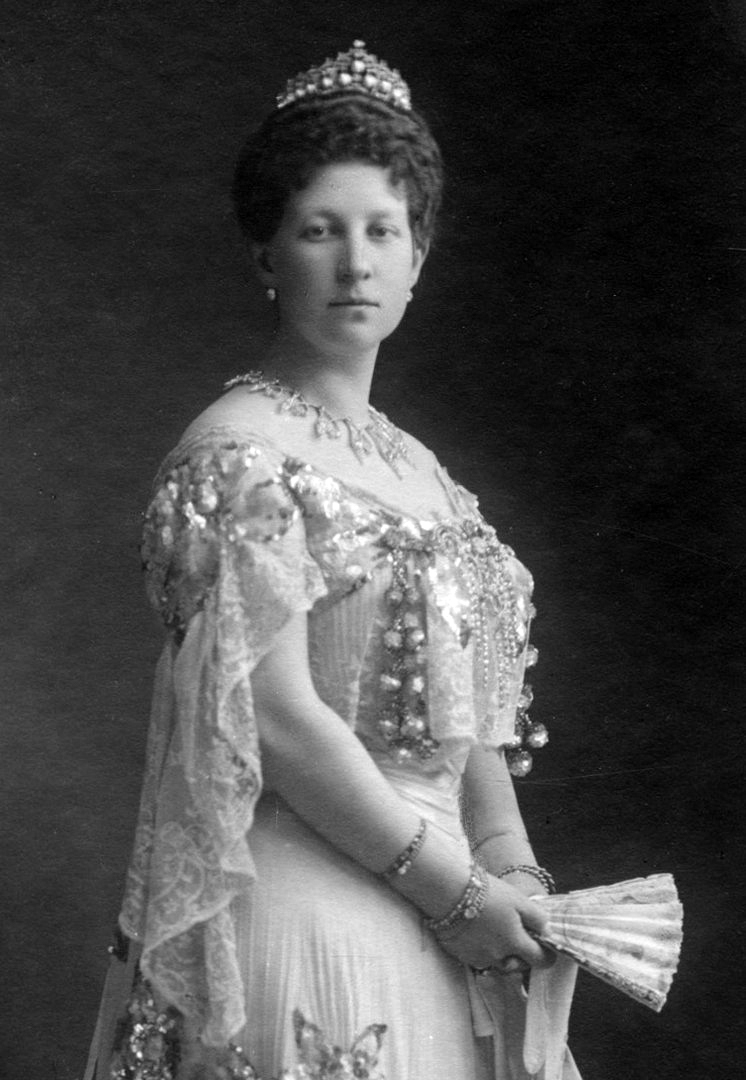
- Photograph, c. 1900
- Born: 3 March 1876; Athens, Greece
- Died: 14 December 1940 (aged 64); Athens, Greece
- Burial: Royal Cemetery, Tatoi Palace, Greece
- Spouses: Grand Duke George Mikhailovich of Russia (m. 1900; died 1919) Periklís Ioannídis (m. 1922)
- Issue: Princess Nina Georgievna; Princess Xenia Georgievna
- House: Glücksburg
- Father: George I of Greece
- Mother: Olga Constantinovna of Russia

Princess Maria of Greece and Denmark (Greek: Μαρία, romanized: María; Russian: Мария Георгиевна; 3 March [O.S. 20 February] 1876 – 14 December 1940) was a daughter of King George I of Greece and his wife Grand Duchess Olga Constantinovna of Russia. She was a sister of King Constantine I of Greece and a first cousin of Tsar Nicholas II of Russia and King George V of the United Kingdom.

Born as a princess of Greece and Denmark, she was educated in Athens by private tutors. Her father instilled in her a great love for Greece and throughout her life, she remained a fervent patriot. She married Grand Duke George Mikhailovich of Russia, her first cousin once removed, who courted her for five years. The wedding took place in 1900 in Corfu. The couple settled in St. Petersburg and they had two daughters: Princesses Nina (1901 -1974) and Xenia (1903 -1965).

Grand Duke George Mikhailovich had a house built for her in Crimea and he was a devoted father and husband, but the marriage was unhappy. Princess Maria, known upon her marriage as Grand Duchess Maria Georgievna of Russia, neither got to love her husband nor her adopted country. Longing for her native Greece, she never adapted to life in Russia. Over the years, she became estranged from her husband taking any opportunity to spend time abroad. At the outbreak of World War I, she was vacationing in England with her daughters and chose not to return to Russia. During the conflict, she was a patron of three military hospitals in Harrogate, which she financed generously.

Her husband was trapped in Russia after the revolution and he was shot by the Bolsheviks with several other Romanov relatives in January 1919. In her widowhood, deprived of her Russian income, Princess Maria faced serious financial difficulties. She returned to live in Greece with her daughters in 1920. There, she began a relationship with Admiral Perikles Ioannidis, who had been the commander of the ship that she took at her return to Athens. They were married in 1922. The proclamation of the Second Hellenic Republic in 1924, sent her into exile. The princess returned to live in Britain for a couple of years and she settled in Rome in 1926 with her second husband. She lived in Italy for over a decade until the outbreak of the Greco-Italian War in 1940 forced her to return to her native Greece. She was in poor health and was cared for by her nephew King Paul of Greece and his wife Frederica. She died, as the Greek royal family was about to leave for exile. She left a book of memoirs, published posthumously by her grandchildren with the title A Romanov Diary.

== Early life ==
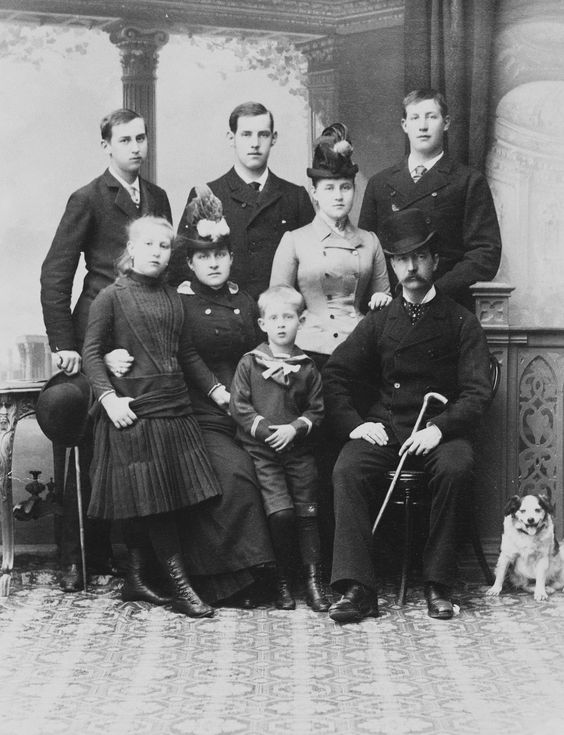
Princess Maria of Greece and Denmark with her parents and siblings.

Princess Maria of Greece and Denmark was born on 3 March [O.S. 20 February] 1876 at the Royal Palace in Athens. She was the fifth child and second daughter of King George I of Greece and Grand Duchess Olga Constantinovna of Russia. Maria's father was born a Danish prince. Thus, the Greek royal family was part of the Danish.

Princess Maria, nicknamed "Greek Minnie" to tell her apart from the elder "Minnie", her paternal aunt (Empress Maria Feodorovna of Russia), grew up as part of a large family of eight children. One sister, named Olga, died in childhood, but she had five brothers: (Constantine, George, Nicholas, Andrew, Christopher) and one surviving sister: Alexandra.

King George and Queen Olga were devoted parents who provided a happy, homely environment for their children. The Greek royal family was not wealthy by royal standards and they lived with simplicity. Throughout the year, following a regular pattern, they moved around their different properties. They began the year at the Royal Palace in Athens. On Sundays, they often visited Themistocles, the King's small estate at the entrance of the port of Piraeus. In the spring, they moved to Mon Repos, the family royal villa on the island of Corfu. During April, they toured the Greek provinces, choosing a different region each year. In the summer, the Greek royal family stayed in Tatoi, in the mountains north of Athens, until mid-October before returning to the Royal Palace for the winter.

King George was a strict and demanding father, but contrary to the general approach of the time, he believed in happy rambunctious children. Maria and her siblings were mischievous, playing pranks, even taking "bike rides" through the long corridors of the Royal palace, sometimes led by the King himself.

== Education ==
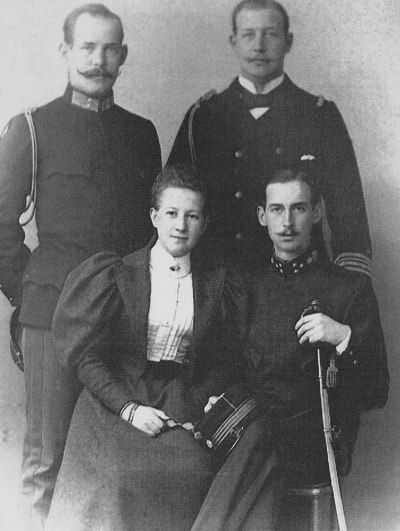
Princess Maria of Greece and Denmark with her three eldest brothersːConstantine (on the left standing), George (standing on the right) and Nicholas (sitting).

Maria and her siblings were raised by British nannies and educated by governesses and private tutors. English was the children's first language. They spoke Greek between themselves and English with their parents. Maria's education followed the conventions for princesses of her time. There was an emphasis on languages and she learned German, English, and French besides her native Greek. She studied mathematics, history, literature, and geography. In addition, she was taught court etiquette, Orthodox religion, drawing, painting, music, dancing and learned to play the piano. She also practiced horse riding, gymnastics and took singing lessons.

As Maria's eldest brothers were already occupied by their studies, she grew up closer to her sister Alexandra and her brother Nicholas, who preceded her in age. She was short and dark, less pretty than her sister but more vivacious. Family reunions took her many times abroad. She visited Wiesbaden, Germany in 1882. In 1886, her mother took her to Russia for the first time. They stayed with the Romanovs at Pavlovsk, the home of her maternal grandmother.

Every two years, Princess Maria spent holidays in Denmark, visiting her paternal grandparents. At Fredensborg Palace on the island of Zealand, Maria and her siblings met their Russian and British cousins in large family gatherings. She became lifelong friends with two of her cousins: Grand Duchess Xenia of Russia and Princess Victoria of the United Kingdom.

== A Princess of Greece ==
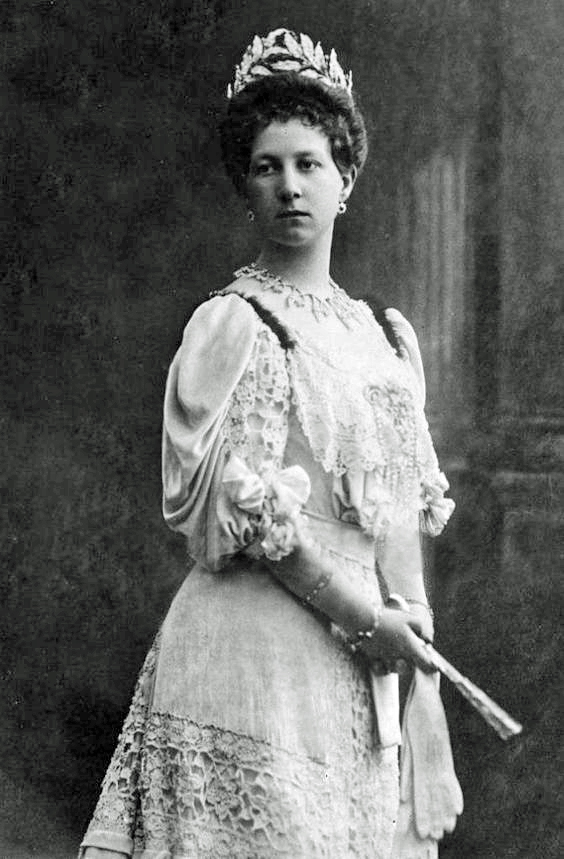
Princess Maria of Greece and Denmark in her youth.

King George I instilled in his offspring a great love for Greece. He used to tell them: "Never forget that you are strangers among the Greeks, and make sure that they never remember". As a consequence, she would remain all her life intensely Greek. As a child, she cried when she was told she belonged to a foreign dynasty and had no Greek blood. As an adult, she always looked at Athens as her home. In her book of memoirs, she described herself as: " A true daughter of Greece".

The popular desire to unite all Greeks within a single territory (Megali Idea) led to a revolt in Crete against the Turkish rule. In February 1897, King George sent his son, Prince George, to take possession of the island. To support the Cretan cause Greek troops crossed the Macedonian border and Abdul Hamid II declared war. During the conflict, Queen Olga organized a military hospital and Princess Maria served as a nurse. The Greco-Turkish War of 1897 went badly for the ill-prepared Greeks. They were forced to give up Crete to international administration, and agree to minor territorial concessions in favor of the Turks and to a monetary indemnity.

Since her sister Alexandra's marriage in 1889, Princess Maria became her father's favorite child and constant companion. She helped her father acting as his unofficial secretary as her mother, Queen Olga, suffered from bad eyesight. On 27 February 1898, father and daughter were returning from a ride in a landau to the beach at Phaleron, when they were shot at by two riflemen. The King tried to shield his daughter; both were unhurt though a footman and both horses were wounded. A church was later built on the site of the assassination attempt.

== A Russian marriage ==
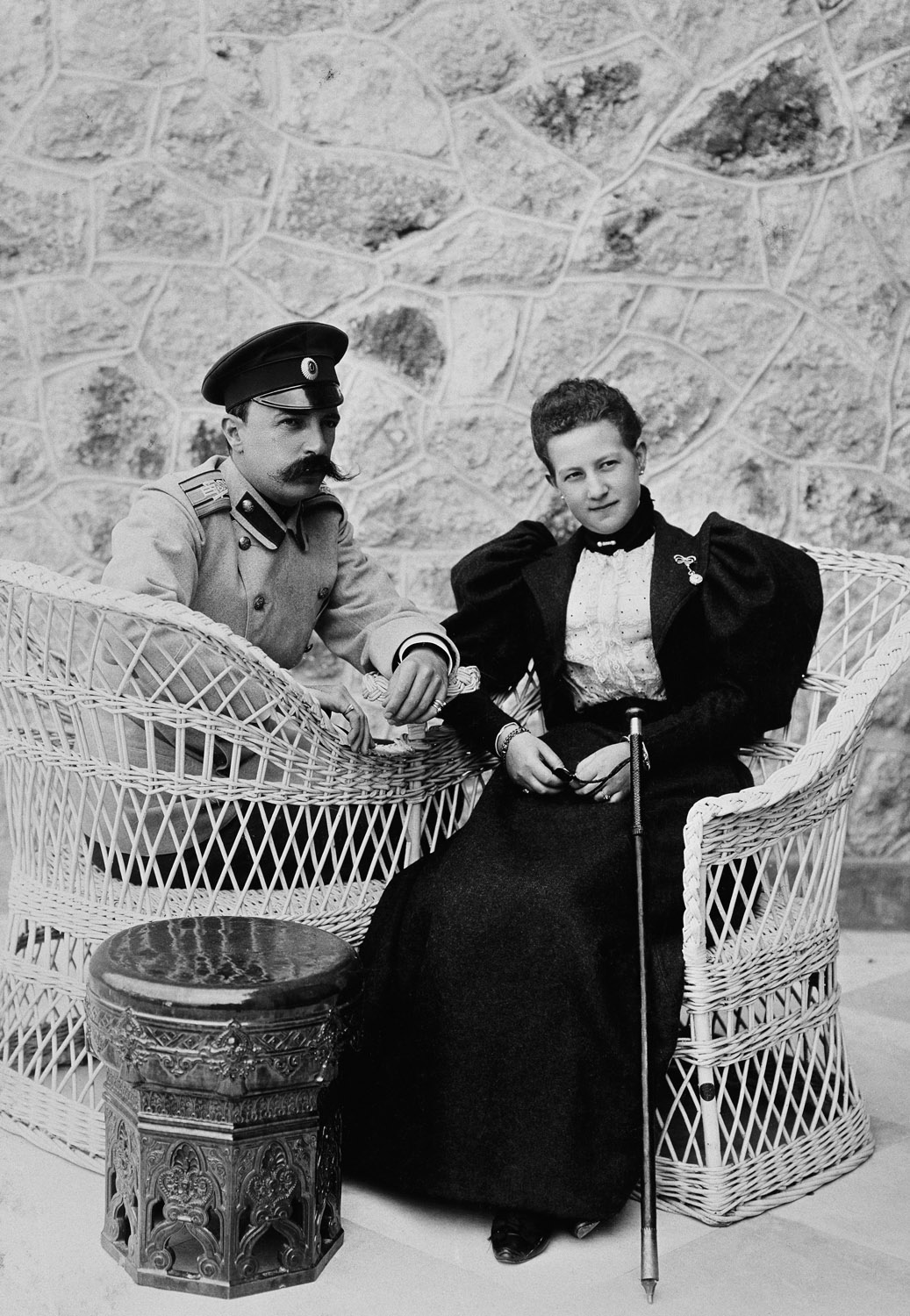
Grand Duke George Mikhailovich of Russia and Princess Marie of Greece, 1896.

Princess Maria wanted to spend her entire life in Greece instead of following the traditional path of Princesses of her time that had to marry a foreign prince and move abroad. In her late teens, she fell in love with a Greek commoner, but her parents did not allow her to contract an unequal union.

She just turned twenty years old when, in April 1896, during the Olympics games held in Athens, King Alexander I of Serbia (last representative of the Obrenović dynasty) proposed to her. Princess Maria found King Alexander too ugly and rejected him.

Since her childhood, Princess Maria of Greece had visited Russia many times with her mother, who remained very attached to her native country. They usually stayed at Pavlovsk Palace with Princess Maria's maternal grandmother, Grand Duchess Alexandra Iosifovna. While in Russia, in summer 1894, for the wedding of her cousin Grand Duchess Xenia to Grand Duke Alexander Mikhailovich, Princess Maria became smitten with the groom's brother, Grand Duke George Mikhailovich of Russia, who was her mother's first cousin. However, he had no interest in her then. In a subsequent visit to Russia in the autumn of 1895, they were reunited at a Court Ball. This time she found him too old and boring and was no longer interested. On the other hand, he fell in love with her and asked to marry him. She turned him down, to the dismay of Maria's mother, Queen Olga, who was in favor of a Russian marriage for her daughter.

In spring 1896, Grand Duke George Mikhailovich arrived in Athens and proposed while they were playing billiards. She accepted him and the engagement was officially announced on 4 April 1896. The wedding was to take place a few months later in the summer. However, she had a change of heart and after putting off the wedding date twice, she broke off the engagement in October.

For five years, Grand Duke George Mikhailovich of Russia persisted in his intention. Twice a year, he proposed to Princess Maria who continued refusing him. Tsar Nicholas II finally intervened, telling the grand duke to make only one more attempt and give up. George Mikhailovich arrived in Greece in spring 1900. This time, under pressure from her family, the Greek princess finally accepted his proposal, yet reluctantly. She made clear that for her it was a marriage of convenience and that her feelings were not going to change. Before she had a change of heart, Queen Olga hurried the wedding. The marriage took place in Greece at the church of the old Venetian fortress in Corfu on 12 May [O.S. 30 April] 1900. It was a relatively simple ceremony with the reception held at the Greek Royal family residence in Corfu: Mon Repos. She was then 24 years old and her husband 37.

== Grand Duchess of Russia ==
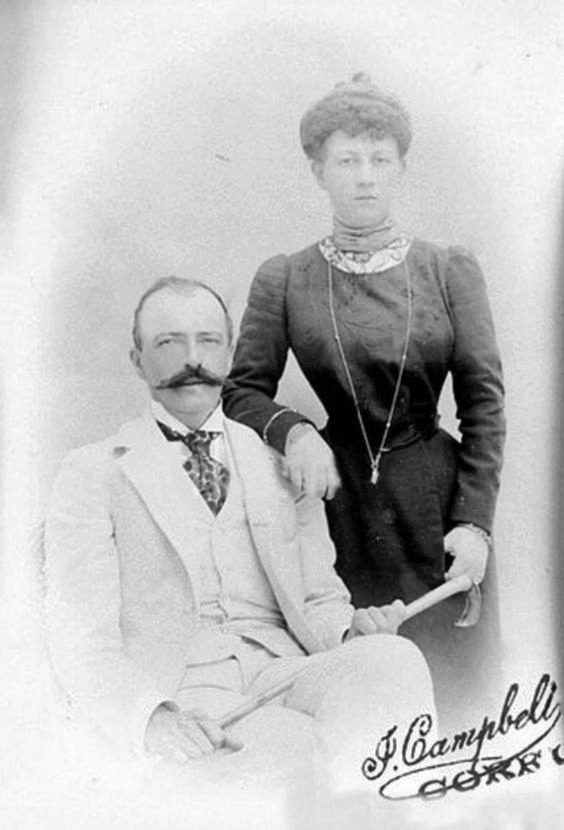
Grand Duchess Maria Georgievna and her husband Grand Duke George Mikhailovich of Russia in Corfu during Easter 1900 on the eve of their wedding.

After the wedding, the couple boarded the Greek royal yacht and sailed to the Bay of Naples. They spent their honeymoon in Italy and traveled around Austria-Hungary. From Vienna, they arrived in Russia by the way of Warsaw. Princess Maria of Greece, known in Russia as Grand Duchess Maria Georgievna of Russia, was welcomed by the Romanovs as one of their own. Her mother, Queen Olga of Greece, was a Russian Grand Duchess by birth, a first cousin of Tsar Alexander III of Russia. Maria's father, King George of Greece, was Empress Maria Feodorovna's favorite brother. Maria was a first cousin of Tsar Nicholas II, who she had known all her life.

Grand Duchess Maria and her husband settled in apartments located within the New Michael Palace on the Palace Quay in Saint Petersburg, the household of her father-in-law, Grand Duke Michael Nicholaievich. They shared the large palace with the Grand Duke's widowed father and two unmarried brothers: Grand Duke Nicholas Mikhailovich, and Grand Duke Sergei Mihailovich, to whom Maria Gerogievna became particularly close. The family had Milkhailovkoye near Peterhof as their summer country retreat. Grand Duke George Mikhailovich had an injury in one leg in his youth, which curtailed the active military career he would have wanted; he occupied his time as director of the Alexander III museum where he moved his large numismatic collection.

Two days after Empress Alexandra Feodorovna gave birth to her fourth daughter, Grand Duchess Anastasia Nikolaevna, Grand Duchess Maria Georgievna gave birth to her first child, Princess Nina Georgievna on 20 June [7 June] 1901. Two years, two months and two days later on 22 August 1903, she had her second daughter and last child Princess Xenia Georgievna. Shortly after Xenia's birth, Grand Duchess Maria's father in law became paralyzed by a stroke and moved permanently to the south of France to recover.

During the years living in Russia (1900–1914), Grand Duchess Maria traveled frequently to the South of France, Denmark, England, Germany, Italy and yearly to her native Greece. In the summer of 1900, Maria Georgievna visited Crimea with her husband. It was there, in a piece of land Grand Duke George had bought in the 1890s near Ai-Todor, on a high cliff above the sea, that the couple decided to build their residence. They commissioned the construction to Nikolay Petrovich Krasnov, a Russian architect who had built the palace of Dulber between 1895 and 1897 for Grand Duke Peter Nikolaevich, and who would build the white Palace at Livadia for Tsar Nicholas II and his wife Alexandra between (1910–1911).

=== Harax ===
Grand Duchess Maria Georgievna and her husband Grand Duke George Mikhailovich of Russia with their two daughters. 1908

As Grand Duchess Maria Georgievna was very fond of everything English, the villa was constructed in the English style with local limestone, but they gave the property a Greek name, Harax, the fortress, in memory of an ancient fortress that once stood on the tip of Ai-Todor. The couple was very involved in the planning as both were skillful artists. Grand Duchess Maria sketched the exterior elevations and draw floor plans while Grand Duke George painted renderings in watercolors and pen and ink sketches.

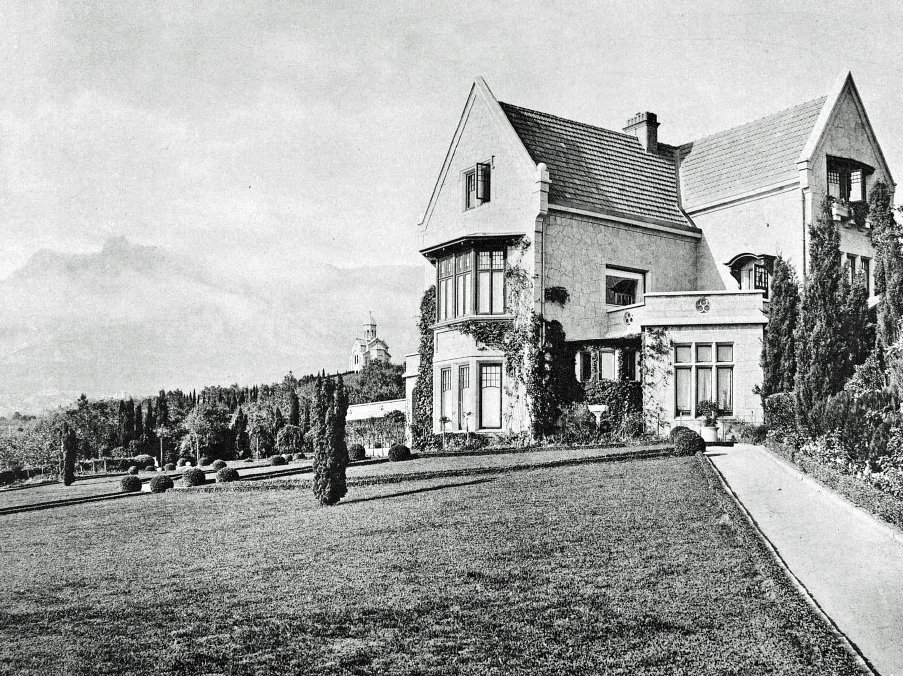
Harax, the villa of Grand Duchess Maria Georgievna and her husband in Crimea, constructed in the English style. 1913.

Construction took place between 1905 and 1907. Harax, encompassing 46 rooms, lay upon a gray stone foundation extending to the surrounding terraces in a cruciform plan. The two-story house, overlooking the Black Sea with a red-tiled roof and dotted with chimneys, was decorated by the Grand Duchess with English furniture, silverware, textiles, and wallpaper all imported from England. The property was later expanded adding a farm, a playhouse for their daughters, housing for their staff's family and a church in 1908. Husband and wife both took on gardening with enthusiasm working on the surrounding park. As Harax was on walking distance from Livadia Palace, the residence in Crimea of Tsar Nicholas II and his immediate family, the Tsar and his children were frequent visitors.

For seven years the Grand Duke and his wife led a quiet life in Crimea, returning to St Petersburg in the winter for the social season at the Imperial capital. With a poor command of Russian, Grand Duchess Maria spoke in French with her husband and in English with her daughters. Princess Nina, the eldest was described by Baroness Agnes von Stoeckl as "dark, calm and indolent" while Xenia, the youngest was "blond, vivacious and full of life". Both girls were very much doted on by their parents. Grand Duchess Maria hired an English nanny to educate them.

On 18 March 1913, King George I was assassinated in Thessalonica, a city that Greece had seized on during the First Balkan War. For Maria Georgieva, who had been so close to her father it was a terrible blow. For many weeks, she was inconsolable. A few weeks later, still grieving, she had to take part in the ceremonies which marked the tercentenary of the Romanov dynasty. By 1914 the relationship between the Grand Duchess and her husband had deteriorated. Grand Duke George was a devoted father and husband, but the Grand Duchess never fell in love with him. She never liked Russia either and eventually became estranged from her husband.

== War and Revolution ==
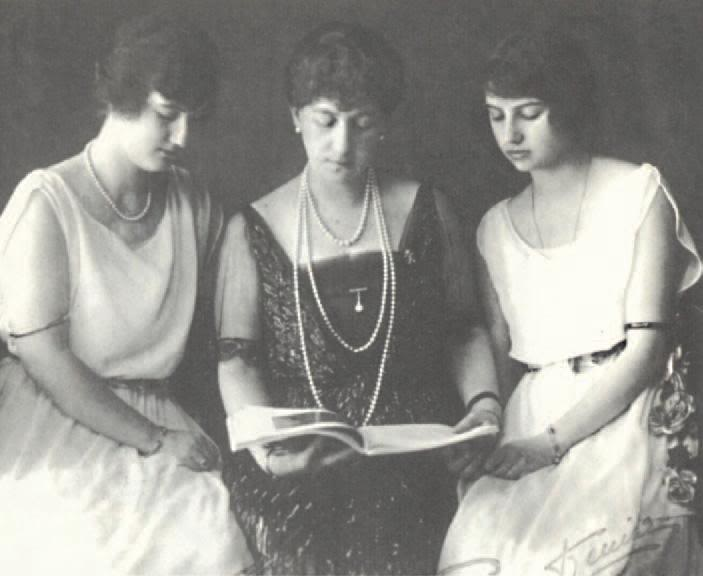
Grand Duchess Maria Georgievna with her two daughters. 1917.

In the summer of 1914, the Grand Duchess left Russia with her two daughters and her lady in waiting, Baroness Agnes von Stoeckl for England to improve her daughter Xenia's frail health with the mineral waters of the Spa town of Harrogate, where they had been three times before. In reality, she wanted a trial separation from her husband. The Grand Duke accompanied them to Warsaw in July. They would never see each other again.

After a stay at the Claridge's Hotel, the Princess moved to Harrogate, where Grand Duke George Mikhailovich was going to join them a few weeks later. However, the outbreak of World War I on 28 July 1914 thwarted their plans. Grand Duke George was forced to cancel his trip as he had to resume his duties in the Tsarist army. For her part, Grand Duchess Maria declined the chance to rush back to Russia with her aunt the Empress Maria Feodorovna, who was in London that summer. Instead, the Grand Duchess decided to extend her stay in the United Kingdom with her daughters and later used the dangers involved in a trip back during wartime in not attempting a return to Russia.

Determine to help with the war of the Triple Entente against the Central Powers, Grand Duchess Maria founded a small military hospital N 2 in Harrogate. Aimed at British and Canadian naval men wounded in the war. She undertook a Red Cross nursing course and already had experience of army medical service as a young princess in Greece, nursing patients herself. This institution was so successful that by 1915 the Grand Duchess eventually created two other hospitals: N 3 and a home for convalescent patients in Harrogate. During the four years of the war, more than 1200 patients were treated there. Impressed by her work, her cousin, King George V, conferred her the Royal Red Cross in July 1915.

During the war years, Grand Duchess Maria lived with her daughters in Harrogate until July 1916 when they moved to a large mansion in Grosvenor Square in London. Very close to the British Royal Family, she went to Marlborough House almost every evening to dine and play cards with Queen Alexandra. Grand Duchess Maria also regularly visited her cousin, Princess Victoria of the United Kingdom, her close friend since childhood. She continued to go to Harrogate frequently to be in charge of her hospitals.

The outbreak of the Russian Revolution in 1917 disrupted the daily life of Grand Duchess Maria and her daughters, who ceased to receive income from St. Petersburg. Unable to subsidize any longer the hospitals she patronized, the Grand Duchess entrusted them to the protection of her aunt Queen Alexandra. At the request of her patients, however, she remained the director until the end of the war. Her reduced financial circumstances forced Grand Duchess Maria to move to a smaller residence next to Regent's Park. It was through the financial support of her future sister-in-law, the wealthy American Nancy Leeds, that the Grand Duchess was able to maintain her finances afloat.

In 1918, Grand Duke George Mikhailovich was arrested by the Bolsheviks as he sought to emigrate to Britain. Alarmed with the fate of her husband, Maria Georgievna made many efforts to obtain her husband's release, along with others of her Russian relatives. Through the Danish Embassy, she tried to obtain their freedom in return for £50,000 without success.

After several months of uncertainty, the Grand Duke was finally shot on 30 January 1919 at the Peter and Paul Fortress by the Bolsheviks. Along with her husband, Maria lost her brother-in-law Grand Duke Nicholas Mikhailovich, her former brother-in-law Grand Duke Paul Alexandrovich and her younger maternal uncle, Grand Duke Dimitri Constantinovich.

== A Greek marriage ==
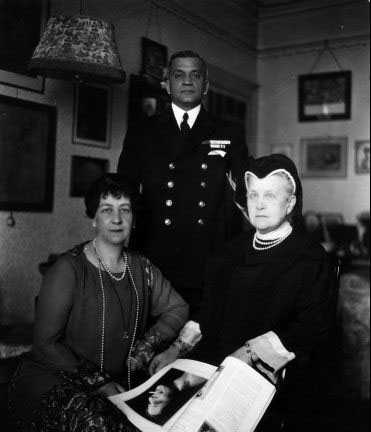
Queen Olga, Princess Maria of Greece and her second husband Admiral Ioannides.

In her widowhood, Princess Maria of Greece reverted to her original name and title and her focus shifted to her own family.

At the outbreak of World War I, as Greece had been weakened by the Balkan Wars, King Constantine I opted for his country's neutrality. Both the Kaiser, on one side, and the British and the French, on the other, derided him for it. His prime minister, Eleftherios Venizelos, who wanted Greece to enter the conflict on the side of the allies, clashed with the King. In order to force the Greeks to join the allied cause, the French bombarded Athens and demanded King Constantine's departure. He was forced to leave the country, and on 10 June 1917, he was replaced as King by his second son Alexander. Greece entered the war on the side of the allies while the Greek Royal Family left for exile in Switzerland with the sole exception of King Alexander. With the tumultuous political situation in Greece, Princess Maria could not count on the support of her relatives. While on a visit to Paris, Princess Maria met her nephew Alexander who Venizelos kept isolated from the Greek Royal Family.

King Alexander died in October 1920, following an infection from a monkey bite, and a plebiscite restored King Constantine I on the throne. Princess Maria and her two daughters then joined King Constantine and the Greek Royal family in Italy, where the small group boarded a ship of the Hellenic Navy towards Corfu. Then, members of the royal family continue their journey aboard the destroyer Ierax, which took them to Athens. During this trip, Princess Maria met the commander of the ship, Admiral Perikles Ioannidis. Widowed and determined to end her days with "Greek blood", the princess was smitten with the Greek Admiral. Five years her junior, Ioannidis had just spent three years in Venizelist jails because of his support for the monarchy.

Back in Greece, Maria settled in Athens. She was much loved by the royal family, even winning the affection of the wife of the Diadochos George, Princess Elizabeth of Romania, whose relationship with the rest of her in-laws was difficult.

On the other hand, Princess Maria's relationship with her daughters was strained. The princesses resented that their mother had kept them away from their father during the war. That they never were able to see him again, as Grand Duke George Mikhailovich had been killed during the Russian Revolution, only increased their resentment and they disapproved of their mother's relationship with Ioannidis. In part to distance themselves from their mother, both daughters married early. In 1921, 17-year-old, Princess Xenia married William Bateman Leeds Jr., son of Nancy Leeds. Princess Nina was married in London in September 1922 to Prince Paul Chavchavadze (1899–1971), son of Prince Alexander Chavchavadze and Maria Rodzianko.

The same month King Constantine had to abdicate after Greece lost the Greco-Turkish War of 1919–1922. Princess Maria's eldest nephew succeeded him as King George II of Greece on 27 September 1922.

Three months later, despite her daughters' opposition, Princess Maria married Admiral Pericles Ioannides on 16 December 1922 in Wiesbaden, Germany.

== A wandering life ==
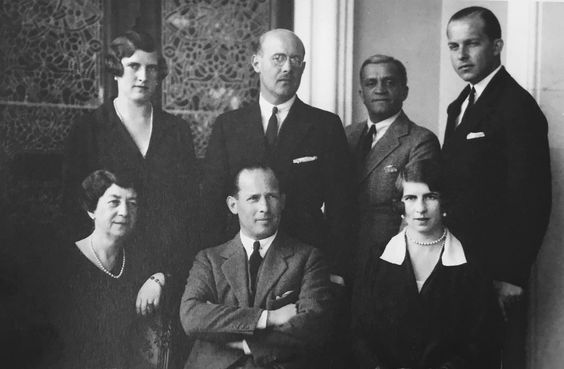
Princess Maria of Greece, her nephew King George II and her niece Helena (sitting in front). Standing in the back: Princess Irene, Prince Christopher, Admiral Ioannides and Paul of Greece .

After a honeymoon in Frankfurt and Munich Princess Maria of Greece and her second husband returned to Athens. They left Greece at the time of the proclamation of the Second Hellenic Republic in 1924.

The couple moved to London to the house the Princess had in Regent's Park where they lived for a couple of years. The Greek Princess devoted herself to drawing and she made a series of whimsical illustrations in color of exotic people and animals that she called "Katoufs" "making a face" in Greek. She published her drawing as a children's book in 1925 with rhymes written by Princess Maria Trubetskoy, née Rodzianko (1877–1958). The two women dedicated the book to their common grandson, Prince David Chavchavadze.

Princess Maria was Queen Alexandra's favorite niece and she was her constant companion during the Queen's last years at Sandringham. After her two daughters had moved to the United States and her aunt Queen Alexandra had died, Princess Maria and her husband moved to Rome in 1926. Many members of the Greek royal family were also living in Italy. The Princess acquired a residence, the Villa Attica, located on via Antonio-Bertoloni. The couple followed a relatively simple existence, and Princess Maria divided her time between gardening and the writing of her memoirs, published years later by her grandchildren. Maria was an inveterate backgammon player while her husband carefully monitored their expenses. In 1933, she visited the United States for a couple of months to see her daughters and two grandchildren staying on Long Island.

== Later life ==
Grand Duchess Maria Georgievna died in her native Athens during the Greco-Italian War (28 October 1940 – 30 April 1941) Her daughter Xenia lived for years in Long Island and was for a time married to millionaire William Leeds, son of Nancy Stewart Worthington Leeds and the stepson of Maria's brother Prince Christopher. She took in for a few months a woman later found to be an impostor, Anna Anderson. Anderson fraudulently claimed to be Grand Duchess Anastasia Nikolaevna of Russia, the youngest daughter of her cousin, Emperor Nicholas II, and was forced to leave Xenia's house at the demand of William Leeds. Grand Duchess Maria never recognized Anderson.

== Ancestry ==
Ancestors of Princess Maria of Greece and Denmark

8. Frederick William, Duke of Schleswig-Holstein-Sonderburg-Glücksburg
4. Christian IX of Denmark
9. Princess Louise Caroline of Hesse-Kassel
2. George I of Greece
10. Prince William of Hesse-Cassel
5. Princess Louise of Hesse-Kassel
11. Princess Charlotte of Denmark
1. Princess Maria of Greece and Denmark
12. Nicholas I of Russia
6. Grand Duke Constantine Nikolaevich of Russia
13. Princess Charlotte of Prussia
3. Grand Duchess Olga Constantinovna of Russia
14. Joseph, Duke of Saxe-Altenburg
7. Princess Alexandra of Saxe-Altenburg
15. Duchess Amelia of Württemberg
