= Grand Duke George Mikhailovich of Russia (1863–1919) =

Russian grand duke and general

Grand Duke George Mikhailovich
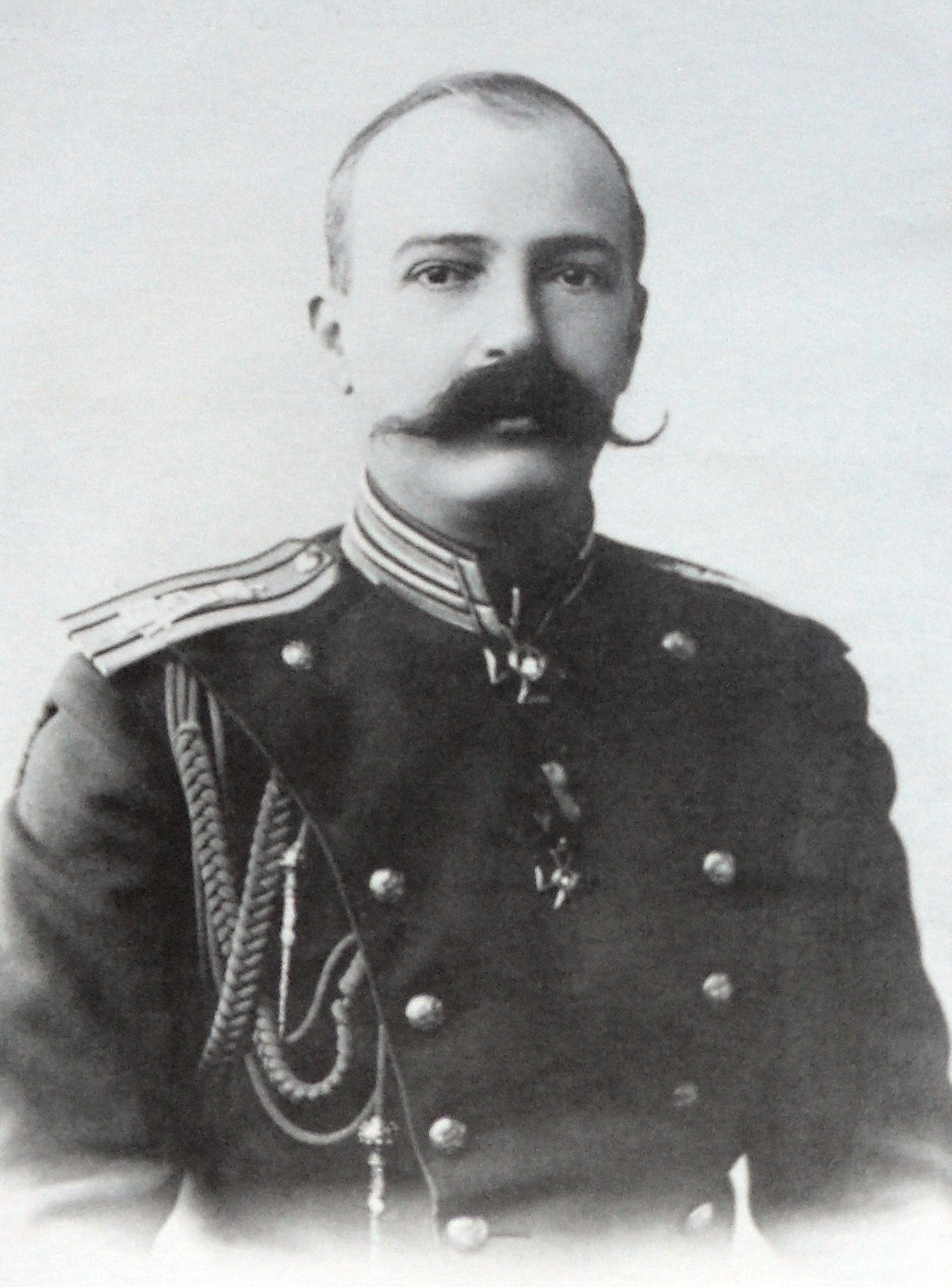
- Born: 23 August 1863; Bely Klyuch, Tiflis Governorate, Russian Empire
- Died: 28 January 1919 (aged 55); Peter and Paul Fortress, Petrograd, Russian Socialist Federative Soviet Republic
- Cause of death: Murder
- Spouse: Princess Maria of Greece and Denmark (m. 1900)
- Issue: Princess Nina Georgievna; Princess Xenia Georgievna
- House: Holstein-Gottorp-Romanov
- Father: Grand Duke Michael Nikolaevich of Russia
- Mother: Princess Cecilie of Baden

Grand Duke George Mikhailovich of Russia (Russian: Георгий Михайлович; 23 August 1863 – 28 January 1919) was a Grand Duke of Russia, first cousin of Emperor Alexander III of Russia and a General in the Russian army. Born in Tbilisi while his father was the Governor-General of Russian provinces of Transcaucasia, he was the second surviving son of Grand Duke Michael Nikolaevich of Russia and Princess Cecilie of Baden. His paternal grandparents were Emperor Nicholas I of Russia and Princess Charlotte of Prussia. His maternal grandparents were Leopold, Grand Duke of Baden and Princess Sophie of Sweden.

On 27 January 1919, George was moved to Peter and Paul Fortress in Petrograd, and in the early hours of the following day, he was shot there by a firing squad, along with his brother, Grand Duke Nicholas Mikhailovich, and his cousins Grand Dukes Paul Alexandrovich and Dmitri Constantinovich.

== Family ==
Grand Duke George Mikhailovich with his wife and two daughters.

On 30 April 1900 at Corfu, Grand Duke George married Princess Maria, daughter of King George I of the Hellenes and Grand Duchess Olga Constantinovna of Russia. Maria was George's paternal first cousin once removed.

Grand Duke George Mikhailovich and his wife Grand Duchess Maria Georgievna had two daughters:

- Princess Nina Georgievna of Russia (20 June 1901 – 27 February 1974); married in 1922 Prince Paul Chavchavadze, with whom she had one son, Prince David Chavchavadze.
- Princess Xenia Georgievna of Russia (22 August 1903 – 17 September 1965); married, firstly, in 1921, William Bateman Leeds, Jr., son of Princess Anastasia of Greece and Denmark; they divorced in 1930. Married, secondly, in 1946, Herman Jud. Xenia's only daughter, Nancy Leeds (1925–2006), married Edward Judson Wynkoop, Jr.

== Honours and awards ==
The Grand Duke received several Russian and foreign decorations:

Russian

- Knight of the Order of St. Andrew
- Knight of the Order of Saint Alexander Nevsky
- Knight of the Order of St. Anna, 1st Class
- Knight of the Order of Saint Stanislaus, 1st Class
- Knight of the Order of the White Eagle

Foreign

- Württemberg: Grand Cross of the Württemberg Crown, 1880
- Grand Duchy of Hesse: Grand Cross of the Ludwig Order, 15 June 1884
- Kingdom of Prussia: Knight of the Order of the Black Eagle, 16 September 1884
- (Austrian Empire) (Kingdom of Hungary) Austria-Hungary: Grand Cross of the Royal Hungarian Order of Saint Stephen, 1884
- Baden:
  - Knight of the House Order of Fidelity, 1885
  - Knight of the Order of Berthold the First, 1885
- Denmark: Knight of the Order of the Elephant, 7 September 1900
- Kingdom of Italy: Knight of the Order of the Most Holy Annunciation, 13 July 1902 – during a visit to Russia of King Victor Emmanuel III of Italy
- Principality of Montenegro: Grand Cross of the Order of Prince Danilo I

== See also ==
- Grand Duke George Mikhailovich of Russia

== Ancestry ==
Ancestors of Grand Duke George Mikhailovich of Russia (1863–1919)

8. Paul I of Russia
4. Nicholas I of Russia
9. Sophie Dorothea of Württemberg
2. Grand Duke Michael Nikolaevich of Russia
10. Frederick William III of Prussia
5. Charlotte of Prussia
11. Louise of Mecklenburg-Strelitz
1. Grand Duke George Mikhailovich of Russia
12. Charles Frederick, Grand Duke of Baden
6. Leopold, Grand Duke of Baden
13. Luise Karoline Geyer von Geyersberg
3. Cecilie of Baden
14. Gustav IV Adolf of Sweden
7. Sophie of Sweden
15. Frederica of Baden

== Bibliography ==
- Alexander, Grand Duke of Russia. Once a Grand Duke. Cassell, London, 1932, ASIN: B000J3ZFL2
- Chavchavadze, David. The Grand Dukes, Atlantic, 1989, ISBN 0-938311-11-5
- Cockfield, Jamie H. White Crow: The Life and Times of the Grand Duke Nicholas Mikhailovich Romanov 1859–1919. Praeger, 2002, ISBN 0-275-97778-1
- Marie Georgievna, Grand Duchess of Russia. A Romanov Diary: the Autobiography of the Grand Duchess Marie Georgievna of Russia. Gilbert's Books, 2012. ISBN 978-09865310-6-4
