= Princess Nina Georgievna of Russia =

Princess Nina Georgievna
- Princess Paul Aleksandrovich Chavchavadze
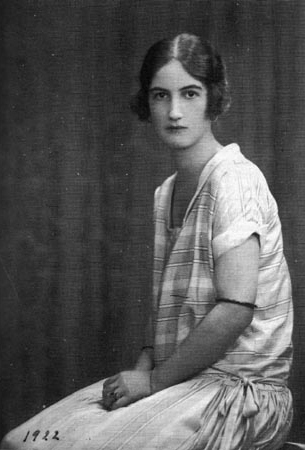
- Princess Nina in 1922
- Born: 20 June 1901; New Mikhailovsky Palace, St. Petersburg, Russian Empire
- Died: 27 February 1974 (aged 72); Wellfleet, Massachusetts, U.S.
- Spouse: Prince Paul Aleksandrovich Chavchavadze (m. 1922; died 1971)
- Issue: Prince David Chavchavadze
- House: Holstein-Gottorp-Romanov
- Father: Grand Duke George Mikhailovich
- Mother: Princess Maria of Greece and Denmark

Princess Nina Georgievna of Russia (Russian: Нина Георгиевна) (20 June 1901 – 27 February 1974), was the elder daughter of Grand Duke George Mikhailovich and Grand Duchess Maria Georgievna of Russia. A great-granddaughter of Tsar Nicholas I of Russia, she left her native country in 1914, before World War I, finished her education in England, and spent the rest of her life in exile. In London in 1922, she married Prince Paul Chavchavadze, a descendant of the last king of Georgia. They had one child, Prince David Chavchavadze, born there two years later. In 1927 the family of three moved to the United States and settled in New York. In 1939 they bought a home in Wellfleet, Massachusetts. Princess Nina was an artist, her husband worked as an author; he wrote five books and translated several others. Their son, Prince David Chavchavadze, served with the U.S. Army during World War II and, thanks in part to his knowledge of Russian, eventually became a CIA officer. After his retirement, he wrote his memoirs and published those of his grandmother, Grand Duchess George, as well as a book about the grand dukes of Russia.

== Early life ==
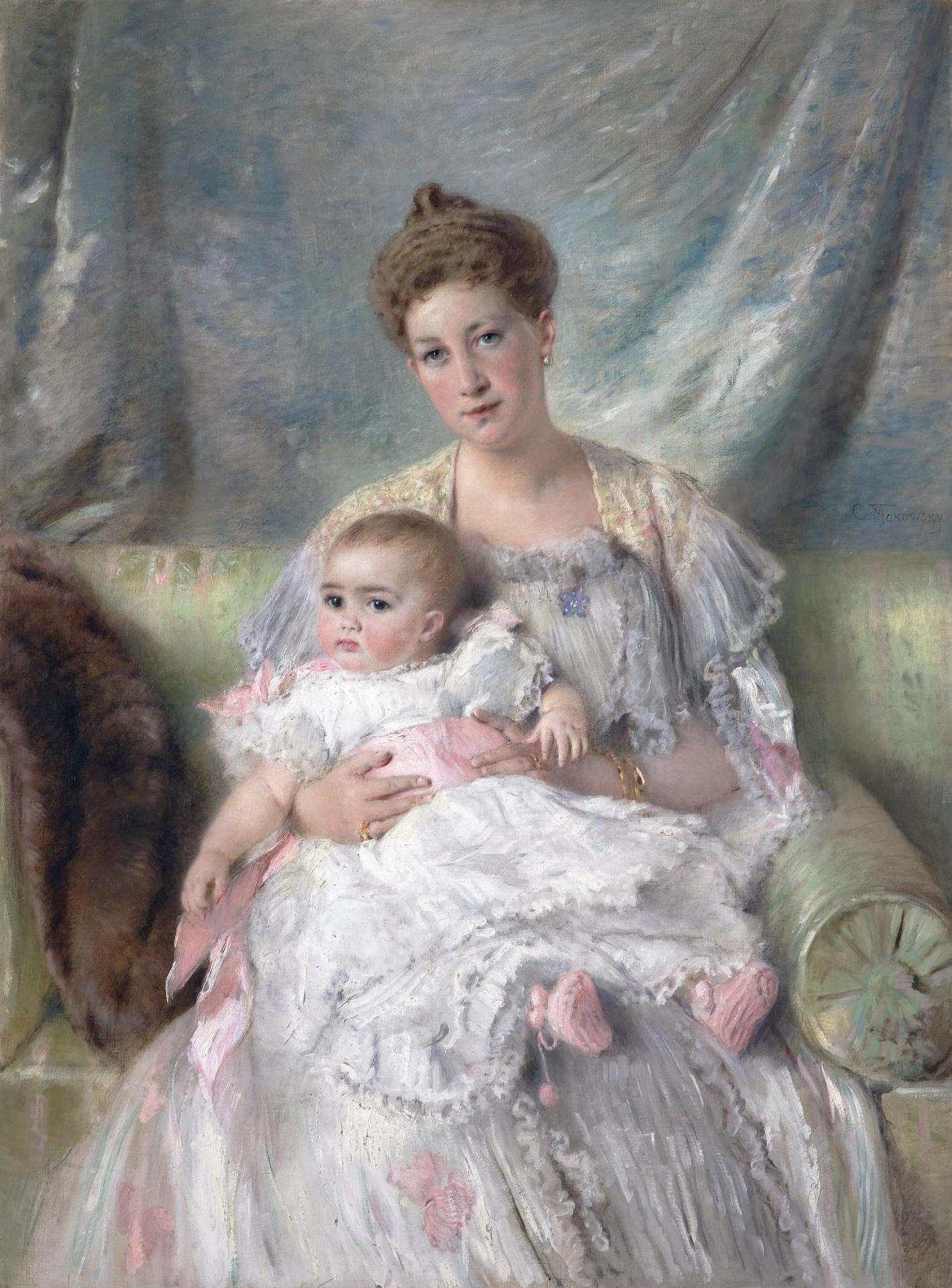
Grand Duchess Maria with her newborn daughter Princess Nina. Portrait by K. Makovskiy.

Princess Nina was born on 20 June [O.S. 7 June] 1901 in the New Mikhailovsky Palace on the Palace Embankment in Saint Petersburg, the residence of her paternal grandfather, Grand Duke Michael Nicolaievich of Russia. She was the elder daughter of Grand Duke George Mikhailovich and Grand Duchess Maria Georgievna of Russia. Through her father, she was a member of the Romanov family, and princess of the Imperial blood as a great-granddaughter of Tsar Nicholas I of Russia. Nina's mother was a princess of Greece and Denmark, and on her maternal side, Nina was a granddaughter of King George I of Greece, great-granddaughter of King Christian IX of Denmark and related to members of many European royal families.

Princess Nina spent the first years of her life in the family's apartments at the New Mikhailovsky Palace. In 1905, however, the family moved to a newly built small palace in the Crimea. Constructed in English style, they gave the property a Greek name, "Harax". For nine years the family led a quiet life. A contemporary of Tsar Nicholas II two youngest daughters, Princess Nina and her only sibling Princess Xenia, played sometimes with them, while they were in the Imperial capital.

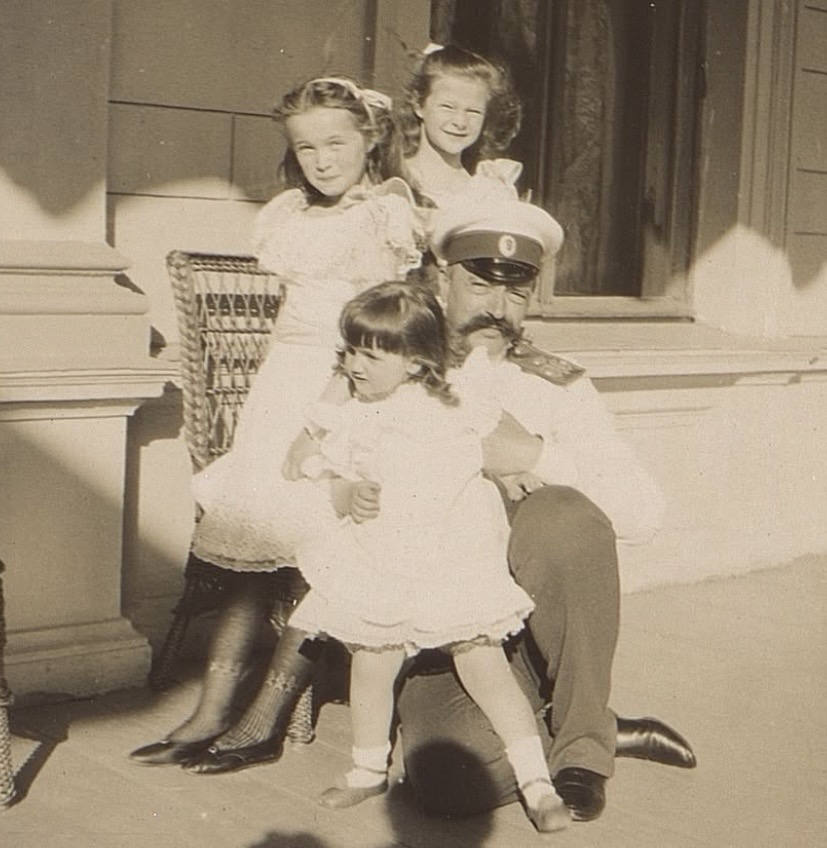
Olga Nikolaevna, Tatiana Nikolaevna, Nina Georgievna and Grand Duke George Mikhailovich. Saint Petersburg, 1905 approx.

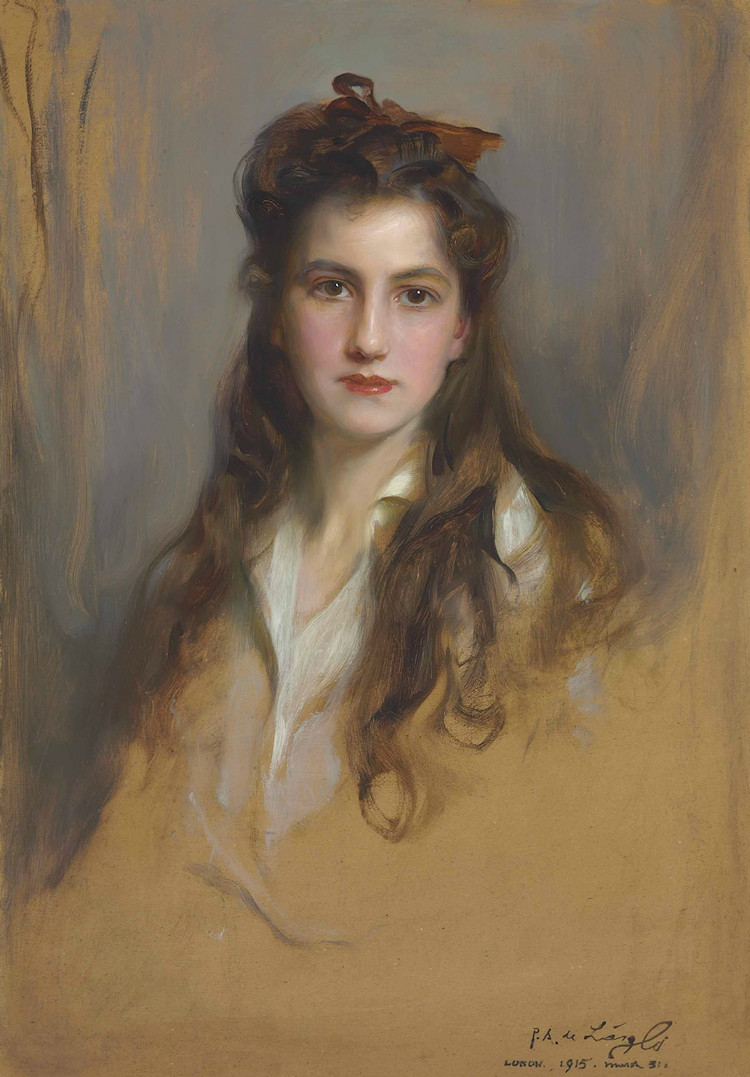
Princess Nina in 1915. Portrait by Philip de László.

The marriage of Nina's parents was unhappy. Grand Duke George was a devoted father, and the two sisters were close to him, but Grand Duchess Maria Georgievna never liked Russia and eventually became estranged from her husband. In June 1914, Maria took her two daughters to England on the pretext of improving their health; in reality, she wanted to be separated from her husband. When the war broke out a month after her arrival, the Grand Duchess did not rush back to Russia and later it was too dangerous to attempt a return. Princess Nina and her sister never saw their father again. He was imprisoned by the Bolsheviks, and later he was shot by a firing squad, along with other Romanov relatives in January 1919. During the turbulent years of World War I and the Russian Revolution, Princess Nina remained living safely in London with her mother and her sister. Both sisters treasured their father's memory and resented their mother. In part to escape her control they both married very young.

== Marriage ==
Princess Nina married Prince Paul Alexandrovich Chavchavadze (1899–1971) on 3 September 1922 in London. Paul descended from the House of Chavchavadze of the Kakheti province in Georgia, and also, in a direct line, from the last King of Georgia, George XII. They had first met as children when he was nine and she was seven, at a party at the British embassy in Rome in 1908. When they next met, it was in London many years later. By the time they were married, the world they knew had changed radically, with the collapse of the feudal system in Russia, the rise of the Bolsheviks, and annexation of Georgia by the Soviet Union. Most of their aristocratic riches were lost in the revolution, but they never complained about their material losses. Prince Paul, who also lost his father at the hands of the Bolsheviks, served in the military service on two continents. The couple had an only child, Prince David Chavchavadze, born in 1924 in London.

In 1927, Princess Nina moved with her family to the United States, where they settled in New York. In 1939 they moved to Wellfleet, Massachusetts. Princess Nina was an artist, her husband worked as an author; he wrote five books and translated several others. Their son, Prince David Chavchavadze, thanks in part to his knowledge of Russian, eventually became a CIA officer. After his retirement, he wrote a book about the Grand Dukes of Russia. Princess Nina's husband died in 1971, she outlived him for only a couple of years. She died near Hyannis, Massachusetts in 1974, aged 72. Her son left descendants.

== Honours ==
- (Russian Empire) House of Romanov: Dame of the Imperial Order of Saint Catherine

== Ancestry ==
Ancestors of Princess Nina Georgievna of Russia

8. Nicholas I of Russia
4. Grand Duke Michael Nicolaevich of Russia
9. Princess Charlotte of Prussia
2. Grand Duke George Mikhailovich of Russia
10. Leopold, Grand Duke of Baden
5. Princess Cecilie of Baden
11. Princess Sophie of Sweden
1. Princess Nina Georgievna of Russia
12. Christian IX of Denmark
6. George I of Greece
13. Princess Louise of Hesse-Kassel
3. Princess Maria of Greece and Denmark
14. Grand Duke Constantine Nikolaevich of Russia
7. Grand Duchess Olga Constantinovna of Russia
15. Princess Alexandra of Saxe-Altenburg
