= Garsevan Chavchavadze =

Georgian nobleman, politician and diplomat

- გარსევან ჭავჭავაძე
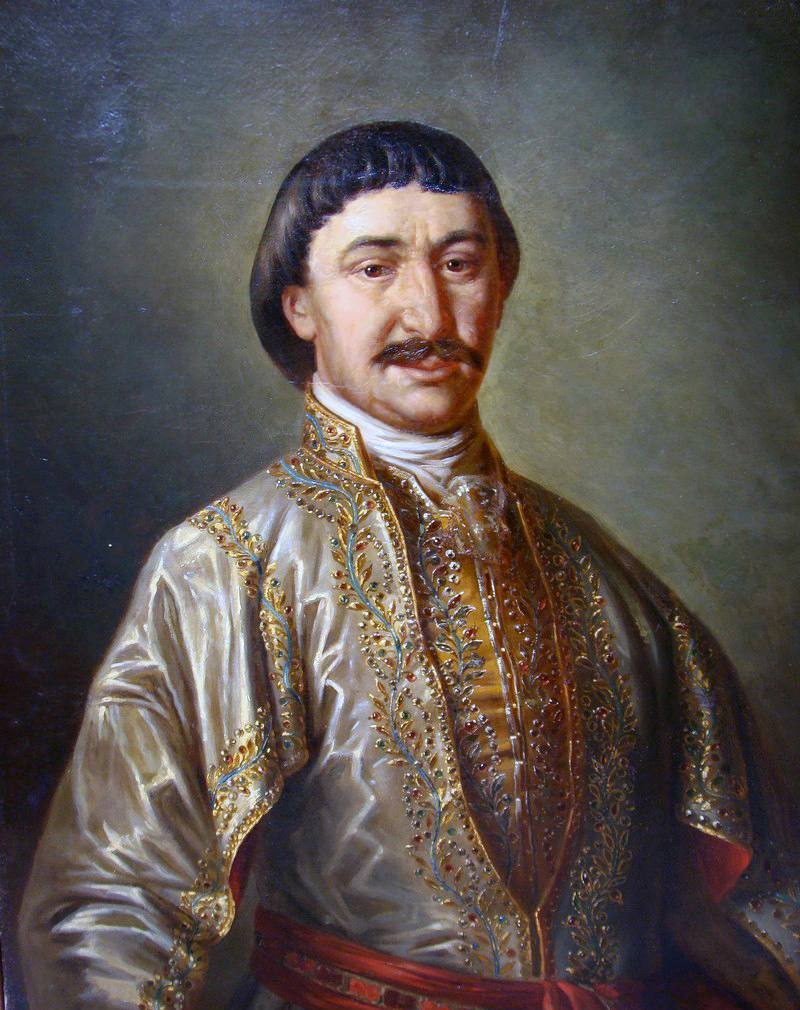
- Born: July 20, 1757; Georgia
- Died: April 7, 1811 (aged 53); Saint Petersburg, Russian Empire
- Occupation: Diplomat
- Known for: Georgian royal envoy to the Russian Empire

Prince Garsevan Chavchavadze (Georgian: გარსევან ჭავჭავაძე; July 20, 1757 - April 7, 1811) was a Georgian nobleman (tavadi), politician and diplomat primarily known as the Georgian ambassador to Imperial Russia.

He came from a noble family of the 3rd rank from the kingdom of Kakheti, eastern Georgia. For years, Chavchavadze served as adjutant-general to Heraclius II of Georgia, king of Kartli and Kakheti.

== Family and early career ==
He was involved in the negotiations that led to the 1783 Treaty of Georgievsk with Russia, placing the Georgian kingdom under the protection of Tsarina Catherine II against Persia or other powers. In 1784, Prince Chavchavadze was appointed as an ambassador to St Petersburg. He was welcomed in Russia, and Empress Catherine became a godmother at the baptism of his Petersburg-born son, Alexander, the future poet and general.

During his tenure as ambassador, Garsevan urged the Russian government to timely fulfill the promise of protection, but Georgia was left without any assistance when, in 1795, Persia attacked and devastated the country after Erekle's refusal to terminate his ties with Russia. Although many leading Georgian politicians became disillusioned in Russia, Chavchavadze still seconded the alliance with Russia, to which Georgia was bound by common faith, and supported George XII’s renewed quest for the Russian protection in 1799.

== Russian annexation and disillusionment ==
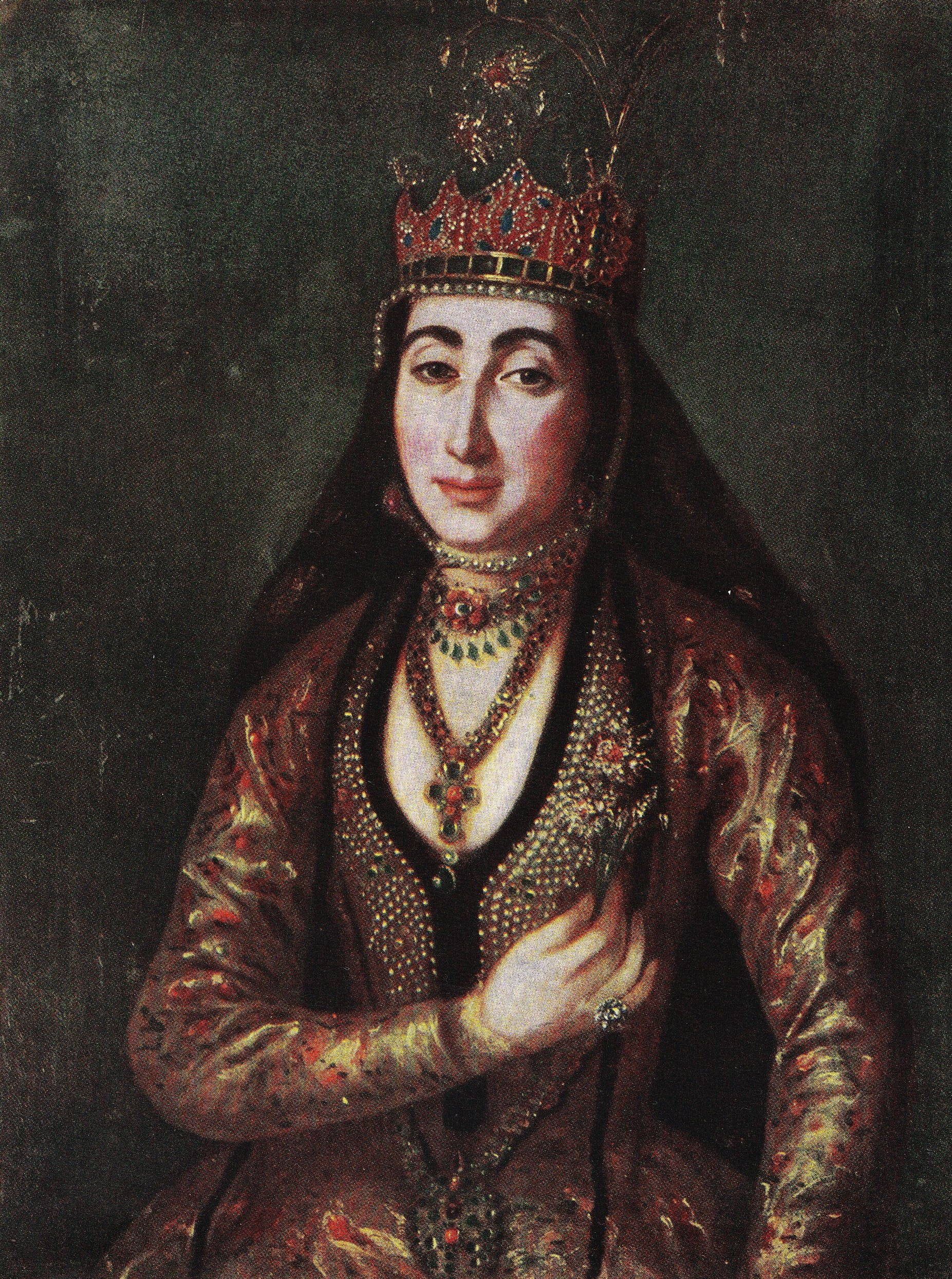
Garsevan's wife Maria

Upon the death of George XII of Georgia in 1800, Russia put in place a plan to absorb Georgia outright, officially declaring its annexation in 1801 and removing the Georgian Bagrationi dynasty from the throne. Shocked by this decision, Prince Chavchavadze wrote to his relatives in Tbilisi, that the Russians "not fulfilled [even] one of King Giorgi's requirements. They have abolished our kingdom... No country has ever been so humiliated as Georgia." In September 1801 he presented a formal note of protest against the annexation to the Russian Vice Chancellor Prince Alexander Kurakin.

Back in Georgia, he fruitlessly attempted to lobby for the preservation of a degree of internal autonomy for his native country. He remained in opposition to the Russian rule throughout the following years, prompting the new administration of Georgia to deport him to Russia in 1805. Not allowed to return to his homeland, Chavchavadze settled in St. Petersburg. He died there in 1811, and was buried at Alexander Nevsky Lavra.

== See also ==
- Georgia under the Russian Empire
- Russians in Georgia
