= Perikles Ioannidis =

Greek admiral (1881–1965)

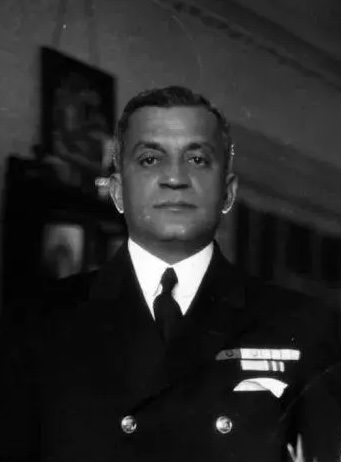
- Born: 1 November 1881
- Died: 7 February 1965 (aged 83)
- Spouse: Princess Maria of Greece and Denmark (m. 1922; died 1940)

Perikles Ioannidis (Greek: Περικλής Ιωαννίδης; 1 November 1881 – 7 February 1965) was a Greek admiral.

Ioannidis became the second husband of Princess Maria. They were married in Wiesbaden, Germany on 16 December 1922. They reputedly met when Maria travelled back to Greece from exile in 1920 on board a destroyer that Ioannidis was commanding.

On 31 March 1947, upon the annexation of the Dodecanese, he took over the administration of the islands from the British, and became their military governor until the establishment of civilian government.
