= David Chavchavadze =

American writer (1924–2014)

- His Serene Highness Prince David Chavchavadze
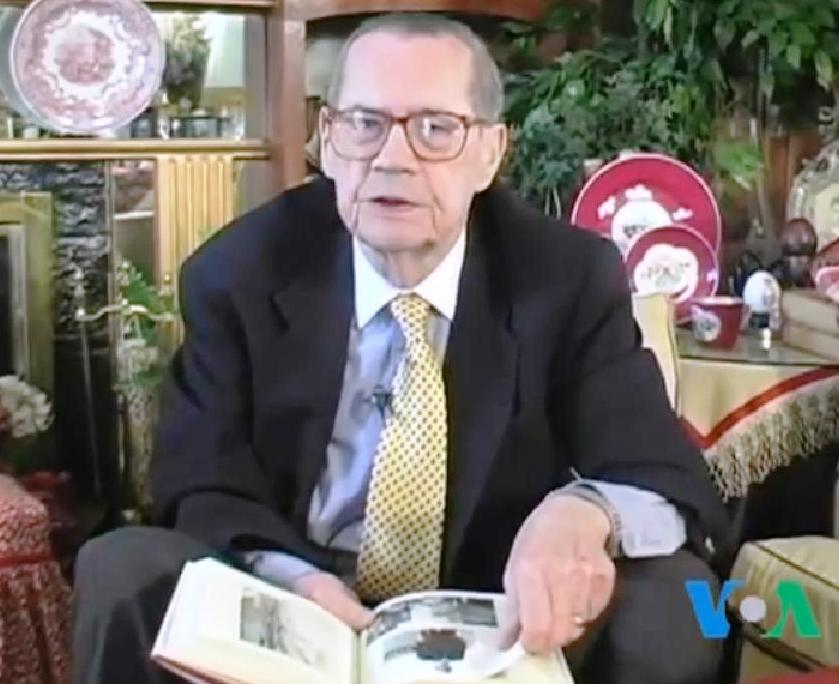
- David Chavchavadze
- Born: May 20, 1924; London, England
- Died: October 5, 2014 (aged 90); Washington, D.C., U.S.
- Spouse: Helen Husted (m. 1952; div. 1959) Judith Clippinger (m. 1959; div. 1970) Euginie de Smitt (m. 1979)
- Issue: Princess Maria Chavchavadze; Princess Alexandra Chavchavadze; Princess Catherine Chavchavadze; Prince Michael Chavchavadze
- House: Chavchavadze
- Father: Prince Paul Chavchavadze
- Mother: Princess Nina Georgievna of Russia
- Occupation: CIA Officer, author
- Military career
- Allegiance: United States
- Branch: United States Army
- Service years: 1943-1945
- Conflicts: WWII
- Espionage activity
- Country: United States
- Allegiance: United States
- Agency: Central Intelligence Agency

David Chavchavadze (May 20, 1924 – October 5, 2014) was a British-born American author and a former Central Intelligence Agency (CIA) officer of Georgian-Russian origin.

== Life and death ==
Chavchavadze was born in London to Prince Paul Chavchavadze (1899–1971) and Princess Nina Georgievna of Russia (Romanov) (1901–1974), a descendant of a prominent Georgian noble family and the Imperial Russian dynasty. His father, Prince Paul, was a fiction writer and translator of writings from Georgian into English, and an émigré in the United Kingdom, and then the United States.

Chavchavadze entered the United States Army in 1943 and served during World War II as liaison for the U.S. Army Air Force Lend-Lease supply operations to the Soviet Union. During his time in WWII, he trained at Camp Ritchie putting him among the ranks of many Ritchie Boys. After the war, he entered Yale University where he was a member of The Society of Orpheus and Bacchus, the second longest running a cappella group in the United States. He spent more than two decades of his career as a CIA officer in the Soviet Union Division.

After his retirement, Chavchavadze specialized in tracing the nobility of Imperial Russia and authored The Grand Dukes (1989). He also published Crowns and Trenchcoats: A Russian Prince in the CIA (1989) based on his CIA experiences, and translated from Russian Stronger Than Power: A Collection of Stories by Sandji B. Balykov, an emigre Kalmyk writer. Additionally, he lectured part-time at Georgetown, The George Washington and George Mason Universities on Russian history and culture.

As a grandchild of a Russian Grand Duke, he was an Associate Member of the Romanov Family Association. Via his mother, Chavchavadze is great-great-grandson (through Grand Duke Mikhail Nicholaevich) and simultaneously great-great-great-grandson (through Queen of Greece, Olga Constantinovna) of Nicholas I. He is also a second cousin to King Charles III of the United Kingdom via his mother as well.

David Chavchavadze died in his sleep on October 5, 2014, aged 90, after a long illness.

=== Marriages and children ===
He married Helen Husted on September 13, 1952, and they were divorced in 1959. They have two daughters and three grandchildren:

- Princess Maria Chavchavadze (August 28, 1953) married Alexander Rasic on October 27, 1990, and they were divorced. They have one daughter:
  - Yelena Rasic (December 16, 1990)
- Princess Alexandra Chavchavadze (December 24, 1954) married Puthukuty Krishnan Ramani on November 26, 1988. They have two children:
  - Alexander Chavchavadze Ramani-Poduval (May 18, 1991)
  - Caroline Chavchavadze Ramani-Poduval (June 6, 1994)

He remarried Judith Clippinger on December 28, 1959, and they were divorced in 1970. They have two children and three grandchildren:

- Princess Catherine Chavchavadze (December 29, 1960) married John Alan Redpath on September 22, 1990. They have two daughters:
  - Sophia Redpath (July 4, 1996)
  - Nina Nolan Redpath (October 13, 1998)
- Prince Michael Chavchavadze (August 1, 1966) married Colleen Quinn in 2011. They have one son:
  - Prince David Chavchavadze (born 2016)

He remarried, again, this time to Euginie de Smitt in 1979. They have one step-son, Paul George Olkhovsky (August 11, 1960).

== See also ==
- Chavchavadze, Georgian surname
