= Olga Constantinovna of Russia =

Queen of Greece from 1867 to 1913

Olga
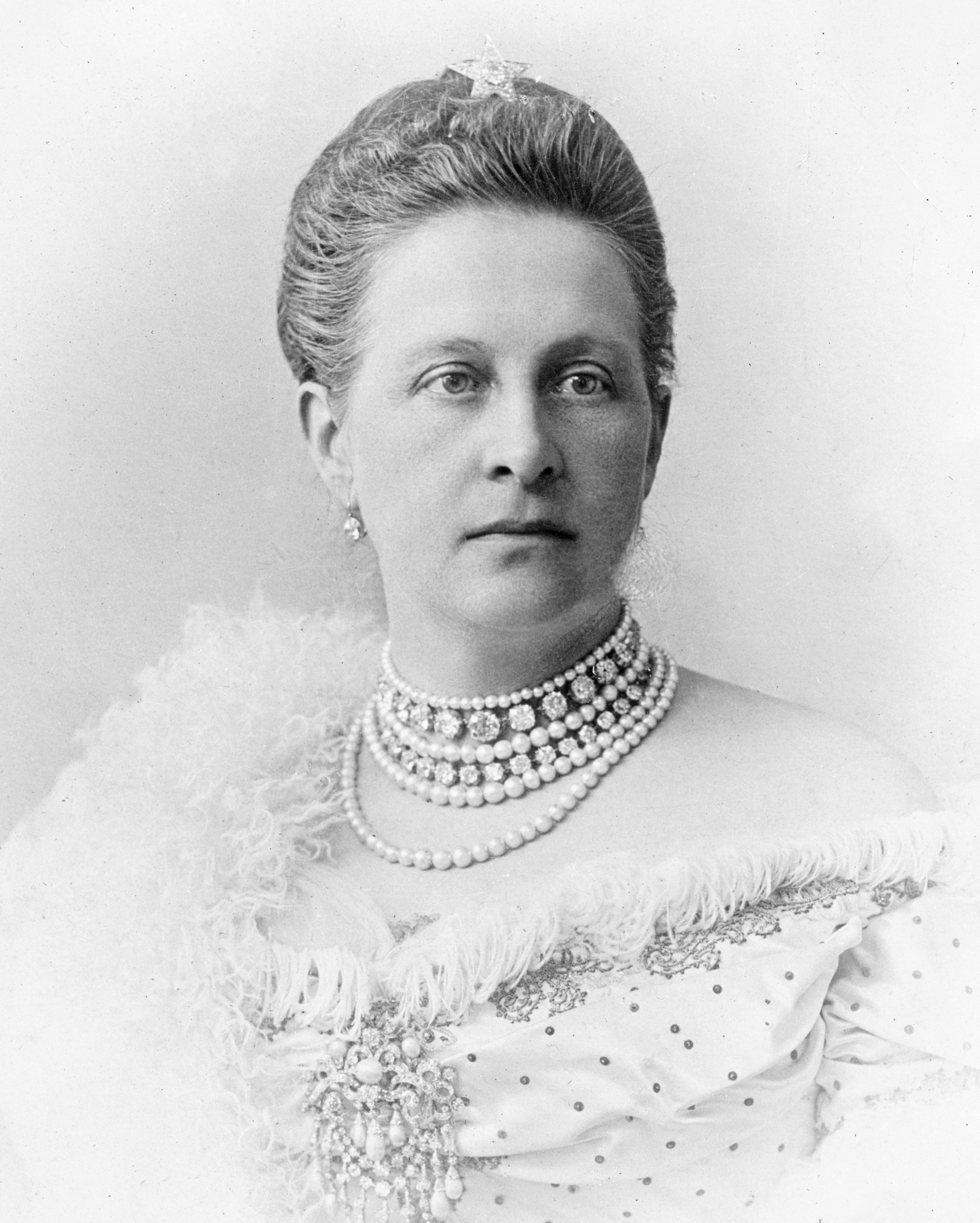

Queen consort of the Hellenes
- Tenure: 27 October 1867 – 18 March 1913

Regent of Greece
- Tenure: 17 November 1920 – 19 December 1920
- Predecessor: Pavlos Kountouriotis
- Born: 3 September 1851; Pavlovsk Palace, Saint Petersburg, Russia
- Died: 18 June 1926 (aged 74); Rome, Italy, or Pau, France
- Burial: 17 November 1936; Royal Cemetery, Tatoi Palace, Greece
- Spouse: George I of Greece (m. 1867; died 1913)
- Issue: Constantine I; Prince George; Princess Alexandra; Prince Nicholas; Princess Maria; Princess Olga; Prince Andrew; Prince Christopher
- House: Holstein-Gottorp-Romanov
- Father: Grand Duke Constantine Nikolaevich of Russia
- Mother: Princess Alexandra of Saxe-Altenburg

Olga Constantinovna of Russia (Greek: Όλγα; 3 September [O.S. 22 August] 1851 – 18 June 1926) was Queen of Greece as the wife of King George I. She was briefly the regent of Greece in 1920.

A member of the Romanov dynasty, Olga was the oldest daughter of Grand Duke Constantine Nikolaievich and his wife, Princess Alexandra of Saxe-Altenburg. She spent her childhood in the Russian Empire, primarily Saint Petersburg, Congress Poland, and the Crimea, and married George in 1867 at the age of sixteen. At first, she felt ill at ease in the Kingdom of Greece, but she quickly became involved in social and charitable work. She founded hospitals and schools, but her attempt to promote a new, more accessible, Greek translation of the Gospels sparked riots by religious conservatives.

On the assassination of her husband in 1913, Olga returned to Russia. When the First World War broke out, she set up a military hospital in Pavlovsk Palace, which belonged to her brother. She was trapped in the palace after the Russian Revolution of 1917, until the Danish embassy intervened, allowing her to escape to Switzerland. Olga could not return to Greece as her eldest son, King Constantine I, had been deposed.

In October 1920, Olga returned to Athens on the fatal illness of her grandson King Alexander of Greece. After his death, she was appointed regent (in November) until the restoration of Constantine I the following month. After the defeat of the Greeks in the Greco-Turkish War of 1919–22 the Greek royal family were again exiled and Olga spent the last years of her life in the United Kingdom, France and Italy.

== Family and early life ==
Olga was born at Pavlovsk Palace near Saint Petersburg on 3 September [O.S. 22 August] 1851. She was the second child and elder daughter of Grand Duke Constantine Nikolaievich and his wife, Grand Duchess Alexandra, a former princess of Saxe-Altenburg. Through her father, Olga was a granddaughter of Tsar Nicholas I, a niece of Tsar Alexander II and first cousin of Tsar Alexander III.

Olga's childhood was spent at her father's homes, including Pavlovsk Palace and estates in the Crimea. Her father was a younger brother of Alexander II, and her mother was considered one of the most intelligent and elegant women of the court. In 1862, Grand Duke Constantine Nikolaievich was appointed viceroy of Russian Poland by his brother and moved to Warsaw with his wife and children. The stay in Poland proved difficult for Constantine, who was the victim of a nationalist assassination attempt on 3 July 1862. Although Constantine embarked on a program of liberalization and re-instated Polish as an official language, Polish nationalists continued to agitate for reform and Olga's mother returned to Saint Petersburg with the children in 1863. Olga's difficult experiences in Poland marked her profoundly.

== Engagement and marriage ==
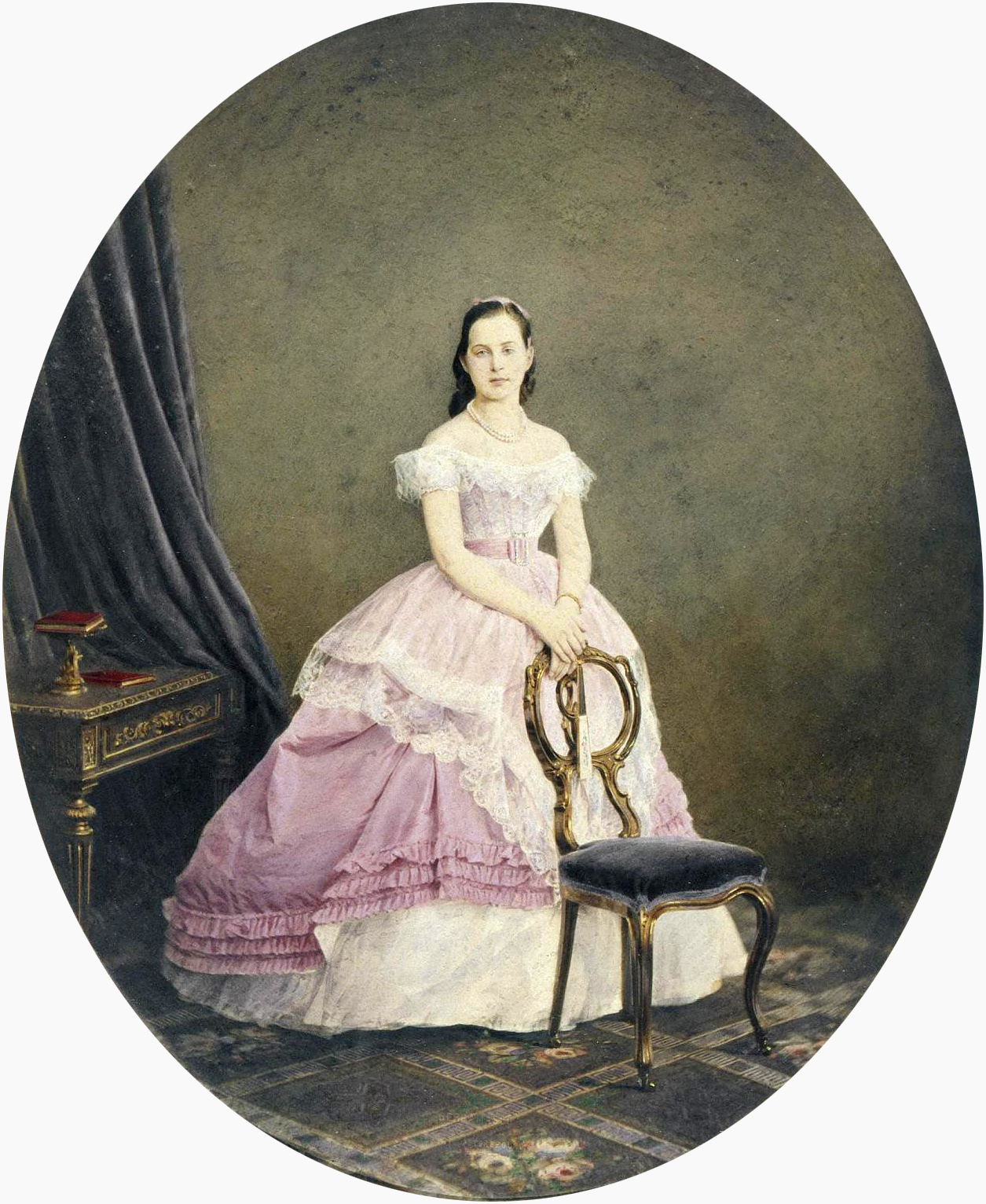
Grand Duchess Olga Constantinovna, 1867

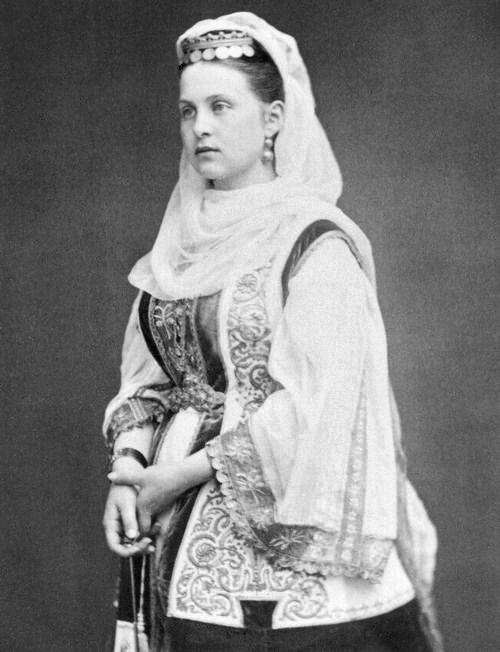
Queen Olga of Greece in a traditional Greek costume, c. 1874

The young King George I of Greece visited Russia in 1863 to thank Olga's uncle Tsar Alexander II for his support during George's election to the throne of Greece. Whilst there, George met the then twelve-year-old Olga for the first time.

George visited Russia again in 1867 to meet with his sister Dagmar, who had married Tsarevitch Alexander (later Alexander III) the year before. He was determined to find a wife and the idea of an alliance with a Russian grand duchess, born into the Eastern Orthodox Church, appealed to him. Her father was initially reluctant to agree to their marriage, thinking that at the age of fifteen she was too young and, being close to his daughter, concerned by the distance between Greece and Russia. For her part, Grand Duchess Alexandra was much more enthusiastic than her husband and, when some members of the imperial family noted the extreme youth of her daughter, she replied that Olga would not always be as young. Eventually, it was decided that Olga and George would marry when she had reached her sixteenth birthday. Meanwhile, she would continue her schoolwork until her wedding day.

Olga and George married at the chapel of the Winter Palace in Saint Petersburg on 27 October [O.S. 15 October] 1867. After five days of festivities, they spent a brief honeymoon at Ropsha, south-west of Saint Petersburg. Over the following twenty years, they had eight children:

- Constantine (2 August 1868 – 11 January 1923), who was born ten months after the marriage of his parents; he married Princess Sophia of Prussia and succeeded his father as king;
- George (24 June 1869 – 25 November 1957), High Commissioner of Crete from 1898 to 1906, married Princess Marie Bonaparte;
- Alexandra (30 August 1870 – 24 September 1891), married Grand Duke Paul Alexandrovich of Russia; their children included Grand Duke Dmitri Pavlovich of Russia, one of the assassins of Grigori Rasputin;
- Nicholas (22 January 1872 – 8 February 1938), married Grand Duchess Elena Vladimirovna of Russia;
- Marie (3 March 1876 – 14 December 1940), married firstly Grand Duke George Mikhailovich of Russia and secondly Perikles Ioannidis;
- Olga (7 April 1880 – 2 November 1880);
- Andrew (2 February 1882 – 3 December 1944), he married Princess Alice of Battenberg, their children included Prince Philip, Duke of Edinburgh; and
- Christopher (10 August 1888 – 21 January 1940), father of Prince Michael of Greece.

The Tsar told Olga "to love her new country twice more than her own", but she was ill-prepared for her new life. Aware of her youth, she chose to retain the services of her governess to continue her education. On arrival at Piraeus, Olga wore blue and white, the national colors of Greece, to the delight of the crowd. On the way to the capital, popular unrest was such that Olga, who was not accustomed to such demonstrations, was close to tears. Unable to speak Greek, and with little time for rest, she attended official functions over several days. Overwhelmed, Olga was found sobbing under a staircase cuddling her teddy bear a few days after her arrival in the kingdom while she was expected for a formal event. In less than a year, she learnt Greek and English. On the advice of her mother, she took an interest in the archeology and history of Greece to gain public support.

=== Dowry and wealth ===
Upon her marriage Olga received the customary 1,000,000 rouble dowry granted to all grand duchesses of the Russian imperial family. The capital was held in Russia, with the interest paid to Olga at a rate of 5% annually. Olga's status as a member of a foreign royal family resulted in more generous financial provision being made for her by the provisional government of Russia following the overthrow of the monarchy during the Russian Revolution; her 1,000,000 dowry capital was transferred to the Greek government on 3 April 1917.

== Private life ==
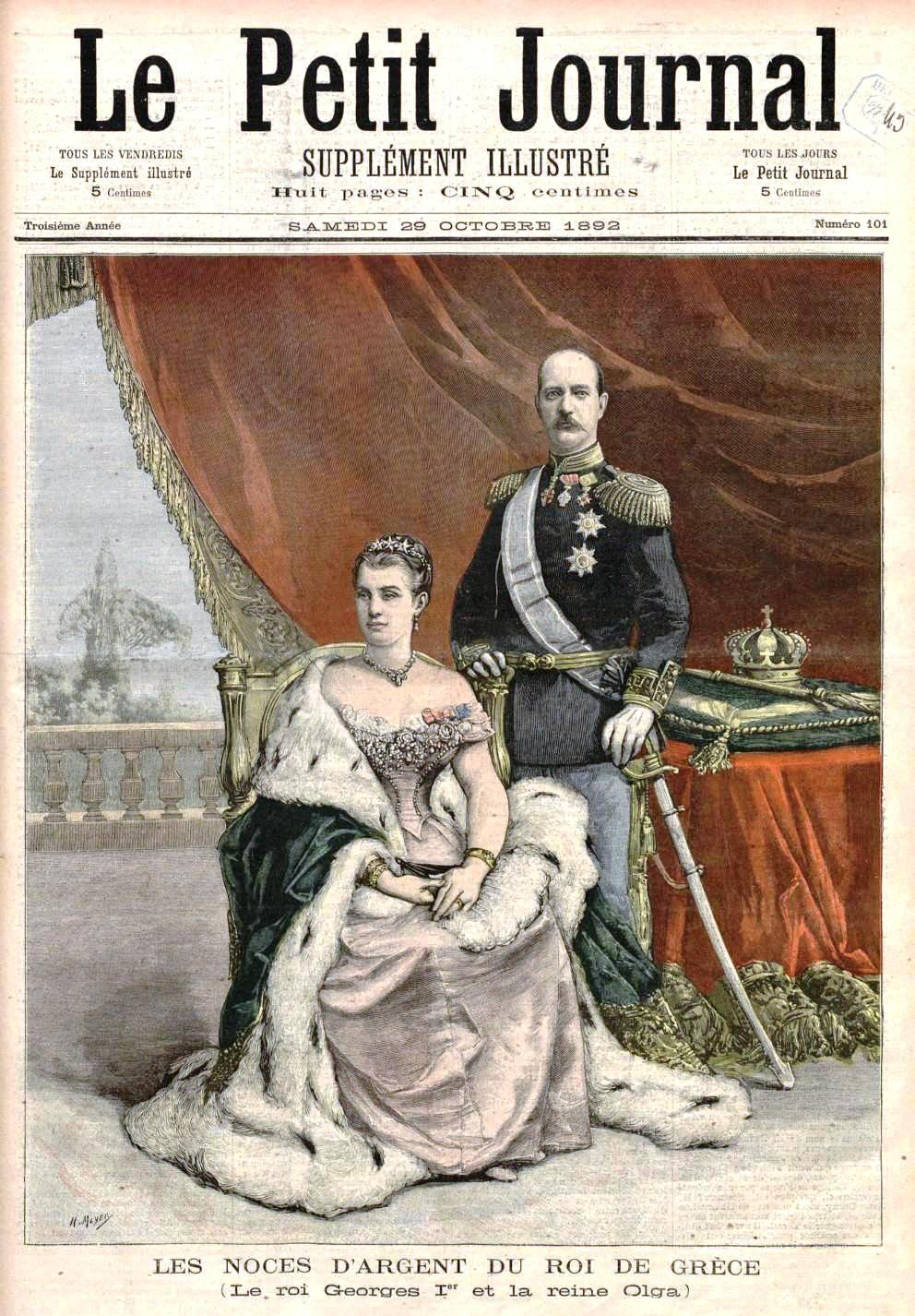
Edition of Le Petit Journal celebrating the silver wedding anniversary of King George I and Queen Olga, 1892

Throughout their marriage, George I and Olga were a close-knit couple, and contrary to the prevailing custom in the aristocracy, spent much time with their children, who grew up in a warm family atmosphere. With age, however, George I argued with his sons and Olga lamented the quarrels that divided the family periodically. In private, Olga and George conversed in German, because it was the only language they both spoke at the time of their marriage. With their children, they spoke mainly English, although the children were required to speak Greek among themselves, and Prince Andrew refused to speak anything but Greek to his parents.

The life of the royal family was relatively quiet and withdrawn. The Athenian court was not as brilliant and sumptuous as that of Saint Petersburg, and days in the Greek capital were sometimes monotonous for members of the royal family. In spring and winter, they divided time between the Royal Palace in Athens and Tatoi Palace at the foot of Mount Parnitha. Summers were spent on vacation at Aix-les-Bains in France, visiting relatives in the Russian capital or at Fredensborg and Bernstorff in Denmark, and relaxing at Mon Repos, Corfu.

Olga remained nostalgic for Russia. Her room was filled with icons from her homeland and, in the palace chapel, she sang Slavic hymns with her children. She often visited Russian ships that were docked at Piraeus and invited the Russian sailors to the royal palace. She was the only woman at the time to be an admiral, having been appointed to the rank in the Imperial Russian Navy by Tsar Alexander III. She was honored in the Greek navy by having a ship named after her. She regularly returned to Pavlovsk, travelling on the Greek royal yacht Amphitrite from Piraeus to Odessa, and from there by rail to Saint Petersburg aboard the imperial train.

== Social work ==
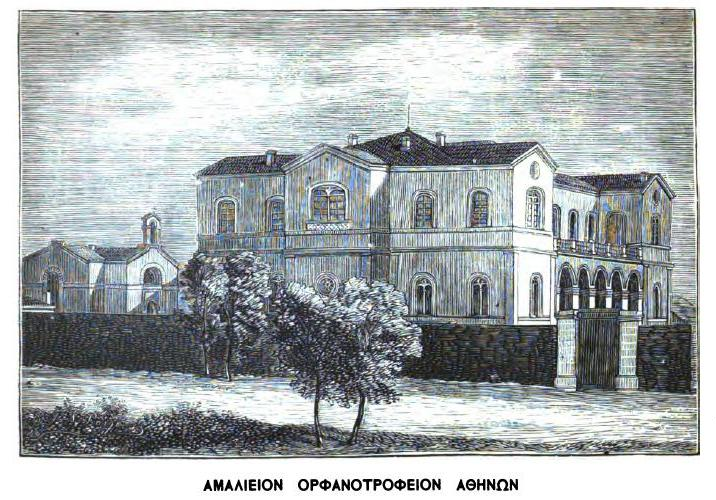
Amalieion orphanage, Athens

Olga was genuinely popular and was extensively involved in charity work. On arrival in Athens, her immediate patronages included the Amalieion orphanage founded by the previous queen consort Amalia of Oldenburg, and the Arsakeion school for girls located on University Boulevard. With her personal support and the support of wealthy donors, she built asylums for the terminally ill and for the elderly disabled, and a sanatorium for patients with consumption. She founded a society to help the poor, a kindergarten for the children of the poor, and a soup kitchen in Piraeus that doubled as a cooking school for poor girls that was later expanded into a weaving school for girls and elderly women in financial difficulty. She was patron of two military hospitals and endowed the Evangelismos (Annunciation) Hospital, Greece's largest, in downtown Athens. She built the Russian Hospital in Piraeus in memory of her daughter, Alexandra, who died in Moscow in 1891. Although aimed primarily at Russian sailors, the hospital was open to all seamen visiting Greece, with consultation fees set at the low rate of thirty lepta and medicines being free. Olga also supported the establishment and funding of hospitals during the conflicts between Greece and its neighbors, including the Greco-Turkish War of 1897 and the First Balkan War (1912–13). For their work for the wounded, Olga and her daughter-in-law Crown Princess Sophia were awarded the Royal Red Cross by Queen Victoria of the United Kingdom in December 1897.

Before Olga's arrival in Greece, there were no separate prisons for women or the young, and she was instrumental in the establishment of a women's prison in the capital and, with the support of wealthy philanthropist George Averoff, one for juvenile delinquents.

Shortly after Greece's defeat in the Greco-Turkish War of 1897, shots were fired at Olga's husband and daughter by disgruntled Greeks in 1898. Despite the failed assassination, Olga insisted on continuing her engagements without a military guard. Her son Nicolas wrote in his memoirs that one day he spoke of the importance of public opinion to his mother, and she retorted, "I prefer to be governed by a well born lion rather than four hundred rats like me." Olga's interest in political and public opinion was limited. Although she favored Greece's Russian party, she had no political influence over her husband and did not seek political influence in the Greek parliament.

== Evangelika controversy ==
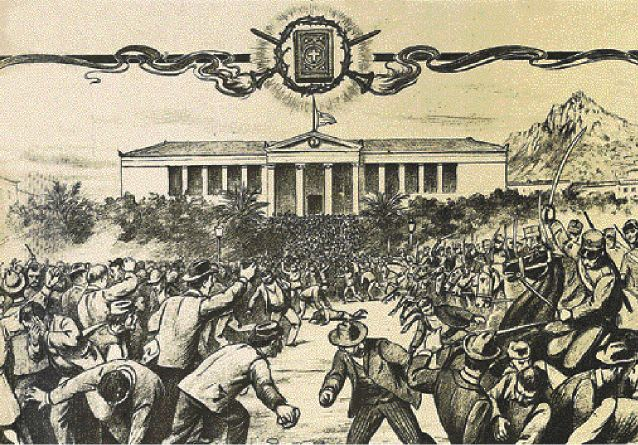
Evangelika riots in Athens, 1901

An Orthodox Christian from birth, Queen Olga became aware, during visits to wounded servicemen in the Greco-Turkish War (1897), that many were unable to read the Bible. The version used by the Church of Greece included the Septuagint version of the Old Testament and the original Greek-language version of the New Testament. Both were written in ancient Koine Greek, but her contemporaries used either Katharevousa or the so-called Demotic version of Modern Greek. Katharevousa was a formal language that contained archaized forms of modern words, was purged of "non-Greek" vocabulary from other European languages and Turkish, and had a (simplified) archaic grammar. Modern or Demotic Greek was the version commonly spoken. Olga decided to have the Bible translated into a version that could be understood by most contemporary Greeks rather than only those educated in Koine Greek. Opponents of the translation, however, considered it "tantamount to a renunciation of Greece's 'sacred heritage'".

In February 1901, the translation of the New Testament from Koine into Modern Greek that she had sponsored was published without the authorization of the Greek Holy Synod. The price was set at one drachma, far below its actual cost, and the edition sold well. To mitigate opposition to the translation, both the old and new texts were included and the frontispiece specifically stated it was for "exclusive family use" rather than in church.

At the same time, another translation was completed by Alexandros Pallis, a major supporter of a literary movement supporting the use of Demotic in written language. Publication of the translation started in serial form in the newspaper Akropolis on 9 September 1901. Purist theologians and Ecumenical Patriarch Joachim III of Constantinople denounced the translation. A faction of the Greek press started accusing Pallis and his Demoticist supporters of blasphemy and treason. Riots, peaking on 8 November, were started by students of the University of Athens, partly motivated by conservative professors. They demanded the excommunication of Pallis and anyone involved with the translations, including Olga and Procopios, the Metropolitan bishop of Athens, who had supervised the translation at her personal request.

Troops were called in to maintain order, and conflict between them and the rioters resulted in eight deaths and over sixty people wounded. By December, the remaining copies of Olga's translation had been confiscated and their circulation prohibited. Anyone selling or reading the translations was threatened with excommunication. The controversy was called Evangelika, i.e. "the Gospel events" or Gospel riots, after the word Evangelion, Greek for "Gospel", and led to the resignation of the metropolitan bishop, Procopius, and the fall of the government of Georgios Theotokis.

== Widowhood ==
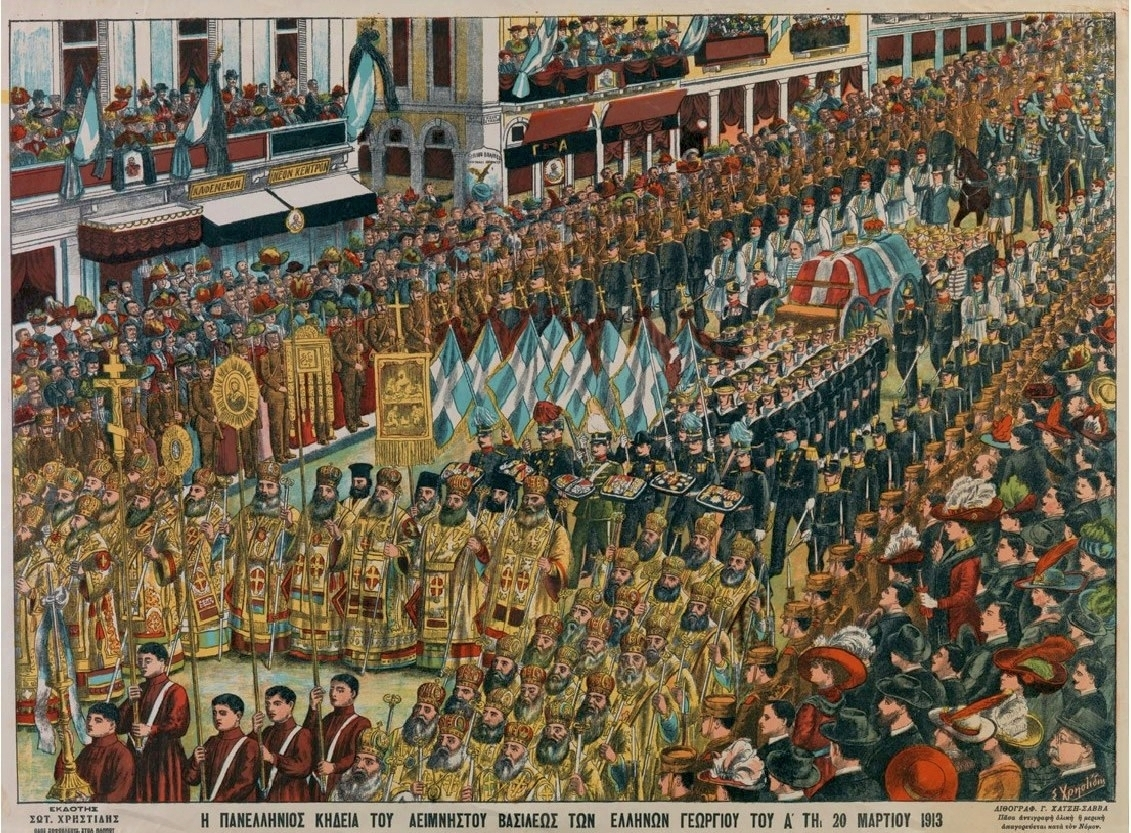
Funeral of George I, Athens, 1913

In 1913, the First Balkan War ended with the defeat of the Ottoman Empire by a coalition of Greek, Bulgarian, Serbian and Montenegrin forces. Greece was considerably enlarged at the expense of Turkey, but divisions between the victorious powers in the Balkan League soon became apparent: Athens and Sofia vied for possession of Thessaloniki and its region. To affirm Greek control of the main city of Macedonia, George I moved to the city soon after its liberation. Just as he did in Athens, he went about Thessaloniki without any meaningful protection force, and while out for an afternoon walk near the White Tower on 18 March 1913, he was shot and killed by Alexandros Schinas. Olga, who said her husband's death was "the will of God", arrived at Thessaloniki the next day. She and her family visited the scene of the assassination and accompanied the body of the king to Athens. He was buried in the royal cemetery at Tatoi Palace.

George and Olga's eldest son, Constantine, became king and his wife, Sophia of Prussia, became the new queen consort. Olga, as queen dowager, was given the use of a wing in the royal palace but soon returned to her native Russia, to spend time with her younger brother, Grand Duke Constantine Constantinovich and his family at his home, and Olga's birthplace, Pavlovsk Palace.

== World War I ==
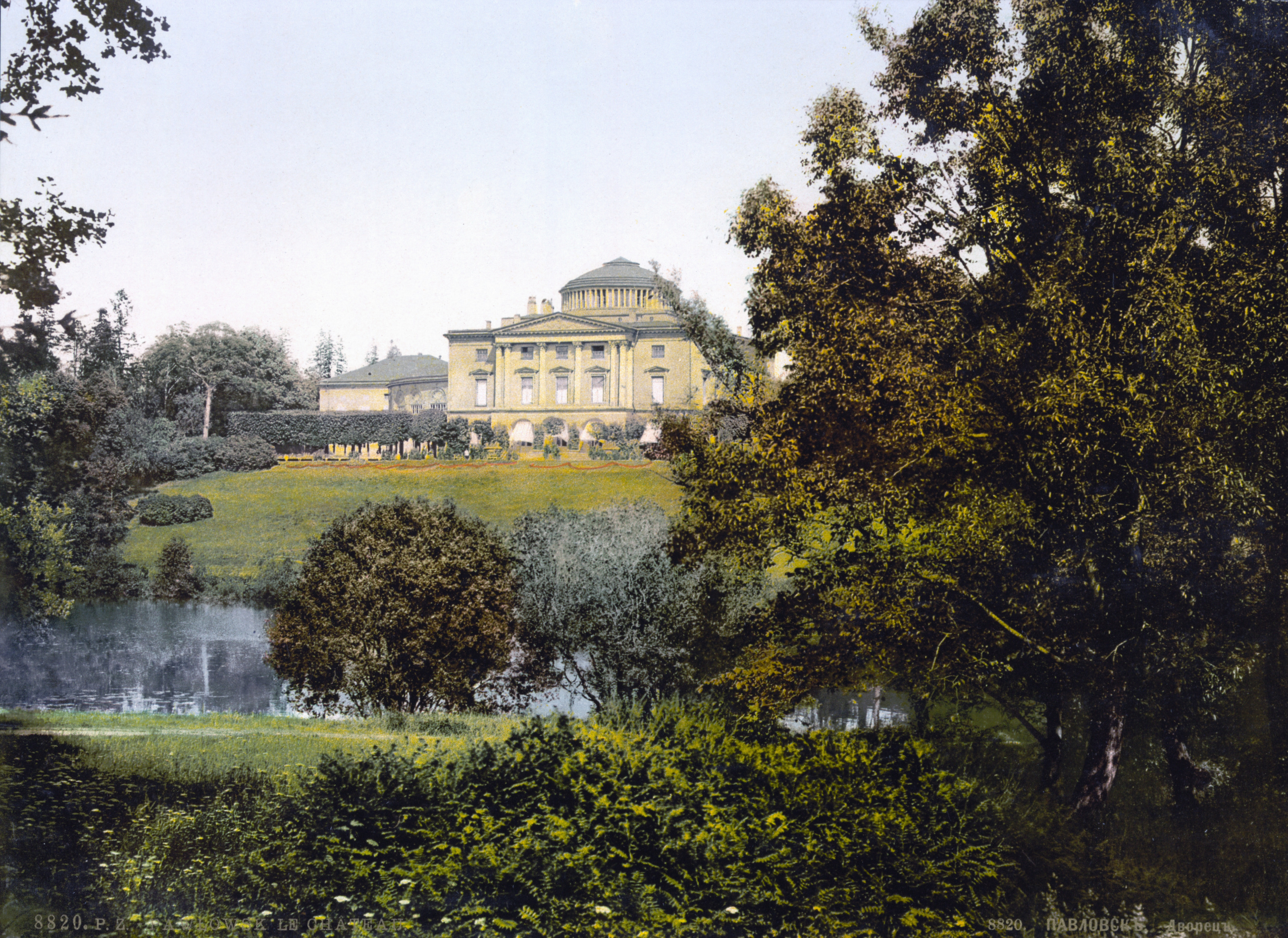
Pavlovsk Palace, near Saint Petersburg

In August 1914, Olga was in Russia at the outbreak of World War I, in which the Allied or Entente Powers including Russia, Britain and France fought against the Central Powers including Germany, Austria-Hungary and the Ottoman Empire. She decided to stay in Saint Petersburg and establish a military hospital in the Pavlovsk Palace to support the Russian war effort. Other members of the imperial family, such as Princess Helen and Olga's granddaughter Grand Duchess Maria Pavlovna founded field hospitals at the front. As the war continued, Olga became aware of the growing crisis in Russia, and attempted to warn Tsarina Alexandra in 1916 of the danger of revolution but the Russian empress refused to listen. A few weeks later, Olga attracted the fury of the Tsarina after signing a petition asking for a pardon for her grandson, Grand Duke Dmitri Pavlovich, who had been exiled to the Persian front for his involvement in the assassination of Alexandra's favorite mystic, Grigori Rasputin.

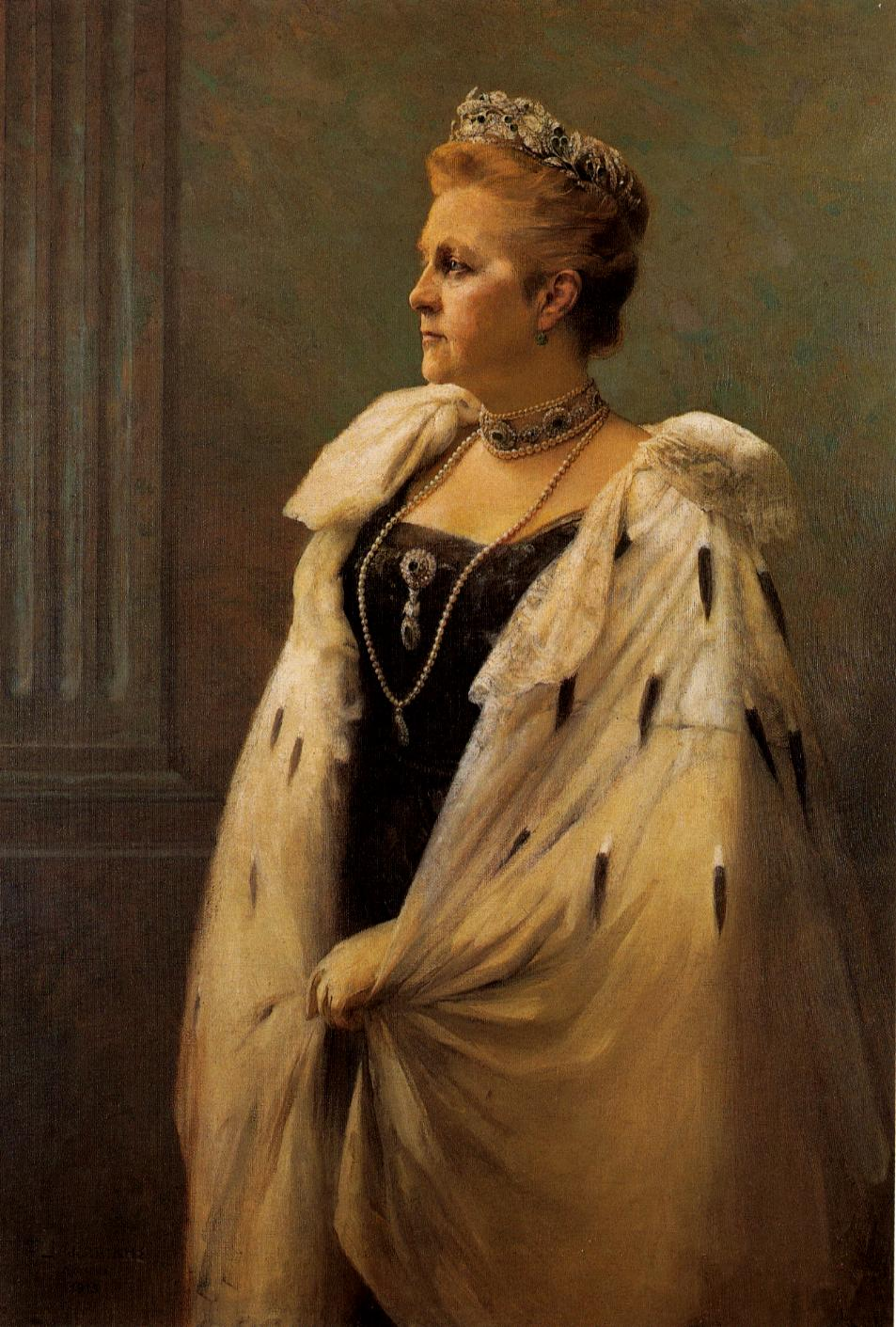
Portrait by Georgios Jakobides, 1915

In contrast to Olga, her eldest son, King Constantine I of Greece, was determined to follow a policy of neutrality. His maternal relations were Russian, and his wife was the sister of Kaiser Wilhelm II of Germany. His policy brought him into conflict with Prime Minister Eleftherios Venizelos, who favored the Allies. Constantine was soon accused of being a Germanophile and the Athenian government was regarded with suspicion in London and Paris. In what became known as the National Schism, Venizelos established a parallel government in Thessaloniki in opposition to Constantine.

On the collapse of the Tsarist rule in February 1917, Olga stayed at Pavlovsk Palace, protected by her status as a foreign sovereign, soon to be almost alone except for a single young domestic named Anna Egorova. (After the Revolution, Egorova entered the service of Prince Christopher of Greece and became the governess of his son, Michael.) Cut off from Greece with poor communications, their safety was far from assured, and Bolshevik gossip accused them of storing weapons. Olga accepted the need to leave Russia, but the Bolsheviks refused to let her go and diplomatic help from Greece was not forthcoming in the aftermath of the National Schism. In June, Constantine had been deposed and exiled to Switzerland. As the Allies did not wish to establish a Greek republic or see Crown Prince George succeed his father, Constantine was replaced on the throne by his second son, Alexander, who was thought to be more favorable to the Allies and more malleable than his older brother. Venizelos held power and the supporters of the deposed king were arrested or executed.

== First exile ==
After several months of appeals for help, the Danish legation in Russia issued Olga a passport, which she used to enter Germany on the eve of its defeat, eventually joining her eldest son and his family in Switzerland in early 1919. Other members of the Russian imperial family did not escape. Among those killed were the Tsar, Tsarina and their five children; Olga's brothers Grand Dukes Nicholas and Dmitri Constantinovich; three of her nephews Princes John, Constantine and Igor Constantinovich; and the Tsarina's sister Grand Duchess Elizabeth Feodorovna.

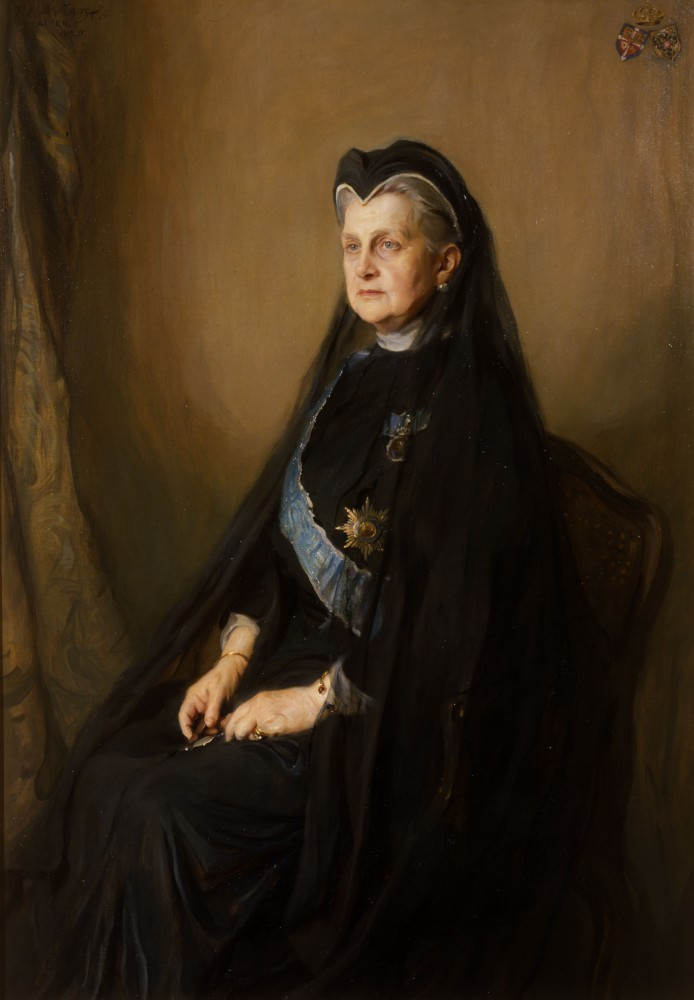
Queen Olga in old age by Philip de László

In Switzerland, Constantine I and his family found themselves isolated and without an income. The Greek government under Venizelos did not pay pensions to former rulers and prohibited any contact between the exiles and King Alexander. Already in fragile health, the former king became gradually more depressed. The Russian Revolution and the National Schism deprived Olga of her immovable property and she was forced to live a much less lavish lifestyle than in the past. She did, however, enjoy spending more time with her sons and grandchildren, from whom she had been long separated by the war.

== Regency ==
On 2 October 1920, King Alexander was bitten by a monkey during a walk through the gardens at Tatoi. The wound became infected and Alexander developed sepsis. On 19 October, he began to rave and called for his mother, but the Greek government refused to allow Queen Sophia to return to Greece. Worried about her son, and knowing that his grandmother was the only other royal still in favor with the Venizelists, Sophia asked Olga to go to Athens to care for Alexander. After several days of negotiations, the dowager queen obtained permission to return to Greece but, delayed by rough seas, she arrived twelve hours after her grandson's death on 25 October. On 29 October, Alexander was buried at Tatoi; Olga was the only member of the royal family at the funeral.

Still opposed to the return of Constantine I and Prince George, the government of Eleftherios Venizelos offered the throne to Constantine's third son, Prince Paul, who refused to ascend the throne before his father and older brother unless a referendum named him head of state. Only days after Alexander's death, however, Venizelos was defeated in a general election. On 17 November, Admiral Pavlos Kountouriotis, regent since the death of Alexander, retired and the new prime minister, Dimitrios Rallis, asked Olga to assume the regency. She served as regent for about a month until her son Constantine returned to the throne on 19 December after a referendum in his favor.

== Second exile and death ==
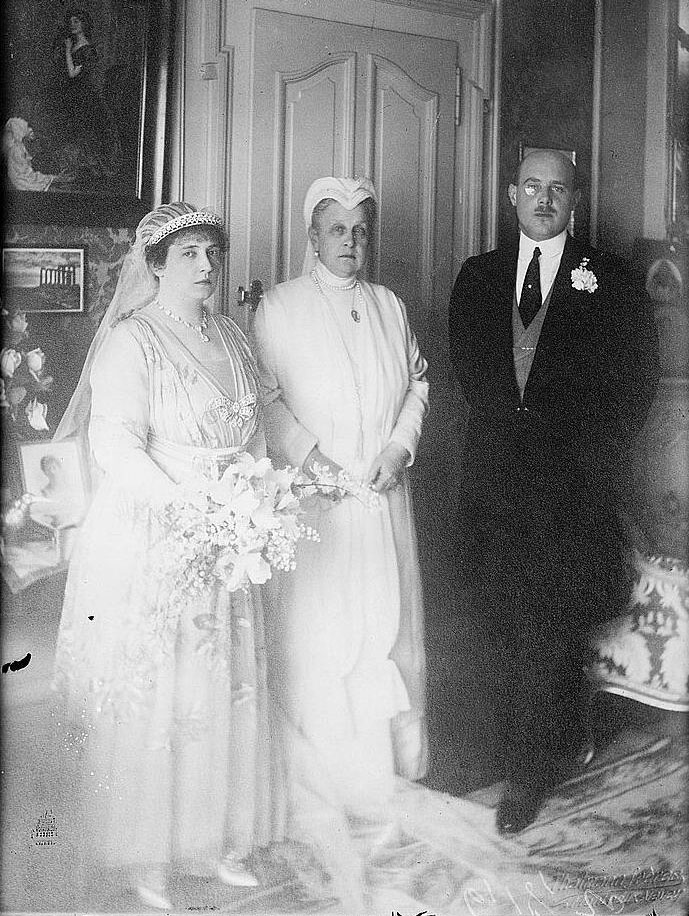
Olga (center) with her son Christopher and his first wife Princess Anastasia

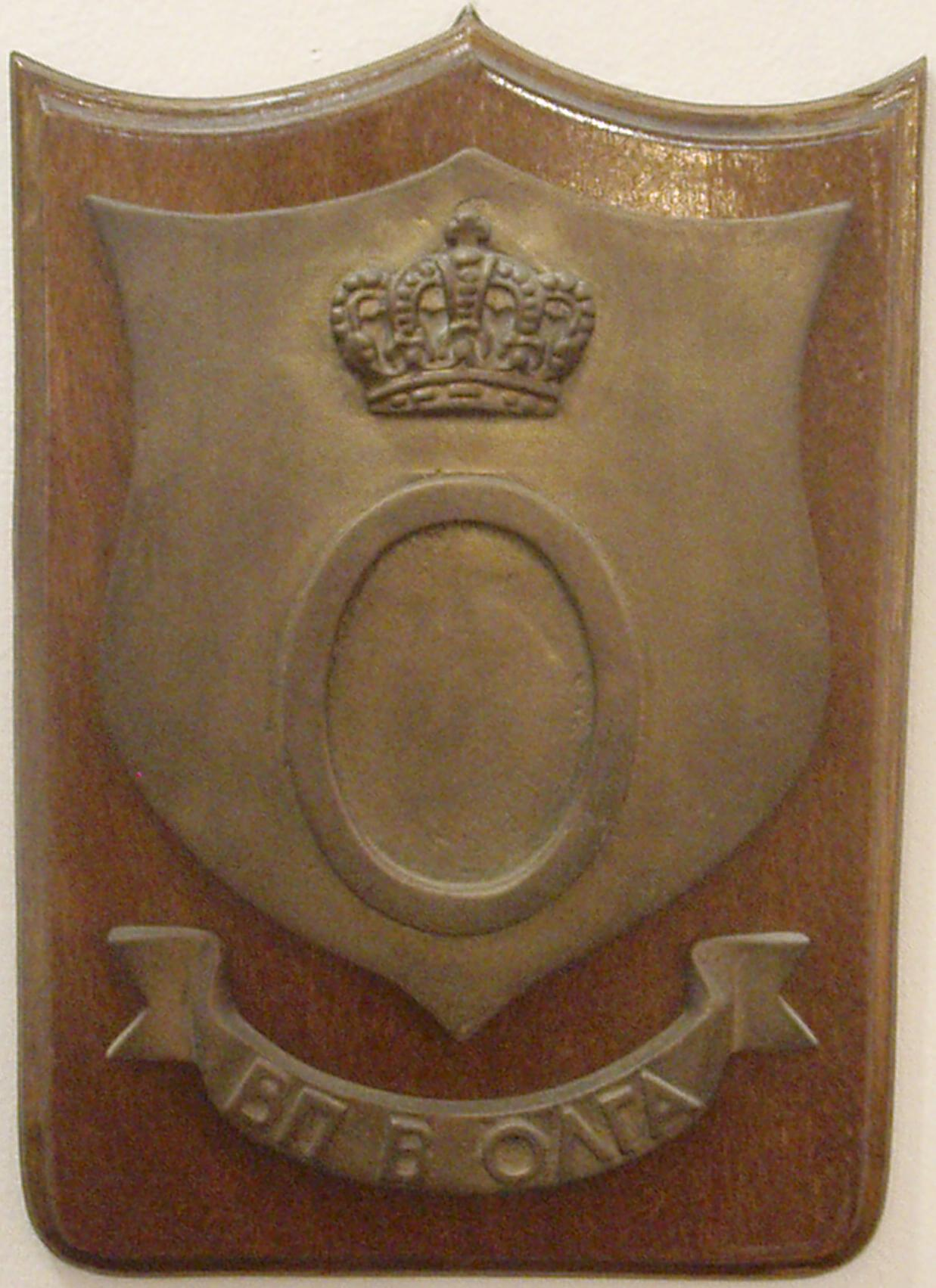
Olga's monogram used as an emblem on the World War II-era Greek destroyer Vasilissa Olga

Constantine I returned to the throne 18 months into the Greco-Turkish War, launched in May 1919. In September 1921, the Greek defeat at the battle of Sakarya marked the beginning of the Greek retreat from Anatolia. Resentment among the allies for Constantine's policy during World War I prevented Athens from receiving outside support. Mustafa Kemal Atatürk, the new leader of Turkey, regained Smyrna and Eastern Thrace, annexed by Athens at the end of World War I.

Following a coup by disgruntled military officers, Constantine I abdicated for a second time on 27 September 1922. With several other members of his family, including Queen Olga, he went into exile in Italy and his eldest son succeeded him for a few months on the throne as George II. Within months, Constantine died in Italy. One of Olga's sons, Prince Andrew, was among those arrested by the new regime. Many defendants in the treason trials that followed the coup were shot, including senior politicians and generals. Foreign diplomats assumed that Andrew was also in mortal danger, and George V of the United Kingdom, Alfonso XIII of Spain, the French president Raymond Poincaré and Pope Pius XI sent representatives to Athens to intercede on his behalf. Andrew, though spared, was banished for life and his family (including the infant Prince Philip, later Duke of Edinburgh and consort of Queen Elizabeth II) fled into exile in December 1922 aboard a British cruiser, HMS Calypso.

Unlike her children and grandchildren, Olga was given a pension by the government of the Second Hellenic Republic, but she maintained so many of the faithful old servants who had fled Greece with her that she was usually left with no more than 20 pounds sterling per month (worth about £1,000 in 2025 prices) to meet her own expenses. She could, however, count on the support of her family, scattered throughout Western Europe. In the United Kingdom, she shared her time between Spencer House, London, the residence of her youngest son, Prince Christopher; Regent's Park, where her daughter, Grand Duchess Marie, rented a mansion; Sandringham House, the home of her sister-in-law, Queen Alexandra; and Windsor Castle and Buckingham Palace, where her nephew King George V lent apartments.

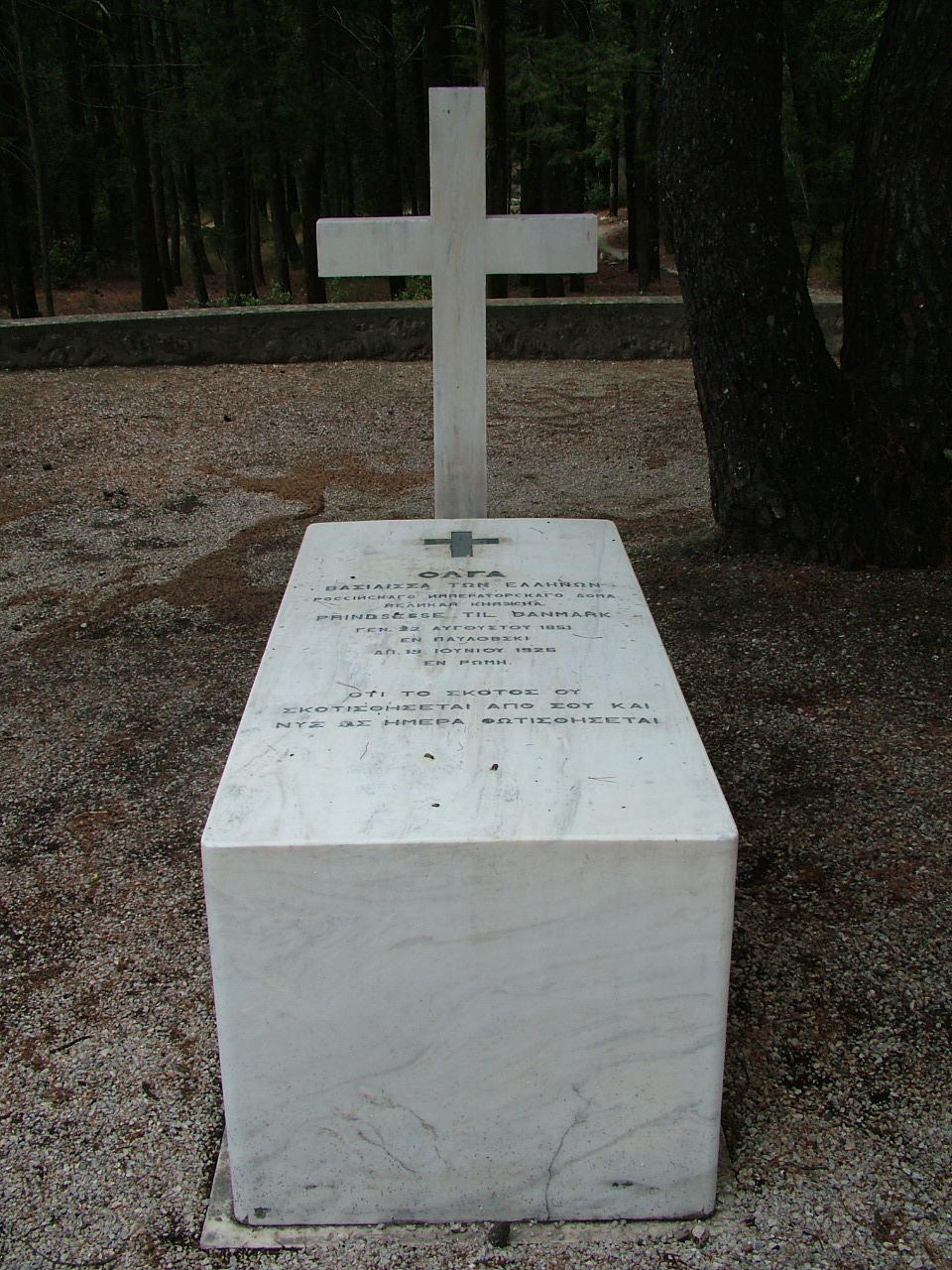
Olga's grave in Tatoi

Olga's final years were marked by ill health. Lameness restricted her to a wheelchair, and she stayed in Paris several times to undergo treatment for her eyes. Her poor eyesight caused George V much laughter when she mistook a statue of a naked Lady Godiva for one of Queen Victoria. Increasingly dependent, Olga finally settled with her youngest son, Prince Christopher, shortly after the death of his first wife, Princess Anastasia, in 1923. Olga died on 18 June 1926 either at Christopher's Villa Anastasia in Rome, or at Pau, France.

Despite republicanism in Greece, Olga was still held in high esteem and the republican government in Athens offered to pay for her funeral and repatriate her remains to Greece. Nonetheless, her children declined the offer, preferring to bury her in Italy beside her son, Constantine I, whose body Greece had refused to accept. Her funeral was held on 22 June 1926 at the Orthodox Church in Rome and the next day she was laid to rest in the crypt of the Russian Church in Florence. After the restoration of the Greek monarchy in 1935 she was re-interred at Tatoi on 17 November 1936.

As much of her property had been confiscated by the Soviet Union and the Greek republican government, most of her estate comprised jewelry reported in The Times to be worth £100,000 (equivalent to £7,000,000 in 2024). This was shared between her children and the children of Constantine I. Traumatized by the events of the Russian Revolution, Olga wished to sever all ties with the country in which her family had been massacred. Before dying, she made her grandson, King George II, swear to repatriate the body of her daughter Princess Alexandra, buried in the Peter and Paul Cathedral in Saint Petersburg. Her wish was fulfilled in 1940 after his restoration to the Greek throne.

== Ancestors ==
Ancestors of Olga Constantinovna of Russia

8. Paul I of Russia
4. Nicholas I of Russia
9. Duchess Sophie Dorothea of Württemberg
2. Grand Duke Constantine Nikolaevich of Russia
10. Frederick William III of Prussia
5. Princess Charlotte of Prussia
11. Duchess Luise of Mecklenburg-Strelitz
1. Grand Duchess Olga Constantinovna of Russia
12. Frederick, Duke of Saxe-Altenburg
6. Joseph, Duke of Saxe-Altenburg
13. Duchess Charlotte Georgine of Mecklenburg-Strelitz
3. Princess Alexandra of Saxe-Altenburg
14. Duke Louis of Württemberg
7. Duchess Amalie of Württemberg
15. Princess Henriette of Nassau-Weilburg

== Notes ==
Olga Constantinovna of Russia House of Romanov Born: 3 September 1851 Died: 18 June 1926
Greek royalty
Vacant Title last held by Amalia of Oldenburg	Queen consort of Greece; 27 October 1867 – 18 March 1913	Succeeded by Sophia of Prussia
