= Chavchavadze =

Georgian noble family

Chavchavadze ჭავჭავაძე
- Country: Georgia

The House of Chavchavadze (Georgian: ჭავჭავაძე) is a Georgian noble family, formerly a princely one (tavadi), later incorporated into the Russian nobility, also with the title of Prince.

== Etymology ==
The surname Chavchavadze is derived from the Georgian word chavchavi (ჭავჭავი), a variant of chivchavi (ჭივჭავი), the Georgian name for the Eurasian siskin. Over time, the word came to be used as a nickname for a short-statured person, eventually giving rise to the surname.

== History ==
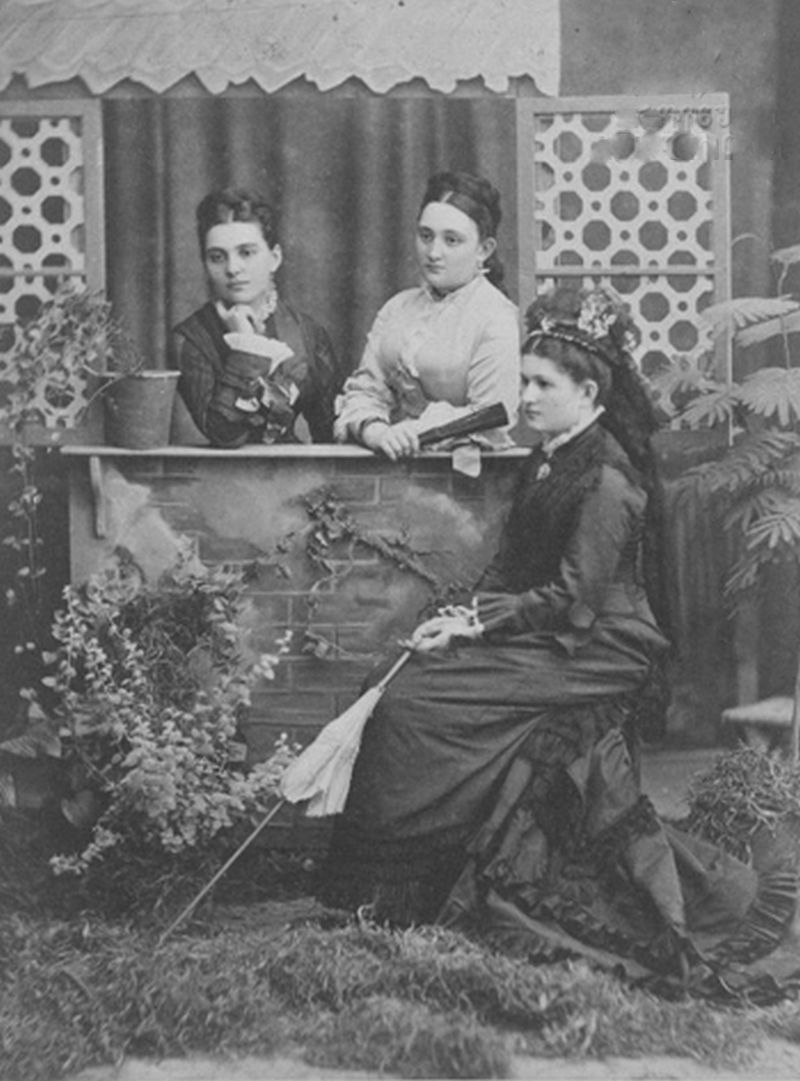
The Chavchavadze Sisters, 1870s

The family is first attested in the 15th century, during the reign of Alexander I of Georgia. By the time of Levan of Kakheti they appear in the province of Kakheti (1529, according to Prince Ioane of Georgia), where they produced two lines: one in Telavi and Tsinandali; another in Kvareli and Shilda. Both these lines were elevated to a princely dignity under the kings Heraclius I (1680s) and Constantine II (1726), respectively.

The Chavchavadze family, with its head Prince Garsevan, came to much prominence under the king Heraclius II later in the 18th century, and continued to play an important role in Georgia during the Imperial Russian rule. They were confirmed in their rank by the Tsar’s decrees of 1825, 1828, 1829, and 1850.

On 4 July 1853, a small party under Ghazi Muhammad (the son of Murid leader, Imam Shamil) kidnapped Prince Chavchavadze's wife Anna and his sister-in-law, Princess Varvara Orbeliani, together with their children and some others. The princess was exchanged for Shamil's son, Jamalu'd-din and 40,000 roubles on 10 March 1855.

The noble Chavchavadze family achieved its greatest prominence through Prince Ilia Chavchavadze, a seminal Georgian author and intellectual who spearheaded the nation's 19th-century cultural revival.

== Notable members ==
- Garsevan Chavchavadze, Georgian politician and diplomat
- Alexander Chavchavadze, Georgian writer and military officer
- Nino Chavchavadze, Georgian noblewoman
- Ilia Chavchavadze, Georgian poet and Father of the Nation
- David Chavchavadze, American writer
- Princess Nina Georgievna of Russia, Russian princess

== Bibliography ==
- Chikovani, Iuri (2002). Tavadi Chavchavadzes (in Georgian). Tbilisi: Artanuji. p. 5.
- Baddeley, John F. (1967). The Russian Conquest of the Caucasus. Georgetown University Press. p. 270.
