= Vladimir Galitzine =

Russian-born English emigrant supporter (1884–1954)

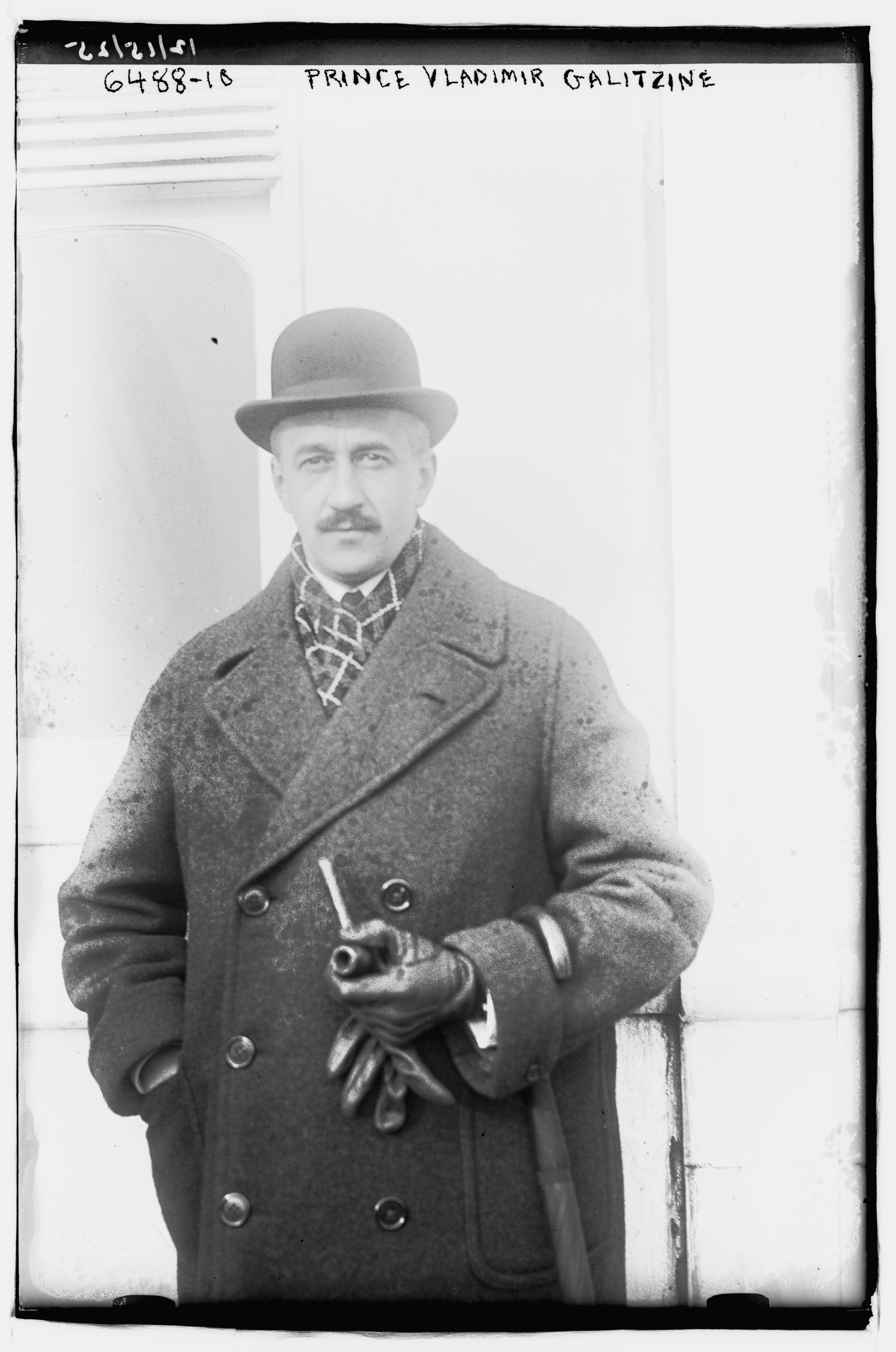
Prince Vladimir Galitzine

Prince Vladimir Emanuelovich Galitzine (17 June 1884 – 13 July 1954) was a Russian émigré who lived in England. He was the Chairman of the Russian Society of Support to Russian Emigrants in England.

== Early life ==
Galitzine was born on 17 June 1884 in St. Petersburg, Russia. He was one of four children born of Prince Emanuel Vasilievich Galitzine (1834–1892) and, his second wife, Ekaterina Nikolaevna Gordeeva. His father served in the Life Guards Horse-Grenadier Regiment. Vladimir and his elder brother, Nikolai, became orphans at a very early age and were brought up by their maternal uncle, Nikolai Gordeev and Valentina Sergeevna (née Ushakova) as they had no children of their own. Gordeev served as vice-governor of Riazan, governor of the Polish town of Płock, and governor of Kursk from 1903 until his death in 1906. After Gordeev's death, Valentina Sergeevna went to the Marfo-Mariinsky Convent (founded by Grand Duchess Elizabeth Feodorovna) and gave the Yakshino estate in Tula to Prince Nikolai and Prince Vladimir.

His paternal grandparents were Prince Vasili Sergeevich Galitzine, aide-de-camp to Emperor Alexander I (and a son of Prince Segei Ivanovich Galitzine), and Countess Adelaïda Pavlovna Stroganova (a daughter of Count Pavel Alexandrovich Stroganov and Sophie Stroganova (née Princess Golitysn) and granddaughter of Prince Vladimir Borisovich Golitsyn and Natalya Golitsyna (née Countess Chernyshyova), who was the inspiration for The Queen of Spades by Alexander Pushkin). In 1845, his grandmother inherited the Maryino Estate, a vast estate in the province of Novgorod (today the Tosno district in Leningrad region), from her mother. The estate was later inherited by her eldest son Prince Pavel Vasilievich Galitzine and his descendants.

== Career ==
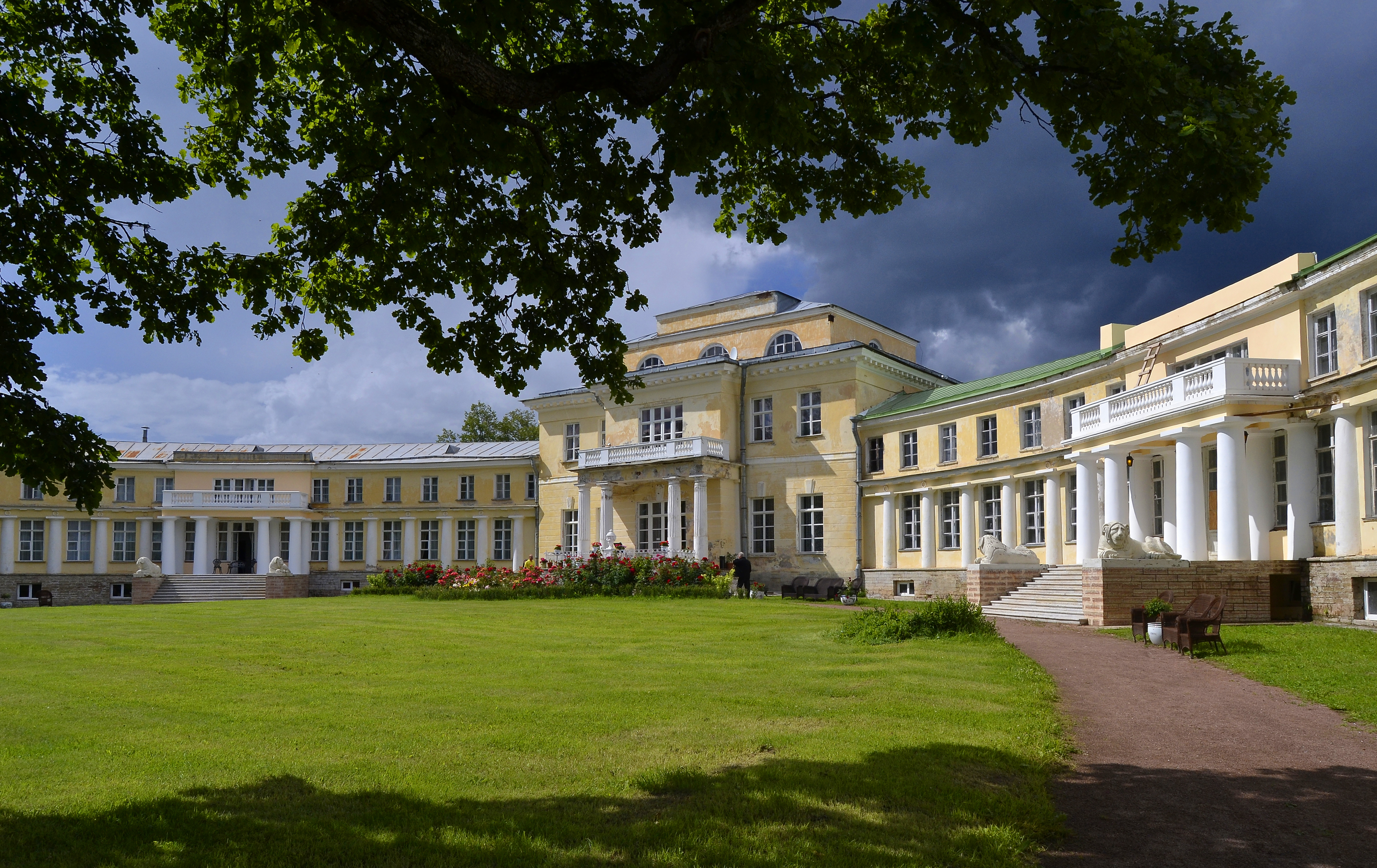
The Maryino Estate

In 1907, Prince Galitzine graduated with honours from the Imperial Lyceum in Moscow. He then moved to St. Petersburg and enlisted as a volunteer in the Horse-Guards Regiment of The Dowager Empress Maria Feodorovna; soon he passed his exams and become an officer. On the eve of the World War I, he was invited to become aide-de-camp to the Grand Duke Nikolai Nikolaevich, commander in chief of the Imperial Russian Army up until 1915, then Viceroy to the Caucasus. Galitzine emigrated from post Revolutionary Russia in June 1919, arranged by his aunt, Princess Helen of Saxe-Altenburg on a British Naval vessel HMS Grafton from Novorossiysk (accompanied by the HMS Marlborough which carried the Tsar's sister, Grand Duchess Xenia and her children, and the Empress Dowager Maria Feodorovna), arriving in Taranto, Italy and gradually making their way as a family to Rome, Paris and eventually arriving in London in July 1919.

In order to support his family, he "proceeded to make a livelihood out of a hobby in which he had long qualified as a connoisseur", by setting up an Art and Antiques shop in Berkeley Street, in Mayfair, of which Queen Mary was a regular customer. The family were nationalised as British in 1933. He became known as a leader of the White Russian émigré colony in London. They initially settled at Coulsdon, Surrey then Nevern Square before they began renting the Georgian country house Chessington Hall in Surrey (the home from which Frances Burney wrote Evelina in 1778), in 1921. They stayed for fourteen years before moving into a house at 131 Croxted Road in West Dulwich, London.

== Personal life ==
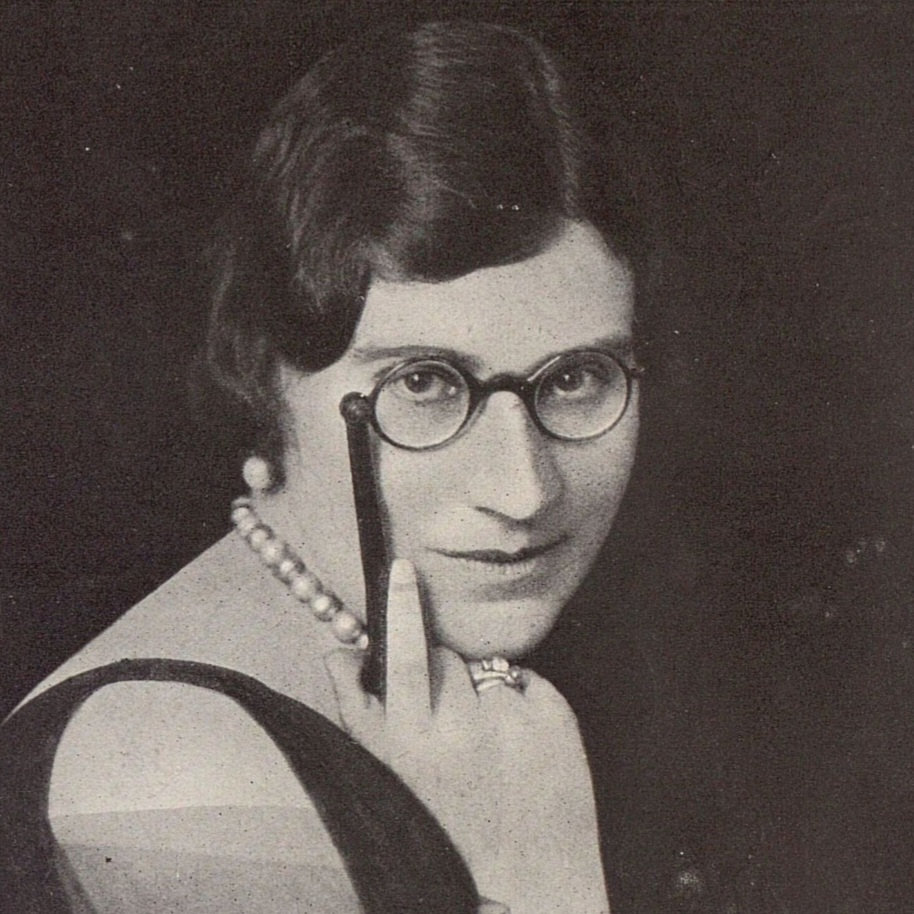
Countess Catherine Helene von Carlow, wife of Vladimir Galizine, photographed in 1925

In 1912, Prince Galitzine was married to Countess Ekaterina "Katia" Georgievna [von] Carlow (1891–1940). Born at Oranienbaum, Russia, Katia was the eldest daughter of the morganatic marriage of Duke Georg Alexander of Mecklenburg-Strelitz and Countess Natalia Feodorovna Vanljarskya, she was also distantly related to the Princess Marina, the Duchess of Kent. Together, they were the parents of:

- Nikolai "Nicholas" Vladimirovich Galitzine (1914–1999), who married Elizabeth Branch, a daughter of Cyril Denzil Branch, in 1946. They divorced in 1955 and he married Anita Frisch, a daughter of Harald Frisch, in 1956.
- George Vladimirovich Galitzine (1916–1992), who married Baroness Anne Marie von Slatin, a daughter of Maj.-Gen. Sir Rudolf von Slatin, in 1943. He later married British fashion model Jean Dawnay in 1963.
- Emanuel Vladimirovich Galitzine (1918–2002), who married Gwendoline Rhodes, a daughter of Capt. Stanley Rhodes of Donaghadee, County Down, Northern Ireland, in 1942. His Obituary with details of his family escape from Russia and his part in World War II as a volunteer during The Winter War in Finland shown in the Picture Post magazine and his time as a Spitfire pilot is found in The Daily Telegraph 9th January 2003.

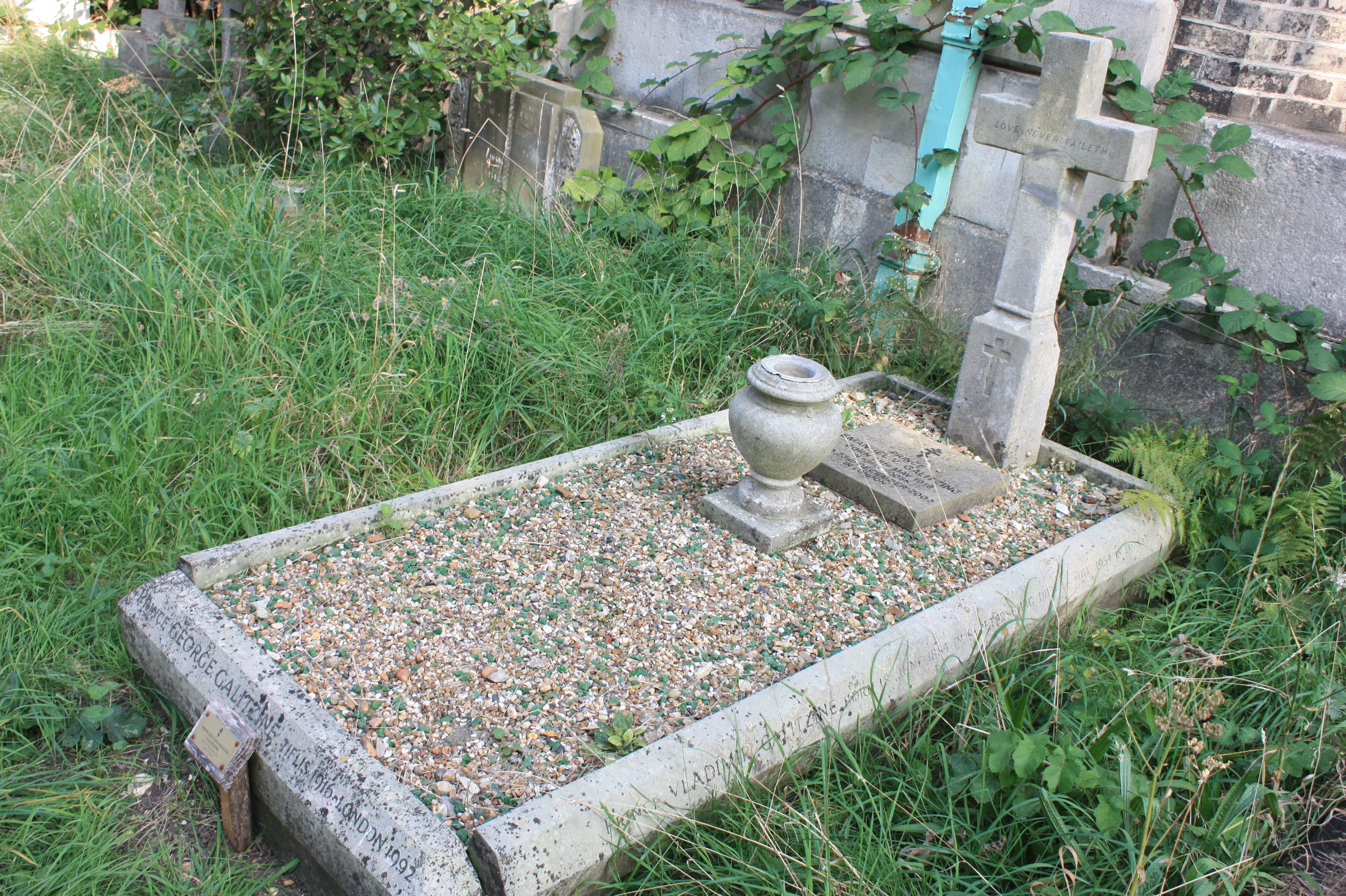
The graves of Princes George and Emanuel Galitzine, Brompton Cemetery, London

After his first wife was killed in October 1940 by a bomb during the first days of The Blitz in World War II, he married Mabel Iris (née FitzGeorge) George (1886-1976), widow of Robert Shekelton Balfour and daughter of Col. George FitzGeorge, from whom Mabel was descended from King George III through the king's grandson, Prince George, Duke of Cambridge, and his mistress Sarah Fairbrother. From her first marriage, she was the mother of Sir Victor FitzGeorge-Balfour.

Prince Galitzine died on 13 July 1954 in a nursing home in London. He was buried at Brompton Cemetery in West Brompton. His widow died in London on 13 April 1976.
