= Barbara (Yakovleva) =

Russian Orthodox saint

Saint Barbara Yakovleva
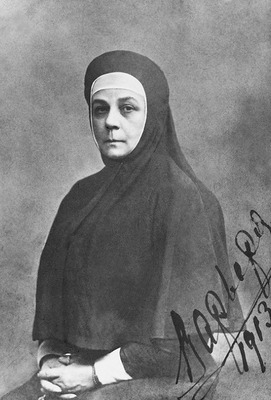

New Martyr
- Born: c. 1880
- Died: 18 July 1918 (aged 37–38); Alapaevsk, Russia
- Venerated in: Eastern Orthodox Church
- Canonized: 1981 by Russian Orthodox Church Abroad; 1992 by the Russian Orthodox Church
- Feast: July 18

Varvara Alexeyevna Yakovleva (Russian: Варвара Алексеевна Яковлева; c. 1880 – July 18, 1918), called Nun Barbara (Russian: Инокиня Варвара), was a Russian Orthodox nun in the convent of Grand Duchess Elizabeth Fyodorovna. She was killed by the Bolsheviks along with the grand duchess and Prince Ioann Konstantinovich of Russia, Prince Konstantin Konstantinovich of Russia, Prince Igor Konstantinovich of Russia, Grand Duke Sergei Mikhailovich of Russia, Fyodor Remez, Grand Duke Sergei's secretary, and Prince Vladimir Pavlovich Paley at Alapaevsk.

She was later canonized as a martyr by both the Russian Orthodox Church Outside Russia and the Russian Orthodox Church within Russia.

== Life ==
There is very little reliable information about her life before entering the Martha and Mary Convent. According to documentary evidence, she came from Tver. She arrived at the Convent from Yalta on August 20, 1910. In 1911, she was 31 years old.

Varvara Alexeyevna Yakovleva, small in stature and deeply pious, served as Grand Duchess Elizabeth's maid before taking the veil. Her nickname was Varya. The Grand Duchess and other women also took vows on that date. As sisters of Grand Duchess Elizabeth's convent, the women were well known throughout Moscow for performing acts of charity. They took food to the homes of the poor, set up a home for women suffering from tuberculosis, established a hospital to care for the sick, as well as establishing homes for the physically disabled, pregnant women and the elderly. They also established an orphanage. Their charitable efforts later spread to other cities in Russia.

== Exile and death ==
Yakovleva voluntarily accompanied Grand Duchess Elizabeth when she was arrested following the Russian Revolution of 1917 and sent into exile. The group was confined at Yekaterinburg and later at Alapaevsk. On the afternoon of July 18, 1918 they were herded into the woods outside Alapaevsk at gunpoint, clubbed on the back of the head, and thrown one by one into a mineshaft in the woods. All but Grand Duke Sergei Mikhailovich, who had been shot in the head, survived the fall. They could be heard singing hymns from the bottom of the shaft. One by one they lost consciousness and died.

== Veneration ==
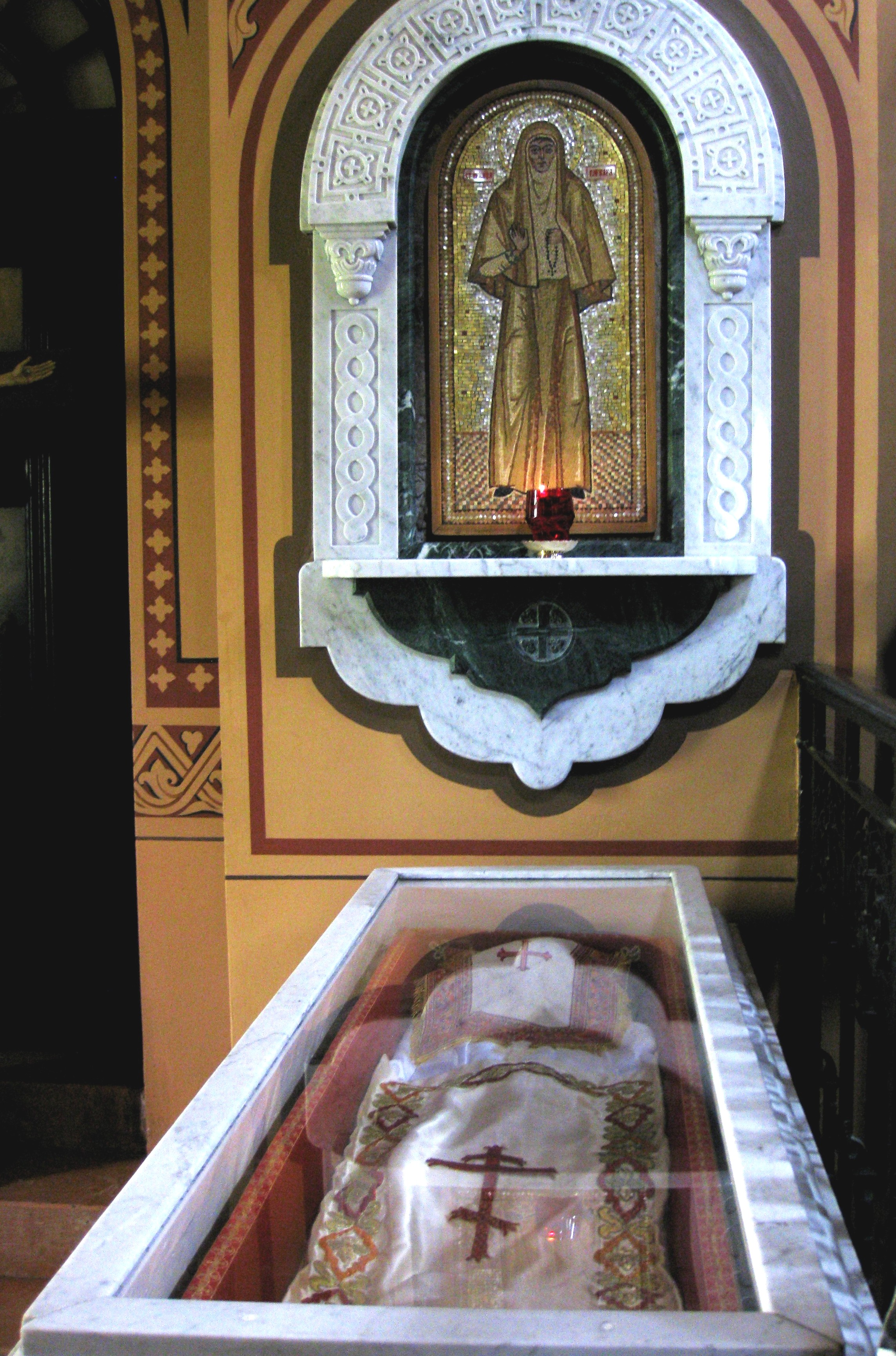
Tomb of St Barbara (Yakovleva) at the Church of Mary Magdalene, Jerusalem

In 1981, Yakovleva was canonized as a "new martyr" by the Russian Orthodox Church Abroad as a victim of Soviet oppression along with the other members of the group. She was in April 1992 also canonized as a martyr by the Russian Orthodox Church inside Russia. In May 1982, the bodies of Grand Duchess Elizabeth Feodorovna of Russia and Barbara (Varvara) were moved from the crypt of the Church of Mary Magdalene, Gethsemane, where only private veneration was possible, to the upper church of St. Mary Magdalene.

== See also ==
- Romanov sainthood

== General and cited references ==
- Mager, Hugo (1998). Elizabeth: Grand Duchess of Russia. Carroll and Graf Publishers. ISBN 0-7867-0678-3
