= Jean Dawnay =

British fashion model (1925–2016)

- Born: 22 March 1925
- Died: 14 December 2016 (aged 91)
- Education: City of London School for Girls; Central School of Art and Design
- Occupations: Television personality, Film actress
- Spouse: Prince George Galitzine

Jean Mary Dawnay, Princess George Galitzine MBE (22 March 1925 – 14 December 2016) was a British fashion model, television personality, stage and film actress, who worked for Christian Dior.

== Early life ==
Jean Mary Dawnay was born in Brighton on 22 March 1925. She was the daughter of Frederick Dawnay and Maud (née Howard) and was educated at the City of London School for Girls and the Central School of Art and Design.

== Career ==
Having joined the WAAF in 1943, she served in World War II under Leo Marks in the Special Operations Executive in Baker Street and at Bletchley Park. Throughout her career she was photographed by many leading photographers including John French, Richard Dormer, Cecil Beaton, Norman Parkinson, Antony Snowdon and Francis Goodman. She was associated with many of the leading fashion houses of the day including Christian Dior, by whom she was dubbed "The English Rose". In their obituary, The Daily Telegraph called her "supermodel of the 1950s".

In later life, Dawnay was active in charity work, including UK Youth (for which she served as a vice president for 60 years), the Prince George Galitzine Library which she co-founded in 1994 in St Petersburg, the Terence Rattigan Society of which she was the inaugural president and Phab.

She was appointed MBE, for services to young people, in the 2012 Queen's Diamond Jubilee Birthday Honours (as Jean Mary Galitzine).

== Personal life ==
In 1963, Dawnay married Prince George Galitzine, a son of Prince Vladimir Galitzine, in Rome. Their daughter Princess Catherine "Katya" Galitzine was born in 1964.

She died on 14 December 2016.

== Filmography ==
- Wonderful Things! as Anne (1958)
