= Wonderful Things! =

1958 British film by Herbert Wilcox

- Directed by: Herbert Wilcox
- Written by: Jack Trevor Story
- Produced by: Anna Neagle
- Starring: Frankie Vaughan; Jeremy Spenser; Jackie Lane; Wilfrid Hyde-White; Jean Dawnay
- Cinematography: Gordon Dines
- Edited by: Basil Warren
- Music by: Stanley Black
- Production company: Herbert Wilcox Productions (as Everest)
- Distributed by: Associated British-Pathé (UK)
- Release date: 10 June 1958; (London) (UK)
- Running time: 84 minutes
- Country: United Kingdom
- Language: English

Wonderful Things! is a 1958 British comedy romance film directed by Herbert Wilcox and starring Frankie Vaughan, Jocelyn Lane and Wilfrid Hyde-White. It was written by Jack Trevor Story. Two fishermen brothers clash over the love of a woman.

It was the second of four films Wilcox made with Vaughan.

The film marked the film debut of comedian Ronnie Barker, in an uncredited role as a waiter.

== Plot ==
Carmello and his brother Mario are unsuccessful fishermen in Gibraltar. Carmelo decides to seek his fortune in London, promising to send the money for his girlfriend Pepita to join him. Mario sells his boat so Petita can travel to London quickly. She realises that it is Mario she truly loves. Meanwhile Carmello has fallen in love with a bored socialite.

== Cast ==
- Frankie Vaughan as Carmello
- Jeremy Spenser as Mario
- Jocelyn Lane as Pepita (as Jackie Lane)
- Wilfrid Hyde-White as Sir Bertram
- Jean Dawnay as Anne
- Eddie Byrne as Harry
- Harold Kasket as Poppa
- Christopher Rhodes as Codger
- Nancy Nevinson as Mamma
- Cyril Chamberlain as butler
- Barbara Goalen as herself
- Liz Fraser as hot dog seller (uncredited)
- Ronnie Barker as waiter (uncredited)

== Box office ==
Kinematograph Weekly said the film "did quite well" at the box office "although the star was given little chance to sing".

== Critical reception ==
The Monthly Film Bulletin wrote: "Unsophisticated and ingenuous, this quaint production lacks the polish which Herbert Wilcox usually brings to his work; if it were not all so unassuming, there would be little left to like beyond Wilfred Hyde White's one good dialogue exchange near the end, the amusingly ironic finale, and the sleek voice and poise of Jean Dawnay. Frankie Vaughan holds the centre of the stage not so much as a singer (though he has a few songs in the unaffected style of the rest of the film) but as an actor. He is noticeably less professional in this respect than the rest of the cast."

Sky Movies wrote, "If you can believe in Frankie Vaughan and Jeremy Spenser as Gibraltar fishermen, you'll enjoy this Anna Neagle-produced trifle about love and life, Latin-style. Fiery Jackie Lane eclipses model Jean Dawnay's screen debut."

TV Guide called the film an "engaging romance."

AllMovie wrote: "Wilfred Hyde-White offers the film's best performance as the debutante's dry-witted papa."
