= Marfo-Mariinsky Convent =

Monastery in Moscow, Russia

Coordinates: 55°44′15.6″N 37°37′21.8″E

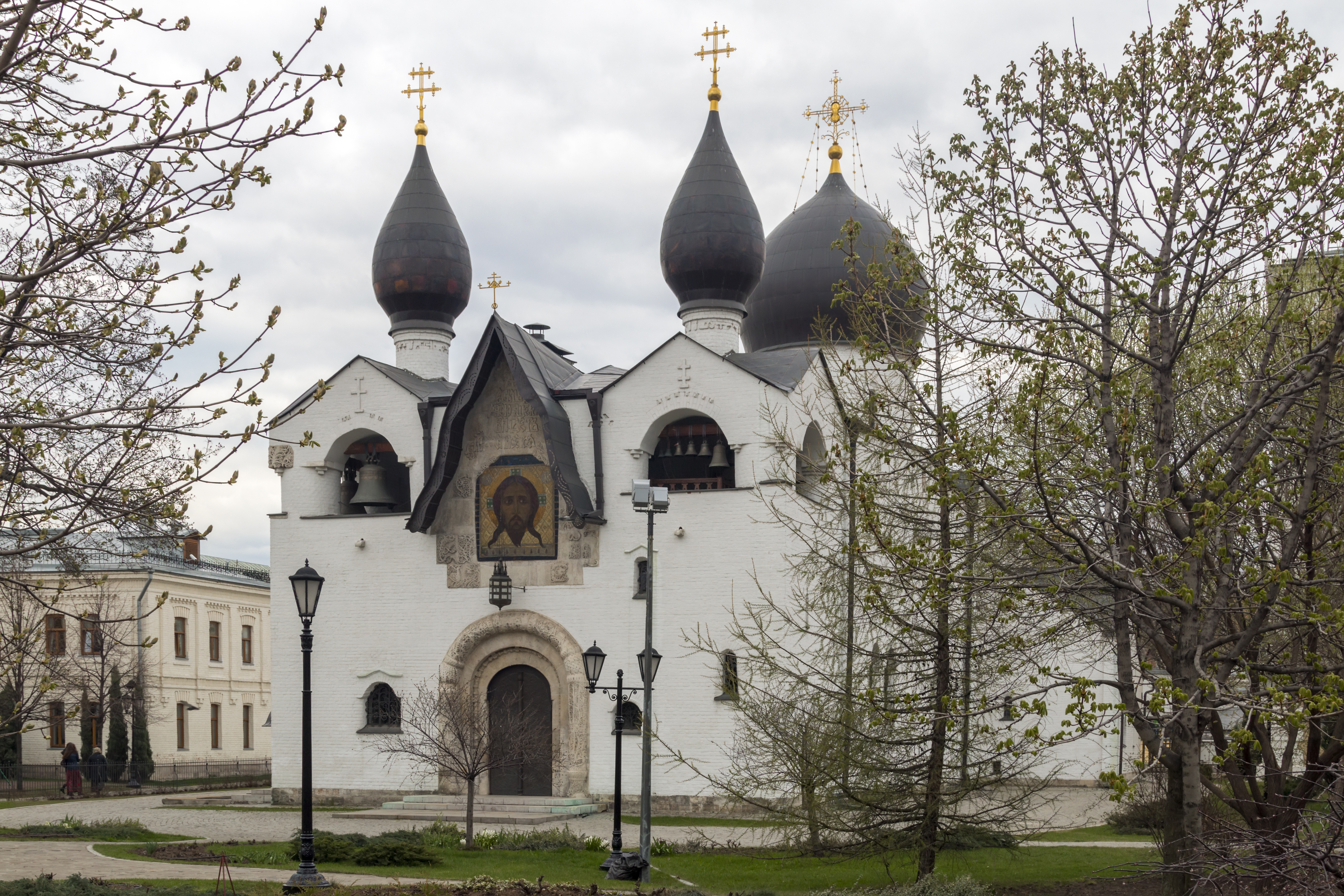
The katholikon was designed by Aleksey Shchusev

Marfo-Mariinsky Convent, or Martha and Mary Convent of Mercy in the Possession of Grand Duchess Elizabeth Feodorovna (Russian: Марфо-Мариинская обитель, Марфо-Мариинская обитель милосердия во владении великой княгини Елизаветы Фёдоровны, romanized: Marfo-Mariinskaya obitel', Marfo-Mariinskaya obitel' milosyerdiya vo vladyenii velikoy knyagini Yelizabety Fyodorovny) is a women's convent in Moscow.

The convent was founded in 1908 by Grand Duchess Elizabeth Feodorovna (sister of Alexandra Feodorovna, the last Empress of Russia—both of whom are counted among the Russian New Martyrs) to assist sick, wounded, and maimed soldiers in their recovery, and to provide for the needs of the poor and orphans.

== History ==
Grand Duchess Elizabeth was the widow of Grand Duke Sergeii Alexandrovich, who had been assassinated by terrorists in 1905.

After her husband's death, she gave away her magnificent collection of jewels, including her wedding ring, and sold her other possessions. With the proceeds, she opened the Convent of SS Martha and Mary and became its abbess. Her vision was to begin a religious community, made up of women from all social strata, that would merge the ideals of saints Martha and Mary, dedicated both to prayer and to serving the needs of the poor.

She purchased a tract of land in Moscow and constructed a hospital, an orphanage for girls, and quarters for the nuns. Working in conjunction with church authorities she developed the monastic rule and habit — which differed somewhat from the traditional habit of Orthodox nuns — that would be used at the convent. At its peak, the convent housed 97 sisters and served 300 meals daily to the poor.

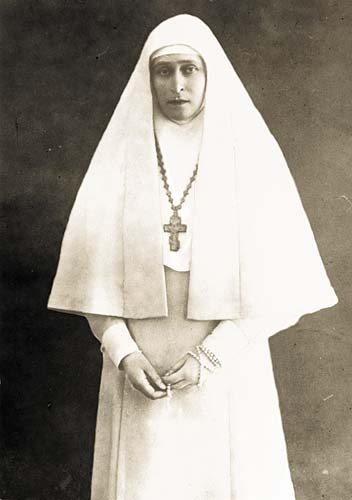
Grand Duchess Elizabeth wearing the monastic habit she designed for the convent.

From 1908 to 1912, Alexey Shchusev designed the Church of Saints Martha and Mary and the Holy Protection Cathedral, both structures being Russian Revival and Art Nouveau renderings of a medieval Novgorod architectural type. The cathedral's snow-white walls are adorned with carved crosses by Sergey Konenkov. The interior contains frescoes and mosaics by Mikhail Nesterov and Pavel Korin.

== Life within the convent ==
The sisters woke at 6:00 a.m. and organized their rooms. At 7:30 they gathered in the hospital chapel for a common rule of prayer followed by the reading of a gospel, an epistle, a psalm, and perhaps a brief sermon by the priest serving that day. The sisters departed from the chapel after receiving a blessing from the priest and greeting the mother superior. They then gathered for some tea before going to their daily obediences. Those who were not immediately needed at their obedience remained in the chapel for the Divine Liturgy.

Sisters were responsible for the reading and chanting in both churches. The chant was generally of a simple monastic style, with concert singing very seldom used. The choir members also did handiwork in the community workshop, where all the clothing of the sisters was made. Following morning prayers, the sisters would be found at their various obediences: some in the hospital awaiting the doctors making rounds, others in the clinic to provide treatment such as massages, injections, etc., for the ailing, others in the school, and yet others in the kitchen or other areas of the house. Twice a week between the hours of 11:00 a.m. and 12:00 p.m. the spiritual father offered the sisters a lecture, one week on the catechism, and the following week one on the holy fathers. The sisters prepared for Holy Communion at least four times a year during the major fasts, though they were allowed to receive it more often if they wished.

At 12:30 lunch was served with the reading of the life of the saint of the day during the meal. Meals were prepared in accordance with church fasting rules. Tea was served at 4:00 p.m. followed by vespers and matins at 5:00 p.m. Sisters who had completed their obediences were present at these services. Before feast days and Sundays, all-night vigils were held. At 7:30 p.m. dinner was served. There was common evening prayer at 9:00 p.m. in the hospital chapel. The sisters retired to their cells following prayer, receiving a blessing from the superior as they departed. By 10:30 p.m. all prepare for sleep, and by 11:00 p.m. there was quiet and all lights were extinguished.

== Spiritual life ==
For their spiritual strengthening and edification the sisters visited with the Abbess or spiritual father at appointed times. Four times a week an akathist hymn was read during the evening prayer rule: on Sundays, to the Savior; Mondays, to Archangel Michael and all the Heavenly Hosts; Wednesdays, to Sts. Martha and Mary; and Fridays, to the Mother of God or the Passion of Christ. The sisters were also obliged to attend Vigil and Liturgy at the Chudov Monastery on the feast days of the holy hierarch St. Alexis of Moscow, February 12 and May 20. A pilgrimage was also made to the sepulchre church of the Grand Duke Sergei Alexandrovich on February 4, the day of his repose.

== Habit of the convent ==
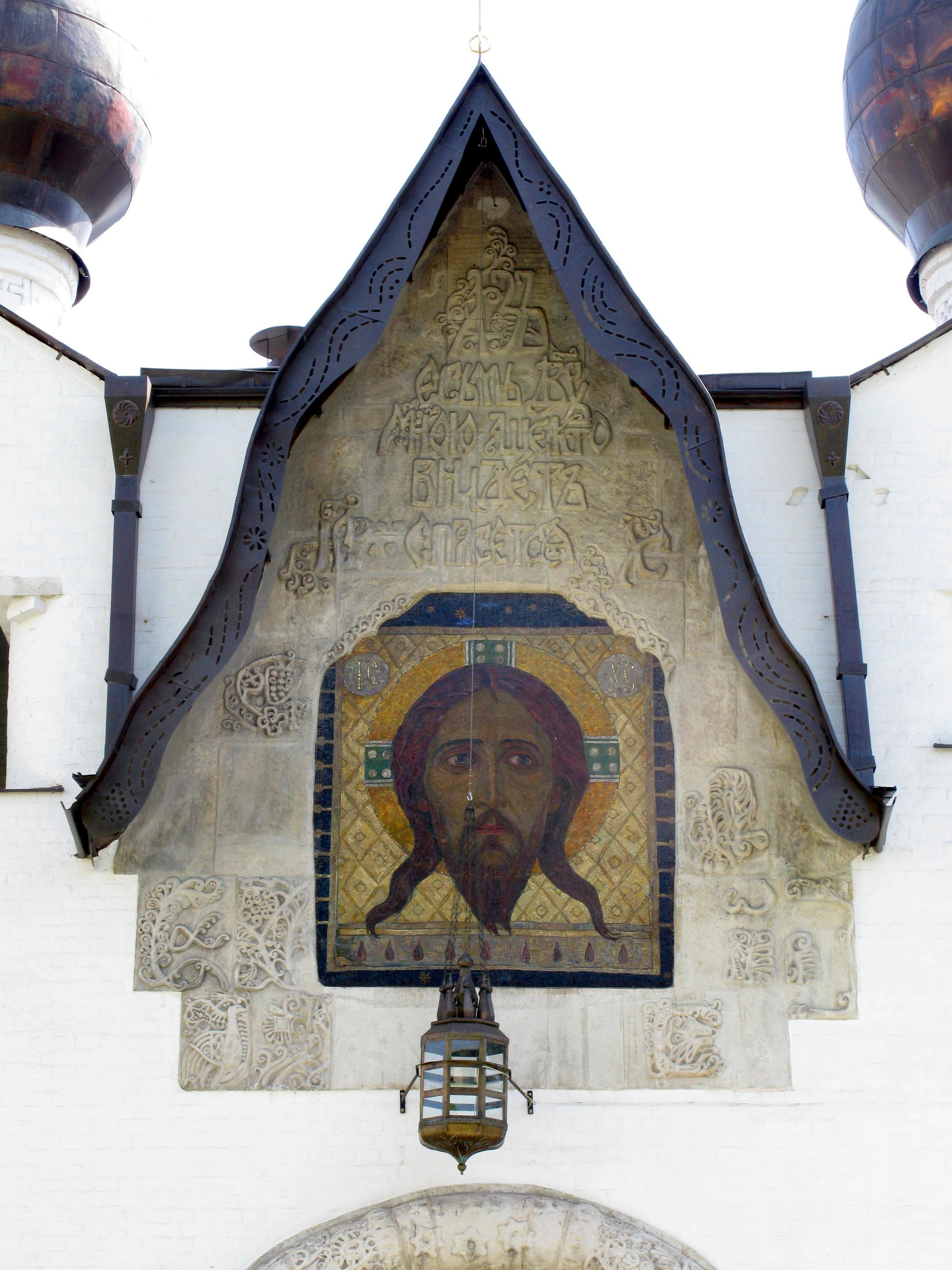
The Holy Mandylion icon over the main door.

The sisters wore white cotton robes on Sundays and feast days. The work uniform was a grey cotton robe cut like a cassock, sewn together in front and closed on the sides. with white cuffs on the sleeves. The head covering of tonsured members was a white apostolnik cut in the monastic style with a grey woolen veil. Those tonsured also wore a cross made of cypress wood around their necks on a white string. The icons of the Image of Edessa and the Protection of the Mother of God were displayed on one side of the cross; the other side held an icon of Sts. Martha and Mary and the inscription: "Thou shalt Love the Lord thy God with all thy heart, and all your soul, and all thy mind, and all thy strength; Thou shalt love thy neighbor as thyself." Sisters received this cross at their tonsure into the sisterhood, giving a vow to devote this specific period of their lives to God and neighbor, and to abide by the rules of the community.

All sisters were given a prayer rope upon entering the community with the obligation to recite the Jesus Prayer 100 times daily. Postulants did not wear the prayer rope externally, but those tonsured wore the prayer rope they received a second time at their tonsure on their left hand. Postulants wore a long white kerchief on their heads, which covered their foreheads completely. On Sundays and feast days the sisters wore white robes. The postulants wore gray robes.

== Charitable works ==
A primary obligation of the sisters was to visit the poor. A few sisters were sent out daily in pairs to visit assigned areas of the city. The Grand Duchess received over twelve thousand petitions annually. A portion of these were reviewed by the sisters, processed along with the numerous other requests and information about the poor received from other sources.

== Closure ==
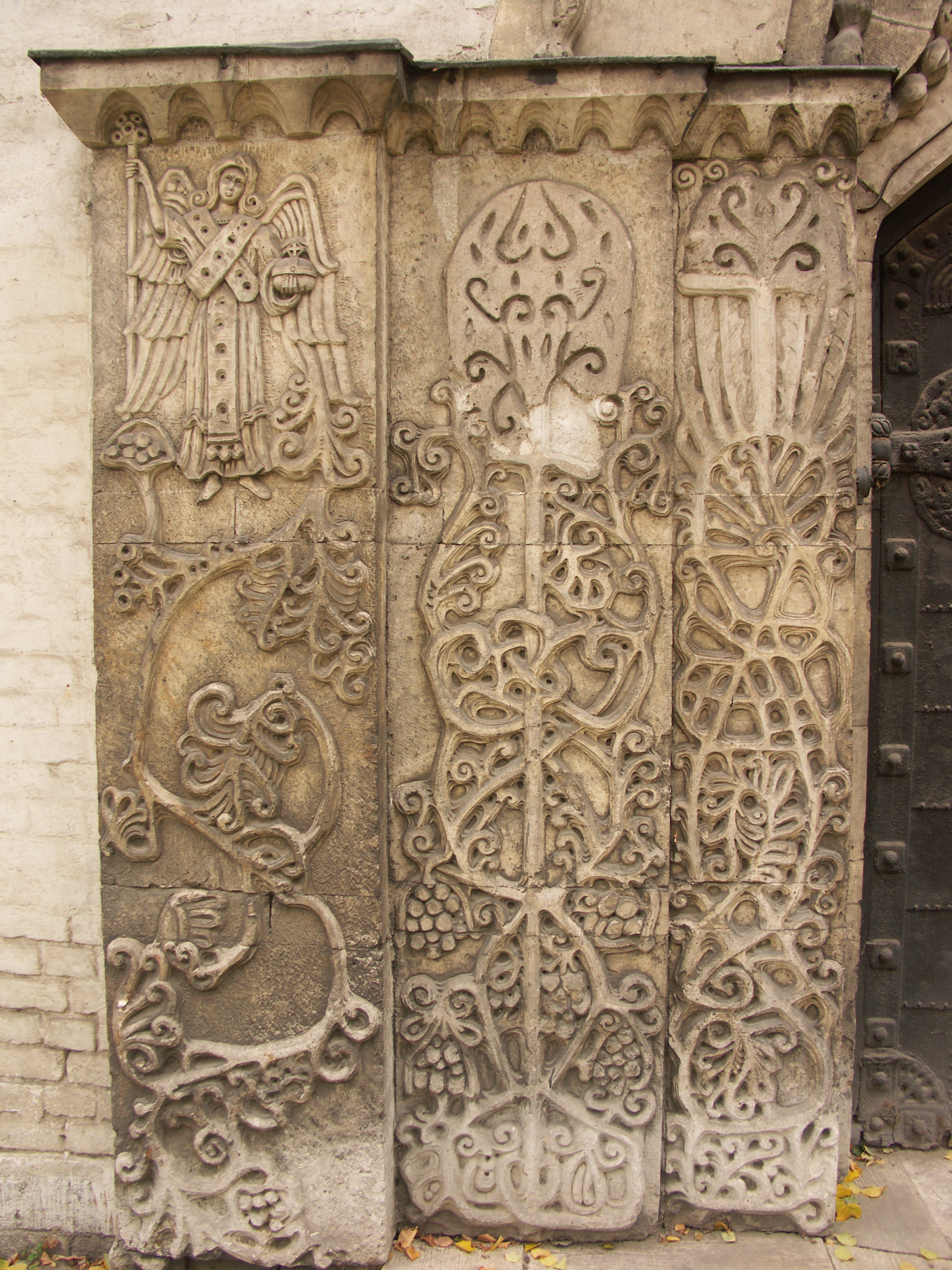
The elaborate stone tracery

In 1920, the convent was forced by the Soviet authorities to provide a comprehensive listing of the Order's properties, both moveable and immoveable. This document contained not only information concerning the Cathedral of the Holy Protection, but also information concerning the properties of the lower church of the Archangel Michael and All the Bodiless Powers, the hospital Church of Sts. Martha and Mary, the funerary chapel, and the psaltery. This extraordinary catalogue and several which were later published provide a complete enumeration of the liturgical objects, icons, artworks, valuables, and their placement.

Despite the anti-religious sentiment, it was well understood that the convent and its churches represented a rare gesamtkunstwerk (complete work of art), and that its synergy of architecture, decoration, and collections of fine and decorative art were exceedingly important.

By 1922, however, the government began to order a systematic nationalization and confiscation of the convent's property, beginning to remove valuable gold and silver objects such as ikon oklads, rizas, gospel covers, crosses and ecclesiastical and liturgical objects.

In 1923, the convent tried to remake itself as the "Martha and Mary Community of Industry" in order to continue their works despite the civil war and official atheist position of the government. By 1925, the convent was being attacked for its makeup of former aristocrats and bourgeoises, and soon, the organization was under strain.

In 1926, the Church of Sts. Martha & Mary was closed, though the remaining nuns were able to remove over 200 icons and the "royal doors" from the cathedral by moving them to the Church of the Holy Protection. Shortly after this, the order was officially disbanded, and eighteen of the remaining nuns were exiled to Turkestan in Central Asia.

In 1928, both churches were finally closed, looted, pillaged, and desecrated. The frescos by Nesterov were covered and the church was turned into a movie theater. From 1945, the church was used by the Grabar Institute as an icon and painting restoration studio.

== Restoration of the order and convent complex ==
Veneration of the Grand Duchess as a Saint and New Martyr had begun outside of Russia soon after her interment at Jerusalem, and her memory was honored secretly within the Soviet Union. With the collapse of communism, official attitudes changed. Elizabeth had already been canonized by the Russian Orthodox Church Abroad in 1981, but in 1990 a monument was erected on the convent grounds, and in 1992, the Grand Duchess was glorified (canonized) by the Russian Orthodox Church (see Romanov sainthood). Later that year, the celebration of divine services was resumed in the Church of Martha and Mary, and in 1994 the sisterhood was re-established.

In 1999 the Educational Center of the SS Martha and Mary Convent of Mercy was founded, with the blessings of Patriarch Alexy II of Moscow and All Russia, for the purpose of training Orthodox girls as certified nurses.

The Four Evangelists, by Mikhail Nesterov. Painted details of the royal doors.

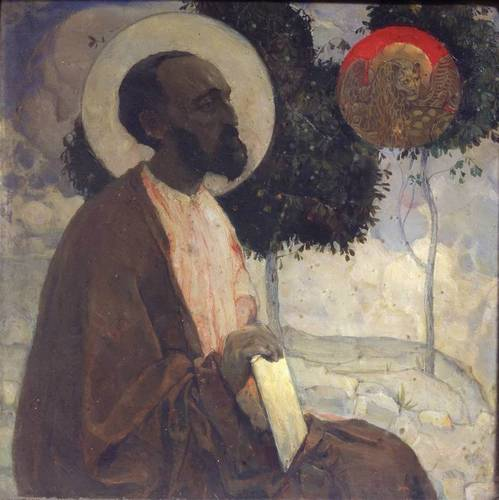

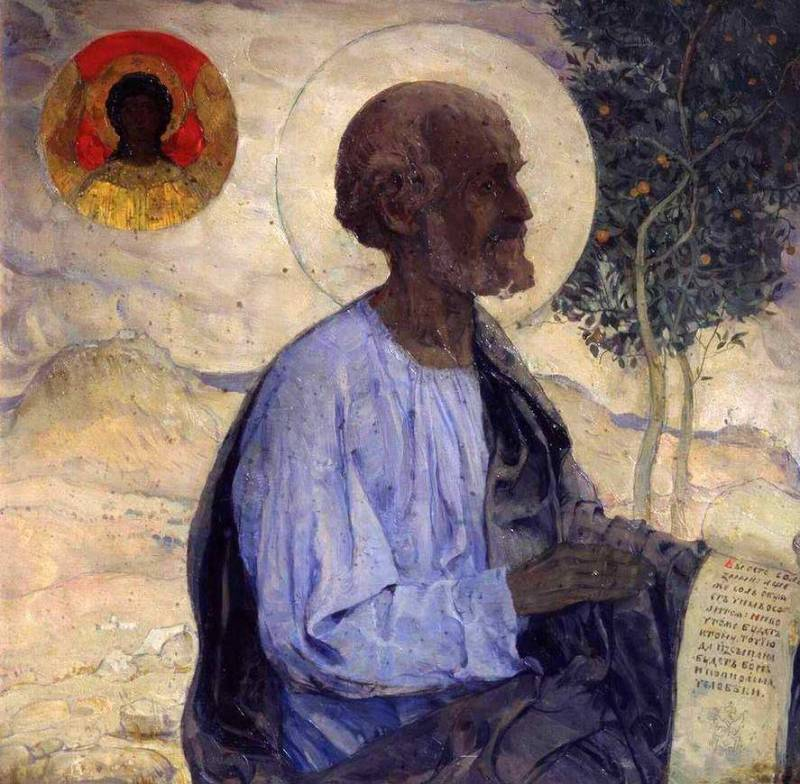

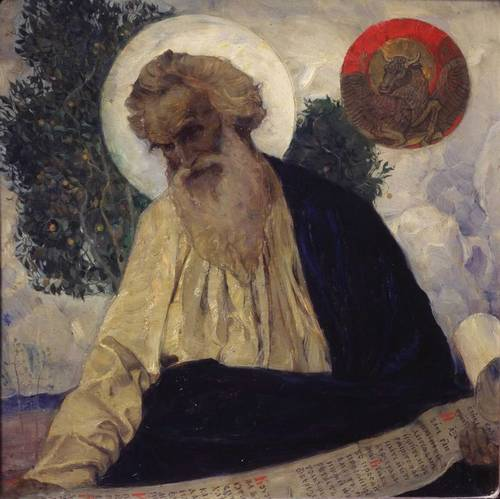

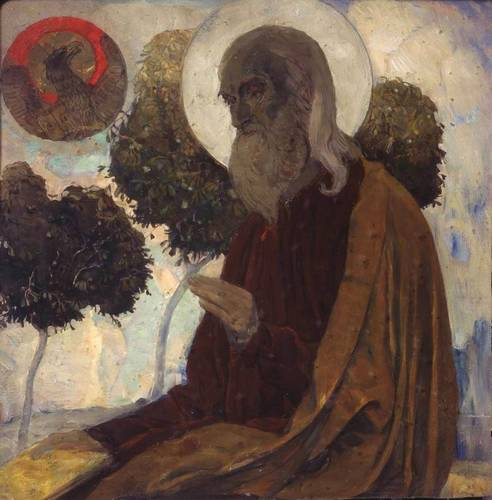

== Royal British, Greek, and Danish connections to the convent ==
As a granddaughter of Queen Victoria, Grand Duchess Elizabeth is closely related to the Greek, Danish, and British Royal families.

Elizabeth's older sister was Victoria, Marchioness of Milford-Haven, whose daughter Alice married Prince Andrew of Greece and Denmark. Princess Alice became the mother of Prince Philip, Duke of Edinburgh, and later founded a nursing order of Greek Orthodox nuns, the "Christian Sisterhood of Martha and Mary". This was modelled on the Marfo-Mariinsky Convent that her aunt had founded in Russia, but the order eventually failed for want of suitable applicants. Princess Alice was buried near Grand Duchess Elizabeth in the Russian Orthodox Church of Mary Magdalen on the Mount of Olives in Jerusalem.

In 2002, HRH Prince Charles commissioned the British composer and convert to the Russian Orthodox Church, John Tavener, to write a choral piece in memory of his grandmother, Queen Elizabeth the Queen Mother. The work was entitled "Elizabeth Full of Grace" and celebrates the life, death and glorification of Saint Elizabeth the Grand Duchess. It was premiered at St George's Chapel, Windsor Castle on 28 February 2003 by Valery Gergiev and the Mariinsky Chorus and Orchestra. Proceeds from the performance went to benefit the charitable work of the Saints Martha and Mary Convent of Mercy.

== Sources ==
- Elizabeth, "The Martha and Mary Convent and Rule of St. Elizabeth the New Martyr", Jordanville, New York: Holy Trinity Monastery, 2005.
- Kozlov, Vladimir, "Marfo-Mariinskaia Obshchina Sest'or Miloserdia v 1920-e Gody (po arkhivnym materialam)," Nekropol, August 2001.
- "Marfo-Mariinskaia Obitel' Miloserdie." Moscow: Synodal Printing House, 1914.
- Materialy k Zhitiu Prepodobnomuchenitsy Velikoi Kniagini Yelizavety: pis'ma, dnevniki, vospominania, dokumenty. Moscow: Saint Tikhon's Orthodox Theological Institute, 1995.
- Miller, Lubov Grand Duchess Elizabeth of Russia, New Martyr of the Communist Yoke. New York: NOPS, 1991. (Sixth Ed. 2006)
