= Princess Elisabeth of Hesse and by Rhine =

Grand Duchess of Russia

Princess Elisabeth
- Grand Duchess Elizabeth Feodorovna of Russia
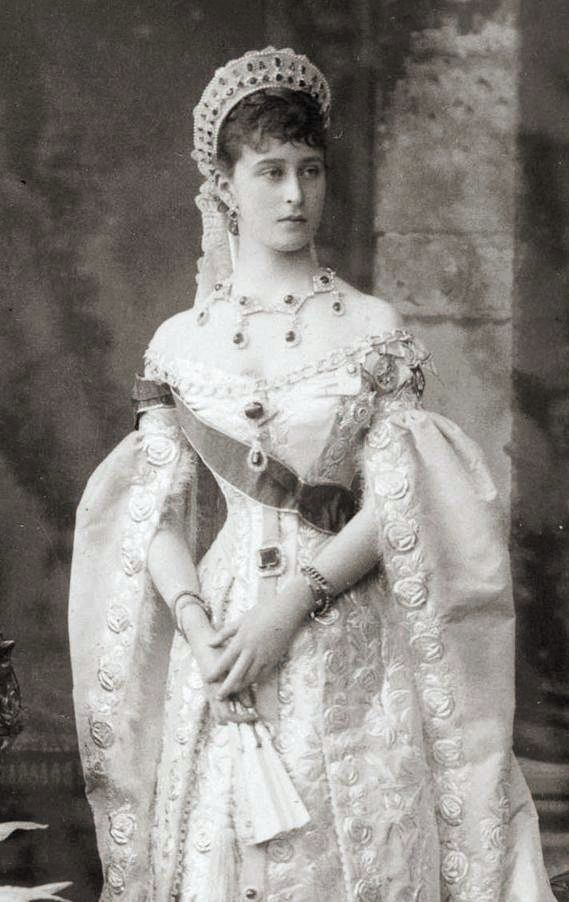
- Photograph by Charles Bergamasco, 1885
- Born: 1 November 1864; Bessungen, Hesse, German Confederation
- Died: 18 July 1918 (aged 53); Alapayevsk, Russia
- Cause of death: Murder
- Burial: Church of Mary Magdalene, Gethsemane, Jerusalem
- Spouse: Grand Duke Sergei Alexandrovich of Russia (m. 1884; died 1905)
Names
- English: Elisabeth Alexandra Louise Alice; German: Elisabeth Alexandra Luise Alix; Russian: Елизавета Фёдоровна Романова
- House: Hesse-Darmstadt
- Father: Louis IV, Grand Duke of Hesse and by Rhine
- Mother: Princess Alice of the United Kingdom
- Religion: Russian Orthodox prev. Lutheranism
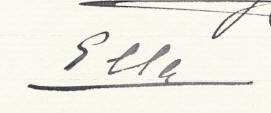
- Signature

Princess Elisabeth of Hesse and by Rhine (Elisabeth Alexandra Louise Alice; 1 November 1864 – 18 July 1918), later known as Grand Duchess Elizabeth Feodorovna of Russia, was a German princess of the House of Hesse-Darmstadt, and the wife of Grand Duke Sergei Alexandrovich of Russia, the fifth son of Emperor Alexander II of Russia and Princess Marie of Hesse and by Rhine.

A granddaughter of Queen Victoria and an older sister of Alexandra, the last Russian empress, Elisabeth became famous in Russian society for her dignified beauty and charitable works for the poor. Elisabeth married Grand Duke Sergei on 15 (3) June 1884. The couple never had children of their own, but their Ilyinskoye estate was usually filled with parties that Elisabeth organized especially for children. They eventually became the foster parents of Grand Duke Dmitry Pavlovich and Grand Duchess Maria Pavlovna, Sergei's niece and nephew.

After the Socialist Revolutionary Party's Combat Organization assassinated her husband with a bomb in 1905, Elisabeth publicly forgave Sergei's murderer, Ivan Kalyayev, and unsuccessfully campaigned for him to be pardoned. She then left the royal society and became a nun. She opened the Marfo-Mariinsky Convent and spent time helping the poor of Moscow.

During the February Revolution of 1917, Elisabeth's brother-in-law, Emperor Nicholas II, was forced to abdicate the throne. The political upheavals initially had no impact on life in the monastery. However, Elisabeth was worried about her relatives, who were under house arrest in the Alexander Palace in Tsarskoye Selo. She kept in touch with her sister Alexandra, even when she was in exile in Tobolsk, although under considerably more difficult conditions. In 1918, she was arrested and ultimately murdered by Bolsheviks. Elisabeth was canonized by the Russian Orthodox Church Outside Russia in 1981 and by the Russian Orthodox Church in 1992.

== Early life ==
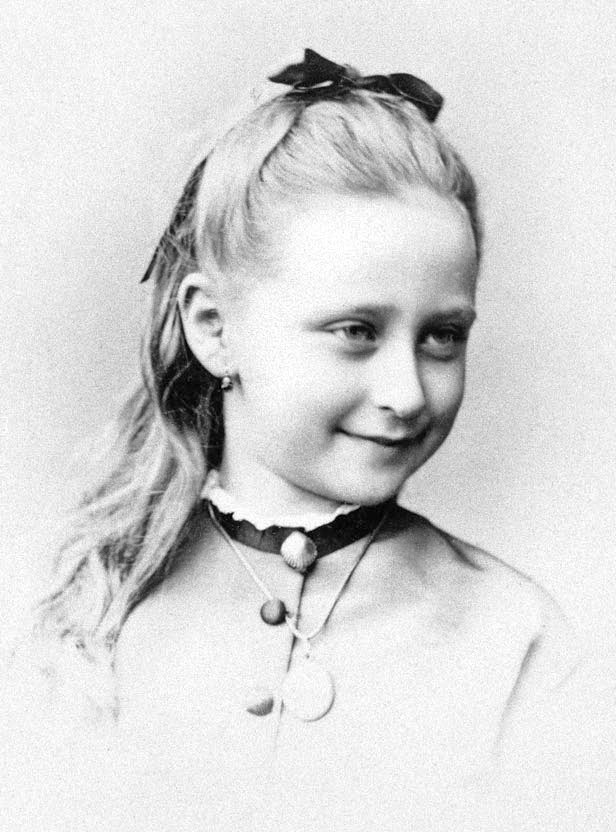
Elisabeth in 1871

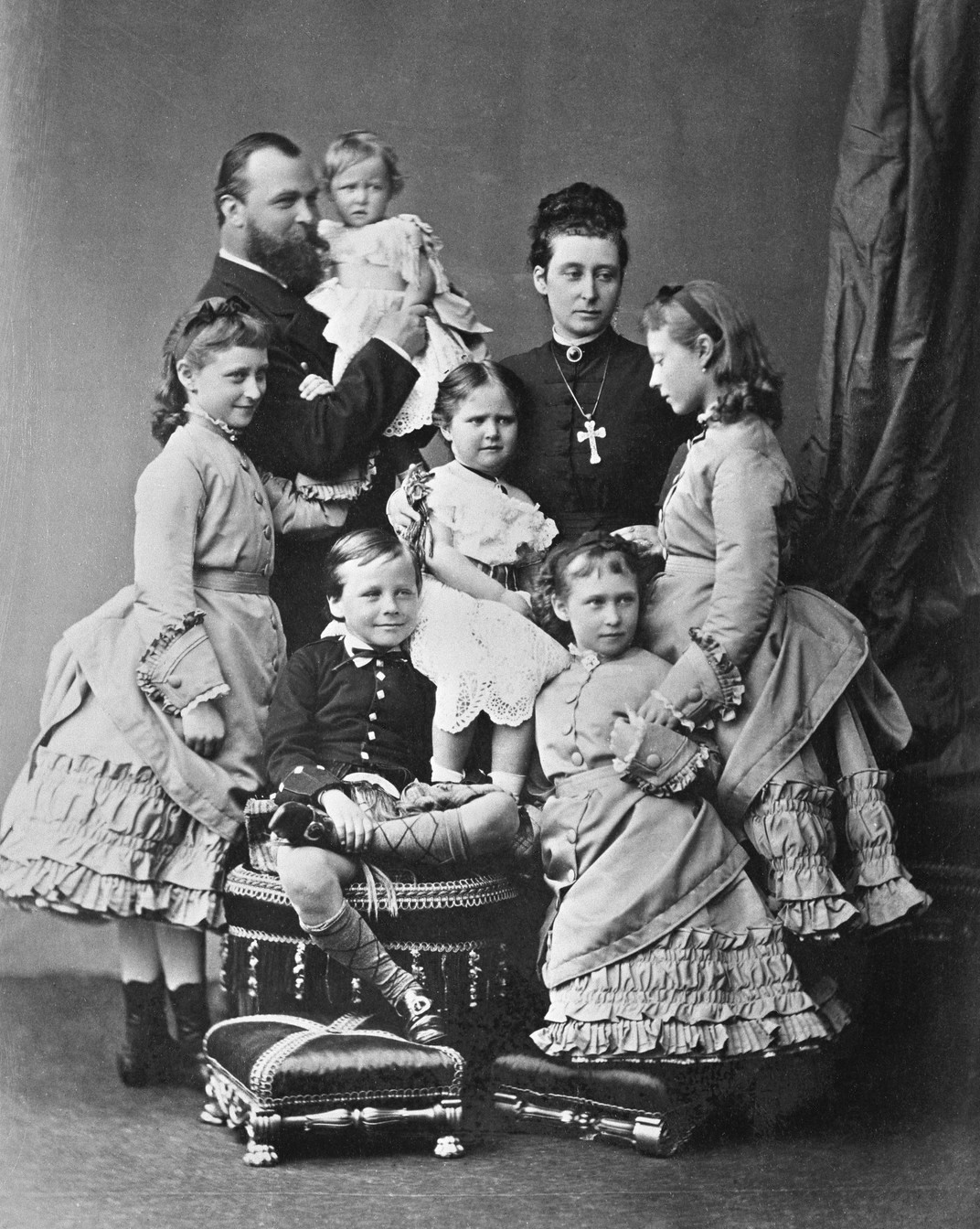
The Hessian grand ducal family in May 1875

Elisabeth was born on 1 November 1864, as the second child of Ludwig IV, Grand Duke of Hesse and by Rhine, and Princess Alice, daughter of Queen Victoria. Having named their firstborn Victoria, after her maternal grandmother, the parents named their second daughter in honour of two women named Elisabeth. She was given the names Elisabeth Alexandra Louise Alice (German: Elisabeth Alexandra Luise Alix), with "Elisabeth" being given to honour both St. Elizabeth of Hungary (the ancestress of the House of Hesse) and her paternal grandmother, Princess Elisabeth of Prussia.

At her christening on 28 November, the infant was sponsored by her grandmother Princess Charles, her great-uncle Alexander II of Russia, her aunts Alix (Princess of Wales), her mother's sister, Helena, and Anna of Mecklenburg-Schwerin, and her uncles Prince Alfred and Fritz, Crown Prince of Prussia. To her family, she would be known simply as Ella.

Alice brought up her daughters simply. An English nanny presided over the nursery, and the children ate plain meals of rice puddings and baked apples and wore plain dresses. Her daughters were taught how to do housework, such as baking cakes, making their own beds, laying fires and sweeping and dusting their rooms. Alice also emphasized the need to give to the poor and often took her daughters on visits to hospitals and charities.

The family was devastated in 1873 when Ella's hemophiliac younger brother Friedrich, nicknamed "Frittie", fell through an open window, struck his head on the balustrade, and died hours later of a brain haemorrhage. In the months following the toddler's death, Alice frequently took her children to his grave to pray and was melancholy on anniversaries associated with him.

On the afternoon of 7 November 1878, Victoria although complaining of a sore throat, sat down to read to her brother and sisters. Later that evening she began to run a fever and was put to bed. The following morning, when her daughter was no better, the Grand Duchess called for the family physician, Dr Eigenbrodt, who, to Alice's great concern, discovered a white membrane on both sides of Victoria's throat, the first sign of diphtheria. This was the most traumatic and tragic sequence of events in the lives of the grand ducal family. Of all six children, Ella remained unaffected.

Ella was moved out of Victoria's room. On 10 November Alix fell ill. On 13 November, in an attempt to keep Ella free of the disease, Alice sent her with her governess, Miss Jackson, to stay with her grandmother, Princess Charles. Elisabeth's sister Marie died on 16 November 1878, and her mother Alice died on 14 December. When Ella was finally allowed to return home, she described the meeting as "terribly sad" and said that everything was "like a horrible dream". At last Ella could see the family. "It was a terrible sad meeting", she wrote "no-one daring to speak of what was uppermost in their thoughts. Poor papa looked dreadfully."

== Admirers and suitors ==
Charming and with a very accommodating personality, Elisabeth was considered by many historians and contemporaries to be one of the most beautiful women in Europe at that time. Her cousin Princess Marie of Edinburgh wrote that "one could never take one's eyes off [Ella]" and that Ella's features were "exquisite beyond words, it almost brought tears to your eyes". Her older cousin Prince Wilhelm of Prussia called her "exceedingly beautiful, in fact she is the most beautiful girl I ever saw". Baroness Sophie Buxhoeveden, her sister's lady-in-waiting, reflected that she was "a very pretty girl, tall and fair, with regular features".

When Elisabeth was a young woman, her cousin Prince Wilhelm of Prussia fell in love with her. In April 1875, 16-year-old Wilhelm visited Darmstadt to celebrate Princess Victoria's 12th birthday and first expressed interest in 11-year-old Elisabeth. He wrote in a letter to his mother that, "If God grants that I may live till then I shall make her my bride once if you allow it". When he was a student at Bonn University, Wilhelm often visited his aunt Alice and his Hessian relatives on the weekends. During these frequent visits, he fell in love with Elisabeth, but she declined his offer of marriage.

Henry Wilson, later a distinguished soldier, also vied unsuccessfully for Elisabeth's hand. The future Frederick II, Grand Duke of Baden, Wilhelm's first cousin, proposed to Elisabeth. Queen Victoria described him as "so good and steady" with "such a safe and happy position".

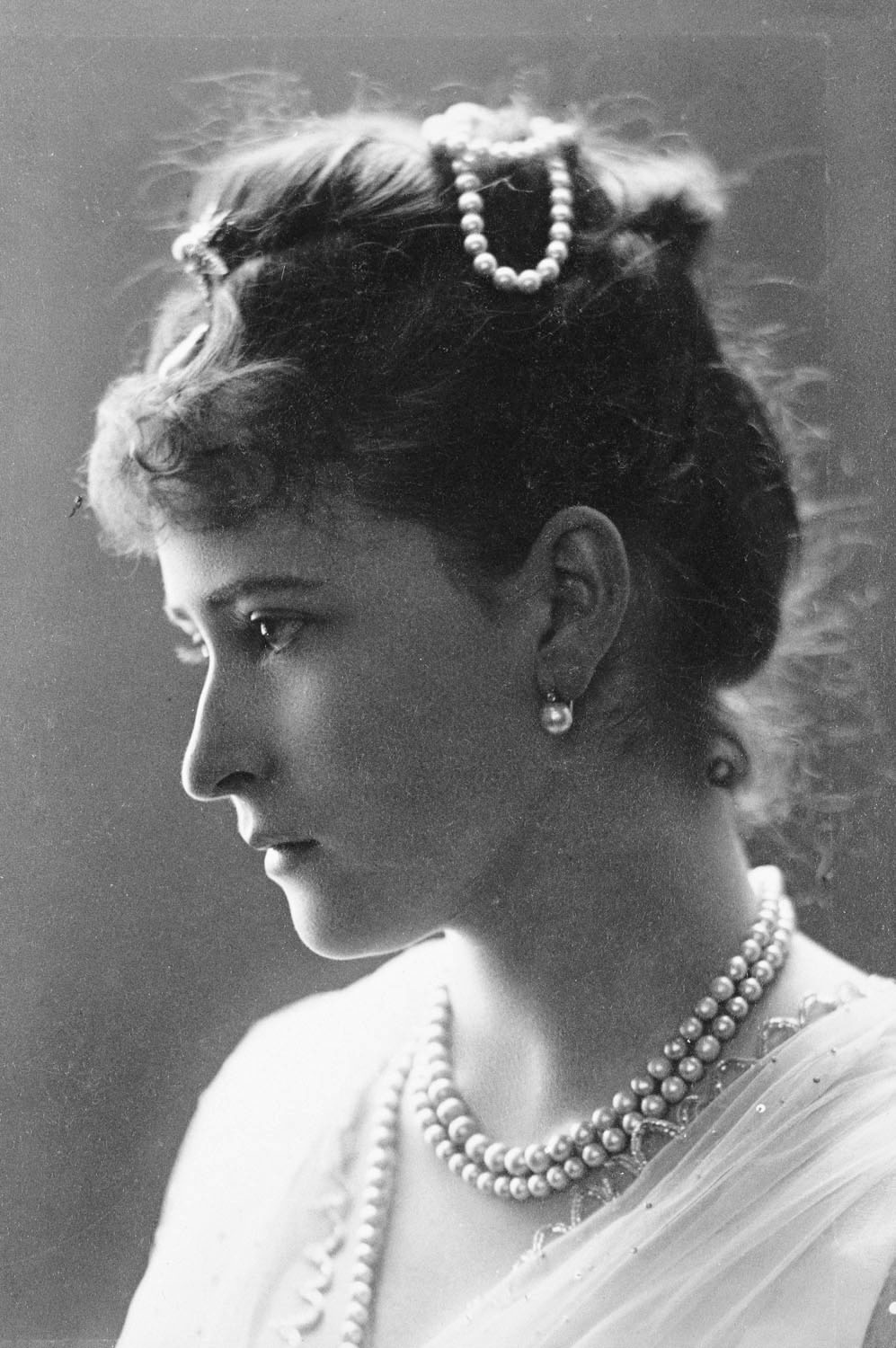
Princess Elisabeth of Hesse, 1887

Other admirers included:

- Grand Duke Konstantin Konstantinovich of Russia (the poet KR), who wrote a poem about her first arrival in Russia and the general impression she made to all the people present at the time.
- As a young girl, Queen Marie of Romania was very fascinated with her cousin Ella. In her memoirs, she wrote that "her beauty and sweetness was a thing of dreams".
- The French Ambassador to the Russian court, Maurice Paleologue, wrote in his memoirs how Elisabeth was capable of arousing what he described as "profane passions".

== Engagement and marriage ==
Ella and Sergei celebrated their engagement with her family at Darmstadt in February 1884. Sergei, for his part, was soon writing home to his brother Paul, "Ella is, if possible, even more beautiful. We both sit together a lot. In the mornings she is in my room, and I teach her some Russian, which is very funny. I even make her write. I also teach her the words to 'god save the tsar'. Now we often go out all over Darmstadt alone."

They were first cousins once removed (Elisabeth's great-grandfather, her father's paternal grandfather, Louis II, Grand Duke of Hesse, was Sergei's maternal grandfather) and had known each other all their lives. There were hesitations on both sides, and Elisabeth first rejected his proposal of marriage. Queen Victoria, who had anti-Russian sentiments, opposed the marriage of her motherless granddaughter. Elisabeth and her surviving sisters were not pressured into following political marriages; they were allowed to follow their own inclination. After the couple spent some time together at Schloss Wolfsgarten in Darmstadt in September 1883, Elisabeth agreed to marry him. Their engagement was announced publicly on 26 February 1884 when Sergei returned to visit her in Darmstadt.

When he arrived at the Neues Palais that February, he had with him a wealth of jewels that he showered on his bride-to-be. Among the engagement presents Sergei brought with him to Darmstadt were ropes of jewellery and brooches of ores. Ella herself recalled how Sergei, having insisted that she put them all on at once, pinned each and every brooch onto her dress until she could hardly stand under the weight. 'I looked like a Christmas tree!' she wrote, 'And we had a terrible time getting them all off because we couldn't find the clasps'.

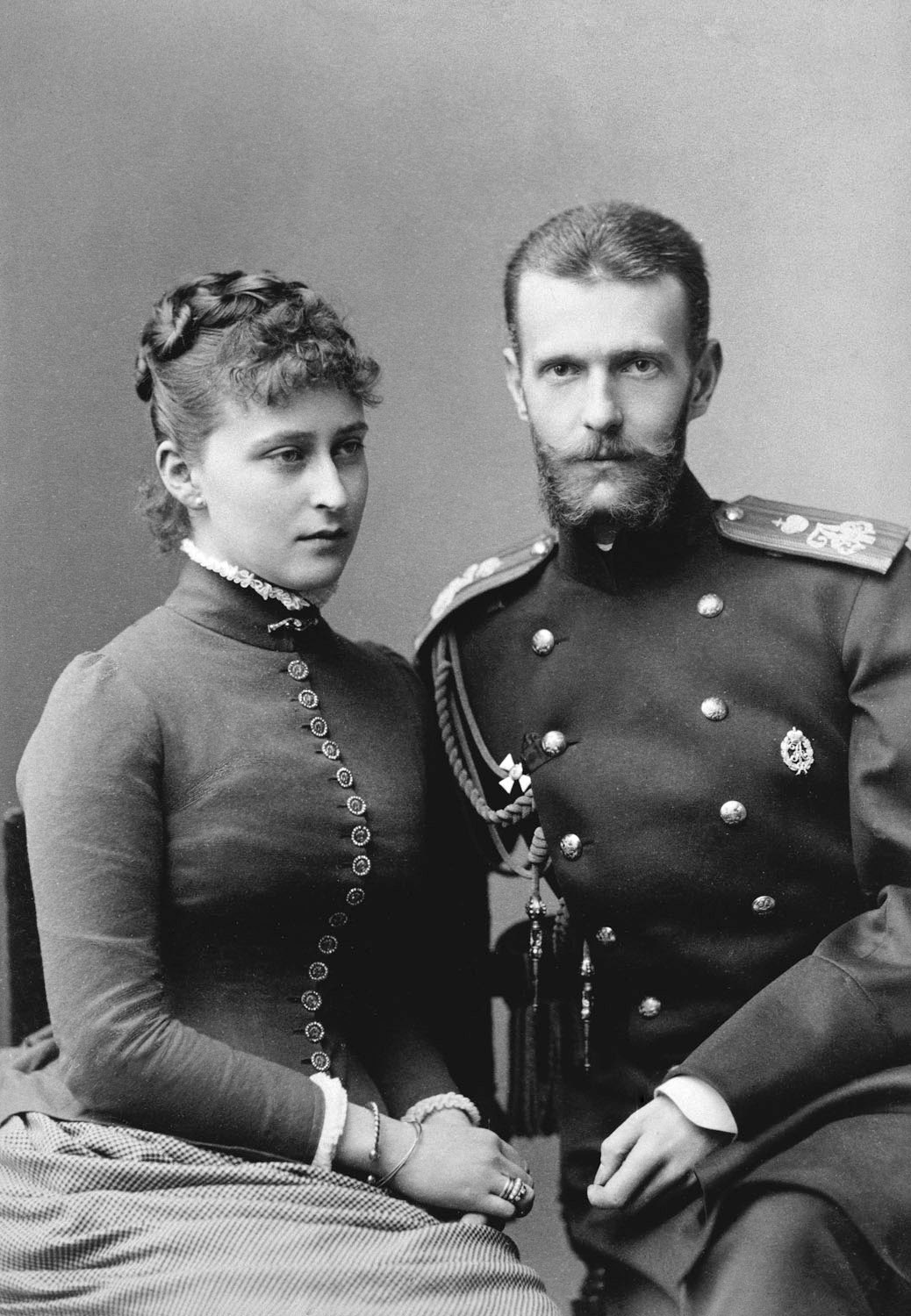
Elisabeth and her husband Sergei

Sergei and Elisabeth married on 15 June 1884, at the Chapel of the Winter Palace in Saint Petersburg. Upon her later conversion to Russian Orthodoxy, she took the name Elizaveta Feodorovna. It was at the wedding that Sergei's 16-year-old nephew, Tsarevich Nicholas, first met his future wife, Elisabeth's youngest surviving sister, Alix.

=== Grand Duchess of Russia ===
Elisabeth was not legally required to convert to Russian Orthodoxy from her native Lutheran religion, but she voluntarily chose to do so in 1891. Duchess Marie of Mecklenburg-Schwerin, Elisabeth's Lutheran sister-in-law who had not converted to Russian Orthodoxy, insisted that it was "a disgrace for a German Protestant princess to go over to the Orthodox faith". Kaiser Wilhelm II, who had once been in love with her, declared that she converted because of "an inordinate pursuit of popularity, a desire to improve her position at court, a great lack of intelligence, and also a want of true religiousness".

The new Grand Duchess made a good first impression on her husband's family and the Russian people. "Everyone fell in love with her from the moment she came to Russia from her beloved Darmstadt", wrote one of Sergei's cousins, Grand Duke Konstantin Konstantinovich of Russia (the poet KR). The couple settled in the Beloselsky-Belozersky Palace in St. Petersburg; after Sergei was appointed Governor-General of Moscow by his elder brother, Emperor Alexander III, in 1892, they resided in one of the Kremlin palaces. During the summer, they stayed at Ilyinskoye, an estate outside Moscow that Sergei had inherited from his mother.

The viceregal role of governor-general of Moscow was one that was answerable only to the emperor. Grand Duke Sergei was a political hardliner who shared his brother's inalienable belief in strong, nationalist government. Sergei's tenure began with the expulsion of Moscow's 20,000 Jews. It started four weeks before he arrived in person, after the publication of an imperial ukase by the Minister of the Interior Ivan Durnovo, by which all Jews of lower social stance (artisans, minor traders and so on) had to be expelled from Moscow. On 29 March, the first day of Passover, the city's Jewish population learned of the new decree that called for their expulsion. In three carefully planned phases over the next twelve months, Moscow's Jews were expelled. The first to go were the unmarried, the childless, and those who had lived in the city for less than three years. Next, it was the turn of apprentices, of families with up to four children, and those with less than six years residency. Last of all, it was the turn of the old Jewish settlers with large families and/or numerous employees, some of whom had lived in Moscow for forty years. Young Jewish women were made to register as prostitutes if they wanted to stay in the city.

During the expulsion in January 1892, homes were surrounded by mounted Cossacks in the middle of the night, with temperatures of −30 °C (−22 °F), while policemen ransacked every house. The Brest station was packed with Jews of all ages and sexes, all in rags and surrounded by meager remnants of households goods, all leaving voluntarily rather than face deportation. Sergei as governor-general was petitioned by the police commissioners to stop the expulsions until the weather conditions improved. While he agreed, the order was not published until the expulsions were over. Some of the expelled Jews moved to southern and western regions of the empire, although there were many who decided to emigrate abroad. As a result of the expulsion, Moscow lost 100 million rubles in trade and production, 25,000 Russians employed by Jewish firms lost their livelihoods, while the manufacture of silk, one of the city's most lucrative industries, was all but wiped out.

In 1891, Ella and Sergei's arrival in Moscow was marred by tragedy that September, not long after Paul and Alexandra arrived at Ilyinskoye to spend the late summer with them. One afternoon, the 21-year-old grand duchess Alexandra, who was seven months pregnant with her second child, followed the path down from the back of the house to the waiting small boat and suddenly collapsed. Her frantic husband, brother-and sister-in-law were helpless, and doctors were too far away. The midwife was called, and Alexandra gave birth to a tiny premature baby boy, but she died 6 days later. Alexandra's sudden death was crushing and an unbelievable blow to Paul, Sergei and Ella.

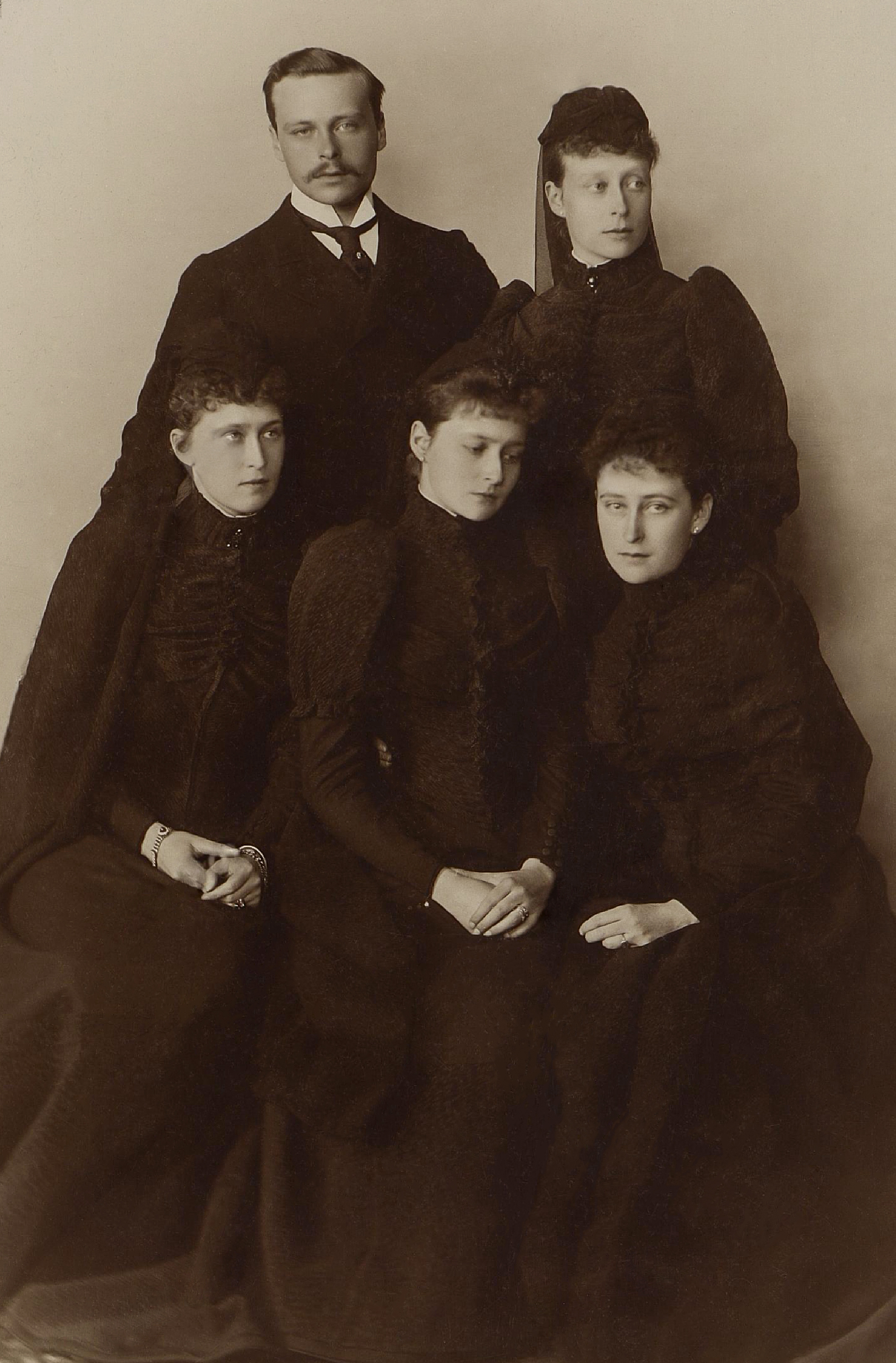
Hessian family in mourning

Worse news was soon to follow when, during the first week of March 1892, Grand Duke Louis suffered a paralytic stroke that brought his family hurrying to his bedside, Ernie, Alix, Victoria, and Irene. He raised his whole face off the pillow, put out his hand, and stroked Ella's face. On the evening of 13 March, he lapsed into a coma and died.

The couple never had children of their own, but their Ilyinskoye estate was usually filled with parties that Elisabeth organized especially for children. It was rumoured that their childlessness was due to Grand Duke Sergei's homosexual tendencies. They eventually became the foster parents of Grand Duke Dmitry Pavlovich and Grand Duchess Maria Pavlovna, Sergei's niece and nephew. Maria wrote in her memoirs about her aunt Ella: "she and my uncle seemed never very intimate. They met for the most part only at meals and by day avoided being alone together. They slept, however, up to the last year of their life together, in the same great bed." Maria and Dimitri resented their aunt and uncle, blaming them for the forced separation from their real father, who had abandoned them.

Elisabeth was instrumental in the marriage of her nephew-by-marriage, Emperor Nicholas II, to her youngest sister Alix. Much to the dismay of Queen Victoria, Elisabeth had been encouraging Nicholas, then tsarevich, in his pursuit of Alix. When Nicholas did propose to Alix in 1894, and Alix rejected him on the basis of her refusal to convert to Orthodoxy, it was Elisabeth who spoke with Alix and encouraged her to convert. When Nicholas proposed to her again, a few days later, Alix then accepted.

=== Assassination of Grand Duke Sergei ===
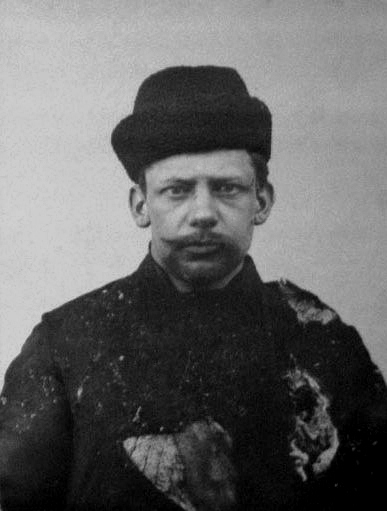
Photograph of Ivan Kalyayev taken just after the assassination. I threw the bomb from less than four steps. I was taken by the explosions, I saw the carriage flew to pieces... My overcoat was strewn with splinters of wood all around, it was torn and burnt, there was blood on my face...

On 15 February 1905, the family attended a concert at the Bolshoi Theatre in aid of Elizabeth Feodorovna's Red Cross War charities. A terrorist organization that knew the route, the Socialist Revolutionary Party's combat detachment, had planned to assassinate Sergei that day. However, one of their members, Ivan Kalyayev, noticed the children in the carriage and decided to call off their attack. To kill the Grand Duchess and the children would surely have sparked a wave of apprehension throughout the empire and would have set back the revolutionary cause by years. After lunching with his wife at Nicholas Palace on 17 February, Sergei left unaccompanied for the Governor General's mansion. Because of the looming threat, Sergei had refused to take his adjutant, Alexei, since he was married and a father. The arrival of the Grand Duke's recognizable carriage, drawn by a pair of horses and driven by his coachman Andrei Rudinkin, alerted the terrorist who had been waiting in the Kremlin with a bomb wrapped in newspapers.

Just before 14:45, the carriage of the Grand Duke passed through the gate of Nikolskaya Tower of the Kremlin and turned the corner of the Chudov Monastery into Senatskaya Square. From a distance no more than four feet (1.2 m) away and still some 60 feet (18 m) inside the Nikolsky Gate, Ivan Kalyayev stepped forward and threw a nitroglycerin bomb directly into Sergei's lap. The explosion disintegrated the carriage, and the Grand Duke died immediately. Scattered all over the bloodstained snow lay pieces of scorched cloth, fur, and leather. The body of the Grand Duke was mutilated, with the head, the upper part of the chest, and the left shoulder and arm blown off and completely destroyed. Some of the Grand Duke's fingers, still adorned with the rings he habitually wore, were found on the roof of a nearby building.

On impact, the carriage horses had bolted towards the Nikolsky Gate, dragging with them the front wheels and coachbox as well as the semi-conscious and badly burned driver, Rudinkin, whose back had been riddled with bits of bomb and stones. He was rushed to the nearest hospital, where he died three days later. Kalyayev, who by his own testimony had expected to die in the explosion, survived. Sucked into the vortex of the explosion, he ended up by the remains of the rear wheels. His face was peppered by splinters, pouring with blood. Kalyayev was immediately arrested, sentenced to death, and hanged two months later. The Grand Duchess rushed to the scene of the explosion. Stunned but perfectly controlled, she gave instructions, and, kneeling in the snow, helped to gather up Sergei's remains. The remains were placed on a stretcher and covered with an army greatcoat.

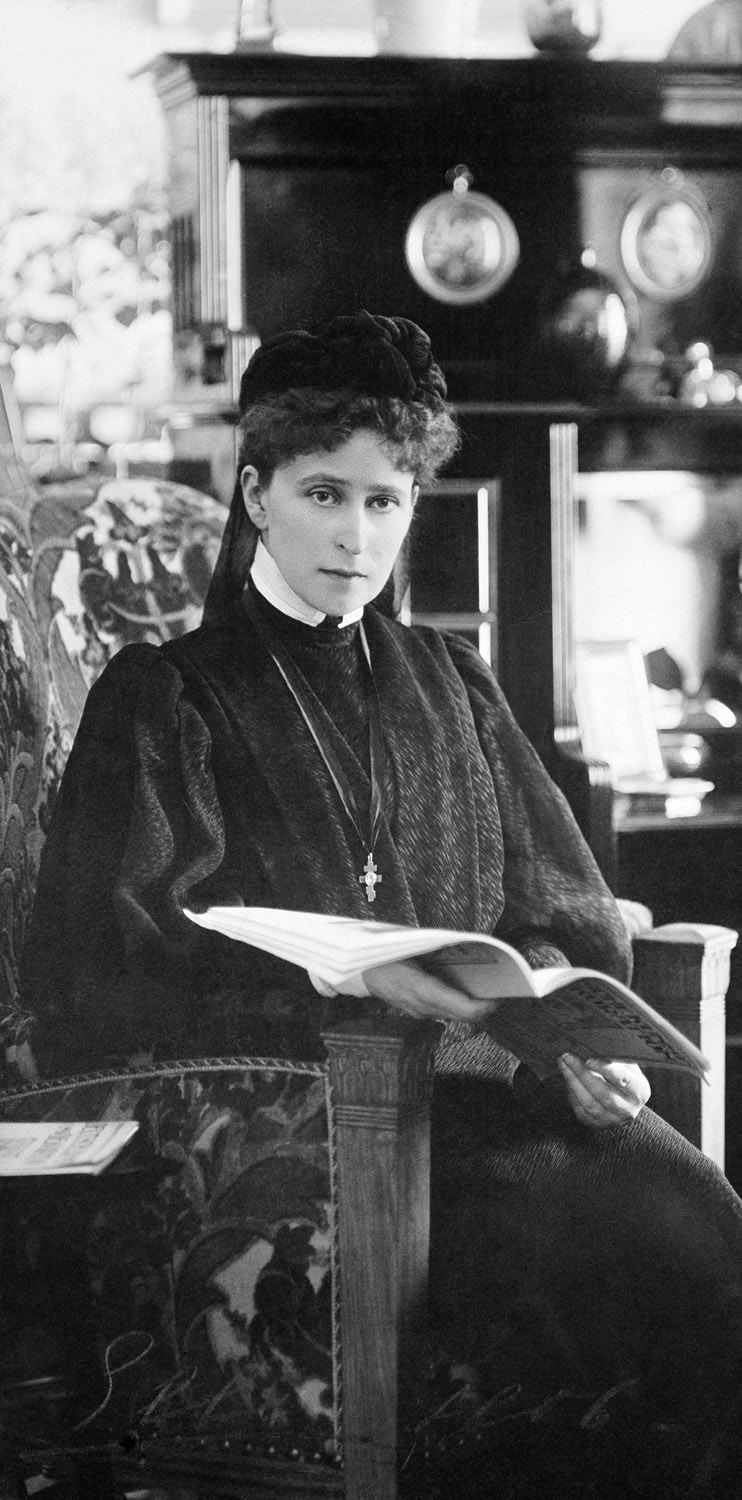
Grand Duchess Elizabeth in Mourning, 1906

According to Edvard Radzinsky,

Elizabeth spent all the days before the burial in ceaseless prayer. On her husband's tombstone she wrote: 'Father, release them, they know not what they do.' She understood the words of the Gospels heart and soul, and on the eve of the funeral she demanded to be taken to the prison where Kalyayev was being held. Brought into his cell, she asked, 'Why did you kill my husband?' 'I killed Sergei Alexandrovich because he was a weapon of tyranny. I was taking revenge for the people.' She replied, 'Do not listen to your pride. Repent... and I will beg the Sovereign to give you your life. I will ask him for you. I myself have already forgiven you.' On the eve of revolution, she had already found a way out; forgiveness! Forgive through the impossible pain and blood -- and thereby stop it then, at the beginning, this bloody wheel. By her example, poor Ella appealed to society, calling upon the people to live in Christian faith. 'No!' replied Kalyayev. 'I do not repent."

== Religious life ==
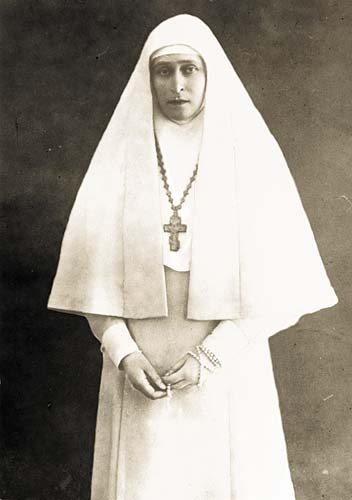
Grand Duchess Elizabeth Feodorovna as a nun after her husband's death

Deeply affected by the Grand Duke's death, Grand Duchess Elizabeth Feodorovna retired from the royal family and founded the Russian Orthodox convent of Martha and Mary, where she dedicated herself to the care of Moscow's poor and suffering. Part of the obligations of the sisters of the Martha and Mary convent was to make an annual pilgrimage to the sepulchral church in memory of the Grand Duke on the day of his repose, 4 February.

Elisabeth wore mourning clothes and became a vegetarian. In 1909, she sold off her magnificent collection of jewels and other luxurious possessions; even her wedding ring was not spared. With the proceeds, she opened the Convent of Saints Martha and Mary and became its abbess. She soon opened a hospital, chapel, pharmacy and orphanage on its grounds.

Elisabeth and her fellow nuns worked tirelessly among the poor and the sick of Moscow. She often visited Moscow's worst slums and did all she could to help alleviate the suffering of the poor. For many years, her institution helped the poor and the orphans in Moscow by fostering the prayer and charity of devout women.

On October 17, 1910, Grand Duchess Elizabeth took leave of her sisters and boarded her train en route for Germany. She arrived at Wolfsgarten for a cheerful reunion with the rest of the surviving family. Her ill health was aggravated by the high anxiety her sister, Alexandra, felt for her son from the first signs of hemophilia six weeks after his birth. From Moscow, Elizabeth had observed this mounting dependence with dismay. She knew all about Rasputin's true nature, and she had none of her sister's naive credulity. Soon after his acceptance by the imperial couple, rumours began to spread in St. Petersburg society that Rasputin had been a member of the Khlisti. Elizabeth warned Alexandra several times that the "holy man" was a fraud and a lecherous drunkard, but Alexandra would flatly refuse to believe her. In 1915, the All-Russian Zemstvo Union was organised under Elisabeth's auspices to provide support for sick and injured soldiers during the First World War.

In April 1916, Ella visited the dowager empress at the Anichkov palace where the talk was of nothing but the need to dispose of the peasant Rasputin. Frustration was reaching boiling point, and in the face of Alix's obstinacy, Ella knew that it could not be long before someone would be driven to act.

However, Elisabeth was worried about her relatives, who were under house arrest in the Alexander Palace in Tsarskoye Selo. She kept in touch with her sister Alexandra, even when she was in exile in Tobolsk, although under considerably more difficult conditions.

In 2010, a historian claimed that Elisabeth may have been aware that the murder of Rasputin was going to take place and secondly, she knew who was going to commit it when she wrote a letter and sent it to the emperor and the two telegrams to Grand Duke Dmitri Pavlovich and her friend Zinaida Yusupova. The telegrams, which were written the night of the murder, reveal that Elisabeth was aware of who the murderers were, before that information had been released to the public, and she stated that she felt that the killing was a "patriotic act".

== Death ==
In 1918, Vladimir Lenin ordered the Cheka to arrest Elisabeth. They then exiled her first to Perm, then to Yekaterinburg, where she spent a few days and was joined by others: the Grand Duke Sergei Mikhailovich; Princes John Konstantinovich, Konstantin Konstantinovich, Igor Konstantinovich and Vladimir Pavlovich Paley; Grand Duke Sergei's secretary, Fyodor Remez; and Varvara Yakovleva, a sister from the Grand Duchess's convent. They were all taken to Alapayevsk on 20 May 1918. There, they were accommodated in a stone building on the edge of the town, in Lenin Street where the Napolnaya School is located. On 21 June, a prison regime was implemented and all their property was confiscated.

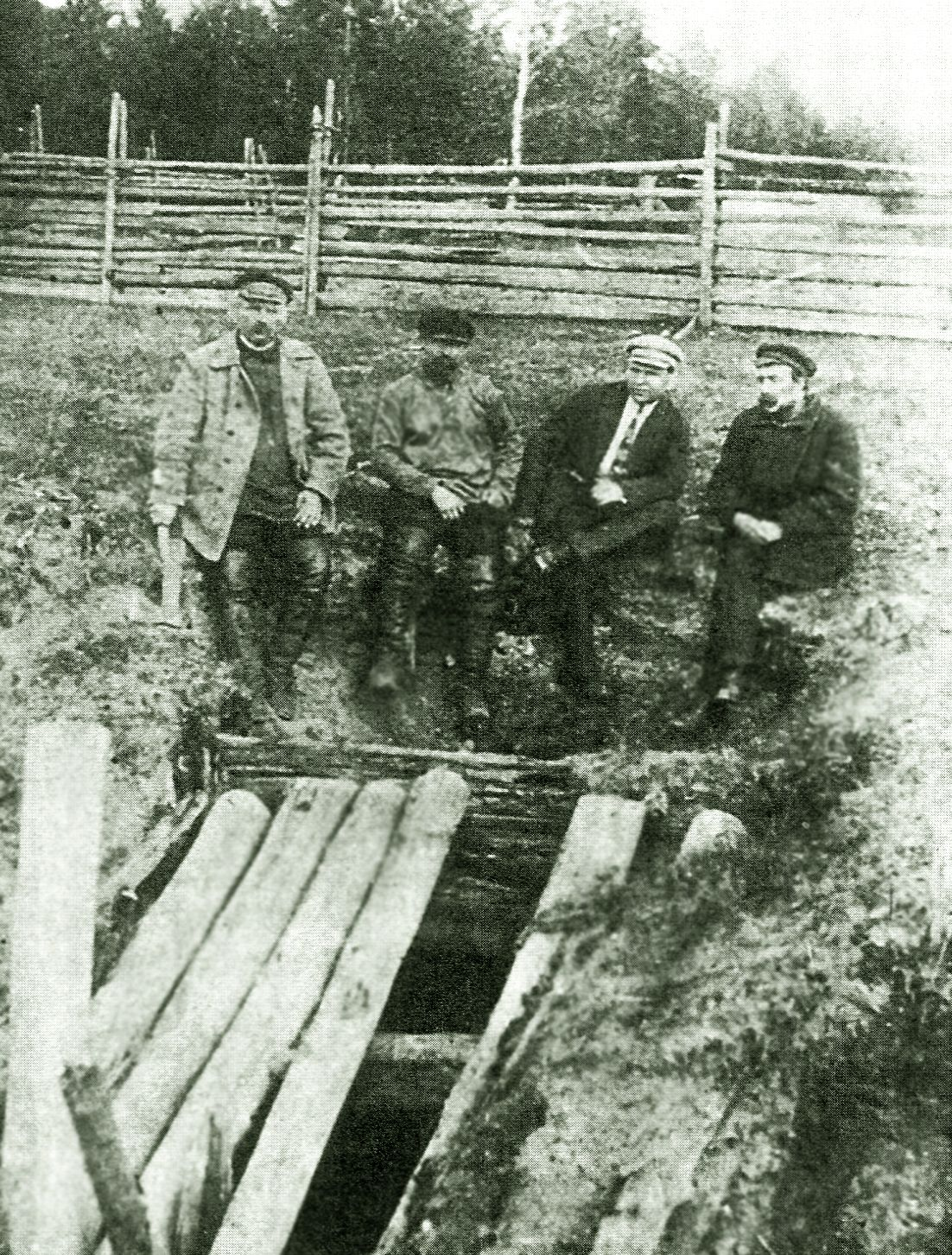
Mine shaft in Siniachikha where Elisabeth and her family were killed

At noon on 17 July, Cheka officer Pyotr Startsev and a few Bolshevik workers came to the school. They took from the prisoners whatever money they had left and announced that they would be transferred that night to the Upper Siniachikhensky factory compound. The Red Army guards were told to leave and Cheka men replaced them. That night the prisoners were awakened and driven in carts on a road leading to the village of Siniachikha, some 18 kilometres (11 miles) from Alapayevsk, where there was an abandoned iron mine with a pit 20 metres (66 feet) deep. Here they halted. The Cheka beat all the prisoners before throwing their victims into this pit, Elisabeth being the first. Ryabov tossed in a grenade after them and grenades were then hurled down the shaft.

Following the explosion, Ryabov claimed to have heard Elisabeth and the others singing an Orthodox hymn from the bottom of the shaft. Unnerved, Ryabov threw down a second grenade, but the singing continued. Finally a large quantity of brushwood was shoved into the opening and set alight, upon which Ryabov posted a guard over the site and departed.

Early on 18 July 1918, the leader of the Alapayevsk Cheka, Abramov, and the head of the Yekaterinburg Regional Soviet, Alexander Beloborodov, who had been involved in the execution of the Imperial Family, exchanged a number of telegrams in a pre-arranged plan saying that the school had been attacked by an "unidentified gang". A month later, Alapayevsk fell to the White Army of Admiral Alexander Kolchak. Lenin is said to have welcomed Elisabeth's death, remarking that "virtue with the crown on it is a greater enemy to the world revolution than a hundred tyrant tsars". Elisabeth's last words were: "Father, forgive them, for they know not what they do."

New research published in the book Крестный путь преподобномученицы Великой княгини Елисаветы Феодоровны на Алапаевскую Голгофу ("The Crucifixion Path of the Reverend Martyr Grand Duchess Elizabeth Feodorovna to the Alapaevsk Golgotha"), by Russian Orthodox Church historian Ludmila Kulikova in 2019, challenges the traditional life of a saint and the belief about Elisabeth during her time in the mine shaft. According to the original documents of the preliminary investigation in 1918 by investigator Nikolai Alekseevich Sokolov, Elizabeth's body was found "vertical, her arms on her body...both hands...tightly clenched, fingers bent, her nails sunk into the skin...head, eyes and nose were tied with a handkerchief folded in four layers". Thus, she could not have sung Orthodox hymns nor could she have bandaged the head of Prince John Konstantinovich as traditionally believed.

== Legacy and canonisation ==
Saint Elizabeth Romanova
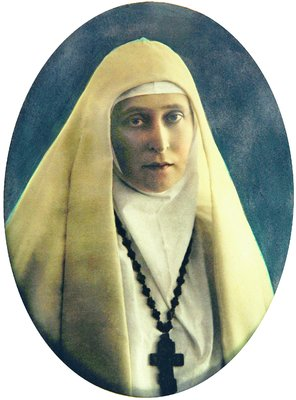

Holy Martyr
- Venerated in: Eastern Orthodox Church
- Canonized: 1981 by Russian Orthodox Church Abroad; 1992 by Russian Orthodox Church
- Major shrine: Martha and Mary Convent, Moscow, Russia.
- Feast: 18 July (O.S 5 July)
- Attributes: Religious habit
- Patronage: Russia

=== Fate of the remains and commemoration ===
On 8 October 1918, White Army soldiers discovered the remains of Elisabeth and her companions, still within the shaft where they had been killed. Despite having lain there for almost three months, the bodies were in relatively good condition. With the Red Army approaching, their remains were removed farther east and buried in the cemetery of the Russian Orthodox Mission in Peking (now Beijing), China. In 1921, the remains of Elisabeth and of Sister Barbara (Varvara Yakovleva), one of her nuns, were taken to Jerusalem, where they were laid to rest in the Church of Mary Magdalene at Gethsemane. Elisabeth was canonised by the Russian Orthodox Church Outside Russia in 1981, and in 1992 by the Russian Orthodox Church as Holy Martyr Elizabeth Feodorovna. Her principal shrines are the Marfo-Mariinsky Convent she founded in Moscow, and the Saint Mary Magdalene Convent on the Mount of Olives, which she and her husband helped build, and where her relics (along with those of Nun Barbara (Varvara Yakovleva, her former maid) are enshrined.

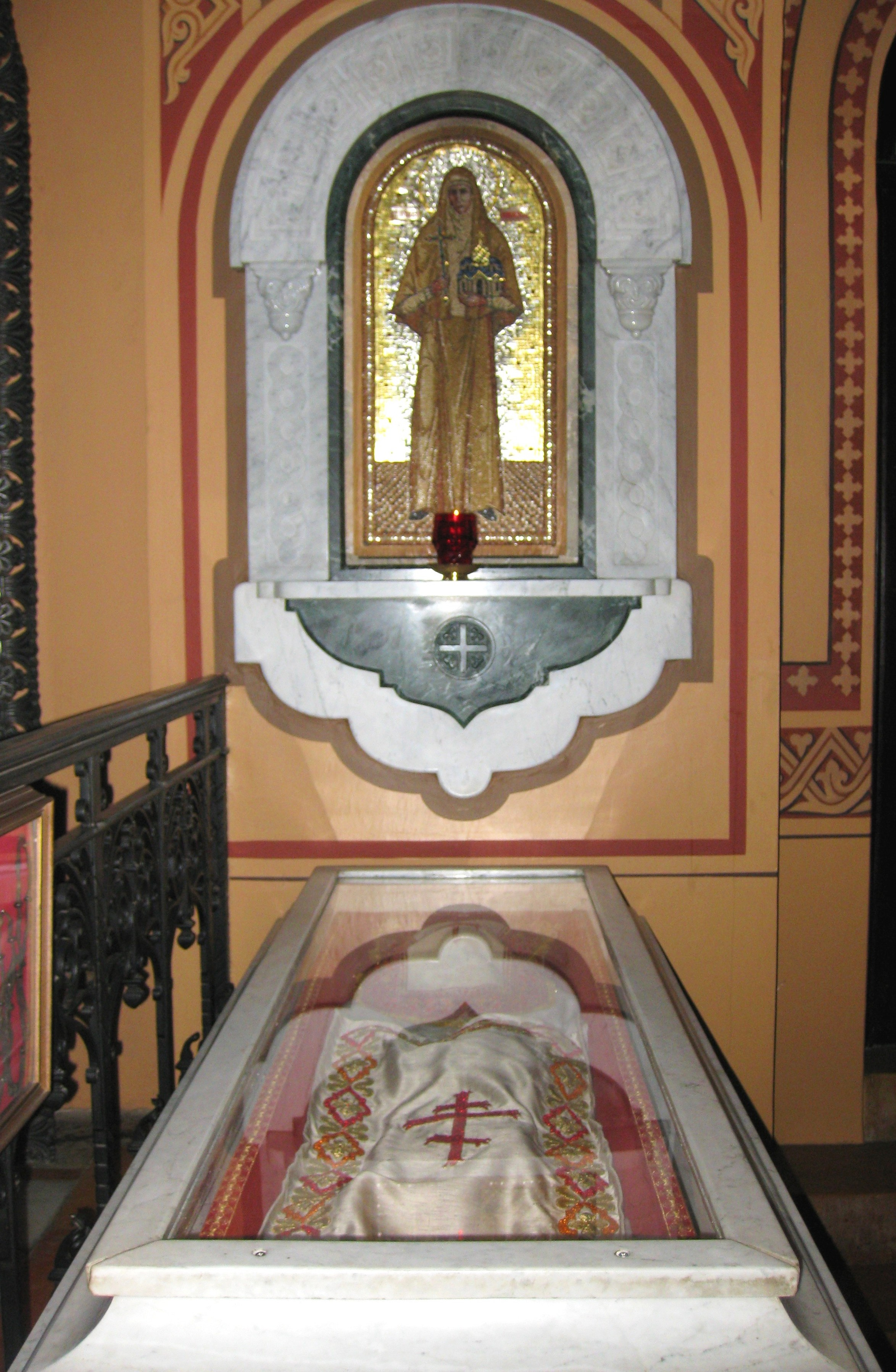
Tomb and mosaic icon of Princess Elizabeth

Saint Elizabeth the New Martyr is commemorated on three days in the liturgical year of the Russian Orthodox Church: on the feast day of the New Martyrs and Confessors of Russian Church (Sunday nearest 25 January (O.S.)/ 7 February (N.S.), on the anniversary of her martyrdom (5/ 18 July) and on the anniversary of the uncovering of her relics from the mine (28 September/ October 11). A fourth feast day, the anniversary of the transfer of her relics to Jerusalem (17/ 30 January), is commemorated on the ROCOR liturgical calendar. She is one of the ten 20th-century martyrs from across the world who are depicted in statues above the Great West Door of Westminster Abbey, London, England, and she is also represented in the restored nave screen installed at St Albans Cathedral in April 2015.

A statue of Elisabeth was erected in the garden of her convent in Moscow after the dissolution of the Soviet Union. Its inscription reads: "To the Grand Duchess Elizabeth Feodorovna: With Repentance".

=== Relics and rehabilitation ===
In 2004–2005, the relics of Saint Elizabeth were brought to Russia, the CIS and Baltic countries, where more than 7 million people came to venerate them. According to patriarch Alexei ll (1929–2008), "the long queues of believers to the relics of the holy new martyrs are another symbol of Russia's repentance for the sons of hard times, the country's return to its original historical path". The relics were subsequently returned to Jerusalem.

On 8 June 2009, the Prosecutor General of Russia officially posthumously rehabilitated Elizabeth Feodorovna, along with other Romanovs: Mikhail Alexandrovich, Sergei Mikhailovich, John Konstantinovich, Konstantin Konstantinovich, and Igor Konstantinovich. "All of these people were subjected to repression in the form of arrest, deportation and being held by the Cheka without charge", said a representative of the office.

== Honours ==
- Grand Duchy of Hesse: Dame of the Order of the Golden Lion, 1 January 1883
- Russian Empire: Dame Grand Cross of the Order of St. Catherine, 1884
- United Kingdom:
  - Queen Victoria Golden Jubilee Medal, 1887
  - Royal Order of Victoria and Albert, 2nd Class

== Ancestry ==
Ancestors of Princess Elisabeth of Hesse and by Rhine

8. Louis II, Grand Duke of Hesse and by, Rhine
4. Prince Charles of Hesse and by Rhine
9. Princess Wilhelmine of Baden
2. Louis IV, Grand Duke of Hesse and by Rhine
10. Prince Wilhelm of Prussia
5. Princess Elisabeth of Prussia
11. Landgravine Maria Anna of Hesse-Homburg
1. Grand Duchess Elizabeth Feodorovna of Russia
12. Ernest I, Duke of Saxe-Coburg and Gotha
6. Prince Albert of Saxe-Coburg and Gotha
13. Princess Louise of Saxe-Gotha-Altenburg
3. Princess Alice of the United Kingdom
14. Prince Edward, Duke of Kent and Strathearn
7. Queen Victoria of the United Kingdom
15. Princess Victoria of Saxe-Coburg-Saalfeld

== See also ==
- Canonization of the Romanovs

== Sources ==
- Barkowez, Olga (2001). Peterhof ist ein Traum. Deutsche Prinzessinnen in Russland (in German). Berlin: Fedor Fedorow, Alexander Krylow. ISBN 3861245329.
- Gelardi, Julia P. (2011). From Splendor to Revolution. St. Martin's Publishing Group. ISBN 978-1429990943.
- Röhl, John (1998). The Kaiser's Early Life, 1859-1888. Cambridge University Press. ISBN 0521497523.
- Marie (1930). Education of a princess: a memoir. Blue Ribbon Books, Newyork.
- Mager, Hugo (1998). Elizabeth: Grand Duchess of Russia. New York: Carroll & Graf. ISBN 0786705094.
- Warwick, Christopher (2014). The Life and Death of Ella Grand Duchess of Russia: A Romanov Tragedy. Albert Bridge Books. ISBN 978-1909771093.
- Warwick, Christopher (2007). Ella: Princess, Saint and Martyr. ISBN 978-0-470-87063-1.
- Millar, Lubov (2009). Elizabeth grand Duchess of Russia. ISBN 978-1-879066-11-3.
- Croft, Christina (2008). Most Beautiful Princess: A Novel Based on the Life of Grand Duchess Elizabeth of Russia. ISBN 978-0-9559853-0-0.
- Croft, Christina (2005). Ella: Grand Duchess Elisabeth of Russia. ASIN B003GXZKZ8.
- Perry, John (1999). The Flight Of The Romanovs: A Family Saga. ISBN 0465024629.
- Nelipa, Margarita (2010). The Murder of Grigorii Rasputin: A Conspiracy that Brought Down the Russian Empire. Gilbert's Books. ISBN 978-0986531019.
- Shlapentokh, Dmitry (1997). The French Revolution and the Russian Anti-Democratic Tradition: A Case of False Consciousness. ISBN 1560002441.
- Shelley, Gerard (1925). The Speckled Domes Episodes Of An Englishmans Life In Russai. OCLC 7535783.
- Radzinsky, Edvard (1993). The last tsar. Anchor Books. ISBN 978-0-385-46962-3.
- Packard, Jerrold (1998). Victoria's daughters. New York St. Martin's Griffin. ISBN 0-312-24496-7.
- Gilbert, Paul (2023). ELLA: Grand Duchess Elizabeth. Saint Elizabeth the New Martyr. ISBN 9798854710466.
- King, Greg (1994). The Last Empress: The Life and Times of Alexandra Feodorovna, Tsarina of Russia. ISBN 0806517611.
- Maylunas, Andrei; Mironenko, Sergei (1997). A Lifelong Passion: Nicholas and Alexandra Their Own Story Dukes. ISBN 0-385-48673-1.
- Lincoln, Bruce (1981). The Romanovs: Autocrats of All the Russias. ISBN 0-385-27908-6.
- Van der Kiste, John (1999). The Romanovs 1818–1959. ISBN 0-7509-2275-3.
- Miller, Illana (2011). The Russian Riddle: Grand Duke Serge Alexandrovich of Russia (1857-1905). ISBN 9780977196197.
