= Yakshino =

Yakshino Якшино
- Village
- Location within Vologda Oblast Location within Russia
- Coordinates: 60°49′N 37°21′E
- Country: Russia
- Region: Vologda Oblast
- District: Vytegorsky District
- Time zone: UTC+3:00

Yakshino (Russian: Якшино) is a rural locality (a village) in Saminskoye Rural Settlement, Vytegorsky District, Vologda Oblast, Russia. The population was 24 as of 2002. There are 2 streets.

== Geography ==
Yakshino is located 63 km southeast of Vytegra (the district's administrative centre) by road. Ryumino is the nearest rural locality.
