= Church of Mary Magdalene =

Russian Orthodox church building in East Jerusalem

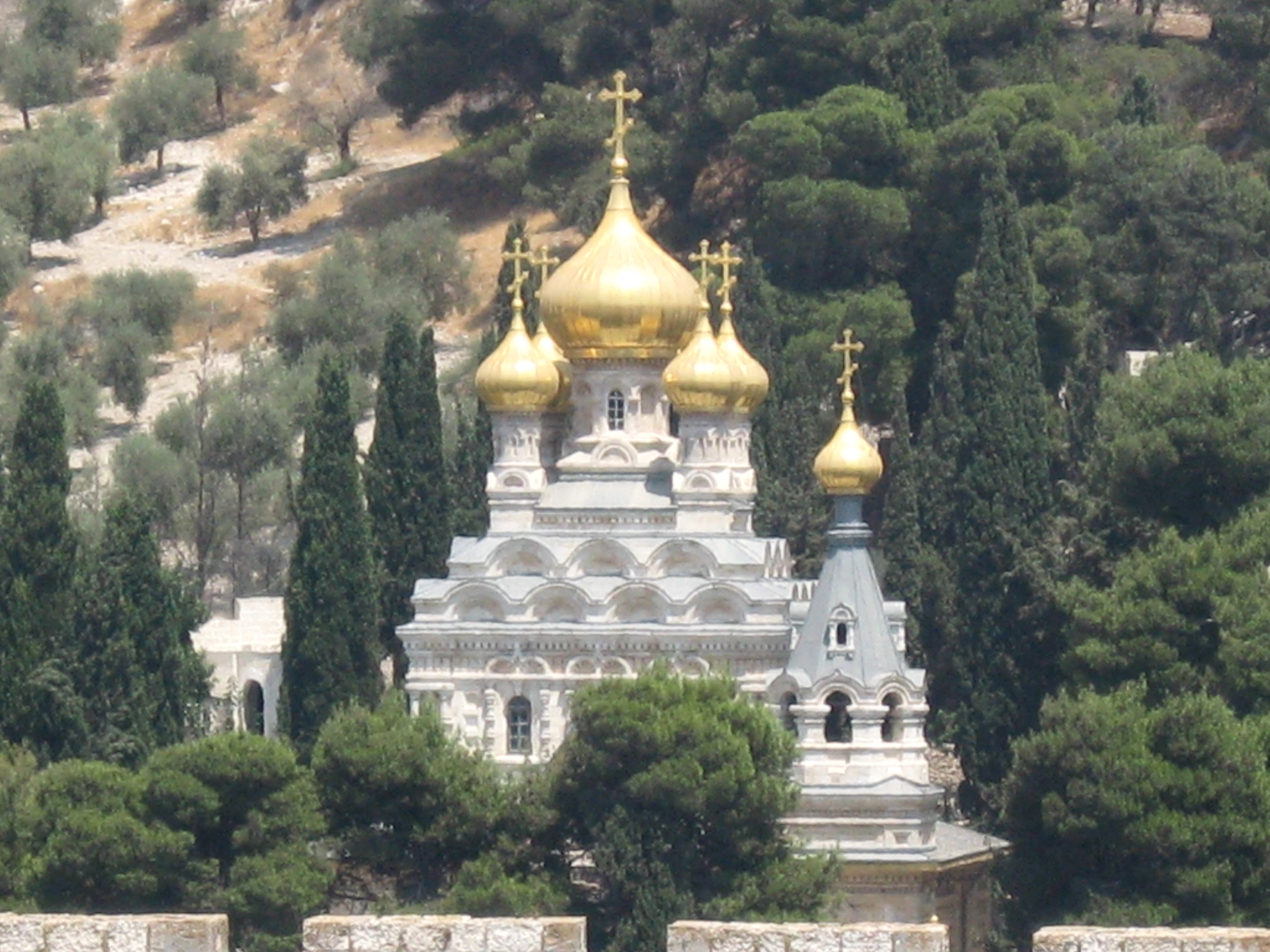
- Church of Mary Magdalene

Religion
- Affiliation: Orthodox Christian
- Year consecrated: 1888

Location
- Location: Jerusalem
- Interactive map of Church of Mary Magdalene
- Coordinates: 31°46′44″N 35°14′28″E

Architecture
- Architect: David Grimm
- Style: Russian Revival architecture
- Completed: 1888

Website
- russgefsimania.com

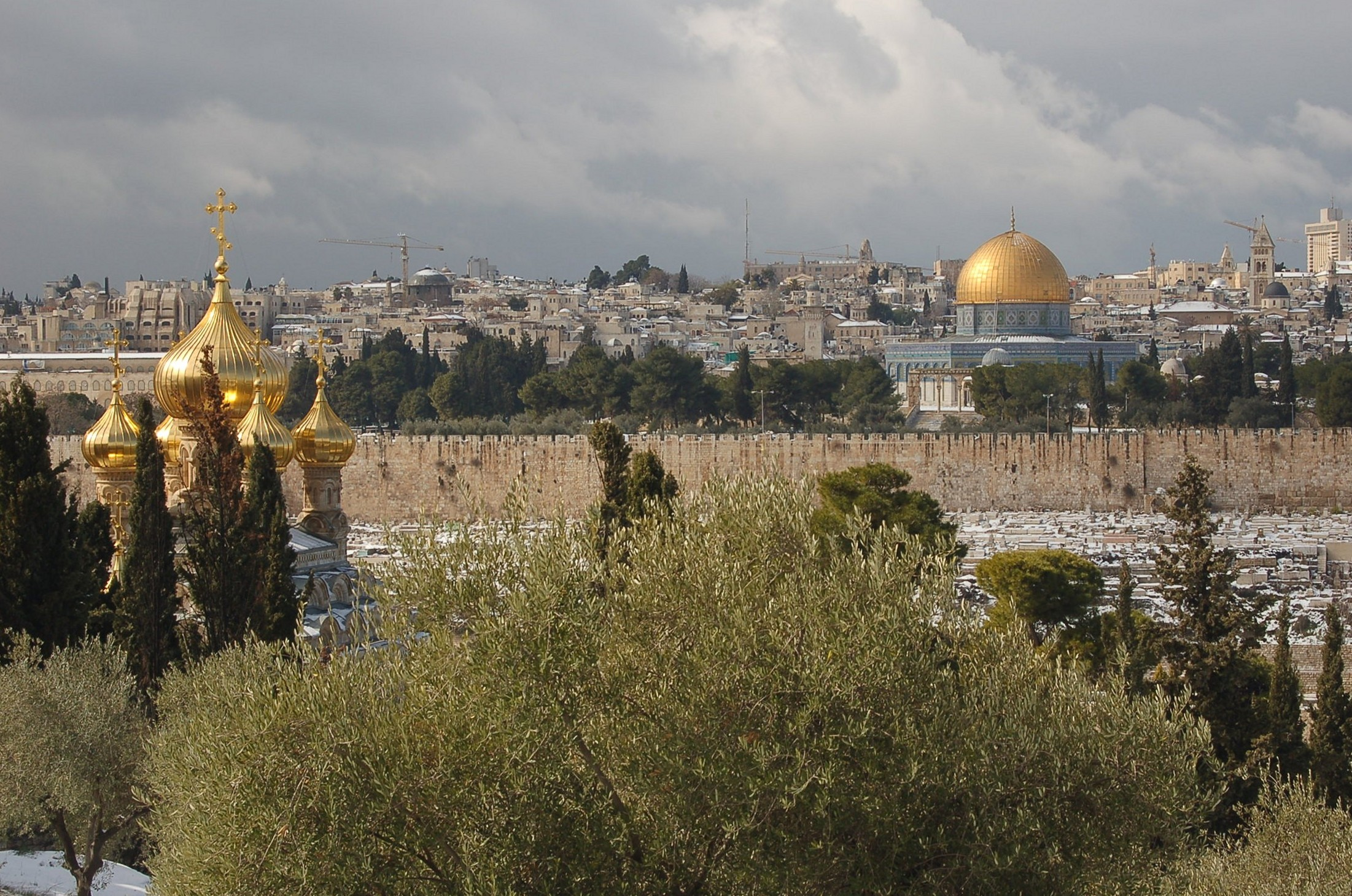
View towards Al-Masjid Al-Aqsa and other Jerusalem landscape.

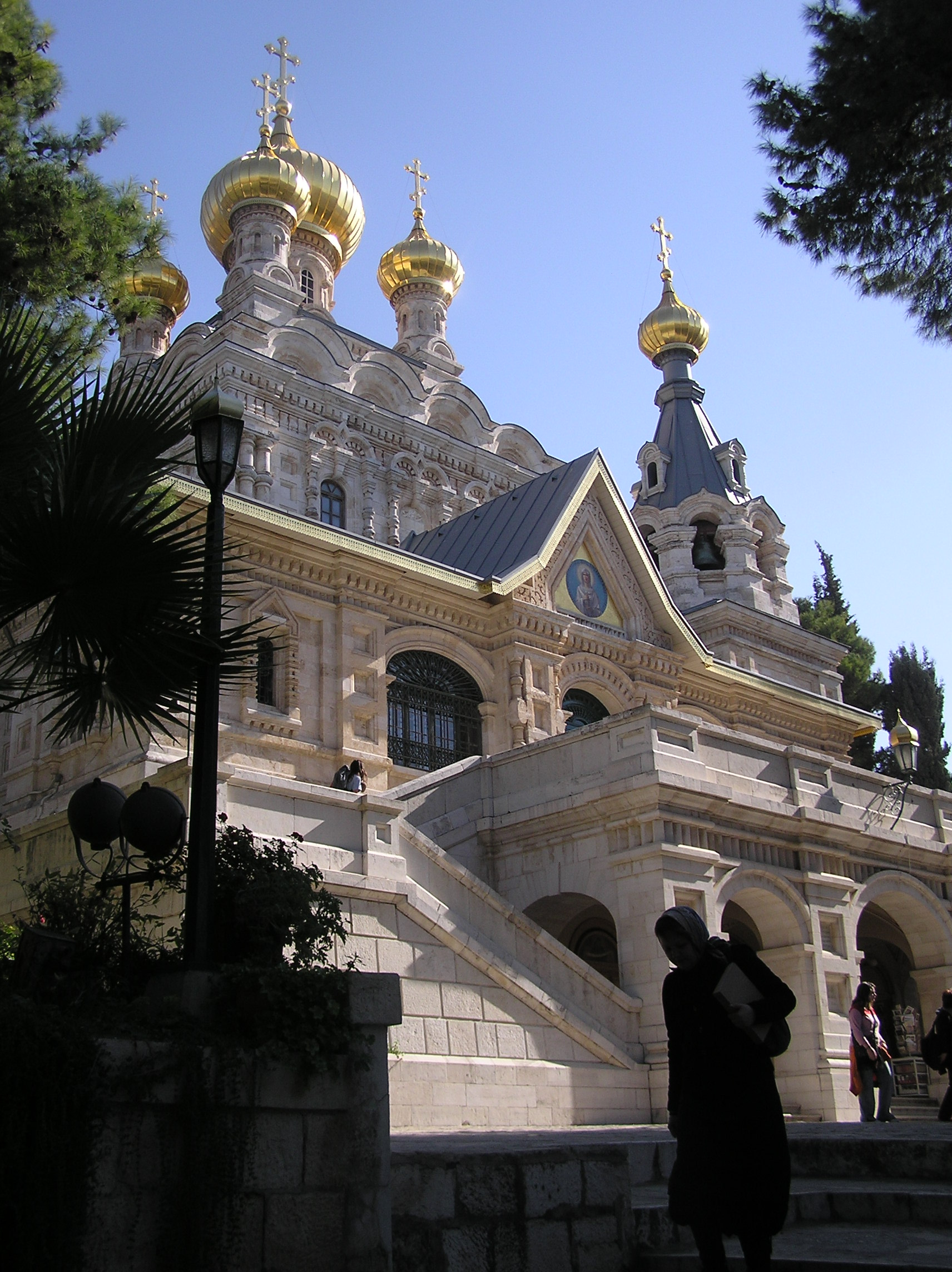
Entrance to the Church

The Church of Mary Magdalene (Russian: Церковь Святой Марии Магдалины; Arabic: كنيسة القديسة مريم المجدلية; Hebrew: כנסיית מריה מגדלנה) is an Eastern Orthodox Christian church located on the Mount of Olives, directly across the Kidron Valley and near the Garden of Gethsemane in Jerusalem.

The church, dedicated to Mary Magdalene, is part of the Convent of St. Mary Magdalene, a sisterhood established in 1936 by an English convert, and since the 1920s has been under the jurisdiction of the Russian Orthodox Church Outside Russia (ROCOR), an independent ecclesiastical entity until 2007 and part of the Moscow-based Russian Orthodox Church since then.

== History ==
=== Construction ===
The church was built in 1888 by Tsar Alexander III and his brothers to honour their mother, Empress Maria Alexandrovna of Russia. It was constructed to David Grimm's design in the traditional tented roof style popular in 16th- and 17th-century Russia, and includes seven distinctive, gilded onion domes.

=== Dedication ===
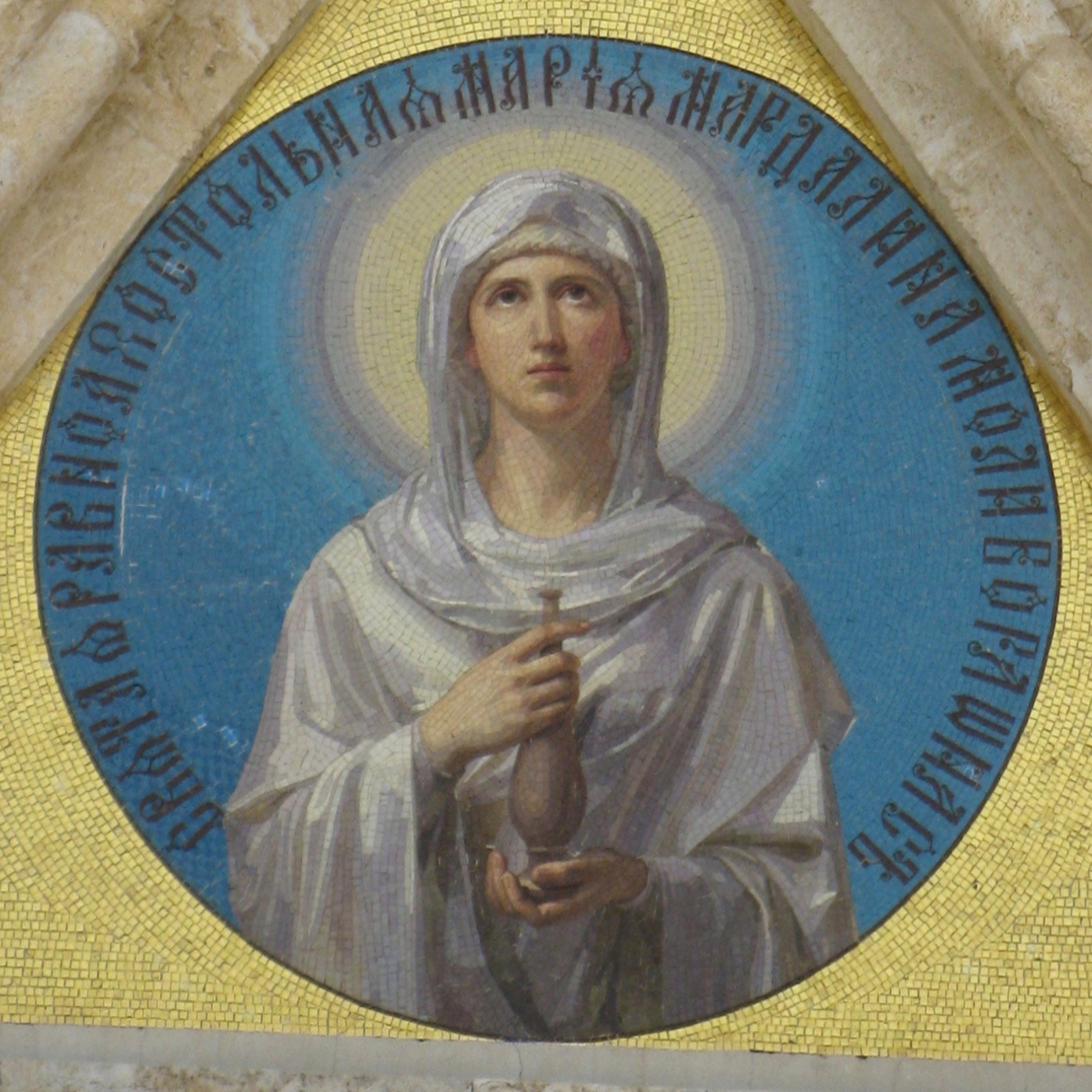
An icon of Saint Mary Magdalene in the church, the church's patron saint

The church is dedicated to Mary Magdalene, the disciple of Jesus, the Apostle of the Apostles. According to the sixteenth chapter of the Gospel of Mark, Mary Magdalene was the first to see Christ after his resurrection (Mark 16:9). She is usually considered a crucial and important disciple of Jesus, along with Mary of Bethany, whom some believe to have been the same woman.

=== Burials ===
==== Saints Elisabeth and Varvara ====
The relics of two martyred saints, Grand Duchess Elizabeth Feodorovna of Russia and her fellow nun Varvara Yakovleva, are displayed in the church.

In 1982, the New-York-based Russian Orthodox Church Outside Russia, which was at the time administratively independent of the Moscow-based Russian Orthodox Church, canonised the new martyrs of the communist revolution and in May the bodies of Elizabeth and Barbara (Varvara) were moved from the crypt, where only private veneration was possible, to the upper church of St. Mary Magdalene. Since 1981, Elizabeth and Barbara are venerated as "new martyrs" by the Orthodox Church in Exile at St. Mary Magdalene, Gethsemane. A statue of Elizabeth is among those of the 20th-century martyrs above the West Door of Westminster Abbey installed in 1998. In the changed political situation of the 1990s, the Moscow Patriarchate considered recognition of the martyrs of this period including the members of the royal family and her status as a saint was also recognized in April 1992 by the Moscow Patriarchate.

==== Princess Alice of Battenberg ====
In the 1930s, Princess Alice of Battenberg, mother of Prince Philip, Duke of Edinburgh, visited the church and asked to be buried near her aunt "Ella", the Grand-Duchess Elizabeth. In 1969, she died at Buckingham Palace. In 1988, her remains were transferred to a crypt below the church.

== See also ==
- Category:Burials at the Church of Mary Magdalene
- Russian Compound
- Russian Orthodox Church Outside Russia
- Russians in Israel
