= Branches of the House of Romanov =

Russian imperial family tree

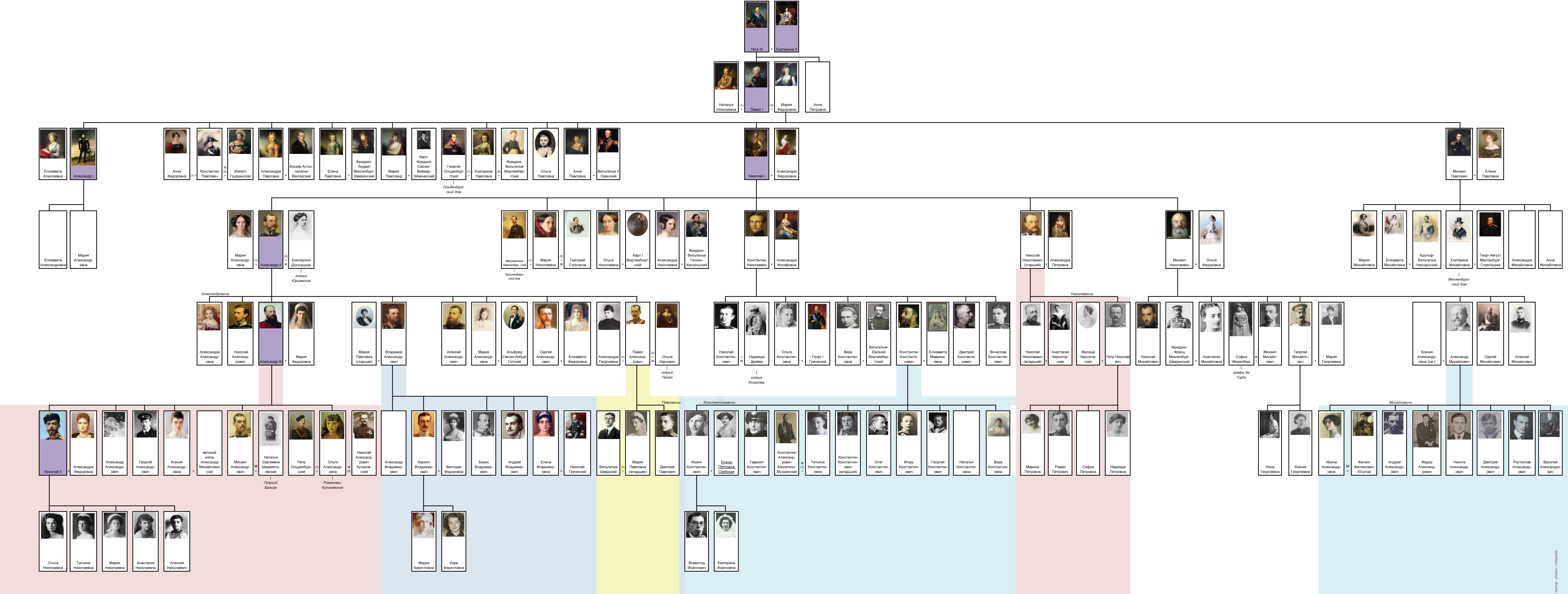

The Russian Imperial Family was split into four main branches named after the sons of Emperor Nicholas I:

- The Alexandrovichi (descendants of Emperor Alexander II of Russia) (with further subdivisions named The Vladimirovichi and The Pavlovichi after two of Alexander II’s younger sons)
- The Konstantinovichi (descendants of Grand Duke Constantine Nicholaevich of Russia)
- The Nikolaevichi (descendants of Grand Duke Nicholas Nikolaevich of Russia)
- The Mikhailovichi (descendants of Grand Duke Michael Nicolaevich of Russia)

The headship of the Imperial Family is in dispute between Grand Duchess Maria Vladimirovna of Russia of the Vladimirovich (Alexandrovichi) and Prince Andrew Andreevich of Russia of the Mikhailovichi branch.

In the family trees, a ≈ sign represents a union causing an illegitimate child.

== Alexandrovichi ==
- Emperor Nicholas I (1796-1855) ∞ Princess Charlotte of Prussia (1798-1860)
  - Emperor Alexander II (1818-1881) ∞ Princess Marie of Hesse (1824-1880)
    - Grand Duchess Alexandra Alexandrovna (1842-1849)
    - Tsarevich Nicholas Alexandrovich (1843-1865)
    - Emperor Alexander III (1845-1894) ∞ Princess Dagmar of Denmark (1847-1928)
      - Emperor Nicholas II (1868-1918) ∞ Princess Alix of Hesse (1872-1918)
        - Grand Duchess Olga Nikolaevna (1895-1918)
        - Grand Duchess Tatiana Nikolaevna (1897-1918)
        - Grand Duchess Maria Nikolaevna (1899-1918)
        - Grand Duchess Anastasia Nikolaevna (1901-1918)
        - Tsarevich Alexei Nikolaevich (1904-1918)
      - Grand Duke Alexander Alexandrovich (1869-1870)
      - Grand Duke George Alexandrovich (1871-1899)
      - Grand Duchess Xenia Alexandrovna (1875-1960) ∞ Grand Duke Alexander Mikhailovich (1866-1933)
        - see Mikhailovichi branch
      - Grand Duke Michael Alexandrovich (1878-1918) ∞ Natalia Sergeyevna Sheremetyevskaya (1880-1952) cr. Countess Brasova
        - George Mikhailovich, Count Brasov (1910-1931)
      - Grand Duchess Olga Alexandrovna (1882-1960) ∞ Duke Peter Alexandrovich of Oldenburg (1868-1924) div. ∞ Nikolai Alexandrovich Kulikovsky (1882-1958)
    - Grand Duchess Maria Alexandrovna (1853-1920) ∞ Prince Alfred, Duke of Saxe-Coburg and Gotha (1844-1900)
    - Grand Duke Sergei Alexandrovich (1857-1905) ∞ Princess Elizabeth of Hesse (1864-1918)

=== Vladimirovichi ===
- Emperor Nicholas I (1796-1855) ∞ Princess Charlotte of Prussia (1798-1860)
  - Emperor Alexander II (1818-1881) ∞ Princess Marie of Hesse (1824-1880)
    - Grand Duke Vladimir Alexandrovich (1847-1909) ∞ Duchess Marie of Mecklenburg-Schwerin (1854-1920)
      - Grand Duke Alexander Vladimirovich (1875-1877)
      - Grand Duke Cyril Vladimirovich (1876-1938) ∞ Princess Victoria Melita of Edinburgh (1875-1936)
        - Grand Duchess Maria Kirillovna, Princess of Leiningen (1907-1951) cr. Grand Duchess of Russia ∞ Friedrich Karl, Prince of Leiningen (1898-1946)
        - Princess Kira Kirillovna, Princess of Prussia (1909-1967) cr. Grand Duchess of Russia ∞ Prince Louis Ferdinand, Prince of Prussia (1907-1994)
        - Prince Vladimir Kirillovich (1917-1992) cr. Grand Duke of Russia ∞ Princess Leonida Bagration-Moukhransky (1914-2010)
          - Grand Duchess Maria Vladimirovna (b. 1953) ∞ Prince Franz Wilhelm of Prussia (b. 1943)cr. Grand Duke of Russia, div.
            - Grand Duke George Mikhailovich of Russia (b. 1981) ∞ Victoria Romanovna Bettarini (b. 1981) cr. Princess Romanoff
              - Prince Alexander Georgievich (b. 2022)
              - Princess Kira Leonida Georgievna (b. 2025)
      - Grand Duke Boris Vladimirovich (1877-1943) ∞ Zinaida Rashevskaya (1898-1963)
      - Grand Duke Andrei Vladimirovich (1879-1956) ∞ Mathilde Kschessinska (1872-1971) cr. Princess Romanovskya-Krassinskya
        - Prince Vladimir Romanovsky-Krasinsky (1902-1974)
      - Grand Duchess Elena Vladimirovna (1882-1957) ∞ Prince Nicholas of Greece and Denmark (1872-1938)

=== The Belevsky-Zhukovskys ===
- Emperor Nicholas I (1796-1855) ∞ Princess Charlotte of Prussia (1798-1860)
  - Emperor Alexander II (1818-1881) ∞ Princess Marie of Hesse (1824-1880)
    - Grand Duke Alexi Alexandrovich (1850-1908) ∞ Alexandra Zhukovskaya (1842-1899) cr. Baroness of Seggiano and Countess Zhukovsky
      - Count Aleksey Belevsky-Zhukovsky (1871-1931) cr. Count Belevsky-Zhukovsky ∞ Princess Maria Troubetskoya (1872-1954), div. ∞ Baroness Natalia von Schoeppingk
        - Countess Elisabeth Belevsky-Zhukovsky (1896-1972) ∞ Peter Perevostchikov (1872-1937), div. ∞ Arthur Lourié (1892-1966)
          - Maria Petrovna Perevostchikova (1917–1990) ∞ Lucien Teissier, div.
        - Countess Alexandra Belevskya-Zhukovskya (b.1892) ∞ Henry de Lepp (1896-1955) div. ∞ George Flevitzky (1904-1960)
        - Countess Maria Belevskya-Zhukovskya (1901-1996) ∞ Vladimir Sverbeev (1890-1951) ∞ Vladimir Ianouchevsky (1897-1970)
        - Count Sergei Belevsky-Zhukovsky (1903-1956) ∞ Nina Botkina (1901-1966)
          - Countess Elena Belevsky-Zhukovsky (b. 1929) ∞ Nikolai Mojaisky (b. 1928) div. ∞ Count Kirill von Nieroth (b. 1930)

=== Pavlovichi ===
- Emperor Nicholas I (1796-1855) ∞ Princess Charlotte of Prussia (1798-1860)
  - Emperor Alexander II (1818-1881) ∞ Princess Marie of Hesse (1824-1880)
    - Grand Duke Paul Alexandrovich (1860-1919) ∞ Princess Alexandra of Greece and Denmark (1870-1891)
      - Grand Duchess Maria Pavlovna (1890-1958) ∞ Prince Vilhelm, Duke of Södermanland (1884-1965)
      - Grand Duke Dmitri Pavlovich (1891-1941) ∞ Audrey Emery (1904-1971) cr. Princess Romanovskaya-Ilyinskaya
        - Prince Paul Dimitrievich Romanovsky-Ilyinsky (1928-2004) ∞ Mary Prince (b. 1925), ann. ∞ Angelica Kauffman (b. 1932)
          - Prince Dimitri Pavlovich Romanovsky-Ilyinsky (b. 1954) ∞ Martha McDowell (b. 1952)
            - Princess Catherine Romanovskaya-Ilyinskaya (b. 1981)
            - Princess Victoria Romanovskaya-Ilyinskaya (b. 1984)
            - Princess Lela Romanovskaya-Ilyinskaya (b. 1986)
          - Princess Paula Pavlovna Romanovskaya-Ilyinskaya (b. 1956) ∞ Mark Comisar (b. 1953)
          - Princess Anna Pavlovna Romanovskaya-Ilyinskaya (b. 1959) ∞ Robin de Young (b. 1952) div. ∞ David Wise Glossinger (b. 1953)
          - Prince Michael Pavlovich Romanovsky-Ilyinsky (b. 1961) ∞ Paula Maier (b. 1965) div. ∞ Lisa Schiesler (b. 1973) div. ∞ Debra Lewis
            - Princess Alexis Mikhailovna Romanovskaya-Ilyinskaya ( b. 1994)

==== The Paleys ====
- Emperor Nicholas I (1796-1855) ∞ Princess Charlotte of Prussia (1798-1860)
  - Emperor Alexander II (1818-1881) ∞ Princess Marie of Hesse (1824-1880)
    - Grand Duke Paul Alexandrovich (1860-1919) ∞ Olga Karnovitch (1866-1929) cr. Princess Paley
      - Prince Vladimir Pavlovich Paley (1897-1918)
      - Princess Irina Pavlovna Paley (1903-1990) ∞ Prince Feodor Alexandrovich (1898-1968) (Mikhailovichi branch) div. ∞ Count Hubert de Monbrison (1892-1982)
      - Princess Natalia Pavlovna Paley (1905-1981) ∞ Lucien Lelong (1889-1958) div. ∞ John Chapman Wilson (1889-1961)

==== The Yurievskys ====
- Emperor Nicholas I (1796-1855) ∞ Princess Charlotte of Prussia (1798-1860)
  - Emperor Alexander II (1818-1881) ∞ Princess Catherine Dolgorukaya (1847-1922) cr. Princess Yurievska
    - Prince George Alexandrovich Yurievsky (1872-1913) ∞ Countess Alexandra of Zarnekau (1883-1957) div.
      - Prince Alexander Georgijevich Yurievsky (1900-1988) ∞ Beer Ursule de Grüneck (1925-2001)
        - Prince George Alexandrovich Yurievsky (b. 1961) ∞ Katharina Verhagen (b. 1964) - div. 04/2012 ∞ Elikonida Silvia Trumpp (b. 1968) - married 08/2013
    - Princess Olga Alexandrovna Yurievskaya (1873-1925) ∞ Count Georg of Merenberg (1871-1948)
    - Prince Boris Alexandrovich Yurievsky (1876-1876)
    - Princess Catherine Yurievskaya (1878-1959) ∞ Prince Alexander Bariatinsky (1870-1910) ∞ Prince Serge Obolensky (1890-1978) div.

== Konstantinovichi ==
- Emperor Nicholas I (1796-1855) ∞ Princess Charlotte of Prussia (1798-1860)
  - Grand Duke Constantine Nicholaevich (1827-1892) ∞ Princess Alexandra of Saxe-Altenburg (1830-1911)
    - Grand Duke Nicholas Konstantinovich (1850-1918) ∞ Nadedja Alexandrovna von Dreyer (1861-1929)
      - Prince Artemy Nikolaevich Iskander (1883-1919)
      - Prince Alexander Nikolaevich Iskander (1889-1957) ∞ Olga Rogowska (1893-1962), div.
        - Prince Kyrill Alexandrovich Iskander (1915-1992)
        - Princess Natalja Alexandrovna Iskander (1917-1999) ∞ Nikolai Dostal
    - Grand Duchess Olga Konstantinovna (1851-1926) ∞ George I of Greece (1845-1913)
    - Grand Duchess Vera Konstantinovna (1854-1912) ∞ Duke Eugen of Württemberg (1846-1877)
    - Grand Duke Konstantin Konstantinovich (1858-1915) ∞ Princess Elisabeth of Saxe-Altenburg (1865-1927)
      - Prince Ioann Konstantinovich (1886-1918) ∞ Princess Helen of Serbia (1884-1962)
        - Prince Vsevelod Ivanovich (1914-1973) ∞ Lady Mary Lygon (1910-1982) cr. Princess Romanovskaya-Pavlovskaya div. ∞ Emilia de Gosztonyi (1914-1993) cr. Princess Romanovskaya, div. ∞ Valli Knust (1930-2012) cr. Princess Romanovskaya-Knust
        - Princess Ekaterina Ivanovna (1915-2007) ∞ Ruggero, Marchese Farace di Villaforesta (1909-1970)
      - Prince Gavriil Konstantinovich (1887-1955) cr. Grand Duke of Russia ∞ = Antonia Nesterovskya (1890-1950) ∞ Princess Irina Kurakina (1903-1993)
      - Princess Tatiana Konstantinovna (1890-1979) ∞ Prince Konstantin Bagration-Mukhransky (1889 -1915) ∞ Alexander Korochenzov (1877-1922)
      - Prince Konstantine Konstantinovich (1891-1918)
      - Prince Oleg Konstantinovich (1892-1914)
      - Prince Igor Konstantinovich (1894-1918)
      - Prince Georgi Konstantinovich (1903-1938)
      - Princess Natalia Konstantinovna (1905-1905)
      - Princess Vera Konstantinovna (1906-2001)
    - Grand Duke Dimitri Konstantinovich (1860-1919)
    - Grand Duke Vyacheslav Konstantinovich (1862-1879)

== Nikolaevichi ==
- Emperor Nicholas I (1796-1855) ∞ Princess Charlotte of Prussia (1798-1860)
  - Grand Duke Nicholas Nikolaevich (1831-1891) ∞ Princess Alexandra of Oldenburg (1838-1900)
    - Grand Duke Nicholas Nikolaevich (1856-1929) ∞ Princess Anastasia of Montenegro (1868-1935)
    - Grand Duke Peter Nikolaevich (1864-1931) ∞ Princess Milica of Montenegro (1866-1951)
      - Princess Marina Petrovna (1892-1981) ∞ Prince Alexander Galitzine (1885-1974)
      - Prince Roman Petrovich (1896-1978) ∞ Countess Prascovia Cheremeteva (1901-1980)
        - Prince Nicholas Romanovich (1922-2014) ∞ Countess Sveva della Gherardesca (1930-2026)
          - Princess Natalia Nikolaievna (b. 1952) ∞ Giuseppe Consolo (b. 1948)
            - Nicoletta Romanoff (b. 1979)
          - Princess Elizabeth Nikolaievna (b. 1956) ∞ Mauro Bononcini (b. 1950)
          - Princess Tatiana Nikolaievna (b. 1961) ∞ Giambattista Alessandria (b. 1958) div. ∞ Giancarlo Tirotti (b. 1947)
        - Prince Dimitri Romanovich (1926-2016) ∞ Johanna von Kauffmann (1936-1989) ∞ Dorrit Reventlow (b. 1942)
      - Princess Nadejda Petrovna (1898-1988) ∞ Prince Nikolai Orlov (1896-1961)
        - Princess Irina Nikolaïevna (1918-1989)
          - Elizabeth Baroness von Waldstatten (b. 1944)
          - Alexis Nicolas Orlov (b. 1947)
        - Princess Xenia Nikolaievna (1921-1963)
      - Princess Sofia Petrovna (1898-1898)

== Mikhailovichi ==
- Emperor Nicholas I (1796-1855) ∞ Princess Charlotte of Prussia (1798-1860)
  - Grand Duke Michael Nicolaevich (1832-1909) ∞ Princess Cecily of Baden (1839-1891)
    - Grand Duke Nicholas Mikhailovich (1859-1919)
    - Grand Duchess Anastasia Mikhailovna (1860-1922) ∞ Grand Duke Friedrich Franz III of Mecklenburg-Schwerin (1851-1897)
    - Grand Duke Michael Mikhailovich (1861-1929) ∞ Countess Sophie of Merenberg (1868-1927) cr Countess de Torby
      - Countess Anastasia de Torby (1892-1977) ∞ Sir Harold Augustus Wernher (1893-1973)
      - Countess Nadejda de Torby (1896-1963) ∞ George Mountbatten, 2nd Marquess of Milford Haven (1892-1938)
      - Count Michael de Torby (1898-1959)
    - Grand Duke George Mikhailovich (1863-1919) ∞ Princess Maria of Greece and Denmark (1876-1940)
      - Princess Nina Georgievna (1901-1974) ∞ Prince Paul Chavchavadze (1899-1971)
      - Princess Xenia Georgievna (1903-1965) ∞ William Bateman Leeds (1902-1971) ∞ Herman Jud (1911-1981)
    - Grand Duke Alexander Mikhailovich (1866-1933) ∞ Grand Duchess Xenia Alexandrovna (Alexandrovichi) (1875-1960)
      - Princess Irina Alexandrovna (1895-1970) ∞ Prince Felix Yussupov (1887-1967)
      - Prince Andrei Alexandrovich (1897-1981) ∞ Elisabetta dei duchi di Sasso-Ruffo dei principi di Sant' Antimo (d. 1940) ∞ Nadine McDougall (1908–2000)
        - Princess Xenia Andreevna (1919-2000) ∞ Calhoun Ancrum (1915-1990) div. ∞ Geoffrey Tooth (1908-1998)
        - Prince Michael Andreevich (1920-2008)
        - Prince Andrew Andreevich (1923-2021) ∞ Elena Konstantinovna Durneva (1928–1993) div. ∞ Kathleen Norris (1935–1967) ∞ Inez Storer (b. 1933)
          - Prince Alexis Andreevich (b. 1953) ∞ Zoetta Leisy (b. 1956)
          - Prince Peter Andreevich (b. 1961) ∞ Barbara Jurgenon (b. 1968)
          - Prince Andrew Andreevich (b. 1963) ∞ Elisabeth Flores (b. 1964)
            - Princess Natasha Andreevna (b. 1993)
        - Princess Olga Andreevna (b. 1950) ∞ Thomas Mathew (b. 1945) div
      - Prince Feodor Alexandrovich (1898-1968) ∞ Princess Irina Paley (1903-1990) div.
        - Prince Michael Feodorovich (1924-2008) ∞ Helga Staufenberger (b. 1926) div.
          - Prince Michael Mikhailovich (1959-2001) ≈ Maria de las Mercedes Ustrell-Cabani (b. 1960)
            - Tatiana Alexandra Romanoff (b. 1986)
        - Princess Irene Feodorvna (b. 1934) ∞ Andre Jean Pelle (b. 1923) div. ∞ Victor-Marcel Soulas (b. 1938) div.
      - Prince Nikita Alexandrovich (1900-1974) ∞ Countess Maria Vorontzova-Daschkova (1903-1997)
        - Prince Nikita Nikitich (1923-2007) ∞ Jane Anna Schoenwald (1933-2017)
          - Prince Feodor Nikitich (1974-2007)
        - Prince Alexander Nikitich (1929-2002) ∞ Maria Valguarnera di Niscemi (b. 1931)
      - Prince Dmitri Alexandrovich (1901-1980) ∞ Countess Marina Golenistcheva-Koutouzova (1912-1969) div.
        - Princess Nadeshda Dmitrievna (1933-2002) ∞ Anthony Brian Allen (b. 1931) div. ∞ William Thomas Hall Clark (1924-1995)
      - Prince Rostislav Alexandrovich (1902-1978)
        - Prince Rostislav Rostislavovich (1938-1999) ∞ Stephena Verdel Cook ∞ Christia Ipsen (b. 1949)
          - Princess Stephena Rostislavovna (b. 1963)
          - Princess Alexandra Rostislavovna (b. 1983)
          - Prince Rostislav Rostislavovich (b. 1985) ∞ Foteini Georganta (b. 1980)
            - Rostislav Romanov (b. 2013) (born out of wedlock, legitimized by parent's subsequent marriage but not accorded the title of Prince)
          - Prince Nikita Rostislavovich (b. 1987)
        - Prince Nicholas Rostislavovich (1945-2000) ∞ Pamela Kuzinowski (b. 1944) div.
          - Prince Nicholas Nicolaevich (b. 1968) ∞ Lisa Marie Flowa (b. 1971)
            - Cory Nicolaevich (1994-1998) (born out of wedlock, legitimized by parent's subsequent marriage but not accorded the title of Prince)
            - Karlyn Nicolaievna (b. 2000)
            - Chelle Nicolaievna (b. 2003)
          - Prince Daniel Nicolaevich (b. 1972) ∞ Soo Kim (b. 1971)
            - Madison Danielievna (b. 2007)
            - Jackson-Daniel Danielevich (b. 2009)
          - Princess Heather Nicolaievna (b. 1976) ∞ Joseph Munao (b. 1976)
      - Prince Vasili Alexandrovich (1907-1989) ∞ Princess Natalia Galitzine (1907-1989)
        - Princess Marina (b. 1940) ∞ William Beadleston (b. 1938) div.
    - Grand Duke Sergei Mikhailovich (1869-1918)
    - Grand Duke Alexei Mikhailovich (1875-1895)

== See also ==
- House of Romanov
- Romanov Family Association
