= Prince Rostislav Romanov (born 1985) =

Russian prince (born 1985)

Prince Rostislav of Russia
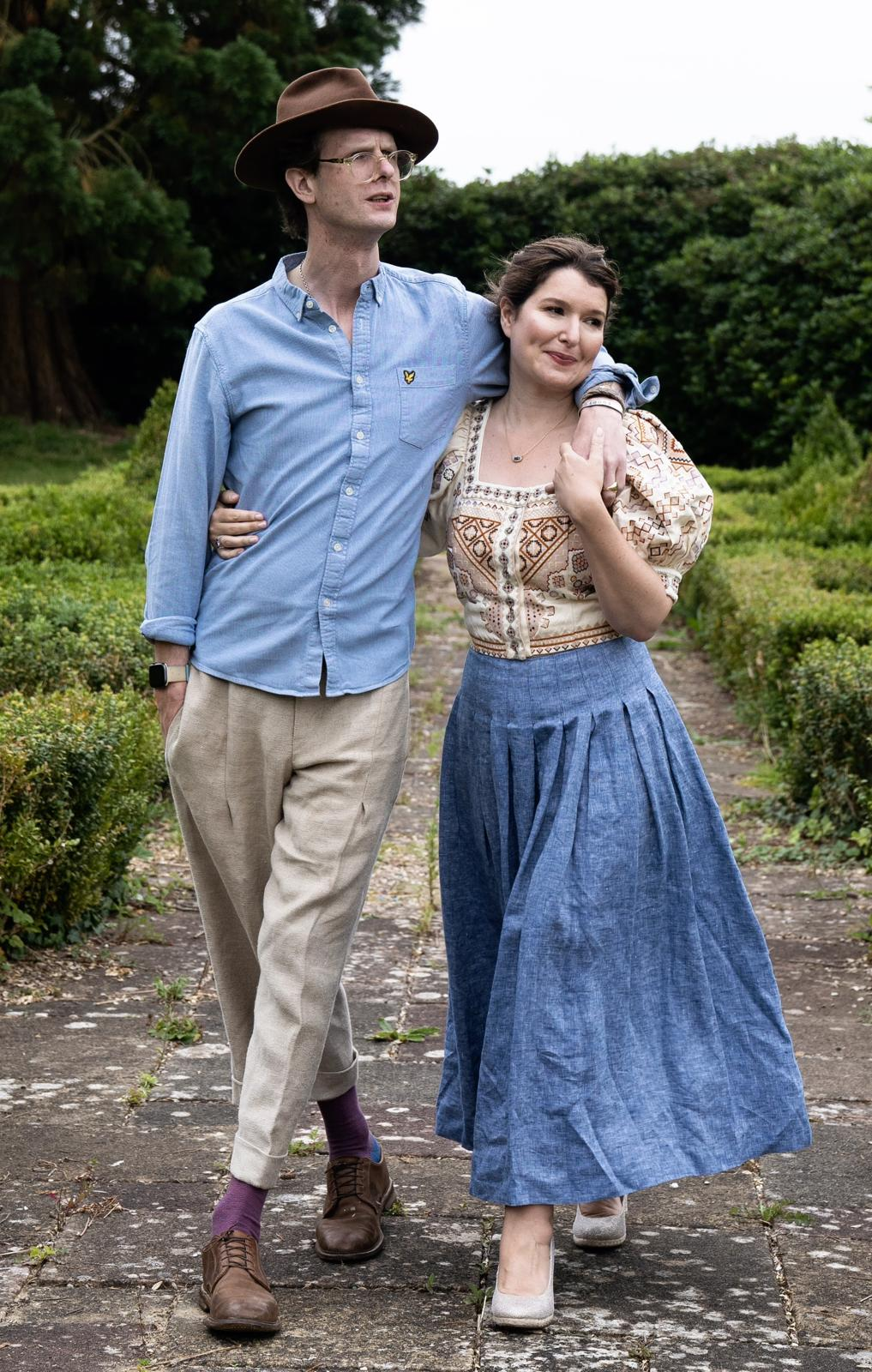
- Prince and Princess Rostislav of Russia
- Born: 21 May 1985 (age 41); Lake Forest, Illinois, U.S.
- Spouse: Foteini Maria Christina Georganta (m. 2021)
- Issue: Rostislav Romanov (b. 2013)
Names
- Rostislav Rostislavovich Romanov
- House: Holstein-Gottorp-Romanov
- Father: Prince Rostislav Rostislavovich Romanov
- Mother: Christia Ipsen
- Religion: Russian Orthodox Church
- Education: Falmouth University

Prince Rostislav Rostislavovich Romanov (Russian: Ростисла́в Ростисла́вович Рома́нов; born 21 May 1985) is an American-Russian painter and member of the House of Romanov, the former Russian imperial family. As none of the sons of Prince Andrew Romanov have male offspring, Rostislav is third in line to inherit their claim to the Russian throne.

== Early life ==
Romanov was born in Lake Forest, Illinois in 1985 as the second child and eldest son of Prince Rostislav Rostislavovich Romanov (1938–1999) and his wife, future Lady Ampthill (b. 1949).

== Education ==
Rostislav was educated at Brambletye and Milton Abbey Schools, and at Falmouth University, where he graduated with a BA in fine art.

== Work ==
Rostislav is a landscape artist. He is particularly interested in en plein air painting and much of his artwork depicts the Sussex countryside or is inspired by his travels in Russia and elsewhere. He works primarily with oil and creates sculptural, three-dimensional paintings primarily in impasto. His most significant early work uses pastels. Pastels, or watercolours, is also the medium of studies for his more important paintings. His work includes relief printing, and dry-point, and soft ground acid etchings.

== Exhibitions ==
His first solo exhibition was in 2011 at the Fabrica Gallery, Coupla in Moscow. He has since participated in numerous exhibitions both in the UK and internationally. He has exhibited twice in the A. Kasteev Art Museum in Almaty, Kazakhstan, and participated in exhibitions in Dubai and Monaco. In London he has exhibited twice at the Brick Lane Gallery, London. In May 2018 he has a solo exhibition "Way of Life" at The C. John Gallery, Mayfair.

== Birth and family ==
Prince Rostislav Rostislavovich was born in Lake Forest, Illinois, the eldest son and second child of Prince Rostislav Rostislavovich and his second wife, Christia Ipsen (b. 1949). He has an older sister, Princess Alexandra (b. 1983), and a younger brother, Prince Nikita (b. 1987). From his father's first marriage to Stephena Verdel Cook, he has an older half-sister, Princess Stephena (born 1963).

Prince Rostislav belongs to the Mihailovichi branch of the Romanov family as a male line descendant of Grand Duke Michael Nikolaevich of Russia, the youngest son of Emperor Nicholas I. He is also a descendant of Emperors Alexander II and Alexander III, being the great-grandson of Grand Duchess Xenia Alexandrovna of Russia (sister of the last Emperor Nicholas II) and her husband Grand Duke Alexander Mikhailovich of Russia. Rostislav has been a member of the Romanov Family Association since 1985 and was a committee member between 2007 and 2013.

Rostislav lived in Chicago until he was two months old, when his father moved his family to London. The family then moved to the town of Rye in East Sussex, where he spent his teenage years. Prince Rostislav was educated at Brambletye and Milton Abbey Schools, and at Falmouth University where he read Fine Art.

Rostislav visited Russia in 1998 with his parents and siblings to attend the reburial rites of Emperor Nicholas II and his family. Six months later, on 7 January 1999, his father died during the Russian Christmas celebration. Though he had been treated for cancer, some speculate that he contracted a rare illness from the dust at the church where the Imperial funeral was held. The loss of the late Prince's income left his family facing financial difficulties. In order to provide for the family, Princess Romanova started a bed and breakfast in an 18th-century mansion in Rye, East Sussex. The house was in a semi-derelict state, though, and in need of renovation. As there was initially no kitchen, the children had to carry buckets of water up to the bathroom in order to wash the dishes in the bathtub. His mother later married David Whitney Erskine Russell, the heir to the title Baron Ampthill.

== Russian prince ==
On 23 September 2006, Prince Rostislav was a guest at the memorial service for his great-great-grandmother the Dowager Empress Maria Feodorovna (born Princess Dagmar of Denmark) at Roskilde Cathedral in Denmark. He then attended the reburial of his great-great-grandmother's remains in Russia, where he announced that he was considering moving to Russia. The Romanov Family Association considers Rostislav to be fourth in line to the throne, but the line of succession is disputed by another branch of the family. Furthermore, the Romanov Family Association has essentially renounced any claims to the Russian throne upon its formation in 1979.

In November 2007 Prince Rostislav was featured in a documentary produced by France 3 called "Un nom en héritage, les Romanov" where he was filmed visiting St. Petersburg, the former Imperial capital. In July 2009 accompanying his cousin Prince Dimitri Romanovich, he attended events in St. Petersburg to commemorate the 91st anniversary of the murder of Nicholas II and his family. It was also announced that he was visiting Russia to learn the language.

== Current life ==
In 2009, Prince Rostislav became the first Romanov to move back to Russia, where he lived for two years and studied Russian. He currently splits his time between the United Kingdom and Russia.

The late president of the Romanov Family Association, Prince Nicholas, appointed him the official representative of the association in Russia. In March, 2023, Rostislav was elected president of the Romanov Family Association. From 2014 to the present, Prince Rostislav has been the fount of honour for the Orthodox Order of Saint John (OOSJ).

In 2010, Prince Rostislav was appointed honorary director of the board of Russia's oldest factory, founded by his ancestor Peter the Great: The Petrodvorets Watch Factory – Raketa. He was also advisor to the factory's creative department.

== Marriage ==
In September 2021, Prince Rostislav married Foteini Georganta in a religious ceremony in the Alexander Nevsky cathedral in Paris. The wedding reception took place in the Cercle de l’Union Interalliée, a building that briefly housed the Russian Embassy in Paris after the Napoleonic Wars.

Georganta is from a Greek perfume manufacturing family, and was brought up in Athens. She later studied French and Byzantine Greek at St Anne's College, University of Oxford, before completing postgraduate studies in dramaturgy at London University's Royal Central School of Speech and Drama. Subsequently, she worked for a decade as a historical playwright, before moving on to working for two charity foundations.

The couple has one son.

== Ancestry ==
Ancestors of Prince Rostislav Romanov (born 1985)

8. Grand Duke Alexander Mikhailovich of Russia
4. Prince Rostislav Alexandrovich of Russia
9. Grand Duchess Xenia Alexandrovna of Russia
2. Prince Rostislav Rostislavovich Romanov
10. Prince Paul Pavlovich Galitzine
5. Princess Alexandra Pavlovna Galitzine
11. Princess Alexandra Nikolaevna Mestchersky
1. Prince Rostislav Rostislavovich
12. Mogens Ipsen
6. Harold Noregaard Ipsen
13. Adele Noregaard
3. Christia Ipsen
14. Michael Wrobel
7. Lorraine Wrobel
15. Martha Lang

Prince Rostislav Romanov (born 1985) House of Holstein-Gottorp-Romanov Cadet branch of the House of Oldenburg Born: 21 May 1985
Titles in pretence
Preceded by Prince Alexis Romanov	Line of succession to the Russian throne 3rd position (disputed)	Succeeded by Prince Nikita Romanov
