= Fanny Knight =

Correspondent of the novelist Jane Austen (1793–1882)

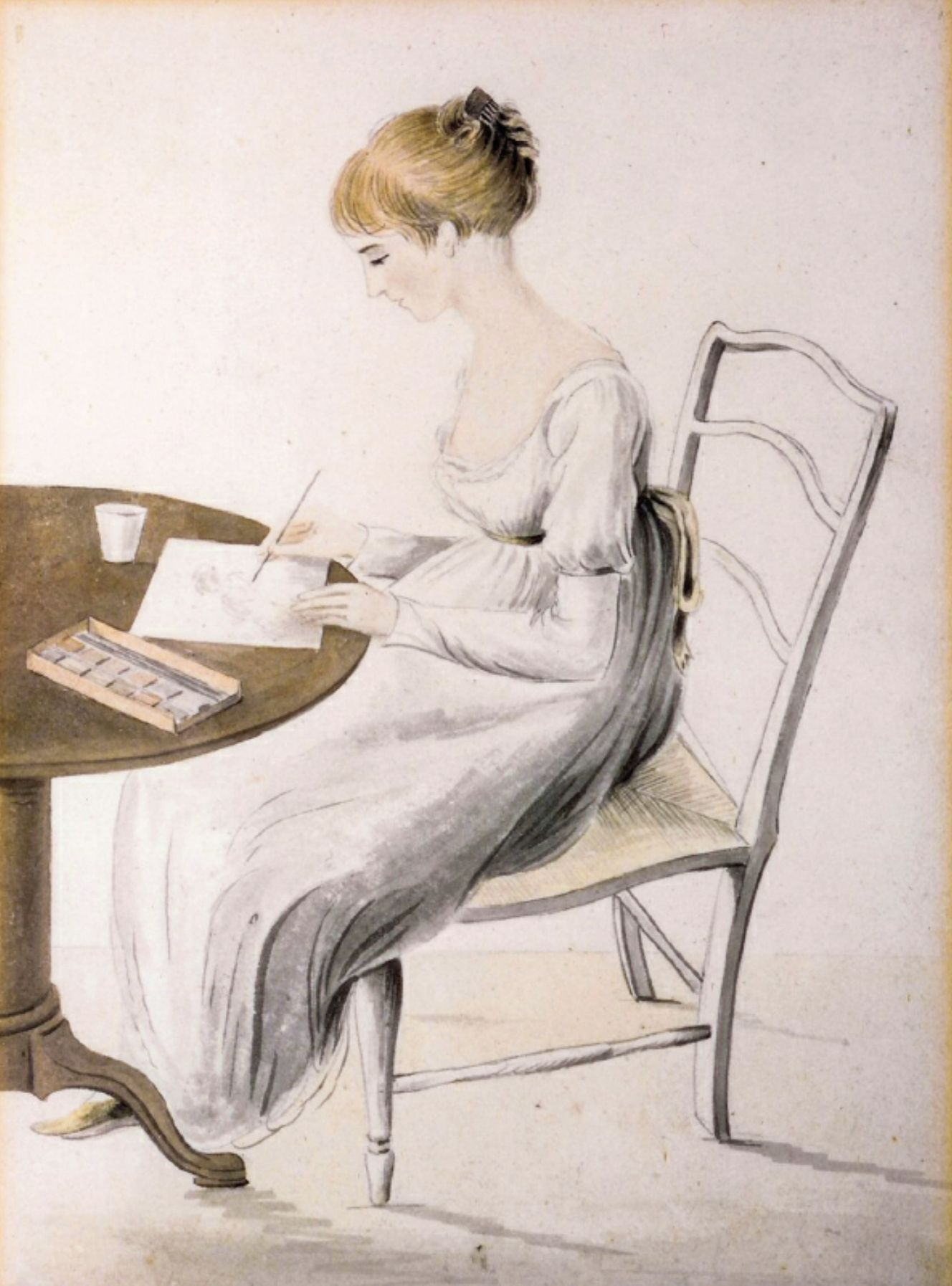
- Portrait of Fanny Knight, by her aunt, Cassandra Austen
- Born: Frances Catherine Austen Knight; January 23, 1793
- Died: December 24, 1882 (aged 89)
- Spouse(s): Edward Knatchbull (1820-1849, his death)
- Children: 9, including: Edward; Herbert; William
- Father: Edward Austen Knight
- Relatives: Jane Austen, aunt

Frances Catherine Austen Knight, Lady Knatchbull (23 January 1793 – 24 December 1882), was the eldest niece and correspondent of the novelist Jane Austen. Her recollections, in the form of letters and diaries, have been an important source for students of her aunt's life and work.

== Early life ==
Fanny Knight was the daughter of Edward Austen Knight, Jane Austen's brother, and his wife, the former Elizabeth Bridges. Edward had been adopted by the wealthy but childless Knight family, and inherited their property of Godmersham Park. Fanny was the eldest of Edward and Elizabeth's eleven children. As a child, one of her governesses was Anne Sharp, whom she introduced to Jane Austen, resulting in a long correspondence between the two, even after Sharp left the household. Elizabeth died when Fanny was fifteen years old, and the bond between Jane and Fanny became stronger.

Fanny was also among Austen's earliest known readers. In the manuscript Opinions of Mansfield Park, which records responses from family members and friends, Fanny Knight's named comment describes herself as "delighted with Fanny [Price]" but "not satisfied with the end", adding that she wanted "more Love between her & Edmund" and could not think it natural that Edmund should be so attached to Mary Crawford or should encourage Fanny Price to marry Henry Crawford.

She came close to marrying the strait-laced Christian John Plumptre, whom she ultimately rejected partly on advice from her aunt Jane, who told her only to prolong the relationship if she was sure she loved him. When Jane Austen died in 1817, a lock of her hair was sent to Fanny.

== Marriage and later life ==
At the age of 27, Fanny Knight married Sir Edward Knatchbull, a baronet, widowed with six children from his first marriage. He was twelve years older than her; besides his title, he was a recently elected MP and the owner of the Mersham Hatch estate in Kent.

In January 1825, four years after her marriage, Fanny gave birth to a daughter, whom she named Frances (Fanny) Elizabeth. This was the first of nine children born to the couple. Other children included:

- Reverend Reginald Bridges Knatchbull-Hugessen (1831-1911), who married firstly in 1866 Mary Brockman and secondly in 1885 Rachel Mary Montgomery and had children from both marriages.
- Herbert Thomas Knatchbull-Hugessen (1835-1922)
- William Western Knatchbull-Hugessen (1837–1864)
- Eleanor Grace Knatchbull (d. 1913), who married in 1857 Robert John O'Reilly

Later, Fanny's brother, Edward Austen Knight, junior, eloped with one of the daughters of Sir Edward Knatchbull's first marriage, Mary Dorothea. The marriage was considered inappropriate, and resulted in an estrangement between the Knight and Knatchbull families.

Sir Edward died in 1849, and the baronetcy passed to Norton Knatchbull, a son from his first marriage. Following his death, Lady Knatchbull lived at Provender House in Faversham, Kent, a property her husband had inherited from his mother. As she aged, she began to suffer from memory loss and was unable to find documents she had inherited, including some of Jane Austen's letters to her sister Cassandra, who had died in 1845. Following her death, her son, Edward Knatchbull-Hugessen, 1st Baron Brabourne, discovered a collection of letters from Jane Austen, which Lady Knatchbull had kept at home, and these were published as Letters from Jane Austen in 1884.

== Fictional portrayals ==
Miss Austen Regrets (2007), a television dramatisation of parts of Jane Austen's life, starring Olivia Williams, was based on Austen's correspondence. Fanny Knight is played by Imogen Poots.

The younger Fanny Knight is a major character in Gill Hornby's 2022 novel Godmersham Park, and also in Hornby's 2025 novel, The Elopement.
