= Romanov Family Association =

Organization that cultivates the memory of the Russian imperial family

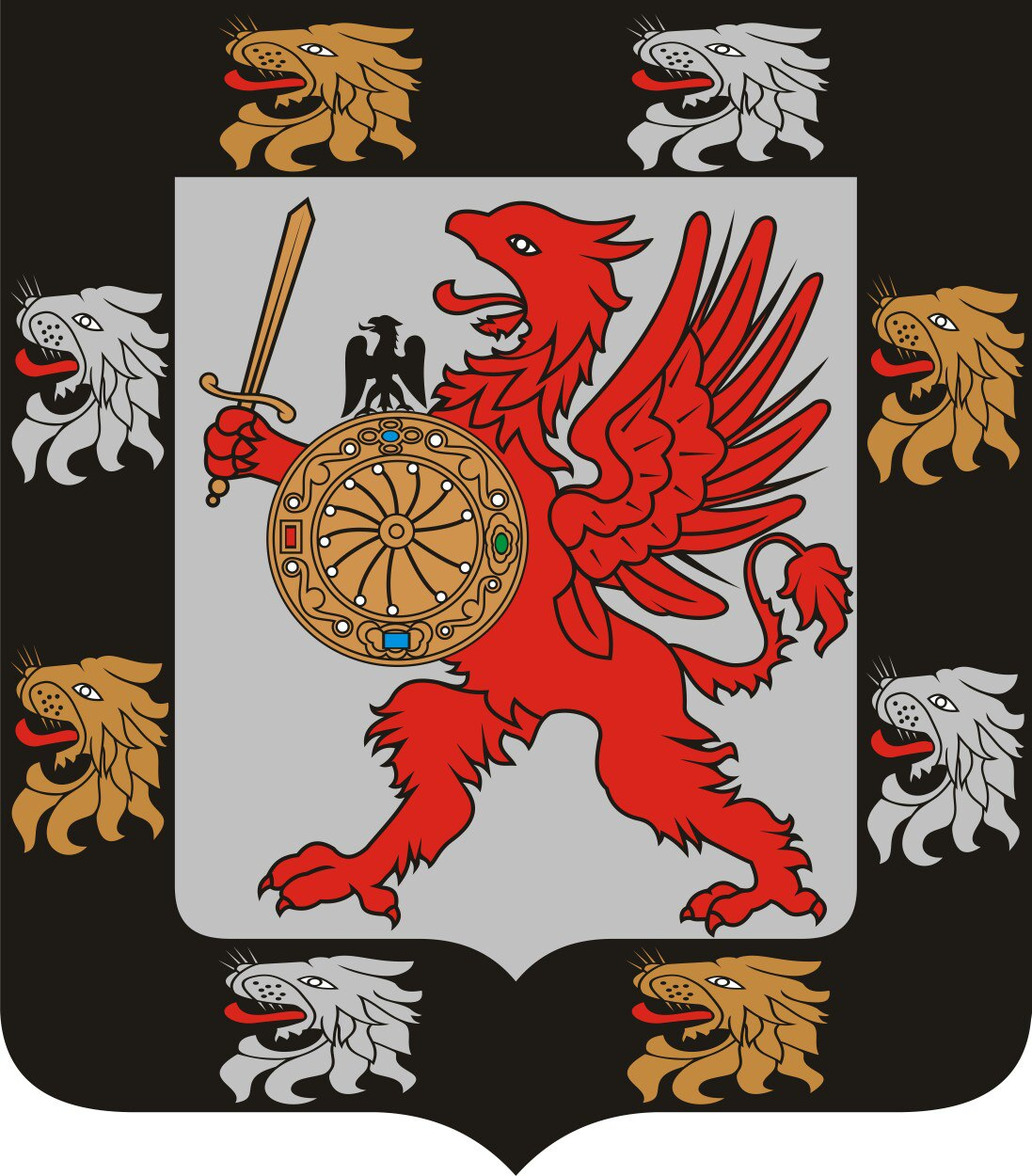
- Formation: 1979; 47 years ago
- Type: Family association
- Members: House of Romanov
- President: Princess Olga Andreevna
- Vice President: Prince Rostislav Rostislavovich
- Main organ: General assembly
- Website: romanovfamily.org

The Romanov Family Association (RFA, frequently written as Romanoff; Russian: Объедине́ние чле́нов рода́ Рома́новых, romanized: Obyedinéniye chlénov rodá Románovykh) is an organization for descendants of the former Russian Imperial House. It was created in 1979 and officially registered in Switzerland. The current head of the organization is Princess Olga Andreevna.

== History ==
The idea for the creation of a family association was thought up by Prince Vsevolod Ioannovich, Prince Roman Petrovich and Prince Andrei Alexandrovich, the heads of the Konstantinovichi, Nikolaevichi and Mihailovichi branches of the Imperial family in order to strengthen the links between the family and protect it from impostors. Following the death of Prince Roman Petrovich in 1978, his son Prince Nicholas Romanovich, after looking through his father's papers found that everything was effectively in place for the creation of a family association. Prince Nicholas then wrote to all the Romanovs who had been in communication with his father and it was agreed that a family association should be created. In 1979 the Romanov Family Association (RFA) was officially formed with Prince Dmitri Alexandrovich as president and Prince Nicholas Romanovich as vice president. Prince Nicholas Romanovich was elected president, following Prince Vasili Alexandrovich who died in 1989.

The association accepts that since 3 March (Julian Calendar) / 16 March (Gregorian Calendar) 1917 with the decree of Grand Duke Michael Alexandrovich of Russia's deferral of acceptance of the throne, that the Russian Provisional Government was recognized. Article IV-b of the bylaws of the RFA states "The Members of the Association agree that all questions concerning the form of government in Russia and consequently also all matters of a dynastic character have been transmitted to the will of the great Russian people by the Manifest of Grand Duke Michael Alexandrovich, which followed the abdication of Emperor Nicholas II on the basis of 'general, direct, equal and secret voting'."

As a charitable endeavor, the association operates the Romanov Fund for Russia to raise money for aid projects in Russia.

== Members ==
The RFA is an organization of legitimate male-line descendants of Emperor Nicholas I of Russia. While extensive, it by no means includes all of the House of Romanov or all Romanov descendants; Maria Vladimirovna has never joined and neither did her late father, Vladimir Cyrillovich. The association attributes the title of Prince or Princess of Russia to each of its members. Members of the association now living are:

- Prince Dmitri Pavlovich Romanov-Ilynsky (b. 1954), grandson of Grand Duke Dmitri Pavlovich
  - Princess Catherine Dmitrievna Romanov-Ilynsky (b. 1981), daughter of Prince Dmitri Pavlovich
  - Princess Victoria Dmitrievna Romanov-Ilynsky (b. 1984), daughter of Prince Dmitri Pavlovich
  - Princess Lela Dmitrievna Romanov-Ilynsky (b. 1986), daughter of Prince Dmitri Pavlovich
- Princess Paula Pavlovna Romanov-Ilynsky (b. 1956), granddaughter of Grand Duke Dmitri Pavlovich
- Princess Anna Pavlovna Romanov-Ilynsky (b. 1959), granddaughter of Grand Duke Dmitri Pavlovich
- Princess Natalia Nikolaevna (b. 1952), granddaughter of Prince Roman Petrovich
- Princess Elizabeth Nikolaevna (b. 1956), granddaughter of Prince Roman Petrovich
- Princess Tatiana Nikolaevna (b. 1961), granddaughter of Prince Roman Petrovich
  - Prince Alexis Andreevich (b. 1953), grandson of Prince Andrei Alexandrovich
  - Prince Peter Andreevich (b. 1961), grandson of Prince Andrei Alexandrovich
  - Prince Andrew Andreevich (b. 1963), grandson of Prince Andrei Alexandrovich
- Princess Olga Andreevna (b. 1950), daughter of Prince Andrei Alexandrovich
- Prince Rostislav Rostislavich (b. 1985), grandson of Prince Rostislav Alexandrovich
- Prince Nikita Rostislavich (b. 1987), grandson of Prince Rostislav Alexandrovich
- Princess Stephena Rostislavna (b. 1963), granddaughter of Prince Rostislav Alexandrovich
- Princess Alexandra Rostislavna (b. 1983), granddaughter of Prince Rostislav Alexandrovich
- Princess Marina Vasilievna (b. 1940), daughter of Prince Vasili Alexandrovich

The RFA also offers Associate Memberships to the children and grandchildren of princesses and grand duchesses, widows and widowers of princes and princesses and grand dukes and grand duchesses, as well as people who have always shown close ties to the Romanovs. One of the Associate Members as of 1998 is still alive:

- Mrs Xenia Sfiris née Countess Sheremeteva (b. 1942), granddaughter of Princess Irina Alexandrovna

== General Assembly ==
- President: Princess Olga Andreevna
- Vice president: Prince Rostislav Rostislavovich

=== Committee members ===
- Prince Alexis Andreevich
- Prince Artyom Alekseyevich
- Prince Nikita Rostislavovich
- Princess Natalia Nikolaevna
- Princess Catherine Dmitrievna
- Princess Alexandra Rostislavna

== Presidents ==
- Prince Dmitri Alexandrovich (1979–1980)
- Prince Vasili Alexandrovich (1980–1989)
- Prince Nicholas Romanovich (1989–2014)
- Prince Dimitri Romanovich (2014–2016)
- Princess Olga Andreevna (since December 2017)
