= Dorrit Reventlow =

Dorrit Romanov
- Princess Theodora Alexeevna Romanov
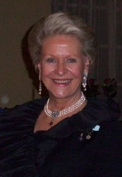
- Princess Theodora Alexeevna Romanov, pictured in 2011
- Born: Dorrit Reventlow; 22 April 1942 (age 84); Recife, Brazil
- Spouse: Dom Telmo José Coelho de Braganza (m. 1961; died 1985) Prince Dimitri Romanov (m. 1993; died 2016)
- Issue: Dona Maria de Braganza Pederson
- House: Holstein-Gottorp-Romanov (by marriage); Reventlow (by birth)
- Father: Eric Reventlow
- Mother: Nina Bent Rasmussen
- Religion: Eastern Orthodox Church

Princess Theodora Alexeevna Romanov (née Dorrit Reventlow; born 22 April 1942) is a Danish translator, benefactor, philanthropist, social activist, and the widow of Prince Dimitri Romanov, who had claims to the headship of the Imperial House of Russia.

== Biography ==
She was born Dorrit Reventlow on 22 April 1942 in the city of Recife, Brazil, in the family of Eric Reventlow (1903–1944) and his wife Nina Bent Rasmussen (1912–1996). She is a direct descendant of Landgrave Conrad Georg von Reventlow (1749-1815), Privy Councillor of Denmark from his extramarital relationship with his mistress Marie Sophie Brag (b. 1770). Dorrit is the third child in the family, her sister Rosa was born in 1938 and is married to French-Brazilian industrialist Jose Carlos Gonçalves. Brother George was born in 1941 and lived only eight years and died in 1949 in Denmark.

Dorrit's father died when she was only two years and in 1946 the family returned to Denmark. She attended private schools in Denmark and Switzerland, where she learned Portuguese, English, French, Italian and Spanish. In 1976 she opened her own translation company in Lisbon. After the death of her first husband in 1985 she returned to Denmark, where she worked as a representative of a Portuguese tourism company, also serving as the chair of a Danish-Brazilian society. In this role, Princess Dorrit succeeded in expanding the society's membership, while promoting Portuguese language and culture.

Since 1993, she has headed her own translation firm called Translator Dorrit Romanoff & Assoc. In her free time she actively helped her husband in his humanitarian and charitable work in Russia.

== Marriages and children ==
In 1961, she married Dom Telmo José Coelho de Braganza (1925–1985), descendant of King Pedro II of Portugal. They had one daughter:

- Sibila Maria India Reventlow (b. 1966), married in 1988 Peter Enggaard Pedersen (b. 1965) and had issue

At a reception in 1991, Dorrit met Prince Dimitri Romanovich Romanov, the second son of Prince Roman Petrovich of Russia (1896-1978) and his wife, Countess Praskovia Dmitrievna Sheremeteva (1901-1980). In July 1993 they were married in Kostroma, which became the first visit of some Romanov spouses to Russia. Prior to her 1993 wedding, Dorrit joined the Russian Orthodox Church in Kostroma under the name Theodora Alexeevna. The marriage remained childless.

== Honours ==
- Portugal : Grand Officer of the Order of Merit (26 August 1992)
- Brazil : Commander of the Order of the Southern Cross (5 September 2007)

=== Dynastic orders ===
- Montenegro : Grand Cross of the Order of Prince Danilo I (4 June 2005)

Dorrit Reventlow House of Romanov Born: 22 April 1942
Titles in pretence
| Preceded by Countess Sveva della Gherardesca | — TITULAR — The Wife of the Head of the Romanov dynasty 15 September 2014 – 31 December 2016; Reason for succession failure: Empire abolished in 1917 | Succeeded by Inez Storer |
