= Provender House =

Provender
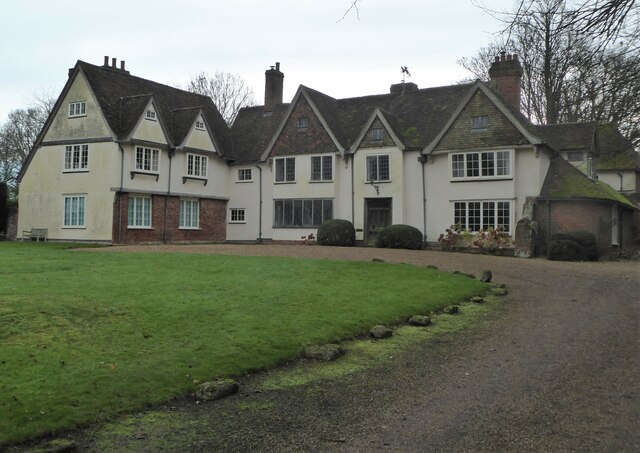
- The front of the house in 2020
- Interactive map of Provender
- 51°18′41″N 0°49′49″E

History
- Built: 1342
- Built for: Lucas de Vienne

Site notes
- Owner: Princess Olga Romanoff
- Website: provenderhouse.co.uk

Listed Building – Grade II*
- Designated: 27 August 1952

Provender is an English country house in Norton near Faversham in the English county of Kent. It is privately owned but open for tours on certain days, and is an event venue.

== Location ==
The house is reached along Provender Lane, Norton, a village in the Swale district of Kent. It has been listed as Grade II* on the National Heritage List for England since 27 August 1952.

== History ==
The house was built in 1342 for Lucas of Vienne, the Chief Archer to Edward, the Black Prince. It was altered and extended between the 15th and the 19th centuries, with James Hugessen buying the property in 1633. The house remained in the Hugesson and Knatchbull-Hugessen families for over 300 years. Sir Edward Knatchbull, 9th Baronet inherited it from Dorothea Hugessen, Lady Banks, who had married naturalist Sir Joseph Banks but died childless, and the estate was farmed by William Knatchbull-Hugessen in the 1860s. Following Sir Edward's death, his widow, the former Fanny Knight (niece of Jane Austen), lived there until her death in 1882.

The widowed Constance Borgström née Paterson started to live there as a tenant in the 1890s. She was the widow of a rich Finnish businessman, consul Emil Borgström, one of the younger sons of Councillor Henrik Borgström and his wife Carolina née Kjemmer. Emil was from a key Finnish banking family who had British business links since his training with British merchants in the early part of the century.

One of Constance's daughters, Sylvia, a Finnish-born heiress, married Colonel Herbert McDougall of the British Army in 1906, and bought the house and its land in 1912. Since then, the property has passed from mother to daughter twice.

Sylvia's eldest daughter and heiress was Nadine McDougall (1908–2000), who became the second wife of Prince Andrew (or Andrei) of Russia (1897–1981). He was the eldest son of Grand Duke Alexander Mikhailovich of Russia and Grand Duchess Xenia Alexandrovna of Russia, sister of the last Tsar. The house became Prince Andrew's main residence in exile from 1950. The next owner is their daughter, Princess Olga Andreevna Romanoff, who has three surviving children. Romanoff had the house refurbished in the 2000s by the architect Ptolemy Dean.

== Bibliography ==
- Carlaw, Derek (2020). Kent County Cricketers, A to Z: Part One (1806–1914) (PDF). Cardiff: ACS.
