= Prince Vasili Alexandrovich of Russia =

Russian prince, nephew of Nicholas II (1908–1989)

Prince Vasili Alexandrovich
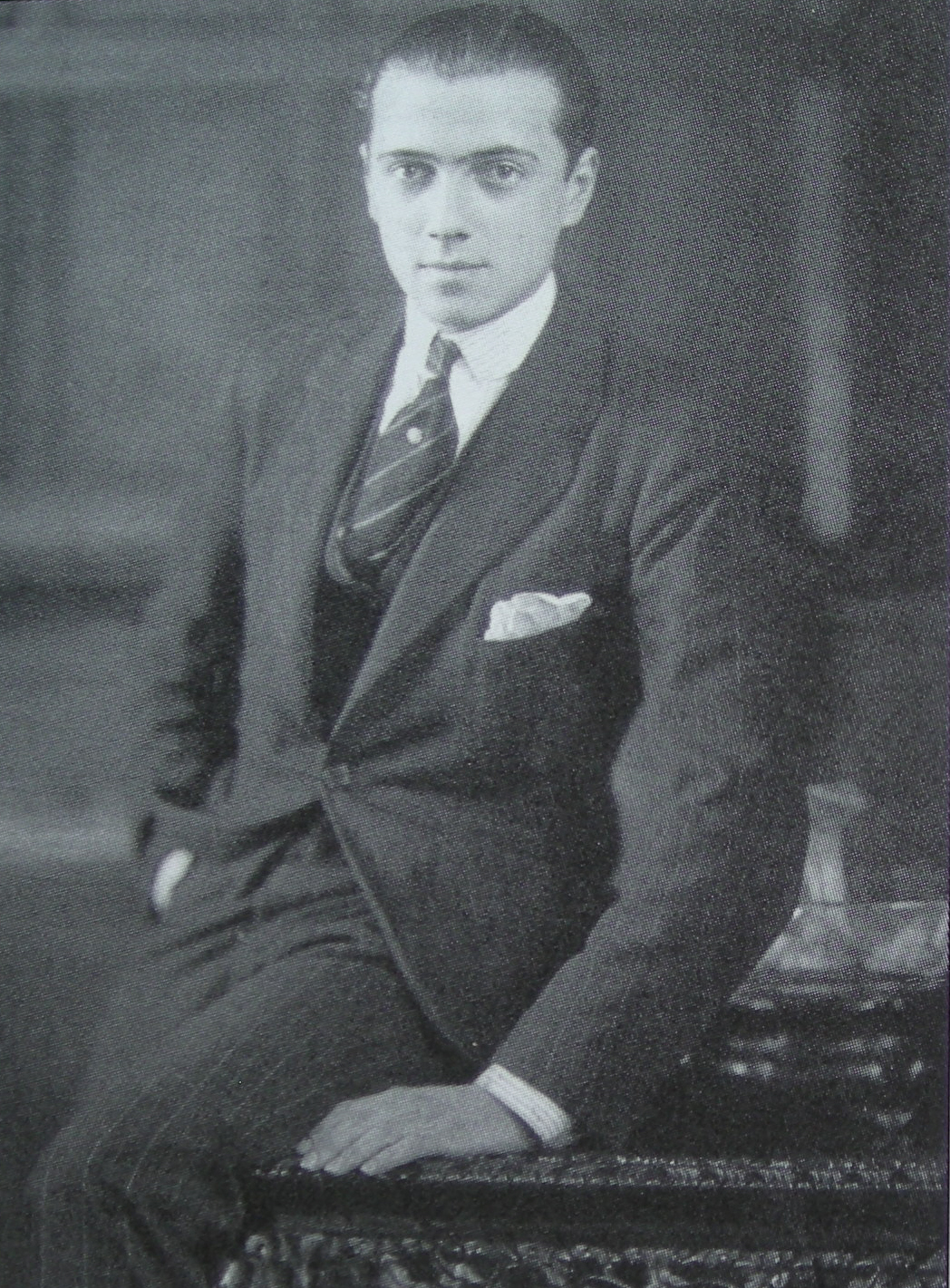
- Pictured in 1923

President of the Romanov Family Association
- Tenure: 7 July 1980 – 24 June 1989
- Predecessor: Prince Dimitri Alexandrovich
- Successor: Prince Nicholas Romanovich
- Born: 7 July 1907; Gatchina Palace, Gatchina, Russian Empire
- Died: 24 June 1989 (aged 81); Woodside, California, United States
- Spouse: Princess Natalia Alexandrovna Golitsyna (m. 1931)
- Issue: Princess Marina Vasilievna of Russia
- House: Holstein-Gottorp-Romanov
- Father: Grand Duke Alexander Mikhailovich of Russia
- Mother: Grand Duchess Xenia Alexandrovna of Russia

Prince Vasili Alexandrovich of Russia (7 July [O.S. 24 June] 1907 – 24 June 1989) was the sixth son and youngest child of Grand Duke Alexander Mikhailovich of Russia and Grand Duchess Xenia Alexandrovna of Russia. He was a nephew of Tsar Nicholas II of Russia.

Born in Imperial Russia during the reign of his paternal second cousin and maternal uncle Nicholas II, he was on vacation in Crimea at the fall of the Russian monarchy. He was joined there by his immediate family. They escaped the fate of many of his relatives killed by the Bolsheviks. He left Russia in April 1919, at age 11. In the late 1920s, he emigrated to the United States where he met Princess Natalia Golitsyna. They married in 1931. The couple had one daughter and lived for decades in Woodside, California.

== Early life ==
Prince Vasili Alexandrovich Romanov was born at Gatchina Palace on 7 July 1907, the sixth son and last of the seven children of Grand Duke Alexander Mikhailovich and Grand Duchess Xenia Alexandrovna of Russia. Although a grandson of Emperor Alexander III through his mother, he was not entitled to the title Grand Duke of Russia because he was only a great-grandson of Emperor Nicholas I in the male line through his father. He was a sickly child and after his birth there was some doubts that he would survive so he was baptized in the nursery. Shortly after his birth his parents started to live separate lives. Prince Vasili spent his early years in Imperial Russia during the reign of his maternal uncle Tsar Nicholas II. At the fall of Russian monarchy in February 1917 Vasili, aged ten, was on vacation in Ai-Todor, his father's estate in Crimea. By the end of March both of his parents, all his siblings and their grandmother Empress Maria Feodorovna were also in Crimea.

In his memoirs, Vasili's father shared an anecdote about how one revolutionary tried to inspire Vasili to believe in the revolutionary ideals: "He addressed the boy in the language of Robespierre, so as to stick to the model in every detail. My son corrected his French phrasing and let it go at that. My wife laughed but I felt a peculiar presentiment of danger."

After the Russian Revolution, when the Bolsheviks seized power in October 1917, Prince Vasili along with his parents, siblings and grandmother the Dowager Empress were placed under house arrest at Ai-Todor. On 11 March 1918 they were transferred with other Romanovs relatives to Dulber, the estate of Grand Duke Peter Nikolaevich in Crimea. He escaped the fate of a number of his Romanov relatives imprisoned who were murdered by the Bolsheviks when he was freed with the Romanovs in his group by German troops in May 1918. He escaped from Russia on 11 April 1919 with the help of his great-aunt Queen Alexandra of the United Kingdom (née Princess Alexandra of Denmark), who was Empress Dowager Maria Feodorovna's sister. King George V of the United Kingdom sent the British warship HMS Marlborough which brought Vasili's family and other Romanovs from the Crimea over the Black Sea to Malta and then to England. Prince Vasili, who was eleven years old at the time, spent the rest of his life in exile.

== Exile ==
During his first years in exile, Prince Vasili lived in England with his mother. In the late 1920s, he emigrated to the United States where he spent the rest of his life. Vasili earned a living by finding work as a cabin boy, shipyard worker, stockbroker, winemaker and a chicken farmer in northern California.

Prince Vasili married in New York City on 31 July 1931, Princess Natalia Golitsyna (Moscow 26 October 1907 – Woodside 28 March 1989), a fellow Russian exile – they met in the United States. Natalia was a distant cousin of Prince Rostislav's wife. Her sister, Princess Olga Golitsyna, married Geoffrey Tooth, who would become the second husband of Vasili's niece, Princess Xenia Andreevna. Princess Natalia came from one of Russia's most aristocratic families, the noble Golitsyns. Her father, Prince Alexander Golitsyn, the son of the governor of Moscow, was a country doctor. Her mother was Lyubov Vladimirovna Golitsyna (nee Glebova). Princess Natalia escaped revolutionary Russia with her family in 1920 through Siberia to China. In 1927, they moved to the United States. For a time, she pursued a career as an actress playing small parts in the theater and in silent films. Prince Vasili met Princess Natalia Golitsyna in 1931, marrying her a few months later. The couple moved to Northern California in 1934. They lived for the rest of their lives in a house, 30 km. south of San Francisco. Prince Vasili and his wife had one daughter:

- Princess Marina Romanov (born in San Francisco 22 May 1940); married in Woodside, California on 8 January 1967 (divorced) William Beadleston (born in Long Branch, New Jersey 31 July 1938) an art dealer. They had four children: Tatiana (b. 1968) Alexandra (b. 1970) Nicholas (b. 1971) Natalie (b. 1976). Princess Marina Romanov is now married to Daniel Stanberry and lives in Aspen, Colorado. They have one daughter Bodhi (b. 1991).

In 1980, Prince Vasili was appointed president of the Romanov Family Association in succession to his brother Prince Dmitry Alexandrovich. He remained president until his death in Woodside, California aged 81. He was buried at the Serbian Cemetery in San Francisco.

== Marriage ==
It is often alleged that Vasili's marriage with Princess Golitsyna would have been morganatic. However, Romanov biographer Pieter Broek holds that it was as acceptable dynastically as the Bagrationi marriage of Vasili's cousin, Grand Duke Vladimir Kirillovich of Russia. Since the extinction of the Korecki family in the 17th century, the Golitsyns have claimed dynastic seniority in the House of Gediminas. The Gediminids were a dynasty of monarchs of the Grand Duchy of Lithuania that reigned from the 14th to the 16th century and Emperor Peter I had permitted the Golitsyns to incorporate the emblem of the Grand Duchy of Lithuania into their coat of arms.

== Ancestry ==
Ancestors of Prince Vasili Alexandrovich of Russia

8. Nicholas I of Russia
4. Grand Duke Michael Nikolaevich of Russia
9. Princess Charlotte of Prussia
2. Grand Duke Alexander Mikhailovich of Russia
10. Leopold I, Grand Duke of Baden
5. Princess Cecilie of Baden
11. Princess Sofia of Sweden
1. Prince Vasili Alexandrovich of Russia
12. Alexander II of Russia
6. Alexander III of Russia
13. Princess Marie of Hesse
3. Grand Duchess Xenia Alexandrovna of Russia
14. Christian IX of Denmark
7. Princess Dagmar of Denmark
15. Princess Louise of Hesse-Kassel

Prince Vasili Alexandrovich of Russia House of Holstein-Gottorp-Romanov Cadet branch of the House of Oldenburg Born: 7 July 1907 Died: 24 June 1989
Non-profit organization positions
Preceded by Prince Dmitri Alexandrovich of Russia	President of the Romanov Family Association; 1980–1989	Succeeded by Nicholas Romanovich, Prince of Russia
