= Prince Nicholas Romanov =

Nicholas Romanovich Romanov

Head of the House of Romanov (disputed)
- Time: 21 April 1992 – 15 September 2014
- Predecessor: Grand Duke Vladimir Kirillovich
- Successor: Prince Dimitri Romanovich

President of the Romanov Family Association
- Reign: 24 June 1989 – 15 September 2014
- Predecessor: Prince Vasili Alexandrovich
- Successor: Prince Dimitri Romanovich
- Born: 26 September 1922; Cap d'Antibes, France
- Died: 15 September 2014 (aged 91); Bolgheri, Tuscany, Italy
- Spouse: Countess Sveva della Gherardesca (m. 1951)
- Issue Detail: Princess Natalia Nikolaevna; Princess Elizabeth Nikolaevna; Princess Tatiana Nikolaevna
- House: Holstein-Gottorp-Romanov
- Father: Prince Roman Petrovich of Russia
- Mother: Countess Praskovia Dmitrievna Sheremeteva

Nicholas Romanovich Romanov (Russian: Николай Романович Романов; 26 September 1922 – 15 September 2014) was a claimant to the headship of the House of Romanov and president of the Romanov Family Association. Although undoubtedly a descendant of Emperor Nicholas I of Russia, his claimed titles and official membership in the former Imperial House were disputed by those who maintained that his parents' marriage violated the laws of the Russian Empire.

== Family and childhood ==
Prince Nicholas was born in Cap d'Antibes near Antibes, France, the eldest son of Prince Roman Petrovich and his wife Princess Praskovia Dmitrievna (née Countess Sheremeteva). Prince Nicholas had a younger brother, Prince Dimitri Romanovich. Their father Prince Roman Petrovich was the only son of Grand Duke Peter Nicolaievich and Grand Duchess Militsa Nikolaievna (née Princess of Montenegro). His grandfather was the younger son of Grand Duke Nicholas Nikolaevich and Grand Duchess Alexandra Petrovna (née Duchess of Oldenburg). His great grandfather Nicholas Nikolaevich was a younger son of Emperor Nicholas I of Russia and Empress Alexandra Fyodorovna (née Princess Charlotte of Prussia) and founded the Nikolaevichi branch of the Russian Imperial Family.

Prince Nicholas was brought up in Cap d'Antibes with his family still using the Julian calendar and he spoke both fluent Russian and French from his childhood on. He was brought up in a Russian environment with his local church having a Russian priest and his family employing Russian staff and a Russian nanny.

== Education and naval aspirations ==
Prince Nicholas received a private education in France with his studies following the old Russian school curriculum. In 1936 his family moved to Italy due to the standard of schooling supposedly being better there. He aspired to be a naval officer and had convinced his parents by the age of 12 that this was his dream. However, as he was a Romanov and there was a Soviet Navy and not an Imperial Russian Navy, he decided to work towards a career in the Italian Navy. Using his family's close relationship to the Italian Royal Family (both his grandmother Militza and Queen Helena of Italy, wife of King Victor Emmanuel III, were daughters of King Nicholas I of Montenegro) he began to study in Italy under the tutelage of a retired Italian Naval officer with the aim of attending the Naval Academy of Livorno. However, Nicholas's hopes of a Naval career evaporated when he showed signs of near-sightedness.

He completed his education in Italy graduating from a Liceo classico in 1942.

== World War II and post war ==
During World War II, Prince Nicholas and his family lived at the residence of Victor Emmanuel III of Italy. When the King left Rome, Nicholas and his family went into hiding for nine months. During the occupation of Rome by Germany, Nicholas's grandmother, who was at great risk of deportation as a sister of the Queen, had to take shelter in the Holy See. In 1942, the ruling Fascists in Italy approached Prince Nicholas to offer him the throne of Montenegro. He declined.

Prince Nicholas wanted to study engineering at the University of Rome but the war prevented this, so following its conclusion, he found employment by working as a civilian for the Allies in the Psychological Warfare Division and the United States Information Service. On the advice of King Umberto II Prince Nicholas and his family left Italy for Egypt in 1946. While living in Egypt he was involved in the purchasing and sale of Turkish tobacco as well as finding work in an insurance company.

Returning to Europe in 1950 Prince Nicholas worked in Rome for the Austin Motor Company until 1954. Following the death of his brother-in-law he took over the management of his wife's property and business in Tuscany. The business was a large farm which he managed for 25 years from 1955 to 1980 where he bred Chianina cattle and produced wine. He sold the farm in 1982 and moved to Rougemont, Switzerland. A refugee from birth, Prince Nicholas was a stateless person and used to travel abroad on a letter issued by the King of Greece. He finally became a citizen of Italy in 1988. Prince Nicholas visited Russia for the first time in June 1992 when he acted as a second tour guide for a group of businessmen. He often appeared in the media to talk about the Romanovs, giving over 100 television interviews, and appearing in television documentaries such as the 2003 Danish documentary "En Kongelig familie" and the 2007 France 3 produced documentary called "Un nom en héritage, les Romanov". In 1999, a documentary on his life was produced by the Russian television channel NTV.

== Romanov Family Association ==
His father Roman Petrovich came up with the idea of a family association of the Romanovs in the mid-1970s. After looking through the papers of his father, who died in 1978, Nicholas found that everything was in place for its creation. He then wrote to all the members of the Romanov family who had been in communication with his father and it was agreed that a family association should be created. A year later, in 1979, the Romanov Family Association was officially formed with Prince Dmitri Alexandrovich as president and Nicholas as vice-president. When Vasili Alexandrovich became president in 1980, Nicholas remained vice-president.

In 1989, after the death of Vasili Alexandrovich, Prince Nicholas was elected the new president of the Romanov Family Association. The Association currently has as members the majority of the male-line descendants of Emperor Nicholas I of Russia, although Grand Duchess Maria Vladimirovna has never joined, nor did her late father Grand Duke Vladimir Kirillovich.

== Succession claims ==
The official position of the Romanov Family Association is that the rights of the family to the Russian Throne were suspended when Emperor Nicholas II abdicated for himself and for his son Tsarevich Alexei in favour of his brother Grand Duke Michael Alexandrovich who then deferred ascending the Throne until a Constituent Assembly ratified his rule. Emperor Michael II, as he was legally pronounced by Nicholas II, did not abdicate but empowered the Provisional Government to rule. Michael's "reign" was ended with his execution in 1918.

Prince Nicholas considered that following the death of Grand Duke Vladimir Cyrillovich in 1992 that he was head of the House of Romanov and his rightful successor. On the basis that Vladimir Cyrillovich was the last male dynast and all other Romanovs are excluded due to their parents' "unequal" marriages, Vladimir's daughter Grand Duchess Maria Vladimirovna also put forward a claim to the headship of the imperial house on her father's death. With the exception of Grand Duchess Maria, Prince Nicholas was recognized by the rest of the family as head of the Romanov family. However, the final edition of the Almanach de Gotha published by Justus Perthes, in 1944, stated that the marriage of Nicholas's parents was "not in conformity with the laws of the house" although one wartime edition had listed him as a dynastic member of the Imperial House. Prince Nicholas said regarding "unequal" marriages in the Imperial Family:

Our parents married commoners. So what? We have married commoners. Again, so what? There was nobody to ask us to renounce our rights, so we married without renouncing them, and we and our children still have rights to the throne of Russia.

Prince Nicholas led the Romanov family at the funeral in St. Petersburg of the last Russian Emperor Nicholas II and his family in July 1998. As head of the family he was also present at the reburial of the remains of the Dowager Empress Maria Feodorovna in Russia in September 2006. Prince Nicholas and his brother Prince Dmitri had been responsible for lobbying the Danish royal family and the Russian President Vladimir Putin to allow the transfer of the Dowager Empress's remains to Russia so they could be buried alongside her husband Emperor Alexander III.

== Marriage and children ==
Coat of arms of the House of della Gherardesca

In 1950, Prince Nicholas and the Countess Sveva della Gherardesca (b. 15 July 1930, d. 31 May 2026), daughter of Count Walfred della Gherardesca and Nicoletta de Piccolellis, met at a party in Rome. Sveva is a member of the Italian della Gherardesca noble family from Tuscany and a direct descendant of Count Ugolino della Gherardesca. They were married in Florence in a civil ceremony on 31 December 1951 followed by a religious ceremony on 21 January 1952 in the Russian Cathedral at Cannes.

Prince Nicholas and his wife had three daughters:

- Princess Natalia Nikolaevna Romanova (b. 4 December 1952), married to Giuseppe Consolo (born 1948). Her daughter is the Italian actress Nicoletta Romanoff.
- Princess Elisaveta Nikolaevna Romanova (b. 7 August 1956), married to Mauro Bonacini (born 1950);
- Princess Tatiana Nikolaevna Romanova (b. 12 April 1961), married firstly to Giambattista Alessandri (born 1958), then Giancarlo Tirotti (born 1947).

Prince Nicholas and his wife lived in Rougemont, Switzerland, for seven months every year, usually in the winter. During the rest of the year they stayed in Italy with their daughters. The prince still used the Julian calendar and was fluent in French, Russian, Italian and English. He was also able to read Spanish.

Prince Nicholas's death in Tuscany aged 91 was reported on 15 September 2014. He was survived by his wife, their three children, five grandchildren and three great-grandchildren.

== Title and style ==
- His Highness Prince Nicholas Romanovich of Russia

Since the Russian Revolution, members of the Romanov family have tended to drop the territorial designation "of Russia" and use a princely title with the surname Romanov. However this title, and even his right to the surname Romanov are disputed.

He is also known as Prince Nicholas Romanov, Prince Nicholas of Russia, Prince Nicholas Romanoff, and Prince Nikolai Romanov.

== Honours ==
- Knight of the Order of Petrovic Njegos
- Grand Cross of the Order of Prince Danilo I
- Knight of the Order of Saint Peter of Cetinje

== Ancestry ==
Ancestors of Prince Nicholas Romanovich of Russia

8. Grand Duke Nicholas Nikolaevich of Russia
4. Grand Duke Peter Nikolaevich of Russia
9. Duchess Alexandra of Oldenburg
2. Prince Roman Petrovich of Russia
10. Nicholas I of Montenegro
5. Princess Milica of Montenegro
11. Milena Vukotić
1. Nicholas Romanovich, Prince of Russia
12. Count Sergei Dmitrievich Sheremetev
6. Count Dmitri Sergeievich Sheremetev
13. Princess Ekaterina Pavlovna Vyazemskaya
3. Countess Praskovia Dmitrievna Sheremeteva
14. Count Illarion Ivanovich Vorontsov-Dashkov
7. Countess Irina Illarionovna Vorontsov-Dashkov
15. Countess Elizabeth Andreevna Shuvalov

Prince Nicholas Romanov House of Holstein-Gottorp-Romanov Born: 26 September 1922 Died: 15 September 2014
Titles in pretence
Preceded by Grand Duke Vladimir Cyrillovich	— TITULAR — Emperor of Russia; 1992–2014; Reason for succession failure: Empire abolished in 1917	Succeeded by Prince Dimitri Romanovich
Non-profit organization positions
Preceded by Prince Vasili Alexandrovich	President of the Romanov Family Association; 1989–2014	Succeeded by Prince Dimitri Romanovich
