= Knatchbull-Hugessen =

Knatchbull-Hugessen is a compound surname. Notable people with the name include:

- Adrian Knatchbull-Hugessen (1891–1976), Canadian lawyer and senator
- Cecil Knatchbull-Hugessen, 4th Baron Brabourne (1863–1933), English cricketer and British peer
- Edward Knatchbull-Hugessen, 1st Baron Brabourne (1829–1893), British Liberal politician
- Edward Knatchbull-Hugessen, 2nd Baron Brabourne, (1857–1909), British peer and Liberal Party politician
- Eva Knatchbull-Hugessen, (1861–1895), English children's writer and social activist.
- Herbert Knatchbull-Hugessen (1835–1922), British Conservative politician
- Sir Hughe Knatchbull-Hugessen (1886–1971), British diplomat
- William Knatchbull-Hugessen (1837–1864), English cricketer
- Wyndham Knatchbull-Hugessen, 3rd Baron Brabourne (1885–1915), British peer and British Army officer

== See also ==
- Knatchbull, surname
- James K. Hugessen (born 1933), judge serving on the Federal Court of Canada
