= Princess Olga Andreevna Romanoff =

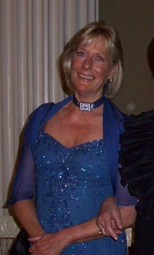
- Princess Olga in 2011

President of the Romanov Family Association
- Tenure: 3 December 2017 – present
- Predecessor: Prince Dimitri Romanov
- Born: 8 April 1950 (age 76); London, United Kingdom
- Spouse: Thomas Mathew (m. 1975; sep. 1989)
- Issue: Nicholas Mathew; Francis Mathew; Alexandra Mathew; Thomas Mathew
Names
- Olga Andreevna Romanoff (Note: Princess Olga's birth name, in English, used spelling conventions of the time—Romanoff instead of Romanova.); Russian: О́льга Андре́евна Рома́нова
- House: Holstein-Gottorp-Romanov
- Father: Prince Andrei Alexandrovich of Russia
- Mother: Nadine Sylvia Ada McDougall

Princess Olga Andreevna Romanoff (Russian: О́льга Андре́евна Рома́нова, romanized: Ólga Andréevna Románova; born 8 April 1950) is a British aristocrat and member of the House of Romanov. She is the grandniece of Nicholas II of Russia and Alexandra Feodorovna, the last emperor and empress of Russia. Princess Olga serves as the president of the Romanov Family Association, an organisation for descendants of the former Russian Imperial House. She is the owner of Provender House, a country house in Kent that she inherited from her mother's family.

== Early life and family ==
Princess Olga is the youngest child of Prince Andrei Alexandrovich of Russia and the only one born of his second marriage in 1942, to Nadine Sylvia Ada McDougall, daughter of Lt. Col. Herbert McDougall of Cawston Manor, member of the Clan MacDougall. Her father was the son of Grand Duke Alexander Mikhailovich of Russia, who belonged to a cadet branch of the Romanovs, and his wife Grand Duchess Xenia Alexandrovna, Tsar Nicholas II's sister. Olga Andreevna uses the English version of her family name, preferring "Romanoff" to "Romanova", the feminine form of her name in Russian. She is known by the title "Princess Olga Andreevna Romanoff".

Educated in her mother's country house Provender, Faversham, Kent, England by private tutors, she was told of her family's tragic imperial heritage in pre-revolutionary Russia as a child by her exiled father. She was presented to society as a debutante in 1968 at a Regency-themed coming-out ball hosted by her parents.

== Adult life ==
She joined the Romanov Family Association (RFA) in 1980 and, with other members, attended the long-delayed interment of Russia's last emperor and empress in St. Petersburg in 1998. On 3 December 2017, nearly a year after the death of Prince Dimitri Romanovich Romanov on the last day of 2016, she was elected president of the RFA. In the interim, the senior male Romanov descendant by primogeniture, her older half-brother Prince Andrew Andreyevich Romanov (born 1923), was chosen Honorary RFA president. Olga intended to return for the centenary memorial in 2018, at which however, Paul Kulikovsky, a great-grandson of Grand Duchess Olga Alexandrovna, and a contingent of other Romanov descendants represented the RFA.

She lives at Provender House in the hamlet of Provender, near Faversham in Kent, where she has restored the 13th century house and opened it to tourists. Having inherited the ageing mansion and 30-acre (12 ha) estate in 2000, she raised the money to have it refurbished by selling what was left of her father's cache of pre-revolutionary artefacts, most of which had long since been sold to the British royal family.

In 2005, she was on Australian Princess (a reality show) giving advice to competitors. During an interview on Channel 4 television's "Royal House of Windsor", she corrected the prevalent view that the fatal abandonment by the British of Tsar Nicholas II, his wife, and children to the Bolsheviks during the Russian Revolution was not due to the callousness of the British government of the day, but to the reluctance of his cousin George V, as was revealed by Kenneth Rose in his biography of the King.

In 2017 she published a memoir, Princess Olga, A Wild and Barefoot Romanov.

She serves alongside Princess Katarina of Yugoslavia as a royal patron of the Queen Charlotte's Ball.

== Marriage and children ==
Once suggested by her mother as a possible bride for her third cousin King Charles III, she married Thomas Mathew (born 8 July 1945, son of Francis Mathew former manager of The Times), in nuptials at the Orthodox Cathedral of the Assumption and at the Brompton Oratory on 1 October 1975. A member of the Irish gentry, he also had homes in England at South Kensington and in the vicinity of Hatchlands Park in Surrey. They separated in 1989, having had issue:

- Nicholas Mathew (b. 6 December 1976);
- Francis-Alexander Mathew (b. 26 September 1978); freelance photographer. 2012 contestant on Ukraine version of The Bachelor. Starred in season 2 of Secret Princes as "Prince Alexander".
- Alexandra Mathew (b. 20 April 1981);
- Thomas Mathew (b. 27 November 1987- 20 April 1989).

== Notes ==
Princess Olga Andreevna Romanoff House of Holstein-Gottorp-Romanov Born: 8 April 1950
Non-profit organization positions
Preceded by Prince Dimitri Romanovich	President of the Romanov Family Association; 5 December 2017 – present	Incumbent
