= Princess Nadine Romanovskya =

British aristocrat

Nadine Romanovskya
- Princess Andrew of Russia
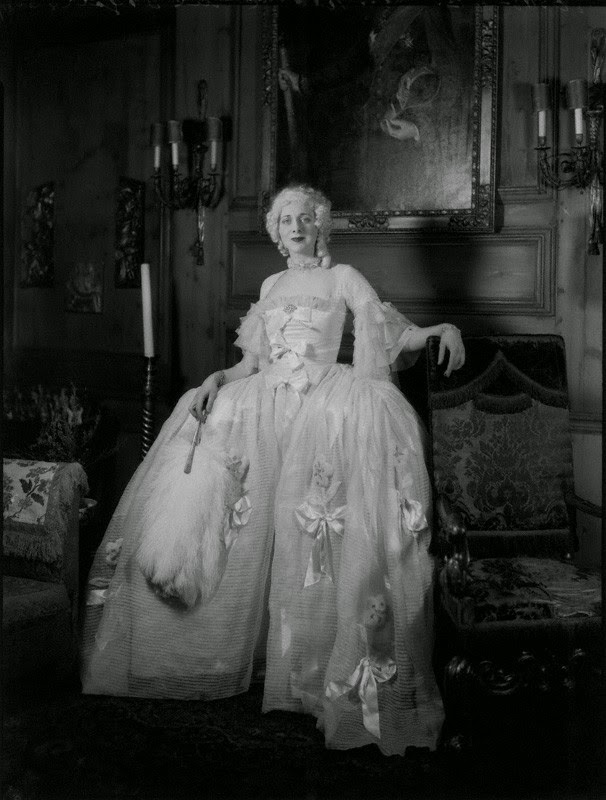
- Princess Romanovskya dressed for a costume ball in 1935
- Born: Nadine Sylvia Ada McDougall; 5 June 1908; London, England, United Kingdom
- Died: 6 June 2000 (aged 92); Provender House, Faversham, Kent, England
- Burial: St Mary Churchyard; Norton, Buckland and Stone
- Spouses: Prince Andrei Alexandrovich of Russia (m. 1942; died 1981)
- Issue: Princess Olga Andreevna
- House: McDougall (by birth); Holstein-Gottorp-Romanov (by marriage)
- Father: Herbert McDougall
- Mother: Sylvia Nordstein

Princess Nadine Romanovskya (née Nadine Sylvia Ada McDougall; 5 June 1908 – 6 June 2000), also known as Princess Andrew of Russia, was a British aristocrat and heiress. She was the owner and châtelaine of Provender House in Kent, which she inherited from her maternal family.

== Early life and family ==
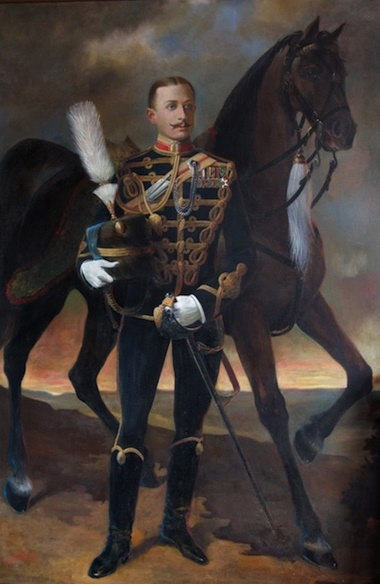
Nadine's father: Lieutenant-Colonel Herbert McDougall of Cawston Manor

Princess Nadine was born Nadine Sylvia Ada McDougall in London on 5 June 1908. A member of Clan MacDougall, she was the eldest of three daughters of Lieutenant-Colonel Herbert McDougall of Cawston Manor and Sylvia Nordstein (née Borgström). Her father was an officer in the British Army and her mother was a Finnish heiress. Nadine's maternal grandparents were the English heiress Constance Paterson Borgström and the Finnish businessman and diplomat Emil Borgström. Her great-grandfather, Henrik Borgström, was a Finnish civil servant. Her father's family were wealthy due to success in the flour-milling business started by Sir John McDougall. Nadine's sister, Pamela, later married George Henry Milles-Lade, 4th Earl Sondes.

She grew up at her family's estate, Provender House, in Kent. The house was noted for having been a hunting lodge of Edward the Black Prince.

Nadine was sent to be educated at a boarding school when she was eight years old.

== Adult life ==
While staying at Balmoral Castle, she was introduced to the exiled Prince Andrei Alexandrovich of Russia, a son of Grand Duke Alexander Mikhailovich of Russia and Grand Duchess Xenia Alexandrovna of Russia. Prince Andrei was the nephew of Tsar Nicholas II of Russia and the great-grandson of Tsar Nicholas I of Russia.

She and Prince Andrei announced their engagement on 18 June 1942. They married in an Anglican ceremony officiated by the Archbishop of Canterbury, William Temple, at St Mary Church in Norton, Kent on 21 September 1942. She was attended by three pages: her nephew, Viscount Throwley; Robert Mercer, nephew of Sir Neil Ritchie; and Jeremy Pemberton, son of Colonel Douglas Pemberton. Nadine wore a white satin dress with court train and a Russian pearl headdress with a tulle veil. A Russian Orthodox wedding followed in Sheldwich, presided by Archimandrite Nicholas, the former tutor of the children of Nicholas II. As her father was serving in Africa at the time of her wedding, she was given away in the Anglican ceremony by her uncle, Major Arthur McDougall DSO, and by Sir Robert Hodgson in the Russian Orthodox ceremony. A reception was held at her sister and brother-in-law's home, Lees Court.

Upon her marriage, she was known as Her Serene Highness Princess Andrew Romanovskya of Russia. Nadine was Prince Andrei's second wife, his first wife Elisabetta di Sasso Ruffo died during World War II. They had one daughter together, Princess Olga Andreevna, who was born in 1950.

In 1949, she and her husband moved into Provender House, which she inherited from her mother. The house had previously been requisitioned by the British Army during World War II but was later returned to Nadine. As the châtelaine of Provender House, she redecorated the house and painted fireplaces in cream color.

Nadine refused to send her daughter to school, as she had hated her own schooling, instead hiring private tutors in the home. She tried to arrange a betrothal between her daughter and Charles, Prince of Wales, who was a relative of her husband. In 1967, she ensured her daughter was listed in Harper's Bazaar as one of six foreign princesses that were suitable candidates to wed the Prince of Wales.

Nadine died at Provender House on 6 June 2000. She was buried at St Mary Churchyard in Norton, Buckland and Stone.
