= William Knatchbull-Hugessen =

English cricketer

Personal information
- Full name: William Western Knatchbull-Hugessen
- Born: 23 May 1837; Mersham Hatch, Kent
- Died: 6 September 1864 (aged 27); St Leonards-on-Sea, Sussex
- Batting: Right-handed
- Relatives: Sir Edward Knatchbull, 9th Baronet (father); Edward Knatchbull-Hugessen, 1st Baron Brabourne (brother); Henry Knatchbull (uncle); Cecil Knatchbull-Hugessen, 4th Baron Brabourne (nephew)

Domestic team information
- Years: Team
- 1856–1860: Gentlemen of Kent
- 1859: Kent
- FC debut: 29 July 1858 Gentlemen of Kent v Gentlemen of England
- Last FC: 25 July 1859 Kent v Middlesex
- Source: CricInfo, 1 August 2021

William Western Knatchbull-Hugessen (23 May 1837 – 6 September 1864) was an English amateur cricketer who played in three first-class cricket matches in 1858 and 1859.

== Biography ==
The youngest son of Sir Edward Knatchbull, 9th Baronet and his second wife Fanny, Knatchbull-Hugessen was born William Western Knatchbull at the family estate of Mersham-le-Hatch near Ashford in Kent in 1837. Hugessen was added to the family name following the death of Sir Edward in 1849 as a condition of the will. He was educated at Eton College before going up to Magdalen College, Oxford in 1855.

Despite not playing for either the Eton or Oxford cricket teams, Knatchbull-Huggesen played cricket for the Gentlemen of Kent team between 1856 and 1860, generally as a wicket-keeper. He made two appearances in matches which have been given first-class status, both in 1858 against Gentlemen of England teams. He was a member of the management committee which set up the Maidstone based Kent County Club in 1859 and played one first-class match that year. In his three first-class matches he scored a total of 33 runs with his highest score of nine coming in his match for Kent. He did not bowl.

At the 1861 census, Knatchbull-Hugessen was farming at Provender House at Norton, close to Faversham in Kent, an estate which had been in the Hugessen family since the 17th century. He resigned from the Kent management committee in 1863 due to ill health and died of tuberculosis at St Leonards-on-Sea in Sussex in September 1864, aged 27. A memorial tablet was erected in the church of St John the Baptist in Mersham.

== Family ==
Knatchbull-Hugessen's brother, Edward became the first Baron Brabourne in 1880. Edward's son Cecil, who later became the fourth Baron Brabourne, also played first-class cricket, mainly playing for Cambridge University, but also made one appearance for Kent. His uncle, Henry Knatchbull had played for Kent teams between 1827 and 1848 whilst Knatchbull-Hugessen's brother, Henry Thomas, took his place on the Kent management committee and was the club's president in 1880.

== Bibliography ==
- Carlaw, Derek (2020). Kent County Cricketers, A to Z: Part One (1806–1914) (PDF). Cardiff: ACS.
