= Henry Knatchbull =

English cricketer and clergyman

Henry Edward Knatchbull (30 August 1808 – 31 August 1876) was an English clergyman and amateur cricketer who played top level matches in the 19th century.

Knatchbull was a son of Sir Edward Knatchbull, 8th Baronet and his third wife Mary Hawkins. He was born in 1808 at Mersham Hatch in Kent and educated at Winchester College. He graduated from Wadham College, Oxford in 1832 and went into the Church of England clergy, initially as a curate at Billingford in Norfolk. In 1833 he was appointed vicar of North Elmham in Norfolk before moving in 1867 to be vicar at Campsea Ashe in Suffolk. He remained at Campsea Ashe until he died there in 1876, aged 68.

He married Pleasance Bagge in 1835. The couple had no children, his wife dying in 1865.

He played in some important matches for a range of teams, including Oxford University and the Gentlemen of Kent. He made one appearance for Kent in 1848. He also played for the Gentlemen against the Players, Marylebone Cricket Club (MCC), Cambridge University, and for both Norfolk and Suffolk.

== Bibliography ==
- Carlaw, Derek (2020). Kent County Cricketers, A to Z: Part One (1806–1914) (PDF). Cardiff: ACS.
