= Prince Dimitri Romanov =

Prince of Russia

Dimitri Romanovich Romanov
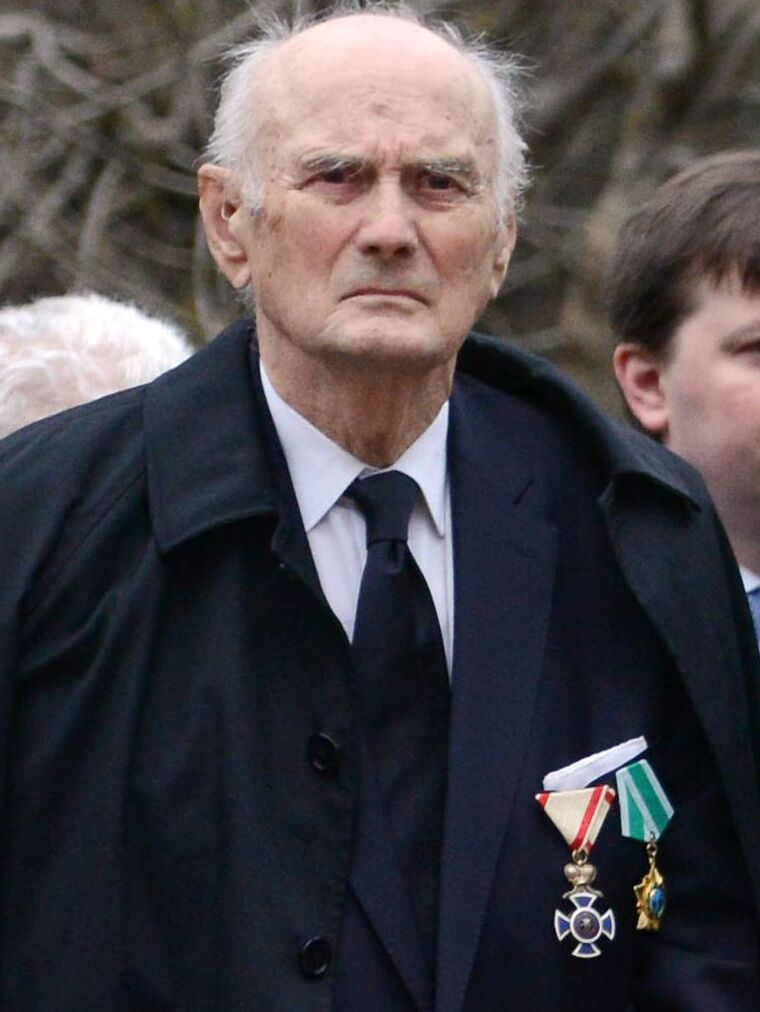
- Pictured in 2015

Head of the House of Romanov (disputed)
- Time: 15 September 2014 – 31 December 2016
- Predecessor: Prince Nicholas Romanovich
- Successor: Prince Andrew Andreevich

President of the Romanov Family Association
- Reign: 15 September 2014 – 31 December 2016
- Predecessor: Prince Nicholas Romanovich
- Successor: Princess Olga Andreevna
- Born: 17 May 1926; Cap d'Antibes, France
- Died: 31 December 2016 (aged 90); Copenhagen, Denmark
- Spouses: Jeanne von Kauffmann (m. 1959; died 1989) Dorrit Reventlow (m. 1993)
Names
- Dimitri Romanovich Romanov
- House: Holstein-Gottorp-Romanov
- Father: Prince Roman Petrovich of Russia
- Mother: Countess Praskovia Sheremeteva

Dimitri Romanovich Romanov (Russian: Дмитрий Романович Романов; 17 May 1926 – 31 December 2016) was a descendant of Russia's former ruling dynasty, a banker, philanthropist, and author. He was also a claimant to the headship of the Imperial House of Russia. At his death, the male line of the Nicholaevich branch of the Romanov family died out.

== Early life ==
Dimitri Romanovich Romanov was born on 17 May 1926 in Cap d'Antibes, France, the second son of Prince Roman Petrovich of Russia and Countess Praskovia Sheremeteva. His older brother was Prince Nicholas Romanovich. Through his paternal lineage, he was a great-great-grandson of Emperor Nicholas I of Russia (1796–1855) and his consort, Princess Charlotte of Prussia, who founded the Nikolaevichi branch of the Russian Imperial Family.

Romanov spent the first ten years of his life in Antibes, France, where he received a traditional Russian education. In 1936 his family moved to Italy, where he continued his education and for a time lived at the Royal Palace in Rome. In 1946 his family moved to Egypt, where they lived for a number of years before returning to Italy. He took part in the ship tour organized by Queen Frederica and her husband King Paul of Greece in 1954, which became known as the “Cruise of the Kings” and was attended by over 100 royals from all over Europe. In 1960 he moved to Denmark, where he worked for a number of banks including the Danske Bank, where he was an executive until his retirement in 1993. He was fluent in Russian, French, English, Danish, and Italian.

== Marriages ==
Romanov was married twice. His first wife was Johanna von Kauffmann (1936–1989), whom he married in Copenhagen on 21 January 1959. After being widowed in 1989, he married Dorrit Reventlow (born 1942) in Kostroma on 28 July 1993. His second marriage was the first time a Romanov had been married in Russia since the fall of the dynasty.

Dimitri Romanovich died in Denmark on 31 December 2016, as reported by his wife Theodora (Dorrit). He had been urgently admitted to hospital the week before after a sharp deterioration in health status.

== Charity work ==
Since his retirement Dimitri became involved in a number of charitable endeavours. In June 1992 he was one of seven Romanov princes who met in Paris where they decided to create the Romanov Fund for Russia with the task of carrying out charitable acts in post-communist Russia. He visited Russia in July 1993 on a fact finding mission to decide on what areas the charity should focus. Prince Dimitri served as chairman of the Romanov Fund for Russia since its creation.

He was also chairman of the Prince Dimitri Romanov Charity Fund, which he founded in 2006.

== Romanov Family Association ==
Dimitri was a member of the Romanov Family Association since 1979, the year of its creation, and served as a committee member. In July 1998, he joined other members of the Imperial family in St. Petersburg to attend the funeral of the last Russian emperor to reign, Nicholas II, and his family. In March 2003 the then Bulgarian Prime Minister, and former Tsar, Simeon Saxe-Coburg-Gotha invited Dimitri to attend events celebrating the liberation of Bulgaria from Ottoman rule during the Russo-Turkish War of 1877–1878.

In September 2006 after a successful lobbying campaign of the Danish royal family and President Vladimir Putin of Russia, he arranged for the remains of Dowager Empress Maria Feodorovna to be moved from Denmark, where she died in exile, to Russia so she could be buried alongside her husband Emperor Alexander III. After attending the divine service for Maria Feodorovna at the Roskilde Cathedral in Denmark, Prince Dimitri accompanied her remains on the Danish naval ship that transferred them to Russia. After their arrival, Prince Dimitri with other descendants of the Imperial family attended the reburial service in Russia.

As a descendant of the Electress Sophia of Hanover he was also eligible to succeed to the British throne.

== Honours ==
- Denmark : Order of the Dannebrog
- Russia :
  - Medal "In Commemoration of the 300th Anniversary of Saint Petersburg"
  - Order of Friendship (20 June 2011)
  - Order of Alexander Nevsky (6 October 2016)

=== Dynastic orders ===
- (Kingdom of Montenegro) Montenegrin Royal Family :
  - Knight of the Order of Saint Peter of Cetinje
  - Knight of the Order of Petrovic Njegos
  - Grand Cross of the Order of Prince Danilo I (4 June 2005)

== Bibliography ==
- The Orders, Medals and History of Greece. Balkan Heritage. 1987. ISBN 87-981267-1-7.
- The Orders, Medals and History of the Kingdom of Bulgaria. Balkan Heritage. 1982. ISBN 87-981267-0-9.
- The Orders, Medals and History of Imperial Russia. Balkan Heritage. 2000. ISBN 87-981267-4-1.
- The Orders, Medals and History of the Kingdoms of Serbia and Yugoslavia. Balkan Heritage. 1996. ISBN 87-981267-3-3.
- The Orders, Medals, and History of Montenegro. Balkan Heritage. 1988. ISBN 87-981267-2-5.
- The Adventures of Mikti: the memoirs of a teddy bear. Balkan Heritage. 1999. ISBN 87-981267-6-8.

== Ancestry ==
Ancestors of Prince Dimitri Romanov

16. Tsar Nicholas I of Russia
8. Grand Duke Nicholas Nikolaevich of Russia
17. Princess Charlotte of Prussia
4. Grand Duke Peter Nikolaevich of Russia
18. Duke Peter Georgievich of Oldenburg
9. Duchess Alexandra Petrovna of Oldenburg
19. Princess Therese of Nassau-Weilburg
2. Prince Roman Petrovich of Russia
20. Mirko Petrović-Njegoš
10. King Nicholas I of Montenegro
21. Anastasija Martinović
5. Princess Milica of Montenegro
22. Voivode Petar Vukotić
11. Milena Vukotić
23. Jelena Voivodić
1. Prince Dimitri Romanov
24. Count Dmitri Nikolaevich Sheremetev
12. Count Sergei Dmitrievich Sheremetev
25. Anna Sergeievna Sheremeteva
6. Count Dmitri Sergeievich Sheremetev
26. Prince Pavel Petrovich Vyazemsky
13. Princess Ekaterina Pavlovna Vyazemskaya
27. Maria Arkadyevna Stolypina
3. Countess Praskovia Dmitrievna Sheremeteva
28. Count Ivan Illarionovich Vorontsov-Dashkov
14. Count Illarion Ivanovich Vorontsov-Dashkov
29. Aleksandra Kirillovna Naryshkina
7. Countess Irina Illarionovna Vorontsov-Dashkov
30. Count Andrei Pavlovich Shuvalov
15. Countess Elizabeth Andreevna Shuvalov
31. Sofia Mikhailovna Vorontsova

Prince Dimitri Romanov House of Holstein-Gottorp-Romanov Born: 17 May 1926 Died: 31 December 2016
Titles in pretence
Preceded by Prince Nicholas Romanovich	— TITULAR — Head of the House of Romanov (disputed); 15 September 2014 – 31 December 2016	Succeeded by Prince Andrew Andreevich
Non-profit organization positions
Preceded by Prince Nicholas Romanovich	President of the Romanov Family Association; 2014–2016	Succeeded by Princess Olga Andreevna
