= Alexandra Pavlovna Galitzine =

Russian princess (1905–2006)

Alexandra Galitzine
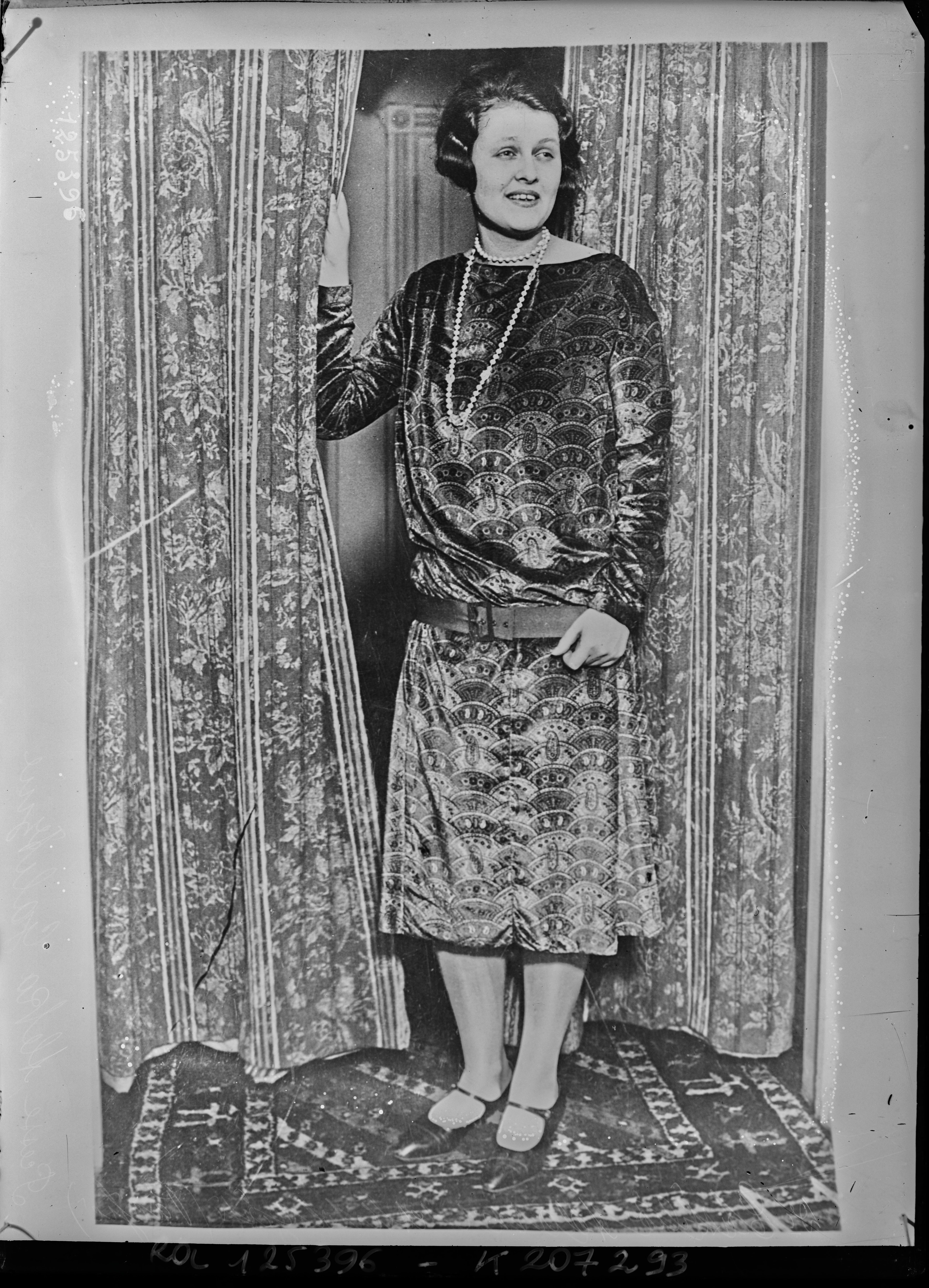
- Galitzine in 1927
- Born: May 7, 1905; Novgorod, Russian Empire
- Died: December 5, 2006 (aged 101); Lake Forest, Illinois, United States
- Noble family: House of Golitsyn
- Spouses: Prince Rostislav Alexandrovich of Russia (m. 1928; div. 1944); Lester Armour
- Issue: Prince Rostislav Rostislavovich
- Father: Prince Pavel Galitzine
- Mother: Alexandra Nikolaiyevna Mestchersky

Alexandra "Aleka" Pavlovna Galitzine Armour (May 7, 1905 – December 5, 2006) was a princess of the House of Golitsyn and the former wife of Prince Rostislav Alexandrovich of Russia.

== Early life ==
Alexandra Pavlovna Galitzine, known as Aleka, was born on May 7, 1905, at her family's estate in the province of Novgorod. She was the youngest of seven children born to Prince Pavel Galitzine (1856–1916) and Alexandra Nikolaiyevna Mestchersky (1864–1941). Her father was a grand marshal of the nobility of Novgorod and a member of the Council of State for the Royal Court of Nicholas II.

== Exile ==
During the Russian Revolution, soldiers scoured the countryside for Tsarist aristocrats. At the Galitzine family estate in Marijno, soldiers found 14-year-old Galitzine along with her 16-year-old brother Nicholas and their mother Alexandra alone in the 100-room house with their few remaining servants. She later recalled " I remember so well the day five soldiers appeared at our house near Saint Petersburg. Nick’s teeth chattered and so did mine". The two children were locked in their mother's sitting room for three days, while the soldiers searched the house and took everything of value. The family attempted to escape Russia by crossing the Finnish border and barely escaped execution at the frontier. After another failed attempt, they were imprisoned for three weeks with a Hungarian family of ten, in a single room furnished only with straw. Eventually, Galitzine and Nicholas were sent to Soviet colonies for criminal children. When she was discharged, Galitzine recalled "our condition was desperate. We had no money. All we could do was sell a dress or a pair of shoes to get a little food". Posing as a stenographer, she managed to board a Red Cross train to Moscow, where she reunited with some of her family. In 1923, the Galitzine obtained permission to leave Russia, Aleka fled to London, where she first met Prince Rostislav Alexandrovich of Russia, the son of Grand Duchess Xenia Alexandrovna of Russia, and a nephew of Tsar Nicholas II. From London, she moved to Chicago to be with her older brother Nicholas, where she was quickly integrated into society. However, due to a lack of money, Galitzine started working at department store Marshall Field's. Rostislav, who had followed her to Chicago, also began work at a department store. When the two married on September 1, 1928, the local newspaper commented on the marriage between a "royal shopgirl" and a "royal clerk". Together, Galitzine and Rostislav had one child, Prince Rostislav Romanov, born in 1938. After her marriage, she opened her own department shop. They divorced on November 9, 1944. Galitzine married for a second time to Lester Armour (1895–1970) in New York.

== Later life and death ==
From 1976 to 1978, Galitzine served as the President of the Women's Board of the Rehabilitation Institute of Chicago. She was also heavily involved with fundraising for the Rush Medical Center.

Galitzine died in her Lake Forest home on December 5, 2006, at the age of 101.
