= Prince Dmitri Alexandrovich of Russia =

Russian prince

Prince Dmitri Alexandrovich
- Pictured in the 1930s

President of the Romanov Family Association
- In office 1979 – 7 July 1980
- Preceded by: Office Created
- Succeeded by: Prince Vasili Alexandrovich

Personal details
- Born: 15 August 1901 Gatchina Palace, Gatchina, Russian Empire
- Died: 7 July 1980 (aged 78) London, England
- Spouse(s): Countess Marina Sergeievna Golenistcheva-Koutouzova (m. 1931; div. 1947) Sheila MacKellar Chisholm (m. 1954; died 1969)
- Children: Princess Nadejda Dimitrievna
- Parents: Grand Duke Alexander Mikhailovich of Russia (father); Grand Duchess Xenia Alexandrovna of Russia (mother)

Prince Dmitri Alexandrovich of Russia (15 August [O.S. 2 August] 1901 – 7 July 1980) was the fourth son and fifth child of Grand Duke Alexander Mikhailovich of Russia and Grand Duchess Xenia Alexandrovna of Russia. He was a nephew of Tsar Nicholas II of Russia.

== Early life ==
Prince Dmitri Alexandrovich Romanov was born at the Gatchina Palace, near Saint Petersburg, Russia on 15 August 1901. He was the fourth son and fifth child among seven siblings. His parents, Grand Duke Alexander Mikhailovich (1866–1933) and Grand Duchess Xenia Alexandrovna (1875–1960), were first cousins once removed. Consequently, Prince Dmitri was the great-grandson of Tsar Nicholas I (from his father's side) while the great-great-grandson of the same Tsar Nicholas I (from his mother's side), the grandson of Tsar Alexander III and the nephew of Tsar Nicholas II.

During the Russian Revolution Prince Dmitri was imprisoned along with his parents and grandmother the Dowager Empress at Dulber, in the Crimea. He escaped the fate of a number of his Romanov cousins who were killed by the Bolsheviks when he was freed by German troops in 1918. He left Russia on 11 April 1919, at the age of seventeen, aboard the Royal Navy ship HMS Marlborough to attend to Malta where they spent nine months before settling to England.

== Exile ==
In exile, Prince Dmitri lived between England and France. He had a varied career. In the late 1920s he emigrated to the United States where he worked as a stockbroker in Manhattan. He returned to Europe in the early 1930s. For a brief period in the 1930s, he managed Coco Chanel's shop at Biarritz.

It was through Chanel that he met a Russian aristocrat who worked as model for her fashion house: Countess Marina Sergeievna Golenistcheva-Koutouzova (20 November 1912 – 7 January 1969). She was the second daughter of Count Sergei Alexandrovich Golenishchev-Kutuzov (1885 – 1950) and his wife Countess Maria Alexandrovna, born Chernysheva-Bezobrazova (1890 – 1960). Countess Marina was a direct descendant of sisters Anastasia Romanova, the wife of Prince Boris Mikhailovich Lykov-Obolenskiy, one of the Seven Boyars of 1610, and Marfa Romanova, the wife of Prince Boris Keybulatovich Tcherkasskiy. Anastasia and Marfa were the daughters of Nikita Romanovich (Russian: Никита Романович; born c. 1522 – 23 April 1586), also known as Nikita Romanovich Zakharyin-Yuriev, who was a prominent boyar of the Tsardom of Russia. His grandson Michael I (Tsar 1613-1645) founded the Romanov dynasty of Russian tsars. Anastasia and Marfa were the paternal aunts of Tsar Michael I of Russia of Russia and the paternal nieces of Tsaritsa Anastasia Romanovna Zakharyina-Yurieva of Russia. After the revolution, Marina and her family moved to Kislovodsk and later to Crimea, where her father served as head of the Yalta County. In August 1920 the family was evacuated to Istanbul and then to Paris. In the French capital, Marina began to work for Chanel.

Prince Dmitri fell in love with her and they married in Paris on 25 October 1931. The wedding attracted a lot of attention and the bride wore a Chanel wedding dress.

The couple had one daughter :

- Princess Nadejda Dmitrievna (4 July 1933 – 17 September 2002). Nadejda married Anthony Allen, with whom she had two daughters and one son: Penelope, Marina and Alexander; after divorcing Allen, she married William Hall Clark.

During World War II, Prince Dmitri served as a Lieutenant Commander in the Royal Naval Volunteer Reserve. After the war, he became secretary of the travelers club in Paris.

In 1947 he divorced Princess Marina who moved with their daughter to the United States. In 1949 she remarried Otto de Neufville (1898–1971), a descendant of a French-German aristocratic family. Marina Sergeievna Golenistcheva-Koutouzova died on 7 January 1969 in Sharon, Connecticut.

During the 1950s, Prince Dmitri studied wine-making and worked as the European sales representative for a whisky firm in London. As his ex-wife did, Prince Dmitri also remarried. His second wife was the Dowager Lady Milbanke, née Margaret Sheila MacKellar Chisholm (9 September 1898 – 13 October 1969). Born in rural New South Wales, Australia, she was married, firstly, to Francis St Clair-Erskine, Lord Loughborough (heir to the 5th Earl of Rosslyn), and secondly, to Sir John Milbanke, 11th baronet. She married Prince Dmitri on 20 October 1954. No children were born of this marriage. The couple lived modestly in Belgravia, in central London. Princess Dmitri died on 13 October 1969, and was buried in a chapel near Edinburgh, next to her youngest son, Peter St. Clair-Erskine, who had died, at the age of twenty, in 1939.

Following the creation of the Romanov Family Association in 1979, Prince Dmitri was chosen as its first president serving until his death a year later in England.

== Ancestry ==
Ancestors of Prince Dmitri Alexandrovich of Russia

8. Nicholas I of Russia
4. Grand Duke Michael Nikolaevich of Russia
9. Princess Charlotte of Prussia
2. Grand Duke Alexander Mikhailovich of Russia
10. Leopold, Grand Duke of Baden
5. Princess Cecilie of Baden
11. Princess Sophie of Sweden
1. Prince Dmitri Alexandrovich of Russia
12. Alexander II of Russia
6. Alexander III of Russia
13. Princess Marie of Hesse and by Rhine
3. Grand Duchess Xenia Alexandrovna of Russia
14. Christian IX of Denmark
7. Princess Dagmar of Denmark
15. Princess Louise of Hesse-Kassel

== Notes ==
Prince Dmitri Alexandrovich of Russia House of Holstein-Gottorp-Romanov Cadet branch of the House of Oldenburg Born: 15 August 1901 Died: 7 July 1980
Non-profit organization positions
New institution	President of the Romanov Family Association; 1979 - 1980	Succeeded by Prince Vasili Alexandrovich of Russia
