= Prince Roman Petrovich of Russia =

Russian prince (1896–1978)

Prince Roman Petrovich
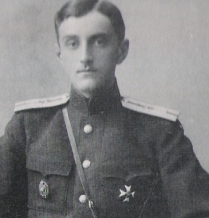
- Prince Roman in 1917.
- Born: 17 October 1896; Peterhof Palace, Saint Petersburg Governorate, Russian Empire
- Died: 23 October 1978 (aged 82); Rome, Italy
- Spouse: Countess Praskovia Sheremeteva (m. 1921)
- Issue: Prince Nicholas Romanovich; Prince Dimitri Romanovich
Names
- Roman Petrovich Romanov
- House: Holstein-Gottorp-Romanov
- Father: Grand Duke Peter Nikolaevich of Russia
- Mother: Princess Milica of Montenegro

Prince Roman Petrovich of Russia (17 October [O.S. 5 October] 1896 – 23 October 1978) was a member of the House of Romanov.

== Biography ==
Prince Roman Petrovich was born in the Peterhof Palace in St. Petersburg the only son of Grand Duke Peter Nikolaevich of Russia and his wife Princess Milica of Montenegro, daughter of King Nicholas I of Montenegro. Prince Roman belonged to the Nikolaevichi branch of the Russian Imperial Family which was founded by his grandfather Grand Duke Nicholas Nikolaevich.

In 1916 having graduated from the Nicholas Engineering Academy of Kiev, Prince Roman was posted to serve in a Caucasian Sappers Regiment on the Turkish front. Following the abdication of Emperor Nicholas II, Prince Roman resided at his father's Dulber estate in the Crimea and in April 1919 he left Russia on the British battleship HMS Marlborough.

In 1941 he was offered and refused the crown of the newly established Italian puppet state, the Kingdom of Montenegro.

== Marriage and issue ==
Prince Roman was married on 16 November 1921 at Cap d'Antibes, France to a Russian noblewoman, Countess Praskovia Dmitrievna Sheremeteva (18 October 1901– 21 December 1980). Together, they had two sons:

- Nicholas Romanovich, Prince of Russia (1922–2014)
- Prince Dimitri Romanovich of Russia (1926–2016)

== Ancestry ==
Ancestors of Prince Roman Petrovich of Russia

8. Nicholas I of Russia
4. Grand Duke Nicholas Nikolaevich of Russia
9. Princess Charlotte of Prussia
2. Grand Duke Peter Nikolaevich of Russia
10. Duke Peter of Oldenburg
5. Duchess Alexandra of Oldenburg
11. Princess Therese of Nassau-Weilburg
1. Prince Roman Petrovich of Russia
12. Mirko Petrović-Njegoš, Grand Voivode of Grahovo
6. Nicholas I of Montenegro
13. Anastasija Martinović
3. Princess Milica of Montenegro
14. Voivode Petar Vukotić
7. Milena Vukotić
15. Jelena Vojvodić
