= Prince Rostislav Alexandrovich of Russia =

Russian prince (1902–1978)

Rostislav Alexandrovich Romanoff
- Prince of the Imperial Blood
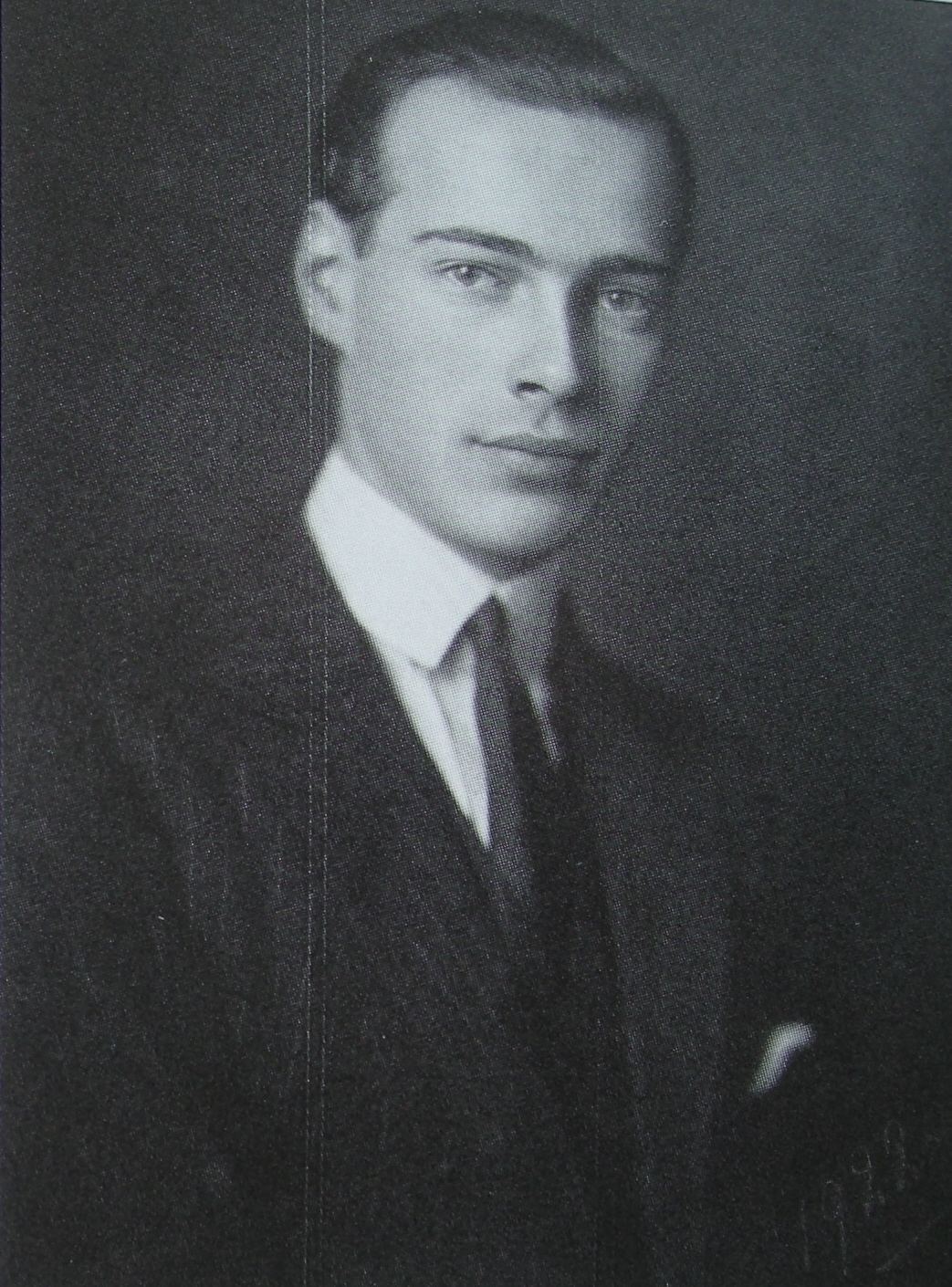
- Pictured in 1922
- Born: 24 November 1902; Ai-Todor, Crimea, Russian Empire
- Died: 31 July 1978 (aged 75); Cannes, France
- Spouse: Princess Alexandra Pavlovna Galitzine (m. 1928; div. 1944) Alice Eilken (m. 1944; div. 1951) Hedwig Maria Gertrud Eva von Chappuis (m. 1954)
- Issue Detail: Prince Rostislav Rostislavovich; Prince Nicholas Rostislavovich
- House: Holstein-Gottorp-Romanov
- Father: Grand Duke Alexander Mikhailovich of Russia
- Mother: Grand Duchess Xenia Alexandrovna of Russia

Prince of the Imperial Blood Rostislav Alexandrovich of Russia (24 November [O.S. 11 November] 1902 – 31 July 1978) was the fifth son and sixth child of Grand Duke Alexander Mikhailovich and Grand Duchess Xenia Alexandrovna. He was a nephew of Tsar Nicholas II, Russia's last tsar.

== Russian prince ==
Prince Rostislav Alexandrovich was the sixth child and fifth son of Grand Duke Alexander Mikhailovich 'Sandro' (1866–1933) and the Grand Duchess Xenia Alexandrovna (1875–1960). His parents were paternal first cousins once removed. Consequently, Prince Rostislav was the great-grandson of Tsar Nicholas I (from his father's side), also the great-great-grandson of the same Tsar Nicholas I (from his mother's one), the grandson of Tsar Alexander III and the nephew of Tsar Nicholas II. Prince Rostislav was the favorite cousin of Alexei Nikolaevich, Tsarevich of Russia.

During the Russian Revolution Prince Rostislav was imprisoned along with his parents and grandmother the Dowager Empress at Dulber, in the Crimea. He escaped the fate of a number of his Romanov cousins who were murdered by the Bolsheviks when he was freed by German troops in 1918. He left Russia in 1919 aboard the Royal Navy ship HMS Marlborough for Malta, where they spent nine months before moving to England and later settling in Cannes, France.

== Family ==
Rostislav was married three times. He married first Princess Alexandra Pavlovna Galitzine (7 May 1905 – 5 December 2006) on 1 September 1928 in Chicago. They had one child before divorcing in 1944. She remarried to Lester Armour.

- Prince Rostislav Rostislavovich (1938–1999) married firstly to Stephena Verdel Cook with whom he had a daughter, Princess Stephena (b. 1963). Secondly to Christia Ipsen, with whom he had three children: Princess Alexandra (b. 1983), Prince Rostislav Rostislavovich (b. 1985) and Prince Nikita (b. 1987).

Rostislav married Alice Eilken (30 May 1923 – 21 October 1996) on 24 November 1944. The couple had one child before they divorced on 11 April 1951.

- Prince Nicholas Rostislavovich (9 September 1945 – 9 November 2000) the owner of a direct mail business.

Rostislav married Hedwig Maria Gertrud Eva von Chappuis (6 December 1905 – 9 January 1997) on 19 November 1954. No children were born of this marriage.

It is often alleged that Rostislav's marriage with Princess Alexandra Galitzina would have been morganatic. However, holds that it was as acceptable dynastically as the Bagrationi marriage of Vasili's cousin, Vladimir Kirillovich. Since the extinction of the Korecki family in the 17th century, the Golitsyns [Galitzin] have claimed dynastic seniority in the House of Gediminas. The Gediminids were a dynasty of monarchs of Grand Duchy of Lithuania that reigned from the 14th to the 16th century and Emperor Peter I had permitted the Golitsyns to incorporate the emblem of the Grand Duchy of Lithuania into their coat of arms.

His first wife, Princess Alexandra, was a member of the House of Galitzine. Princess Alexandra was a direct descendant of sisters Anastasia Romanova, the wife of Prince Boris Mikhailovich Lykov-Obolenskiy, one of the Seven Boyars of 1610, and Marfa Romanova, the wife of Prince Boris Keybulatovich Tcherkasskiy. Anastasia and Marfa were the daughters of Nikita Romanovich (Russian: Никита Романович; born c. 1522 – 23 April 1586), also known as Nikita Romanovich Zakharyin-Yuriev, who was a prominent boyar of the Tsardom of Russia. His grandson Michael I (Tsar 1613-1645) founded the Romanov dynasty of Russian tsars. Anastasia and Marfa were the paternal aunts of Tsar Michael I of Russia and the paternal nieces of Tsaritsa Anastasia Romanovna Zakharyina-Yurieva of Russia.

== Ancestry ==
Ancestors of Prince Rostislav Alexandrovich of Russia

8. Nicholas I of Russia
4. Grand Duke Michael Nikolaevich of Russia
9. Princess Charlotte of Prussia
2. Grand Duke Alexander Mikhailovich of Russia
10. Leopold I, Grand Duke of Baden
5. Princess Cecilie of Baden
11. Princess Sofia of Sweden
1. Prince Rostislav Alexandrovich of Russia
12. Alexander II of Russia
6. Alexander III of Russia
13. Princess Marie of Hesse
3. Grand Duchess Xenia Alexandrovna of Russia
14. Christian IX of Denmark
7. Princess Dagmar of Denmark
15. Princess Louise of Hesse-Kassel (or Hesse-Cassel)
