= Grand Duke Alexander Mikhailovich of Russia =

Russian grand duke and naval officer (1866–1933)

Grand Duke Alexander Mikhailovich
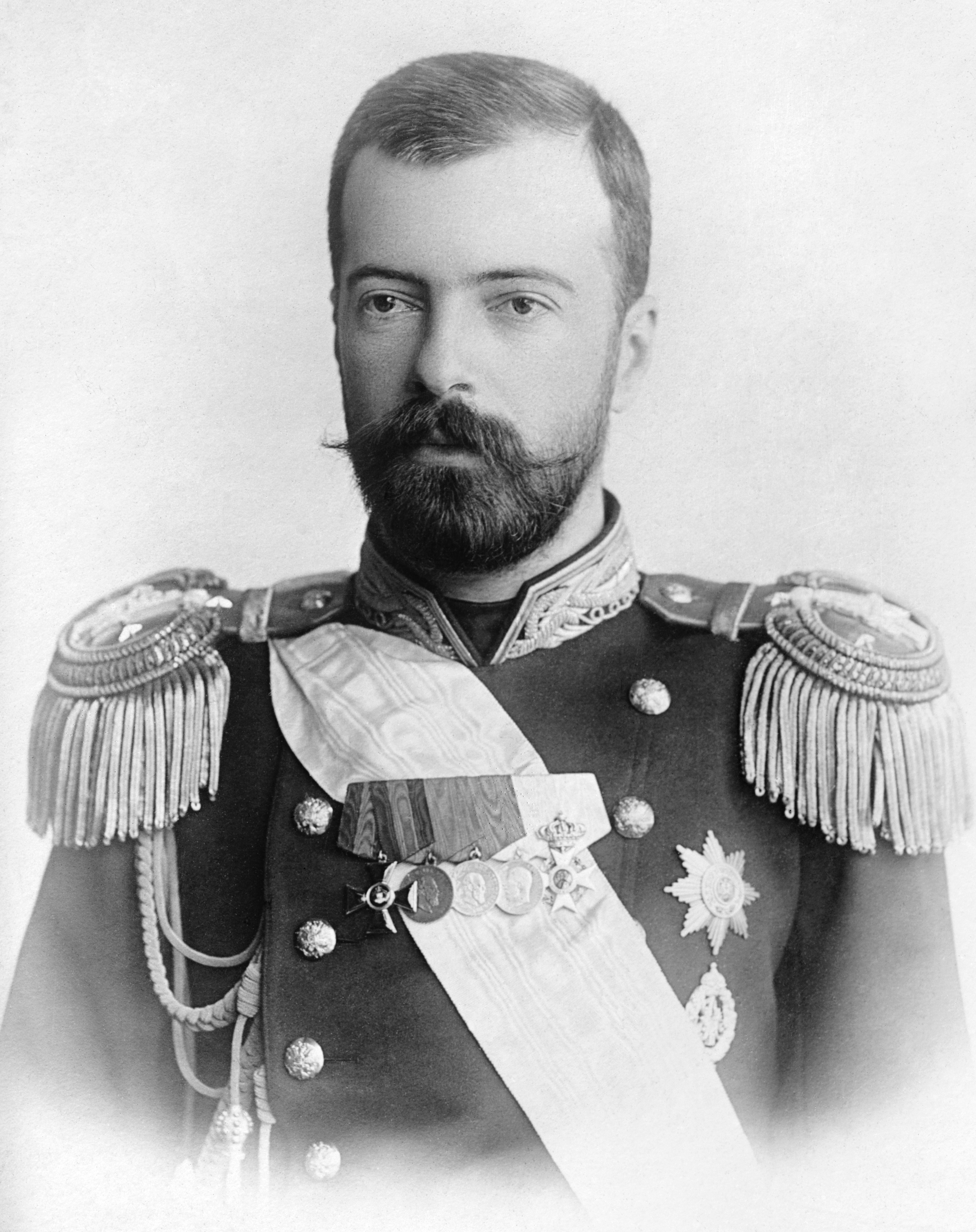
- Grand Duke Alexander, 1890s
- Born: 13 April 1866; Tiflis, Tiflis Governorate, Caucasus Viceroyalty, Russian Empire
- Died: 26 February 1933 (aged 66); Villa Sainte Thérèse, Roquebrune-Cap-Martin, France
- Burial: Cimetière de Roquebrune-Cap-Martin
- Spouse: Grand Duchess Xenia Alexandrovna of Russia (m. 1894)
- Issue: Princess Irina Alexandrovna; Prince Andrei Alexandrovich; Prince Feodor Alexandrovich; Prince Nikita Alexandrovich; Prince Dmitri Alexandrovich; Prince Rostislav Alexandrovich; Prince Vasili Alexandrovich
- House: Holstein-Gottorp-Romanov
- Father: Grand Duke Michael Nikolaevich of Russia
- Mother: Princess Cecilie of Baden

Grand Duke Alexander Mikhailovich of Russia (Russian: Александр Михайлович, romanized: Aleksandr Mikhailovich; 13 April 1866 – 26 February 1933) was a Russian grand duke and dynast of the House of Romanov. He was also a naval officer, author, explorer, as well as the first cousin once removed, brother-in-law and advisor of Emperor Nicholas II.

== Early life ==
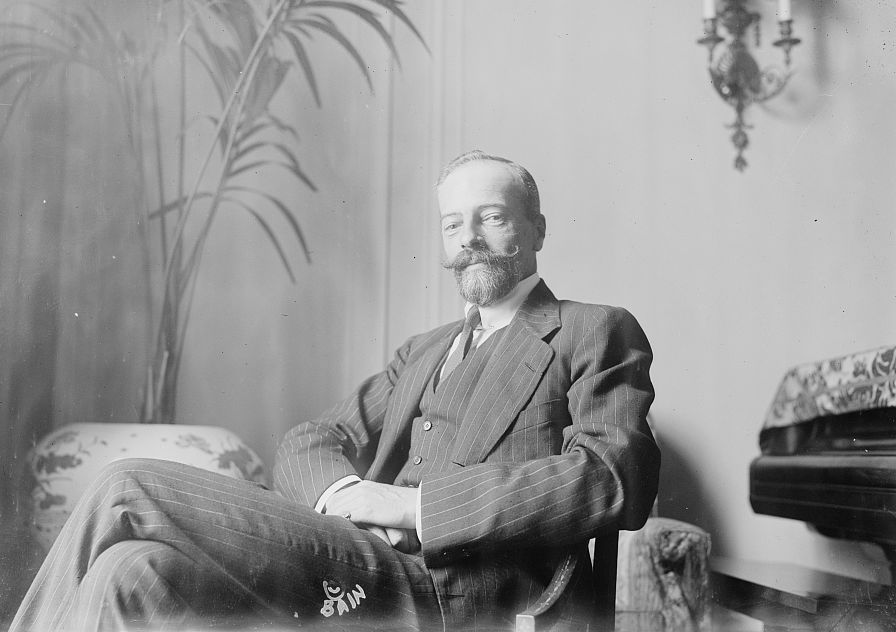
Grand Duke Alexander Mikhailovich c. 1910-1915

Alexander was born in Tiflis, in the Tiflis Governorate of the Russian Empire (present-day Georgia). He was the son of Grand Duke Michael Nikolaevich of Russia, the youngest son of Nicholas I of Russia, and Grand Duchess Olga Feodorovna (Cecilie of Baden). He was mostly known as "Sandro". From a young age, Sandro displayed a wish to join the navy, which his parents disapproved of. After the intervention of his cousin, Alexander III, he was able to become a naval officer.

In his youth, he made a good-will visit to the Empire of Japan on behalf of the Russian Empire and another to the Brazilian Empire in 1887. There, he had his first romance with a 16-year-old Brazilian girl. He married his first cousin's daughter, Grand Duchess Xenia Alexandrovna, the eldest daughter of Alexander III on 6 August [O.S. 25 July] 1894. He became a brother-in-law and a close advisor of Tsar Nicholas II.

Like his father before him, Sandro had one daughter and six sons:

- Princess Irina Alexandrovna (1895–1970)
- Prince Andrei Alexandrovich (1897–1981)
- Prince Feodor Alexandrovich (1898–1968)
- Prince Nikita Alexandrovich (1900–1974)
- Prince Dmitri Alexandrovich (1901–1980)
- Prince Rostislav Alexandrovich (1902–1978)
- Prince Vasili Alexandrovich (1907–1989)

Before the revolution, the Grand Duke liked to spend his vacation in France, particularly Biarritz and the Côte d'Azur, where his older brother, Grand Duke Michael Mikhailovich of Russia had financed in 1908 the construction of the Hôtel Carlton, in Cannes.

== Naval career ==
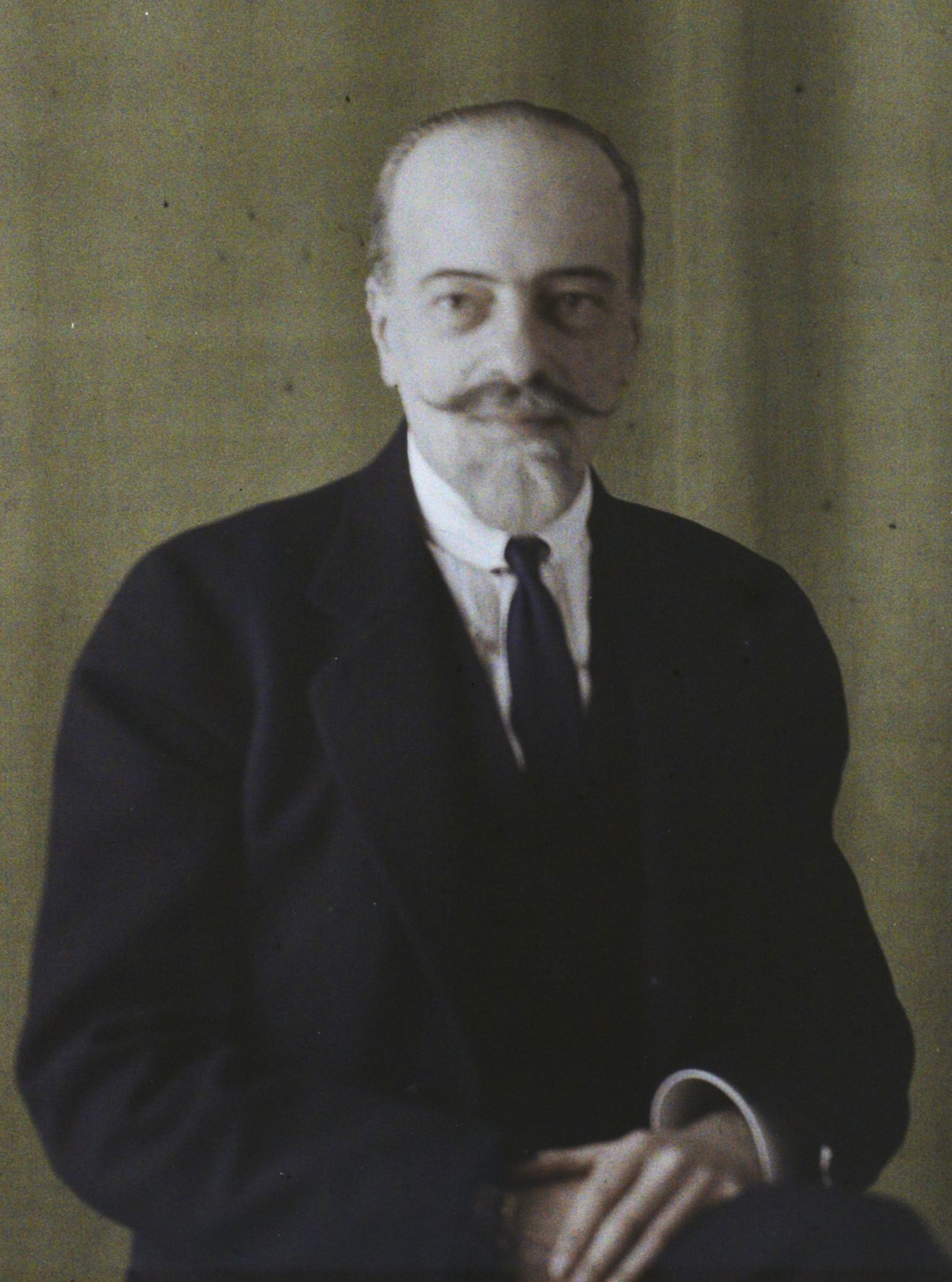
Autochrome portrait by Georges Chevalier, 1923

In 1885 Alexander graduated from the Naval College with the rank of midshipman (Russian: мичман); he served in the Navy and participated in voyages. From 1891 he initiated and founded the first edition of the Russian annual directory of Military Fleets (Russian: Военные флоты), which he edited until 1906. In 1895 he developed a program of strengthening the Russian Navy in the Pacific. Starting in 1896, he taught the Naval Game at the Naval Science Classes in the Naval Academy. Between 1901 and 1902 he acted as the commander of the Black Sea battleship Rostislav, and in 1903 he was appointed a junior flag officer of the Black Sea Fleet. In parallel, between 1901 and 1905 he acted as a chief superintendent and the chairman of several councils related to merchant shipping and ports. At these positions he contributed to the development of commercial shipping, construction and equipment of new ports, the training of merchant mariners, the founding of long-distance shipping lines and the improvement of maritime-trade legislation. During the Russian-Japanese war of 1904–1905 he oversaw the auxiliary cruisers of the Volunteer Fleet. Alexander took part in the development of programs aimed at rebuilding the fleet, brought them to the attention of governments and the public, and avidly supported the construction of new battleships. In 1909 he was promoted to the rank of vice admiral.

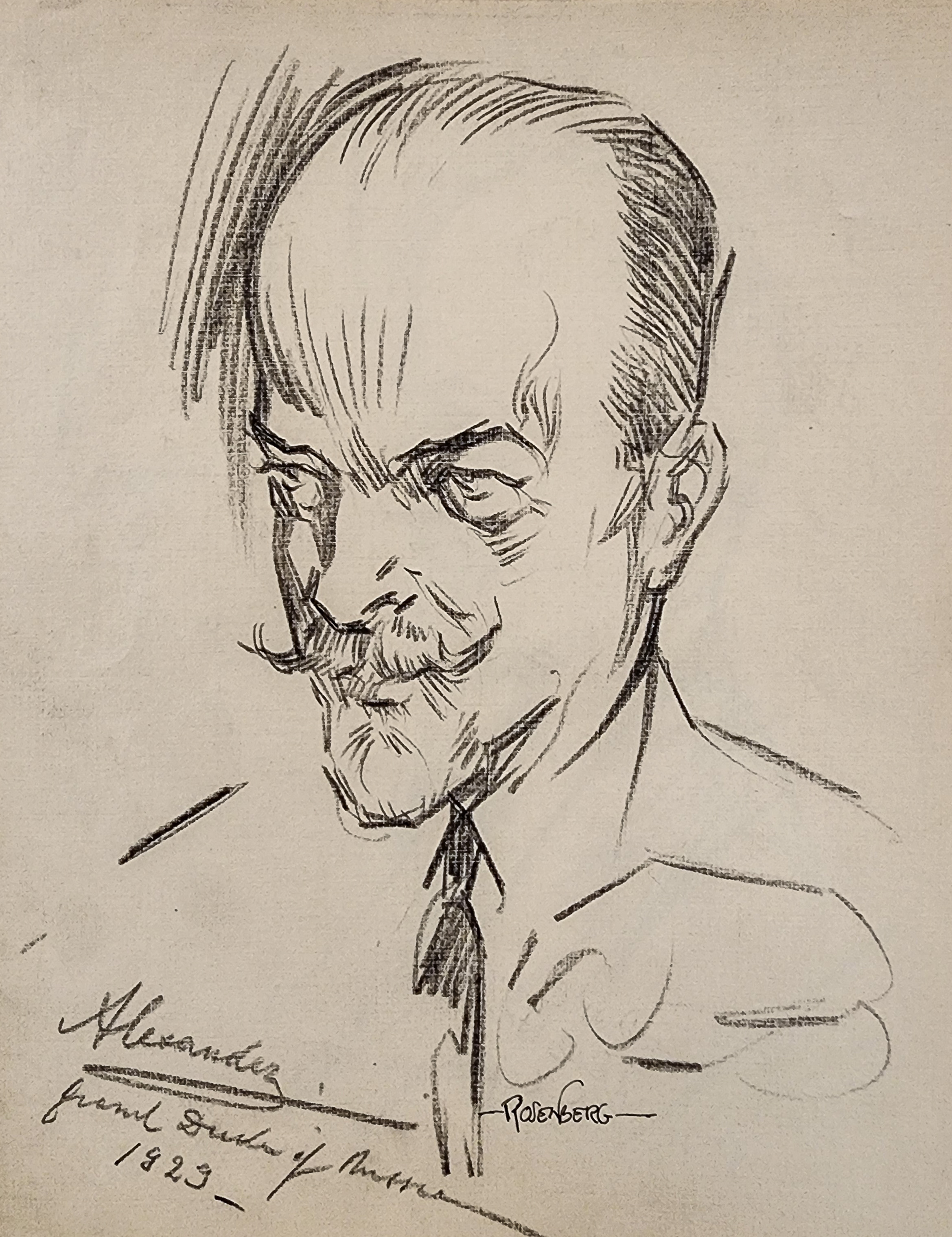
Signed drawing of Grand Duke Alexander by Manuel Rosenberg for the Cincinnati Post 1926

== World War I ==
Alexander played a major role in the creation of Russian military aviation. He was the initiator of the officer's aviation school near Sevastopol in 1910 and later the chief of the Imperial Russian Air Service during the First World War. From December 1916 Alexander was the Field Inspector General of the Imperial Russian Air Service. At the beginning of 1917 he advocated the formation of a government with the participation of public figures, speaking out against the "responsible ministry".

== The Revolution and after ==
His impact on Nicholas has been both criticized and appreciated. His memoirs document that he openly challenged Empress Alexandra's political influence on her husband but wished that Nicholas had used troops to resist the revolution. He also admitted that he had been brought up to share the anti-Semitic views that he claimed were prevalent in Russia prior to the revolution. His appeal to Nicholas, as his children approached adulthood, to relax the requirement for equal marriage for Romanov dynasts was rejected, and all seven of his children married titled but non-royal Russian aristocrats, but only his daughter obtained permission of Nicholas to do so. When Alexander's eldest son, Andrei Alexandrovich, married at Yalta in the Crimea on 12 June 1918, Nicholas, who had abdicated on 15 March 1917, was a prisoner at Yekaterinburg with his family. They would be murdered by the Bolsheviks just over a month later.

Alexander left the Crimea with his eldest son, Prince Andrei Alexandrovich, and his son's new bride, Elisabetta Ruffo di Sant'Antimo, who was pregnant, in December 1918. His wife and mother-in-law, Empress-Dowager Maria Fyodorovna and his sons as well as other Romanovs, were rescued from the Crimea by the British battleship HMS Marlborough in 1919.

Alexander lived in Paris and wrote his memoirs. Once a Grand Duke (Farrar & Rinehart 1933) is a source of dynastical and court life in Imperial Russia's last half-century. He also spent a time as guest of future Emperor Ras Tafari(Haile Selassie). He talks about why he was invited to the Ethiopian Empire in his sequel, Always a Grand Duke. He died in Roquebrune-Cap-Martin, France. He was the last surviving legitimate grandchild of Nicholas I of Russia. He was buried there in Roquebrune. His wife, Xenia, died in Hampton Court Palace in 1960.

While in exile after 1917, he became fascinated with archaeology and conducted a number of successful expeditions.

== Freemasonry ==
Alexander was a "mystical freemason" and spirit, called himself a Rosicrucian and Philalethes. He was a member of the masonic "Grand Ducal Lodge" (St. Petersburg, after 1907 to 1917), the founder of the "Admiralty Lodge" (St. Petersburg, 1910), who worked on the ritual Philalethes. According to the Encyclopaedia by Serkov, Alexander was a master of the lodge "Karma", who worked in the years 1910–1919 Swedish Rite.

== Honours and awards ==
- Russia:
  - Knight of St. Andrew, April 1866
  - Knight of St. Alexander Nevsky, April 1866
  - Knight of the White Eagle, April 1866
  - Knight of St. Anna, 1st Class, April 1866
  - Knight of St. Stanislaus, 1st Class, April 1866
  - Knight of St. Vladimir, 4th Class, January 1893; 3rd Class, December 1906; 2nd Class, May 1913
- Württemberg: Grand Cross of the Württemberg Crown, June 1880
- Mecklenburg-Schwerin: Grand Commander of the Griffon, March 1881; Grand Cross, September 1886
- Brazil:
  - Grand Cross of the Southern Cross, January 1886
  - Grand Cross of the Rose, 1886
- Greece: Grand Cross of the Redeemer, January 1889
- Japan: Grand Cordon of the Rising Sun, January 1889
- Holy See: Grand Cross of the Holy Sepulchre of Jerusalem, March 1889
- Denmark: Knight of the Elephant, 7 September 1895
- (Austrian Empire) (Kingdom of Hungary) Austria-Hungary: Grand Cross of the Royal Hungarian Order of St. Stephen, 22 April 1897
- Siam: Knight of the Order of the Royal House of Chakri, 4 July 1897
- Italy: Knight of the Annunciation, 17 July 1902
- Oldenburg: Grand Cross of the Order of Duke Peter Friedrich Ludwig, with Golden Crown, July 1902
- Norway: Grand Cross of St. Olav, with Collar, 7 September 1908

== Ancestry ==
Ancestors of Grand Duke Alexander Mikhailovich of Russia

8. Paul I of Russia
4. Nicholas I of Russia
9. Duchess Sophie Dorothea of Württemberg
2. Grand Duke Michael Nikolaevich of Russia
10. Frederick William III of Prussia
5. Princess Charlotte of Prussia
11. Duchess Louise of Mecklenburg-Strelitz
1. Grand Duke Alexander Mikhailovich of Russia
12. Charles Frederick, Grand Duke of Baden
6. Leopold, Grand Duke of Baden
13. Baroness Louise Caroline Geyer of Geyersberg
3. Princess Cecilie of Baden
14. Gustav IV Adolf of Sweden
7. Princess Sophie of Sweden
15. Princess Frederica of Baden
