= Princess Andrew (disambiguation) =

Princess Andrew may refer to:

- Princess Alice of Battenberg (1885–1969), wife of Prince Andrew of Greece and Denmark.
- Elisabetta di Sasso Ruffo (1886–1940), first wife of Prince Andrei Alexandrovich of Russia
- Nadine McDougall (1908–2000), second wife of Prince Andrei Alexandrovich of Russia
- Princess Christina Margarethe of Hesse (1933–2011), former wife of Prince Andrew of Yugoslavia
- Inez Storer (born 1933), wife of Prince Andrew Romanoff
- Sarah Ferguson (born 1959), former wife of Prince Andrew, Duke of York, later Andrew Mountbatten-Windsor
