= Princess Xenia Andreevna of Russia =

Russian princess and Tsar descendant

Princess Xenia Andreevna Romanova
- Xenia in the 1940s
- Born: 10 March 1919; Paris, France
- Died: 22 October 2000 (aged 81)
- Spouse: Calhoun Ancrum (m. 1945; div. 1954) Geoffrey Tooth (m. 1958; died 1998)
- House: Holstein-Gottorp-Romanov
- Father: Prince Andrei Alexandrovich of Russia
- Mother: Elisabetha di Sasso Ruffo

Princess Xenia Andreevna Romanova (10 March 1919 – 22 October 2000) was a direct descendant of the Tsars of Russia. She was a great niece of Nicholas II, the last reigning Russian Emperor.

== Biography ==
Princess Xenia was born in Paris, on 10 March 1919, where her parents had fled after the Russian Revolution. She was the eldest child of Prince Andrei Alexandrovich of Russia (24 January 1897 – 8 May 1981) and Donna Elisabetha Ruffo (1886–1940). Xenia Andreevna descended twice over from the Tsars of Russia.

Her paternal grandfather, Grand Duke Alexander Mikhailovich, was the fourth son of Grand Duke Michael, who was the fourth son of Tsar Nicholas I. Her paternal grandmother, Grand Duchess Xenia Alexandrovna of Russia, was the eldest daughter of Tsar Alexander III and sister to Tsar Nicholas II.

Xenia's father Prince Andrew Romanoff, a nephew of the Tsar, in 1918 had married Elisaveta Fabrizievna, daughter of Don Fabrizio Ruffo, Duca di Sasso-Ruffo. During the Russian Revolution, those families had taken refuge in the Crimea, where Andrew and Elisaveta married. They escaped Russia in December 1918. Xenia's mother was already pregnant with her when they left Russian soil. Princess Xenia had two younger brothers: Michael and Andrew. Already battling cancer, her mother died from injuries sustained when a World War II bomb blast hit their house. Her father soon remarried to Nadine Sylvia Ada McDougall and Xenia had one half sister, Princess Olga Andreevna.

Princess Xenia, called "Mysh" in the family, was educated privately. For much of her childhood, she lived in the household of her grandmother Grand Duchess Xenia at Frogmore House, a grace-and-favour house in Windsor Great Park, provided by King George V. She also spent some of her early years in London. After King George V's death in 1936, her family moved with their grandmother to Wilderness House, another house in the royal gift, at Hampton Court. Xenia and her siblings had an English nanny, but the children spoke Russian among the family at home. In 1938 she took ballet lessons at the school of Russian Ballet in London.

During World War II, Princess Xenia Romanov worked as a nurse at Great Ormond Street Hospital and later worked as a volunteer with the Russian Benevolent Society for Refugees.

She married in London on 17 June 1945 to 2nd Lieutenant Calhoun Ancrum from South Carolina (b. Philippines 28 April 1915 – 21 February 1990). The American airman was born into a military family; his father was a colonel in the US Marine Corps. Cal Ancrum was serving abroad with the US Army when he and Xenia Romanoff met. Initially, they lived in England, then in Germany for a time where her husband was assigned. They moved to the United States. They divorced in 1954.

Later Romanoff met Geoffrey Tooth, head of the Mental Health section at the British Ministry of Health and a member of the Expert Advisory Panel at the World Health Organization. They married on 7 April 1958 in Tehran. During the 1970s Xenia and Geoffrey Tooth (b. 1 September 1908) settled at Rouffignac, in the Dordogne, France. Geoffrey Tooth died in 1998. Princess Xenia Romanoff outlived her husband by two years. She died on 22 October 2000 in Saint-Cernin. Princess Xenia had no children from either of her marriages.

== Ancestry ==
Ancestors of Princess Xenia Andreevna of Russia

8. Grand Duke Michael Nikolaevich of Russia
4. Grand Duke Alexander Mikhailovich of Russia
9. Princess Cecilie of Baden
2. Prince Andrey Alexandrovich of Russia
10. Alexander III of Russia
5. Grand Duchess Xenia Alexandrovna of Russia
11. Princess Dagmar of Denmark
1. Princess Xenia Andreyevna of Russia
12. Girolamo Ruffo dei Duchi di Bagnara
6. Frabrizio Ruffo, Duke of Sasso Ruffo
13. Elena Filomarino dei Principi della Rocca d'Aspro
3. Elisabetta Ruffo dei Duchi di Sasso Ruffo
14. Prince Alexander Vasilyevich Meshchersky
7. Princess Natalya Alexandrovna Meshcherskaya
15. Countess Elizaveta Sergeyevna Stroganova
