= Prince Michael Andreevich of Russia =

Member of the House of Romanov (1920–2008)

Prince Michael Andreevich
- Michael in 1942
- Born: 15 July 1920; Versailles, France
- Died: 22 September 2008 (aged 88); Sydney, New South Wales, Australia
- Spouse: Jill Murphy (m. 1953; div. 1953) Shirley Cramond (m. 1954; died 1983) Giulia Crespi (m. 1993)
Names
- Michael Andreevich Romanoff
- House: Holstein-Gottorp-Romanov
- Father: Prince Andrei Alexandrovich of Russia
- Mother: Elisabetta di Sasso Ruffo

Prince Michael Andreevich of Russia (15 July 1920 – 22 September 2008) was a descendant of the House of Romanov. He was a great-nephew of Nicholas II, the last emperor of Russia.

== Early life ==
Prince Michael Andreevich was born in Versailles, the second child and eldest son of Prince Andrei Alexandrovich of Russia and Donna Elisabetta di Sasso-Ruffo (1886–1940). He was a grandson of Grand Duke Alexander Mikhailovich of Russia and Grand Duchess Xenia Alexandrovna of Russia and a great nephew of Nicholas II, the last Emperor of Russia. From his father's first marriage he had two siblings, an older sister Xenia and a younger brother Andrew. From his father's second marriage he had one half sister, Olga.

Neither Grand Duke Cyril Vladimirovich nor his son Grand Duke Vladimir Cyrillovich (who were heads of the House of Romanov from 1924 to 1992) recognised Michael as a Prince of Russia. Cyril and Vladimir held that the marriage of Prince Michael Andreevitch's parents was not dynastic and that Michael had no succession rights to the Russian throne. They accorded him the title HSH Prince Romanovsky-di Sasso Ruffo.

Prince Michael Andreevich was educated at Beaumont College in Old Windsor, and lived with his parents and his grandmother Grand Duchess Xenia in exile at Craigowan Lodge on the Balmoral Estate in Scotland as well as at Frogmore Cottage on the grounds of Windsor Castle. The family later stayed at Wilderness House until Michael was commissioned to serve in the Royal Navy during World War II. During the war Michael served in Australia with the Fleet Air Arm. He moved there permanently following the conclusion of the war and became an aviation engineer.

== Marriages and later life ==
Prince Michael Andreevich was married three times in his life. On 24 February 1953 in Sydney, he married Jill Esther Blanche Murphy (1921-2006); the marriage was short-lived and was dissolved by divorce in September 1953. On 23 July 1954 in Sydney he married Shirley Cramond (1916–1983). On 14 July 1993 in Sydney he married Giulia Crespi (born 1930). Michael had no children from any of his marriages.

In 1980, Prince Michael Andreevich became Imperial protector of the Sovereign Order of the Orthodox Knights Hospitaller of St. John of Jerusalem which was formerly under the protection of his father Prince Andrei and uncle Prince Vasili. In 2006 he was elected Grand Prior. This group is not recognised by the Sovereign Military Order of Malta, or the Associated Orders of St. John. He was also vice-president of the Romanov Family Association.

Prince Michael Andreevich died at 2 AM on 22 September 2008 in Sydney, the same day as his cousin, Prince Michael Feodorovich of Russia, the son of Prince Feodor Alexandrovich of Russia.

== Ancestry ==
Ancestors of Prince Michael Andreevich of Russia

8. Grand Duke Michael Nikolaevich of Russia
4. Grand Duke Alexander Mikhailovich of Russia
9. Princess Cecilie of Baden
2. Prince Andrey Alexandrovich of Russia
10. Alexander III of Russia
5. Grand Duchess Xenia Alexandrovna of Russia
11. Princess Dagmar of Denmark
1. Prince Michael Andreyevich of Russia
12. Girolamo Ruffo dei Duchi di Bagnara
6. Frabrizio Ruffo, Duke of Sasso Ruffo
13. Elena Filomarino dei Principi della Rocca d'Aspro
3. Elisabetta Ruffo dei Duchi di Sasso Ruffo
14. Prince Alexander Vasilyevich Meshchersky
7. Princess Natalya Alexandrovna Meshcherskaya
15. Countess Elizaveta Sergeyevna Stroganova
