= Princess Xenia =

Princess Xenia may refer to:

- Princess Xenia of Montenegro (1881–1960)
- Princess Xenia Andreevna of Russia (1919–2000)
- Princess Xenia Georgievna of Russia (1903–1965)

== See also ==
- Grand Duchess Xenia Alexandrovna of Russia (1875–1960)
- Xenia Borisovna of Russia (1582–1622)
- Xenia of Tarusa (c. 1246–1312)
- Xenia (name)
