= Saint-Cernin =

Saint-Cernin may refer to places in France:

- Saint-Cernin, Cantal, a commune in the Cantal department
- Saint-Cernin, Lot, a commune in the Lot department
- Saint-Cernin-de-l'Herm, a commune in the Dordogne department
- Saint-Cernin-de-Labarde, a commune in the Dordogne department
- Saint-Cernin-de-Larche, a commune in the Corrèze department

== See also ==
- Rouffignac-Saint-Cernin-de-Reilhac, a commune in the Dordogne department
- Černín, a municipality and village in the Czech Republic
