= HMS Marlborough (1912) =

Royal Navy Iron Duke-class battleship

- HMS Marlborough

History

United Kingdom
- Name: HMS Marlborough
- Namesake: John Churchill, 1st Duke of Marlborough
- Ordered: 1911
- Builder: Devonport Dockyard
- Laid down: 25 January 1912
- Launched: 24 October 1912
- Commissioned: June 1914
- Stricken: 1932
- Fate: Sold for scrap, 27 June 1932

General characteristics
- Type: Iron Duke-class battleship
- Displacement: Normal: 25,000 long tons (25,401 t); Full load: 29,560 long tons (30,030 t)
- Length: 622 ft 9 in (190 m) o/a
- Beam: 90 ft (27.4 m)
- Draught: 29 ft 6 in (8.99 m)
- Installed power: 18 × Babcock & Wilcox boilers; 29,000 shp (22,000 kW)
- Propulsion: 4 × Parsons turbines; 4 × screw propellers
- Speed: 21.25 kn (39.4 km/h; 24.5 mph)
- Range: 7,800 nmi (8,976 mi; 14,446 km) at 10 kn (11.5 mph; 18.5 km/h)
- Complement: 995–1,022
- Armament: 10 × BL 13.5 in (343 mm)/45 cal Mk V guns; 12 × 6 in (152 mm)/45 cal Mk VII guns; 2 × QF 3 in (76 mm) 20 cwt AA guns; 4 × 21 inch (533 mm) torpedo tubes
- Armour: Belt: 12 in (305 mm); Deck: 2.5 in (64 mm); Barbettes: 10 in (254 mm); Turrets: 11 in (279 mm)

HMS Marlborough was an Iron Duke-class battleship of the Royal Navy, named in honour of John Churchill, 1st Duke of Marlborough. She was built at Devonport Royal Dockyard between January 1912 and June 1914, entering service just before the outbreak of the First World War. She was armed with a main battery of ten 13.5-inch (343 mm) guns and was capable of a top speed of 21.25 knots (39.36 km/h; 24.45 mph).

Marlborough served with the Grand Fleet for the duration of the war, primarily patrolling the northern end of the North Sea to enforce the blockade of Germany. She saw action at the Battle of Jutland (31 May – 1 June 1916), where she administered the coup de grâce to the badly damaged German cruiser SMS Wiesbaden. During the engagement, Wiesbaden hit Marlborough with a torpedo that eventually forced her to withdraw. The damage to Marlborough was repaired by early August, though the last two years of the war were uneventful, as the British and German fleets adopted more cautious strategies due to the threat of underwater weapons.

After the war, Marlborough was assigned to the Mediterranean Fleet, where she took part in the Allied intervention in the Russian Civil War in the Black Sea in 1919–1920, and she rescued members of the Imperial Family from Yalta in 1919. She was also involved in the Greco-Turkish War. In 1930, the London Naval Treaty mandated that the four Iron Duke-class battleships be discarded; Marlborough was used for a variety of weapons tests in 1931–1932, the results of which were incorporated into the reconstruction programme for the Queen Elizabeth-class battleships.

== Design ==
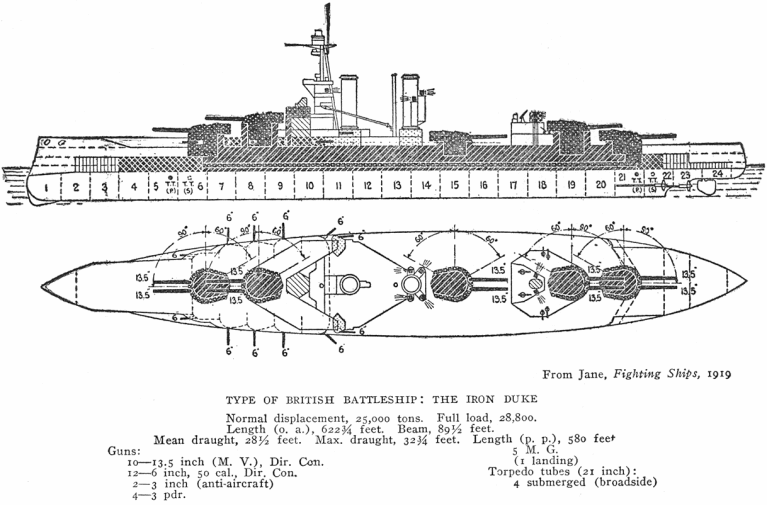
Plan and profile of the Iron Duke class

The four Iron Duke-class battleships were ordered in the 1911 building programme, and were an incremental improvement over the preceding King George V class. The primary change between the two designs was the substitution of a heavier secondary battery in the newer vessels. Marlborough was 622 feet 9 inches (190 m) long overall and had a beam of 90 ft (27 m) and an average draught of 29 ft 6 in (9 m). She displaced 25,000 long tons (25,401 t) as designed and up to 29,560 long tons (30,034 t) at full load. Her propulsion system consisted of four Parsons steam turbines, with steam provided by eighteen Babcock & Wilcox boilers. The engines were rated at 29,000 shaft horsepower (21,625 kW) and produced a top speed of 21.25 kn (39 km/h; 24 mph). Marlborough's cruising radius was 7,800 nautical miles (14,446 km; 8,976 mi) at a more economical 10 kn (19 km/h; 12 mph). She had a crew of 995 officers and ratings; during wartime this increased to up to 1,022.

The ship was armed with a main battery of ten BL 13.5-inch (343 mm) Mk V naval guns mounted in five twin gun turrets. They were arranged in two superfiring pairs, one forward and one aft; the fifth turret was located amidships, between the funnels and the rear superstructure. Close-range defence against torpedo boats was provided by a secondary armament of twelve BL 6-inch (152 mm) Mk VII guns. Marlborough was also fitted with a pair of QF 3-inch 20 cwt anti-aircraft guns and four 47 mm (1.9 in) 3-pounder guns. (Note: "Cwt" is the abbreviation for hundredweight, 20 cwt referring to the weight of the gun.) As was typical for capital ships of the period, she was equipped with four 21 in (533 mm) torpedo tubes submerged on the broadside.

Marlborough was protected by a main armoured belt that was 12 in (305 mm) thick over the ship's ammunition magazines and engine and boiler rooms, and reduced to 4 in (102 mm) toward the bow and stern. Her deck was 2.5 in (64 mm) thick in the central portion of the ship, and reduced to 1 in (25 mm) elsewhere. The main battery turret faces were 11 in (279 mm) thick, and the turrets were supported by 10 in (254 mm) thick barbettes.

== Service history ==
Marlborough was laid down at Devonport Royal Dockyard on 25 January 1912. She was launched nearly ten months later, on 24 October, and was commissioned on 2 June 1914. The ship was completed on 16 June 1914, a month before the First World War broke out on the Continent. Marlborough initially joined the Home Fleets, where she served as the flagship for Sir Lewis Bayly. Following the British entry into the war in August, the Home Fleets was reorganised as the Grand Fleet, commanded by Admiral John Jellicoe. Marlborough was assigned as the flagship of the 1st Battle Squadron, where she served for the duration of the conflict.

=== First World War ===
Map of the North Sea

On the evening of 22 November 1914, the Grand Fleet conducted a fruitless sweep in the southern half of the North Sea to support Vice Admiral David Beatty's 1st Battlecruiser Squadron. The fleet was back in port at Scapa Flow by 27 November. Marlborough and most of the fleet initially remained in port during the German raid on Scarborough, Hartlepool and Whitby on 16 December 1914, though the 3rd Battle Squadron was sent to reinforce the British forces in the area. After receiving further information about the possibility of the rest of the German fleet being at sea, Jellicoe gave the order for the fleet to sortie to try to intercept the Germans, though by that time they had already retreated. Vice Admiral Cecil Burney replaced Bayley aboard Marlborough in December; at that time, Marlborough became the second-in-command flagship for the Grand Fleet. On 25 December, the fleet sortied for a sweep in the North Sea, which concluded on 27 December without event. Marlborough and the rest of the fleet conducted gunnery drills during 10–13 January 1915 west of Orkney and Shetland. On the evening of 23 January, the bulk of the Grand Fleet sailed in support of Beatty's Battlecruiser Fleet but the rest of the fleet did not become engaged in the ensuing Battle of Dogger Bank the following day.

On 7–10 March 1915, the Grand Fleet conducted a sweep in the northern North Sea, during which it undertook training manoeuvres. Another such cruise took place during 16–19 March. On 11 April, the Grand Fleet conducted a patrol in the central North Sea and returned to port on 14 April; another patrol in the area took place during 17–19 April, followed by gunnery drills off Shetland on 20–21 April. The Grand Fleet conducted a sweep into the central North Sea during 17–19 May without encountering German vessels. Another patrol followed during 29–31 May; it too was uneventful. The fleet conducted gunnery training in mid-June. During 2–5 September, the fleet went on another cruise in the northern end of the North Sea and conducted gunnery drills. Throughout the rest of the month, the Grand Fleet conducted numerous training exercises.

On 13 October, the majority of the fleet conducted a sweep into the North Sea, returning to port on 15 October. During 2–5 November, Marlborough participated in a fleet training operation west of Orkney. Another such cruise took place during 1–4 December. The typical routine of gunnery drills and squadron exercises occurred in January 1916. The fleet departed for a cruise in the North Sea on 26 February; Jellicoe had intended to use the Harwich Force to sweep the Heligoland Bight, but bad weather prevented operations in the southern North Sea. As a result, the operation was confined to the northern end of the sea. On the night of 25 March, Iron Duke and the rest of the fleet sailed from Scapa Flow, to support the Battlecruiser Fleet and other light forces that raided the German zeppelin base at Tondern.

On 21 April, the Grand Fleet conducted a demonstration off Horns Reef to distract the Germans, while the Russian Navy relaid its defensive minefields in the Baltic Sea. The fleet returned to Scapa Flow on 24 April and refuelled, before proceeding south in response to intelligence reports that the Germans were about to launch a raid on Lowestoft. The Grand Fleet did not arrive in the area until after the Germans had withdrawn. During 2–4 May, the fleet conducted another demonstration off Horns Reef to keep German attention focused on the North Sea.

==== Battle of Jutland ====
Maps showing the manoeuvres of the British (blue) and German (red) fleets on 31 May – 1 June 1916

In an attempt to lure out and destroy a portion of the Grand Fleet, the German High Seas Fleet with 16 dreadnoughts, six pre-dreadnoughts, six light cruisers and 31 torpedo boats commanded by Vice Admiral Reinhard Scheer, departed Jade Bight early on the morning of 31 May. The fleet sailed in concert with Rear Admiral Franz von Hipper's five battlecruisers and supporting cruisers and torpedo boats. The Royal Navy's Room 40 had intercepted and decrypted German radio traffic containing plans of the operation. The Admiralty ordered the Grand Fleet of 28 dreadnoughts and 9 battlecruisers, to sortie the night before to cut off and destroy the High Seas Fleet. On the day of the battle, Marlborough was stationed toward the rear of the British line in the 6th Division of the 1st Battle Squadron.

The initial action was fought primarily by the British and German battlecruiser formations in the afternoon, but by 18:00, (Note: The times used in this section are in UT, which is one hour behind CET, which is often used in German works.) the Grand Fleet approached the scene. Fifteen minutes later, Jellicoe gave the order to turn and deploy the fleet for action. The transition from their cruising formation caused congestion with the rear divisions, forcing Marlborough and many of the other ships to reduce speed to 8 knots (15 km/h; 9.2 mph) to avoid colliding with each other. The British ships initially had poor visibility and Marlborough could only faintly make out a group of German Kaiser-class battleships at 18:17. In the span of four minutes, she fired seven salvos, first at 10,000 yards (9,100 m) and then at 13,000 yards (12,000 m). Marlborough's gunners claimed to have made hits with the fifth and seventh salvos, but these claims are unlikely. Her guns were then masked by a burning cruiser, probably the armoured cruiser HMS Warrior.

Marlborough joined the group of battleships battering the German light cruiser SMS Wiesbaden at 18:25. She fired five salvos, before a premature detonation in the right barrel of "A" turret disabled the gun. (Note: The Royal Navy used letters to refer to the locations of the gun turrets aboard warships; "A" and "B" turrets were located forward, the centre turret was "Q", and the rear pair were "X" and "Y".) She also engaged the ship with her secondary battery. At 18:39, Marlborough again engaged what appeared to be a Kaiser-class ship, firing a salvo before the German vessel disappeared into the haze. During the engagement with Wiesbaden, the German cruiser launched one or two torpedoes at around 18:45, one of which struck Marlborough around the starboard diesel generator room. The detonation tore a 28-foot (8.5 m) hole in the hull and causing significant flooding, that forced the forward boilers on that side of the ship to be extinguished and reduced the ship's speed to 16 knots (30 km/h; 18 mph). Burney initially reported to Jellicoe that his ship had struck a mine or had been hit by a torpedo at 18:57. Several more torpedoes, this time from the torpedo boat SMS V48, forced Marlborough and the rest of the ships in her division to take evasive action.

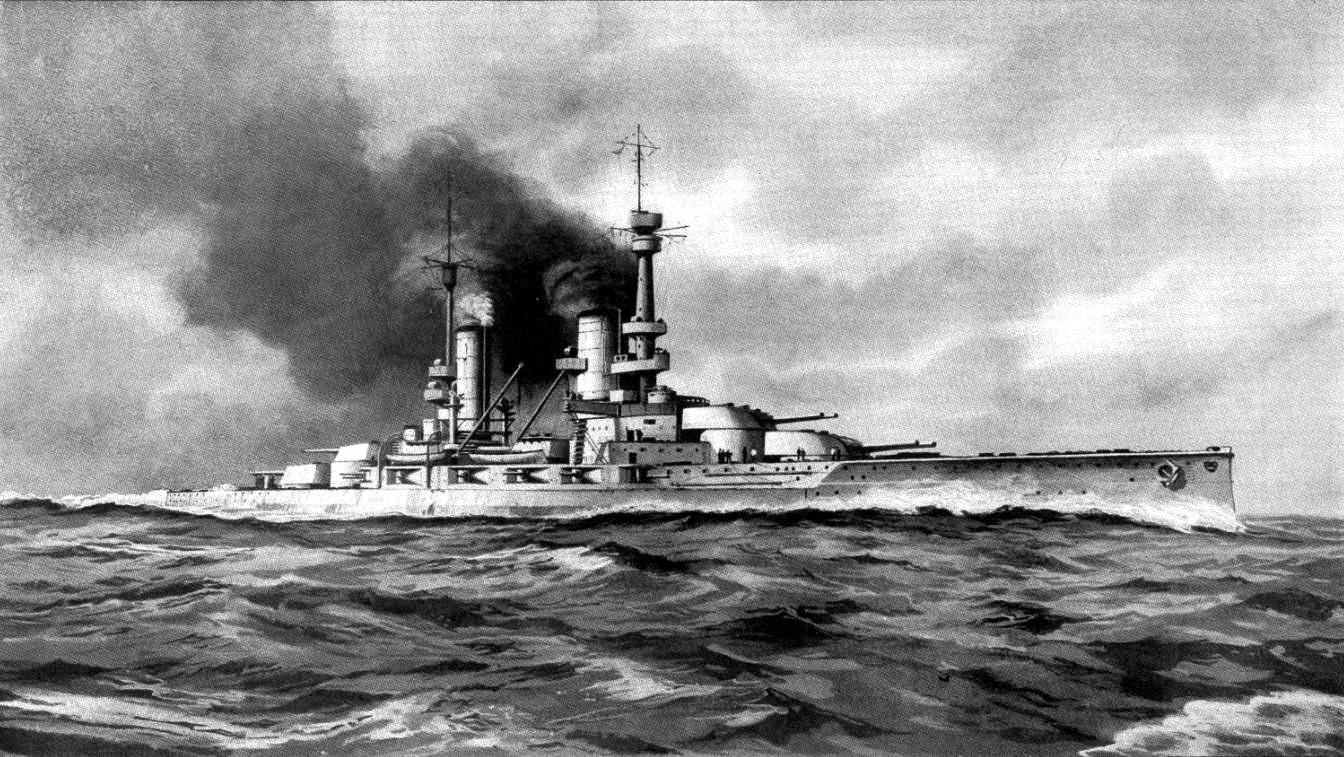
Recognition drawing of a König-class battleship; Marlborough scored three hits on SMS Grosser Kurfürst during the battle

At 19:03, Marlborough engaged Wiesbaden again, firing four salvos at ranges of 9,500 to 9,800 yards (8,700 to 9,000 m). She hit the German cruiser with probably three shells from the last two salvos and these finally neutralised the ship, although it took several more hours before Wiesbaden sank. Marlborough then shifted fire to the König-class battleships leading the German line at 19:12. She fired thirteen salvos in the span of six minutes at SMS Grosser Kurfürst at ranges of 10,200 to 10,750 yards (9,330 to 9,830 m), scoring three hits, though she incorrectly claimed a fourth hit. During this phase of the battle, Marlborough fired two torpedoes, both of which missed their targets: the first at Wiesbaden at 19:10 and the second at SMS Kaiser at 19:25.

By about 19:30, Marlborough's pumps had contained the flooding in the boiler rooms but she took on a list of around 7–8 degrees. Instead of using counter-flooding to minimise the list, her crew attempted to correct the list by using coal and oil from the starboard bunkers first. The list caused the generators supplying power to the main battery turrets to flood, hampering the gun crews, particularly as shells were transferred from the magazines to the turrets. The blast from the torpedo was so powerful that forty watertight compartments were damaged, though the torpedo bulkhead localised most of the damage and the more badly damaged compartments were sufficiently shored up. Three more torpedoes approached Marlborough at 19:33. She evaded the first two and the third harmlessly passed under the ship.

After the opposing fleets disengaged late in the day, the Grand Fleet steamed south in an attempt to cut off the retreating Germans and destroy them the following morning. The 6th Division was slowed down by Marlborough, which could make no more than 15.75 kn (29.17 km/h; 18.12 mph) by this point. By around 02:00 on 1 June, the 6th Division was about 12 nmi (22 km; 14 mi) behind the rest of the fleet. At that time, the bulkheads in the starboard forward boiler room started to give way under the strain, forcing Marlborough to reduce speed to 12 knots (22 km/h; 14 mph). The damage control teams believed that if the main battery were to fire, the shoring supporting the damaged bulkheads would give way, greatly increasing the risk to the ship. Jellicoe detached the ship to proceed independently to Rosyth or the Tyne; Burney had ordered the scout cruiser Fearless to come alongside to transfer him to the battleship Revenge. Marlborough thereafter proceeded northward at a speed of 11 knots (20 km/h; 13 mph).

Fearless rejoined Marlborough around 04:00 and both ships briefly fired at the German zeppelin L11. Commodore Reginald Tyrwhitt's Harwich Force had been ordered to reinforce the Grand Fleet, particularly to relieve ships low on fuel; they departed at 03:50 but this was too late for them to reach the fleet by morning, so Jellicoe ordered Tyrwhitt to detach destroyers to escort Marlborough back to port. On the way, Marlborough and Fearless encountered the British submarines G3 and G5; the two submarines prepared to attack the ships but fortunately recognised them before they launched torpedoes. By 15:00, eight destroyers from the Harwich Force had joined Marlborough and another pump had been lowered into the flooded boiler room. At around 23:30, the pump was being moved to clean it when the roll of the ship threw the pump into the damaged bulkhead, knocking the shores loose. Water flooded into the ship and Marlborough's captain ordered Fearless and the destroyers to prepare to come alongside, to rescue the crew if the flooding worsened at 00:47 on 2 June. A diver was sent into the boiler room at that time, and he was able to keep the pump clean, which slowly reduced the water level in the ship.

Jellicoe ordered Marlborough to proceed to the Humber for temporary repairs. While there, her forward main battery and 6-inch magazines were emptied to lighten the ship, more pumps were brought aboard and the shoring supporting the damaged bulkhead was reinforced. On the morning of 6 June, the ship left the Humber for the Tyne, where she would receive permanent repairs, escorted by four destroyers from the Harwich Force. In the course of the battle, Marlborough had fired 162 shells from her main battery, 60 rounds from her secondary guns and five torpedoes. The torpedo hit had killed two men and wounded another two. She was repaired by the Armstrong Whitworth shipyard at Jarrow, with the work lasting until 2 August, after which she departed for Cromarty, arriving on 5 August. During the repair work, an extra 100 t (98 long tons; 110 short tons) of armour plating was added to the ship, primarily over the magazines. These alterations were the result of the British experience at Jutland, where three battlecruisers had been destroyed by magazine explosions.

==== Later operations ====
On 18 August, the Germans again sortied, this time to bombard Sunderland; Scheer hoped to draw out Beatty's battlecruisers and destroy them. British signals intelligence decrypted German wireless transmissions, allowing Jellicoe enough time to deploy the Grand Fleet in an attempt to engage in a decisive battle. Both sides withdrew the following day, after their opponents' submarines inflicted losses in the action of 19 August: the British cruisers Nottingham and Falmouth were both torpedoed and sunk by German U-boats and the German battleship SMS Westfalen was damaged by the British submarine E23. After returning to port, Jellicoe issued an order that prohibited risking the fleet in the southern half of the North Sea due to the overwhelming risk from mines and U-boats.

In February 1917, Revenge replaced Marlborough as the 1st Battle Squadron flagship; she thereafter served as the second command flagship. She was briefly replaced in this role by Emperor of India in May and she temporarily became a private ship. Toward the end of the year, the Germans began using destroyers and light cruisers to raid the British convoys to Norway; this forced the British to deploy capital ships to protect the convoys. On 23 April 1918, the German fleet sortied in an attempt to catch one of the isolated British squadrons, though the convoy had already passed safely. The Grand Fleet sortied too late the following day to catch the retreating Germans, though the battlecruiser SMS Moltke was torpedoed and badly damaged by the submarine HMS E42. In 1918, Marlborough and her sisters received flying-off platforms on their "B" and "Q" turrets to handle reconnaissance aircraft.

Following the capitulation of Germany in November 1918, the Allies interned most of the High Seas Fleet at Scapa Flow. The fleet rendezvoused with the British light cruiser Cardiff, which led the ships to the Allied fleet that was to escort the Germans to Scapa Flow. The massive fleet consisted of some 370 British, American, and French warships. The fleet remained in captivity during the negotiations that ultimately produced the Treaty of Versailles. Reuter believed that the British intended to seize the German ships on 21 June 1919, which was the deadline for Germany to have signed the peace treaty. That morning, the Grand Fleet left Scapa Flow to conduct training manoeuvres and while they were away Reuter issued the order to scuttle the High Seas Fleet.

=== Postwar career ===
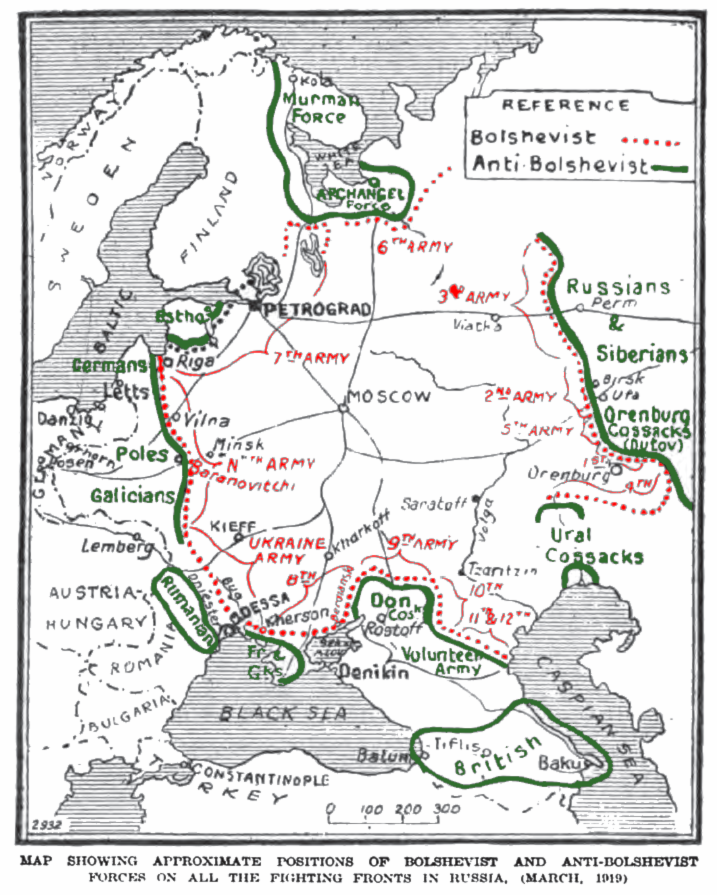
Map of the approximate positions of the Bolshevik and White forces in Russia in 1919

On 12 March 1919, Marlborough was recommissioned at Devonport and assigned to the Mediterranean Fleet, as part of the 4th Battle Squadron, along with her three sisters and two King George V-class battleships, Centurion and Ajax. During this period, she served in the Black Sea during the Allied intervention in the Russian Civil War to support the Whites against the Red Bolsheviks. On 5 April 1919, Marlborough arrived in Sevastopol before proceeding to Yalta the following day. The ship took Dowager Empress Maria Feodorovna and other members of the deposed Russian Imperial Family including Grand Duchess Xenia, Grand Duke Alexander Mikhailovich, Grand Duke Nicholas Nikolaevich, Prince Andrei Alexandrovich, Princess Andrei Romanovskya, Princess Irina Alexandrovna, Prince Felix Yusupov, and Princess Irina Yusupova aboard in Yalta on the evening of the 7th. The Empress refused to leave unless the British also evacuated wounded and sick soldiers, along with any civilians that also wanted to escape the advancing Bolsheviks. The Russian entourage aboard Marlborough numbered some 80 people, including 44 members of the Royal Family and nobility, with a number of governesses, nurses, maids and manservants, plus several hundred cases of luggage.

Officer's cabins were vacated and more bunks installed in some. The Empress took over the Captain's cabin. On the morning of 12 April the ship anchored off Halki Island, about 12 miles (19 km) from Constantinople, due to doubt over the family's destination. On 16 April members of the family and their servants left the ship for HMS Lord Nelson destined for Genoa. They were replaced by other members of the nobility who were taken to Malta. The ship departed on 18 April, bound for Malta to deposit the Russians, before returning to Constantinople.

In May 1919, Marlborough conducted tests with new high-explosive 6-inch shells off the Kerch Peninsula, though these proved to be unreliable. During this period, she operated a kite balloon to aid in spotting the fall of shot. Later that month, a shell broke up in the left barrel of "A" turret and caused minor damage. While stationed off the Kerch Peninsula, the ship provided artillery support to White troops, including bombardments of Bolshevik positions in the villages of Koi-Asan and Dal Kamici. By 1920, British attention had turned to the Greco-Turkish War. On 20 June 1920, Marlborough arrived in Constantinople, where the Mediterranean Fleet was being concentrated to support the occupation of the city. On 6 July, British forces landed at Gemlik, while Marlborough provided artillery support.

In October 1920, the battleship King George V arrived to replace Marlborough in the Mediterranean Fleet. Marlborough then returned to Devonport, where she was paid off for a major refit that took place between February 1921 and January 1922. During the refit, range dials were installed, along with another range-finder on the rear superstructure. The aircraft platform was removed from "B" turret. Long-base range-finders were installed on "X" turret. (Note: Generally, the longer the base tube of a coincidence rangefinder, the greater the level of accuracy that can be achieved at long distances. British battleships were initially fitted with 9-foot rangefinders, though starting with the Queen Elizabeth class, 15-foot rangefinders were adopted, with older vessels being retrofitted starting in 1916. See: Friedman, pp. 24–25) After completing the refit in January 1922, Marlborough was recommissioned and assigned to the Mediterranean, where she replaced Emperor of India. She served as the second command flagship until October. Following the Treaty of Lausanne in 1923, the Allied countries withdrew their occupation forces from Turkey; Marlborough was involved in escorting the troop convoys out of Constantinople.

Marlborough briefly served as the flagship for the deputy commander of the 4th Battle Squadron after King George V was damaged from striking a rock off Mytilene. In November 1924, the 4th Battle Squadron was renamed the 3rd Battle Squadron. In March 1926, the 3rd Battle Squadron, including Marlborough, was transferred to the Atlantic Fleet. There, the battleships served as training ships. In 1929, the ship's 3-inch anti-aircraft guns were replaced with more powerful 4-inch guns. In January 1931, Marlborough served as the squadron flagship, relieving Emperor of India. She remained in the position for only five months, being decommissioned on 5 June. According to the terms of the London Naval Treaty of 1930, the four ships of the Iron Duke class were to be scrapped or demilitarised; Marlborough was scheduled to be removed from service in 1931 and broken up for scrap.

The ship was used as a target to test the effect of various weapons on capital ships, along with Emperor of India. The tests included firing destroyer armament at the upper works at close range to test their effectiveness in a simulated night engagement, direct hits from 13.5-inch shells, bomb tests, and experiments with flash tightness in the magazines. The first two tests were conducted in July 1931, and were simulations of magazine explosions. The venting system worked as designed, and while the explosions caused serious internal damage, Marlborough was not destroyed, as the three battlecruisers had been at Jutland. In 1932, further tests were conducted with dummy 250-pound (113 kg) and 500-pound (227 kg) bombs to test deck strength; 450-pound (204 kg) armour-piercing (AP) bombs and 1,080-pound (490 kg) high explosive (HE) bombs were then detonated inside the ship to test their effectiveness. The Royal Navy determined that the HE bombs were useless, but that thick deck armour would be required to defeat AP bombs. This led to the decision to reinforce the deck armour of existing battleships throughout the 1930s.

Marlborough was placed on the disposal list in May 1932 and was quickly sold to the Alloa Shipbreaking Co. On 25 June, she arrived in Rosyth, where she was broken up for scrap.
