= Elisabetta di Sasso Ruffo =

Russian aristocrat (1886–1940)

- Princess Andrew of Russia
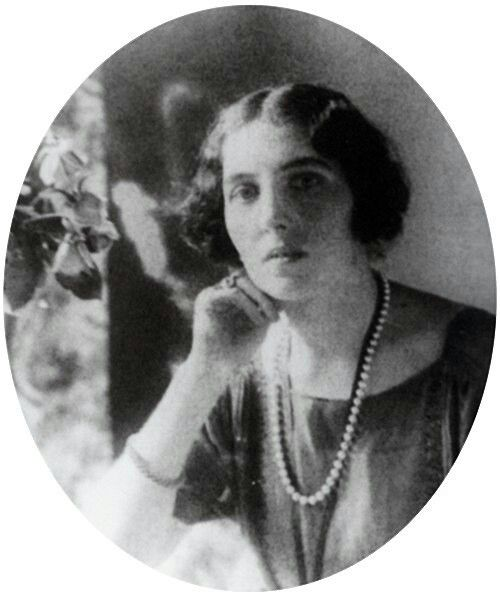
- Photo of Elisabetta Fabrizievna di Sasso Rufffo
- Born: Elisabetta Fabrizievna dei duchi di Sasso-Ruffo dei principi di Sant' Antimo; 26 December 1886; Kharkov, Russian Empire
- Died: 29 October 1940 (aged 53); Richmond upon Thames, London, England
- Burial: Church Road Cemetery; Royal Borough of Windsor and Maidenhead
- Spouses: Alexander Alexandrovitch Friederici (m. 1907; div. 1916) Prince Andrei Alexandrovich of Russia (m. 1918)
- Issue: Elisabeth Alexandrovna Friederici; Princess Xenia Andreevna; Prince Michael Andreevich; Prince Andrew Andreievich
- House: Ruffo (by birth); Holstein-Gottorp-Romanov (by marriage)
- Father: Fabrizio Ruffo, Duke of Sasso-Ruffo
- Mother: Princess Natalia Alexandrovna Mescherskaya

Donna Elisabetta Fabrizievna dei duchi di Sasso-Ruffo dei principi di Sant' Antimo (26 December 1886 – 29 October 1940), known after her marriage as Princess Andrew of Russia or Princess Andrei Romanovskya, was a Russian aristocrat. She was the daughter of the exiled Italian nobleman Frabrizio Ruffo, Duke of Sasso-Ruffo and the Russian noblewoman Princess Natalia Alexandrovna Mescherskaya. She married, firstly, to Imperial Russian military officer Major General Alexander Alexandrovitch Friederici and, secondly, to Prince Andrei Alexandrovich of Russia. When she married Prince Andrei, it was the last royal wedding to take place in Russia until 2021. During her second marriage, she fled Russia aboard HMS Marlborough following the Russian Revolution and lived abroad as a White émigré in France and the United Kingdom. Elisabetta was killed in 1940 during a German air raid on Hampton Court Palace.

== Early life and family ==
Elisabetta was born in 1886 in Kharkov to Don Fabrizio Ruffo, Duke of Sasso-Ruffo (1846–1911) and his wife, Princess Natalia Alexandrovna Mescherskaya (1849–1910). Her father, member of House of Ruffo, one of the oldest Neopolitan noble families, went into exile following the Unification of Italy. Her mother, a Russian noblewoman, member of the House of Meshchersky, has descended from the Stroganov family and was very distantly related to the Russian imperial family. Technically a member of the Italian nobility, she was raised in Russia among the Russian nobility.

== Marriages ==
In 1907, Elisabetta married Major General Alexander Alexandrovitch Friederici at Tsarskoye Selo. With her first husband, she had a daughter named Elisabeth Alexandrovna Friederici. Elisabetta and Friederici divorced in 1916.

Later in 1916, Elisabetta met Prince Andrei Alexandrovich of Russia, a member of the Russian imperial family, in Saint Petersburg. Prince Andrei was the son of Grand Duke Alexander Mikhailovich and Grand Duchess Xenia Alexandrovna and a grandson of Emperor Alexander III. Shortly after they met, the Russian monarchy was overthrown in the February Revolution. Prince Andrei moved with his family to Ai-Todor, his father's property in Crimea. During this time, Elisabetta and Prince Andrei began a relationship. She became pregnant, which led to the couple marrying on 12 June 1918 in the Romanov family chapel at Ai-Todor in the presence of Prince Andrei's family, including Dowager Empress Maria Feodorovna. Their wedding was the last royal wedding to take place in Russia until the wedding of Grand Duke George Mikhailovich of Russia and Rebecca Bettarini in 2021.

== Russian revolution and exile ==
During the time of their wedding, Elisabetta's husband could not contact his uncle, Emperor Nicholas II, who was under house arrest at the Governor's Mansion in Tobolsk. A month after she and Prince Andrei married, the emperor and empress, and their children, were murdered by the Bolsheviks.

For a time, following the October Revolution, the family was imprisoned at Dulber, a palace in Crimea that belonged to Grand Duke Peter Nikolaevich of Russia. They were liberated by German troops and, in December 1918, Elisabetta and her husband fled Russia aboard the British Royal Navy ship HMS Marlborough. They headed to France for the Paris Peace Conference, where her husband and father-in-law went to seek support in Western Europe for the White Army.

The family spent the first years of their exile in France, living in the French Riviera home of Prince Andrei's aunt, Grand Duchess Anastasia Mikhailovna.

Elisabetta and Prince Andrei had three children, the eldest two were born in France and the youngest was born in London:

- Princess Xenia Andreevna (1919–2000) m. 1 1945 to Calhoun Ancrum (1915–1990); they divorced in 1954. m. 2 1958 Geoffrey Tooth (1908–1998). She had no children from either marriage.
- Prince Michael Andreevich (1920–2008) m. 1 1953 Jill Murphy (1921–2006); they divorced in 1953. m. 2 1954 Shirley Cramond (1916–1983). m. 3 1993 Giulia Crespi (b. 1930). Michael had no children from any of his marriages.
- Prince Andrew Andreevich (1923–2021) m. 1 1951 Elena Durneva (1927—1992). They had one son before divorcing in 1959. m. 2 1961 Kathleen Norris (1935–1967). They had two children. m. 3 1987 Inez Storer (born 1933). From 31 December 2016 to 28 November 2021, some of Emperor Nicholas I's descendants recognized him as head of the Romanov Family.

While living outside of Russia, Elisabetta was diagnosed with cancer, which left her very weak.

The family lived without much money and, with Prince Andrei not able to find steady occupation, they depended much on the charity of wealthier family members outside of Russia. They eventually settled in England; first at Frogmore and later at Wilderness House, a grace and favor residence on the grounds of Hampton Court Palace that was leased to Prince Andrei's mother by George VI.

== Death ==
On 29 October 1940, during World War II, Elisabetta was at Wilderness House when a German air raid occurred. During the raid, a bomb was dropped near the house which caused windows to shatter and ceiling beams to fall. Elisabetta died due to injuries from the blast. Following her death, her husband and children went to stay at Craig Gowan House near Balmoral Castle.

== Works cited ==
- Princess Olga Romanoff. My father and his family. Royalty Digest Quarterly. 2007 N 1.
- Van Der Kiste, John & Hall, Coryne. Once a Grand Duchess: Xenia, Sister of Nicholas II. Sutton Publishing, 2002. ISBN 0-7509-2749-6.
- Willis, Daniel. The Romanovs in the 21st Century: a genealogical Biography. VDM, 2009. ISBN 978-3-639-17480-9.
- Willis, Daniel. The Romanovs in the 21st Century: a genealogical Biography. VDM, 2009. ISBN 978-3-639-17480-9.
