= Les Pechs-du-Vers =

- Commune
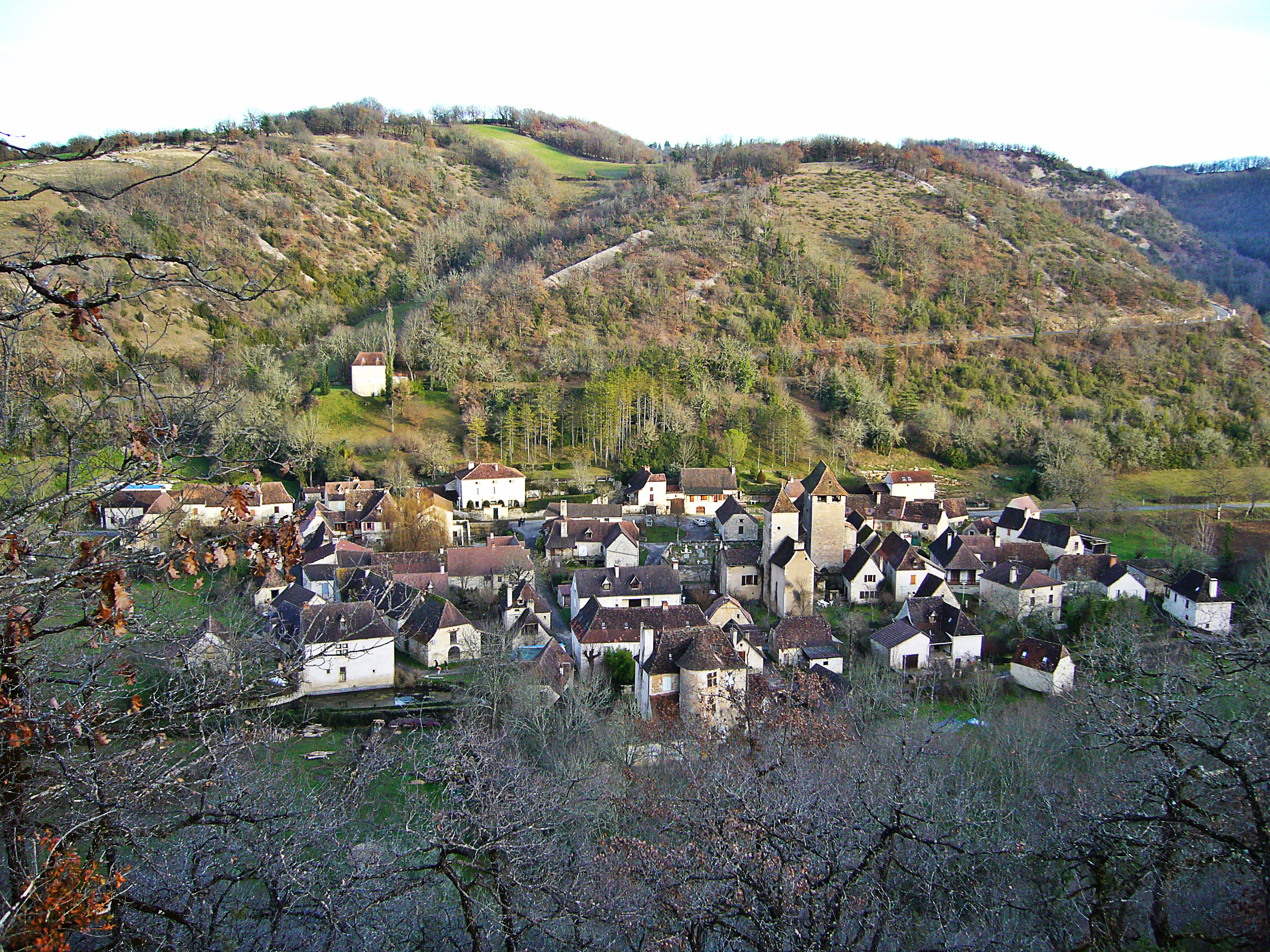
- A general view of Saint-Martin
- Location of Les Pechs-du-Vers
- Location within France Location within Occitanie
- Coordinates: 44°35′35″N 1°34′55″E
- Country: France
- Region: Occitania
- Department: Lot
- Arrondissement: Gourdon
- Canton: Causse et Vallées
- Area^{1}: 26.21 km^{2} (10.12 sq mi)
- Population (2023): 303
  - Density: 11.6/km^{2} (29.9/sq mi)
- Time zone: UTC+01:00 (CET)
  - Summer (DST): UTC+02:00 (CEST)
- INSEE/Postal code: 46252 /46360
- ^{1} French Land Register data, which excludes lakes, ponds, glaciers > 1 km^{2} (0.386 sq mi or 247 acres) and river estuaries.

Les Pechs-du-Vers (French pronunciation: [le pɛʃ dy vɛʁs]; Occitan: Los Puèges de Vèrn) is a commune in the department of Lot, southern France. The municipality was established on 1 January 2016 by merger of the former communes of Saint-Cernin and Saint-Martin-de-Vers.

== See also ==
- Communes of the Lot department
