= Prince Andrei Alexandrovich of Russia =

Imperial Romanov Family Dynast (1897–1981)

Prince Andrew Alexandrovich
- Prince of the Blood Imperial
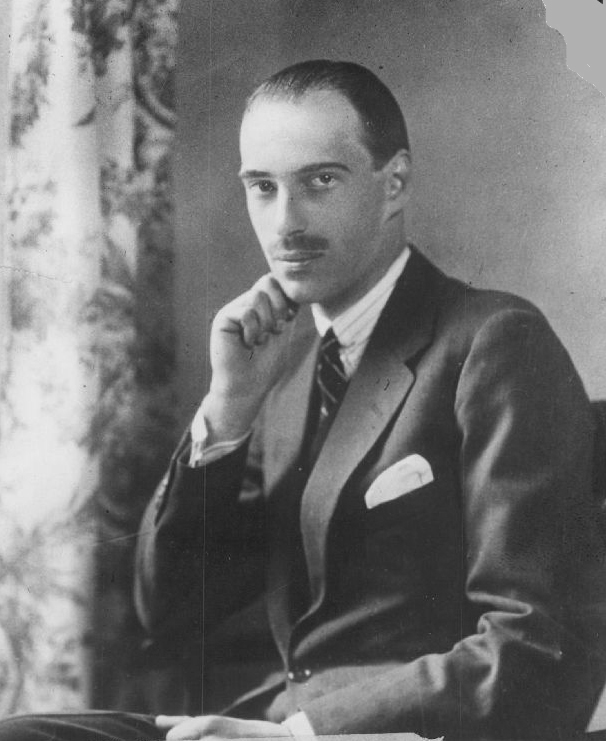
- Andrei in 1920
- Born: 24 January [O.S. 12 January] 1897; Winter Palace, Saint Petersburg, Russian Empire
- Died: 8 May 1981 (aged 84); Provender House, Faversham, Kent, England
- Spouses: Elisabetta di Sasso Ruffo (m. 1918; died 1940) Nadine McDougall (m. 1942)
- Issue: Princess Xenia Andreevna; Prince Michael Andreevich; Andrew Andreevich, Prince of Russia; Princess Olga Andreevna
- House: Holstein-Gottorp-Romanov
- Father: Grand Duke Alexander Mikhailovich of Russia
- Mother: Grand Duchess Xenia Alexandrovna of Russia

Prince Andrew Alexandrovich of Russia (24 January [O.S. 12 January] 1897 – 8 May 1981) was the first son and second child of Grand Duke Alexander Mikhailovich of Russia and Grand Duchess Xenia Alexandrovna of Russia. He was also the eldest nephew of Nicholas II of Russia, the last Tsar.

Born and raised in Imperial Russia during the reign of his uncle Nicholas II, his military career in the Russian navy and the Chevalier guards was cut short by the Russian Revolution. He escaped the fate of many of his relatives that were killed by the Bolsheviks by fleeing to his parents' estate in Crimea, where he was under house arrest with a large group of family members and got married after a couple of years.

In December 1918, he left Russia with his wife and his father. They lived for a couple of years in Paris, France, which had a large population of Russian refugees. Eventually he settled in England in the household of his mother. His wife died during World War II, a victim of the London Blitz. He remarried in 1942. He moved to Provender House in Faversham, Kent, which was owned by the family of his second wife. Alexandrovich lived quietly there as an English country squire until his death. His son, Prince Andrew Andreevich, was claimant to the headship of the Romanov Family until his death in 2021.

== Early life ==
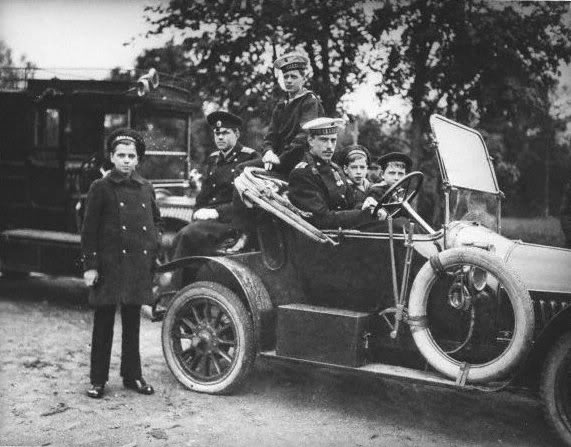
Prince Andrei Mikhailovich with his brothers 1915. From left: Prince Dmitri, Prince Feodor, Prince Nikita, Prince Andrei on the wheel, Prince Rostislav and Prince Vasili.

Prince Andrei Alexandrovich was born at the Winter Palace, Saint Petersburg, the second child and first son of Grand Duke Alexander Mikhailovich and Grand Duchess Xenia Alexandrovna of Russia. Although an Imperial Romanov Family Dynast and a grandson of Emperor Alexander III through his mother, he did not receive the title Grand Duke of Russia because he was a great-grandson of Emperor Nicholas I in the male line through his father. Due to the insistence of his grandmother, the Dowager Empress Maria Feodorovna, he was honoured with a 21 gun salute at birth (which was usually reserved for Grand Dukes), although he was only a Prince of Russia (to be honoured with a 15-gun salute).

His uncle, Nicholas II, wrote to his brother George that: "Her Andrusha is a big, healthy boy, but still very ugly. Please don't tell her [Xenia] that."

In his youth, before World War I, Prince Andrei toured Europe with his parents. At Biarritz, he joined his great uncle King Edward VII of the United Kingdom at the Palace Hotel. Prince Andrei joined the Russian navy and served under his father Grand Duke Alexander Mikhailovich of Russia. Later he became lieutenant in the Chevalier guards, whose colonel-in-chief was his uncle, Emperor Nicholas II. Just before the Russian revolution, he was the only member of his family to accompany the Empress Alexandra and her four daughters on their last visit to the churches of Novgorod. It was the last time he saw them.

== Revolution ==
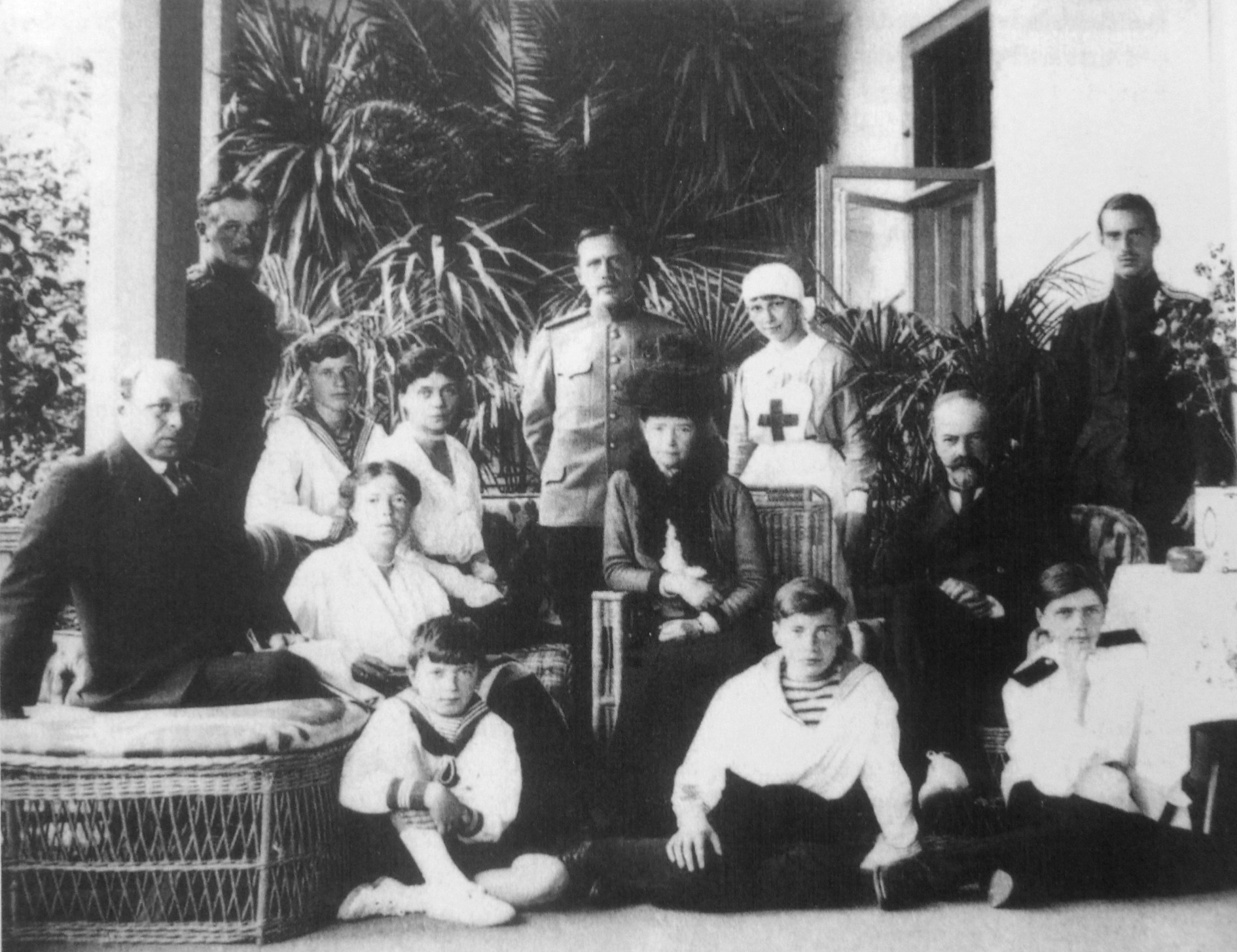
The Romanovs under house arrest in Ai-Todor, 1917. Standing: Colonel Nikolai Kulikovsky, Mr Fogel, Olga Konstantinovna Vasiljeva, Prince Andrei Alexandrovich. Seated : Mr Orbeliani, Prince Nikita, Grand Duchess Olga, Grand Duchess Xenia, The Dowager Empress, Grand Duke Alexander. On the floor: Prince Vasili, Prince Rostislav and Prince Dmitri.

At the fall of the Russian monarchy with the February Revolution in 1917, Prince Andrei moved with his siblings and their parents to his father's property in Crimea, Ai-Todor. A large group of members of the Romanov family gathered there, trying to escape the disturbances in the rest of the country. At first they lived undisturbed while the Russian Provisional Government was in power.

It was during this turbulent period that Prince Andrei began a relationship with Elisabetta Ruffo-Sasso dei duchi di Sasso-Ruffo dei principi di Sant' Antimo, a young divorcée. They had met in St Petersburg in 1916. She was a daughter of Fabrizio Ruffo, Duke of Sasso-Ruffo, and Princess Natalia Alexandrovna Mescherskaya (a descendant of a famous family of the Stroganovs), and distantly related to the Romanovs. Elisabetta had a daughter, (Elisabeth Alexandrovna Friederici), from her first marriage to Major General Alexander Alexandrovitch Friederici (1878–1916) (they had married in 1907). Elisabetta, from the noble house of Ruffo di Calabria, was a cousin of Queen Paola of Belgium.

After Elisabetta became pregnant, the couple married on 12 June 1918 in the family chapel at Ai-Todor in the presence of his family, including his grandmother the Dowager Empress. Prince Andrei was twenty-one years old and his grandmother had thought him too young for marriage, but his parents, Grand Duchess Xenia and Grand Duke Alexander, gave their permission. During this time they could not contact Prince Andrei's uncle, the last reigning emperor, Nicholas II of Russia, who was being held in captivity in internal exile. A month later, Nicholas II was killed with his wife and children while they were held captive in Yekaterinburg on 16/17 July 1918. In later life Prince Andrei rarely spoke of them, as he found the memories too painful.

The situation of the Romanovs in Crimea deteriorated after the successful Bolshevik coup of November 1917. For a time Prince Andrei was imprisoned along with his parents, grandmother the Dowager Empress, and a large number of other Romanov relatives, at Dulber, a palace in Crimea that belonged to Grand Duke Peter Nikolaevich of Russia. In 1918 Russia and Germany were still at war. When German troops invaded the peninsula, they liberated the Romanovs in captivity. In December 1918, Prince Andrei left Russia with his wife, who was pregnant with their first child, and his father, Grand Duke Alexander Mikhailovich aboard the Royal Navy ship HMS Forsythe in order to attend the Paris Peace Conference. He and his father were seeking support in western Europe for the White Army.

== Exile ==
Prince Andrei spent the first couple of years in exile in France. For a time he lived in the French Riviera in a property that belonged to his aunt Grand Duchess Anastasia Mikhailovna of Russia. The two eldest children of Prince Andrei and his wife, who was called Elsa within the family, were born in France and the youngest one in London:

- Princess Xenia Andreevna (1919–2000) m. 1 1945 to Calhoun Ancrum (1915–1990); they divorced in 1954. m. 2 1958 Geoffrey Tooth (1908–1998). She had no children from either marriage.
- Prince Michael Andreevich (1920–2008) m. 1 1953 Jill Murphy (1921–2006); they divorced in 1953. m. 2 1954 Shirley Cramond (1916–1983). m. 3 1993 Giulia Crespi (b. 1930). Michael had no children from any of his marriages.
- Prince Andrew Andreevich (1923–2021) m. 1 1951 Elena Durneva (1927–1992). They had one son before divorcing in 1959. m. 2 1961 Kathleen Norris (1935–1967). They had two children. m. 3 1987 Inez Storer (born 1933). From 31 December 2016 to 28 November 2021, most of Emperor Nicholas I's descendants recognized him as head of the Romanov Family.

Short of money and without a steady occupation, Prince Andrei eventually settled permanently in England, firstly at Frogmore. They later moved to Hampton Court, where his mother Grand Duchess Xenia had a grace-and-favour residence named Wilderness House. They were living there during World War II when Elisabetta, already near death from cancer, died following an air raid in October 1940. One bomb hit very close to their house, causing a ceiling beam to fall onto Elisabetta. She died shortly thereafter.

Two years later, while staying in Balmoral, Prince Andrei met his second wife Nadine McDougall (1908–2000). She was the eldest of three daughters of Lieutenant Colonel Herbert McDougall and his Finnish wife Sylvia Borgström. They became engaged on 18 June 1942 and married at Norton, Kent church, near Provender on 21 September 1942. The Archbishop of Canterbury, William Temple, officiated the Anglican service. The Russian Orthodox wedding was presided by Archimandrite Nicholas who, as Sydney Gibbes, had been tutor of the children of Tsar Nicholas II.

Prince Andrei had one daughter from his second marriage:

- Princess Olga Andreevna (b. 1950) m. 1975 Thomas Mathew (b. 1945). They had four children.

In 1949, Prince Andrei moved into Provender House in Faversham, Kent, which was owned by the family of his second wife. The house was noted as having been a hunting lodge of Edward, the Black Prince. Provender was the prince's only real home in exile.

He spent his time gardening, entertaining, and cooking, which he had learnt from the French chefs in his parents' palaces. He was an artist and had several exhibitions of his works in Paris before World War II. He designed the cover of Let's Light the Candles, a memoir by his mother-in-law. Over the years he came to enjoy his role as an English country squire, opening church fetes and sporting charitable causes, particularly in the village where he lived.

He had some outside interests as well. After the death of his mother Grand Duchess Xenia, he inherited her position as President of the Legat Ballet. His nephew, the Marquess of Milford Haven, appointed him as president of the Chaine des Rotisseurs for London and the Home Counties. Prince Andrei was the protector of the Sovereign Order of the Orthodox Knights Hospitaller of St. John of Jerusalem.

Prince Andrei Alexandrovich lived quietly until his death at home in Faversham on 8 May 1981, aged 84. He was buried in the church at Norton. His widow died in 2000.

== Ancestry ==
Ancestors of Prince Andrei Alexandrovich of Russia

8. Nicholas I of Russia
4. Grand Duke Michael Nikolaevich of Russia
9. Princess Charlotte of Prussia
2. Grand Duke Alexander Mikhailovich of Russia
10. Leopold, Grand Duke of Baden
5. Princess Cecilie of Baden
11. Princess Sophie of Sweden
1. Prince Andrei Alexandrovich of Russia
12. Alexander II of Russia
6. Alexander III of Russia
13. Princess Marie of Hesse and by Rhine
3. Grand Duchess Xenia Alexandrovna of Russia
14. Christian IX of Denmark
7. Princess Dagmar of Denmark
15. Princess Louise of Hesse-Kassel
