= Franz Bachelin =

German art director (1895–1980)

- Born: 10 November 1895; Sinsheim, Grand Duchy of Baden, German Empire (now Baden-Württemberg, Germany)
- Died: 26 May 1980 (aged 84); Pacific Palisades, California, U.S.
- Occupation: Art director
- Years active: 1937–1966
- Children: Inez Storer

Franz Bachelin (10 November 1895 – 26 May 1980) was a German art director. In 1946, he and Hans Dreier did the art direction for The Searching Wind. He was nominated for an Academy Award in the category Best Art Direction for the film Journey to the Center of the Earth.

Bachelin's last credited work as a cinema art director was for part two of the US television series Star Trek episode "The Menagerie". Bachelin originally assumed responsibility for art direction for the originally-planned Star Trek pilot episode "The Cage" after the first art director for the series pilot, Pato Guzman, left the production company to repatriate to his native Chile. This original series pilot was turned down by the National Broadcasting Company (the first television network to broadcast Star Trek), and was only released in 1988 as a filler episode in Paramount Television's Star Trek: The Next Generation television series during a writers' strike. Bachelin did not receive screen credit for his work on "The Cage".

== Selected filmography ==
- The Hitler Gang, Paramount Pictures (1944)
- The Searching Wind (1946)
- Stalag 17 (1953)
- The Naked Jungle (1954)
- War and Peace, Paramount Pictures & Ponti-deLaurentitis (1955)
- Journey to the Center of the Earth (1959)
- Star Trek, Desilu (1964)
- Batman, Fox (1966)
