= Prince Andrew Romanoff =

Russian artist and author (1923–2021)

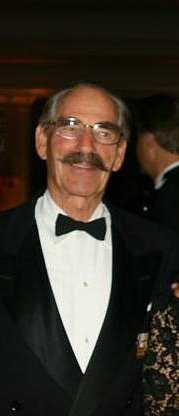

Head of the House of Romanov (disputed)
- Tenure: 31 December 2016 – 28 November 2021
- Predecessor: Prince Dimitri Romanovich
- Successor: Prince Alexis Andreievich
- Born: 21 January 1923; St Pancras, London, England
- Died: 28 November 2021 (aged 98); Inverness, California, U.S.
- Spouses: Elena Konstantinovna Durneva (m. 1951; div. 1959) Kathleen Norris (m. 1961; died 1967) Inez Storer (m. 1987)
- Issue: Prince Alexis Andreievich; Prince Peter Andreievich; Prince Andrew Andreievich
Names
- Andrew Andreievich Romanov
- House: Holstein-Gottorp-Romanov
- Father: Prince Andrei Alexandrovich of Russia
- Mother: Donna Elisabetta Sasso-Ruffo, Princess of San-Antimo
- Religion: Russian Orthodox Church
- Military career
- Allegiance: Great Britain
- Service: Royal Navy
- Service years: 1942–1946
- Rank: Sailor
- Conflicts: World War II; Battle of the Atlantic; Arctic Convoys; North African campaign; Normandy landings; Pacific Theater

Prince Andrew Romanoff (born Andrei Andreievich Romanoff; 21 January 1923 – 28 November 2021) was a Russian American artist and author. He was a grand-nephew of Russia's last Tsar, Nicholas II. He was a great-great-grandson in the male line of Emperor Nicholas I of Russia and since the death of Prince Dimitri Romanov in 2016 was claimant to the headship of the House of Romanov until his own death in 2021.

== Childhood and education ==
Andrew Andreievich was born on 21 January 1923, in St Pancras, London, England, into the family of Prince Andrei Alexandrovich of Russia (1897–1981) and his first wife Princess Elizabeth Fabricievna, née Duchess of Sasso-Ruffo and Princess of San-Antimo. His godfather was the future King Edward VIII of the United Kingdom.

The third child and youngest son in the family, Andrew Andreievich spent his childhood with his sister, Princess Xenia Andreievna, and his brother, Prince Michael Andreievich, in the guest house of Windsor Castle – granted to his family by King George V. Until age 12, he studied at home and received a private traditional education, characteristic for the House of Romanov. He was subsequently educated at Haileybury.

== Life in the United States ==
Following his discharge from the Royal Navy at the end of World War II, Andrew Andreievich became an intern on an English farm in Kent, learning to become an agronomist. He also worked in a special garden near London. Finding no further prospects in Europe, after the invitation in 1949 of his uncle Prince Vasily Alexandrovich, along with his cousin Prince Nikita Nikitich, and having only 800 dollars in his pocket, he immigrated to the United States on a cargo ship carrying racehorses, pigeons, and eight passengers.

After settling in California, he started working in a store, then worked with his uncle at California Packing, where he grew tomatoes using hydroponics and worked on the introduction of new varieties of vegetables.

He studied sociology and criminology at the University of California at Berkeley. Then he worked as a broker in a shipping company and spent three years in Japan and Korea. After his return to San Francisco, Andrew Andreievich became a real estate agent. He also worked as a simple employee behind the chair factory and became a designer. He became a naturalised U.S. citizen on 20 December 1954.

Following the death of his second wife, he moved to the town of Inverness, Marin County, California, where he worked as a carpenter and joiner, and later was engaged in a jewellery business.

He began to draw as a primitive artist, without formal art education, drawing pictures by intuition and relying on imagination. Andrew Andreievich also engaged in artistic photography. After retirement, he devoted himself entirely to art. On his preferred medium of Shrinky Dinks (plastic sheets that shrink by two-thirds when cooked in an oven), he drew and painted, shrinking the scenes, then mounted them on painted panels. Andrew's artwork was firmly rooted in the traditions of American folk art. His work typically depicted personal memories, impressions of American news, culture, and scenes of domestic life.

Andrew Andreievich lived with his wife, the American painter Inez Storer, in Inverness, California. In 2007, he released an autobiography called The Boy Who Would Be Tsar, illustrated with his artwork. His work has been exhibited worldwide, including recent exhibitions at Gallery 16 in San Francisco.

He died on 28 November 2021, at an assisted living facility in San Anselmo, California.

== Marriages and children ==
Prince Andrew married three times. He was married firstly in San Francisco on 9 September 1951, to Elena Konstantinovna Durneva (1928, Tokyo, Japan – 1993, Oakland, California). She was the only daughter of Russian nobleman Konstantin Afanasievich Durnev (1896–1970) and wife Felixa Stanislavovna Zapalska (1903–2001). They had one son before divorcing in 1959:

- Prince Alexis Andreievich Romanov (born 1953, San Francisco). He graduated from St. Mary's High School in San Francisco, and then studied at the University of California, Berkeley. Currently, he owns a company which provides accounting and fiduciary services to individuals. He married on 19 September 1987, in Oakland, California, to Zoetta "Zoe" Leisy (born 1956, Memphis, Tennessee), daughter of Robert Leisy and wife Ellen Telfer. No issue.

He was married secondly to Kathleen Norris (1935, San Francisco – 1967, San Francisco) in San Francisco on 21 March 1961. She was a paternal granddaughter of American authors Charles Gilman Norris and wife Kathleen Norris. She died after pneumonia at age 32. They had two children:

- Prince Peter Andreievich Romanoff (born 1961, San Francisco). He worked as an auto mechanic. His current job is also related to cars. He married on 2 May 2009, in Marin County, California, Barbara Anne Jurgens (born 1968). No issue. He is first in the line of succession to the title of the head of the Romanov Family.
- Prince Andrew Andreievich Romanoff (born 1963, San Francisco). He graduated from the University of California, Berkeley and works as a Project Manager. He married on 12 July 1986, in Point Reyes Station, California, to Elizabeth Flores (born 25 April 1964, San Francisco). She is daughter of Armando Flores and wife Cecil Sherrod. He is second in the line of succession to the title of the head of the Romanov Family. They have one daughter.

He was married thirdly on 17 December 1987, in Reno, Nevada, to the American artist Inez Storer (née Bachelin; born 1933, Santa Monica, California). She is daughter of Franz Bachelin and wife Anita Hirschfeld.

== Title and style ==
Members of the House of Romanov born after the Russian revolution, such as Andrew, tended to use the title Prince, appropriate style and the surname Romanov. As the younger son of a great grandson of a Russian Emperor, formally Andrew was titled His Serene Highness Prince of the Imperial Blood Andrew Andreievich.

On account of his parents' marriage Andrew’s claim to this princely title was never recognised by Grand Duke Kirill, Grand Duke Vladimir or Grand Duchess Maria. In 1951 Grand Duke Vladimir recognised the title Prince Romanovsky for Andrew and his siblings. However they rejected this title.

== Ancestry ==
Ancestors of Prince Andrew Romanoff

8. Grand Duke Michael Nikolaevich of Russia
4. Grand Duke Alexander Mikhailovich of Russia
9. Princess Cecilie of Baden
2. Prince Andrei Alexandrovich of Russia
10. Alexander III of Russia
5. Grand Duchess Xenia Alexandrovna of Russia
11. Maria Feodorovna, born Princess Dagmar of Denmark
1. Prince Andrew Andreievich of Russia
12. Girolamo Ruffo, Prince of Spinoso
6. Fabrizio Ruffo, Duke of Sasso Ruffo
13. Elena Filomarino dei Principi della Rocca d'Aspro
3. Elisabetta Ruffo dei Duchi di Bagnara
14. Prince Alexander Vasilyevich Meshchersky
7. Princess Natalya Alexandrovna Meshcherskaya
15. Countess Elizaveta Sergeievna Stroganova

Prince Andrew Romanoff House of Holstein-Gottorp-Romanov Cadet branch of the House of Oldenburg Born: 21 January 1923 Died: 28 November 2021
Titles in pretence
Preceded by Prince Dimitri Romanovich	Head of the House of Romanov (disputed); 31 December 2016 – 28 November 2021	Succeeded by Prince Alexis Andreievich
