= Saint-Martin-de-Vers =

- Part of Les Pechs-du-Vers
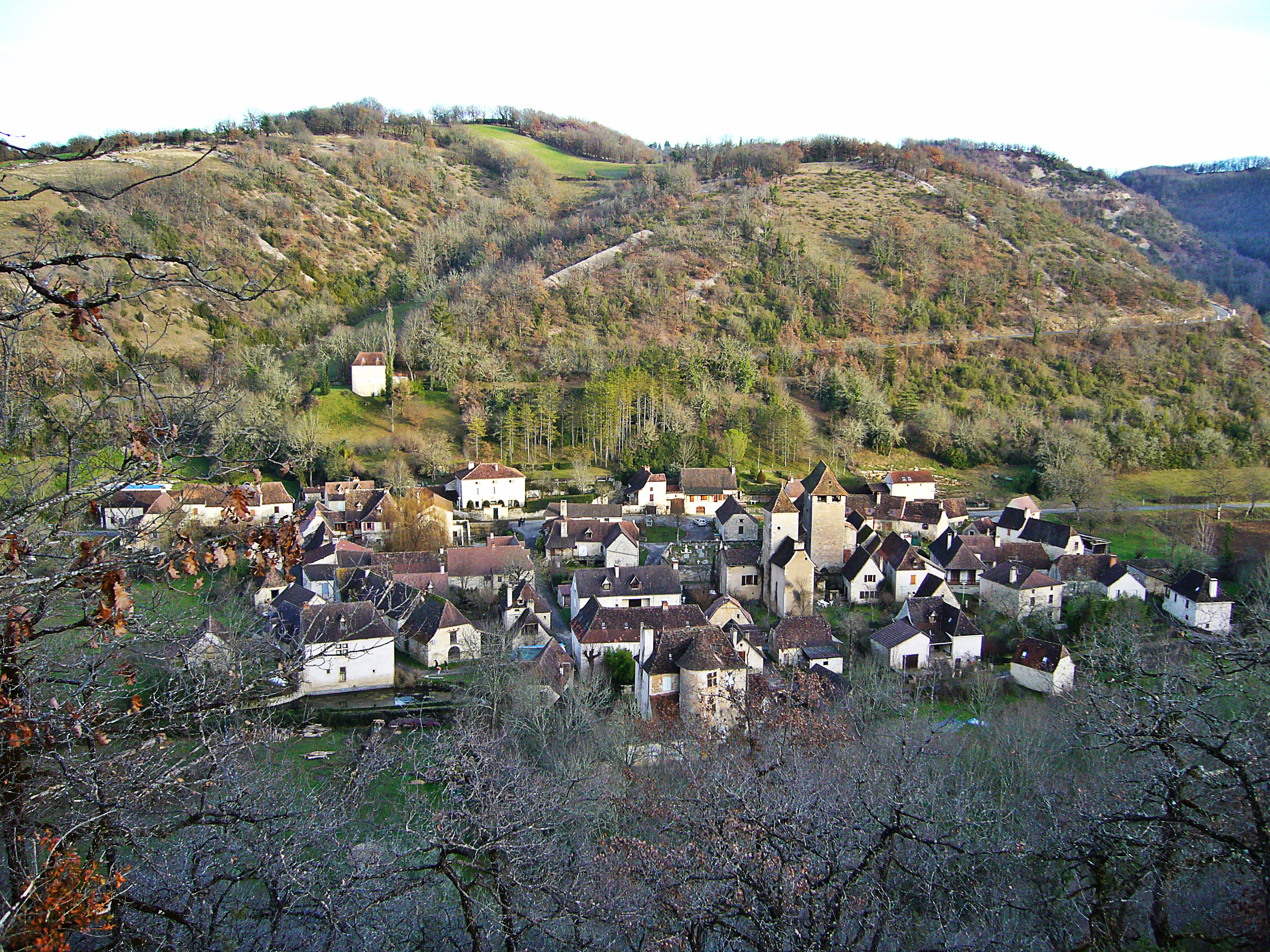
- A general view of Saint-Martin-de-Vers
- Location of Saint-Martin-de-Vers
- Location within France Location within Occitanie
- Coordinates: 44°34′54″N 1°33′34″E
- Country: France
- Region: Occitania
- Department: Lot
- Arrondissement: Cahors
- Canton: Causse et Vallées
- Commune: Les Pechs-du-Vers
- Area^{1}: 9.93 km^{2} (3.83 sq mi)
- Elevation: 365 m (1,198 ft)
- Highest elevation: 423 m (1,388 ft)
- Lowest elevation: 190 m (620 ft)
- Population (2022): 108
  - Density: 10.9/km^{2} (28.2/sq mi)
- Time zone: UTC+01:00 (CET)
  - Summer (DST): UTC+02:00 (CEST)
- Postal code: 46360
- ^{1} French Land Register data, which excludes lakes, ponds, glaciers > 1 km^{2} (0.386 sq mi or 247 acres) and river estuaries.

Saint-Martin-de-Vers (Languedocien: Sent Martin de Vèrn) is a former commune in the Lot department in south-western France. On 1 January 2016, it was merged into the new commune of Les Pechs-du-Vers. Its population was 108 in 2022.

== See also ==
- Communes of the Lot department
