= Saint-Cernin, Lot =

Saint-Cernin
- Part of Les Pechs-du-Vers
- Location of Saint-Cernin
- Location within France Location within Occitanie
- Coordinates: 44°35′37″N 1°34′59″E
- Country: France
- Region: Occitania
- Department: Lot
- Arrondissement: Cahors
- Canton: Causse et Vallées
- Commune: Les Pechs-du-Vers
- Area^{1}: 16.28 km^{2} (6.29 sq mi)
- Elevation: 380 m (1,250 ft)
- Highest elevation: 464 m (1,522 ft)
- Lowest elevation: 227 m (745 ft)
- Population (2022): 198
  - Density: 12.2/km^{2} (31.5/sq mi)
- Time zone: UTC+01:00 (CET)
  - Summer (DST): UTC+02:00 (CEST)
- Postal code: 46360
- ^{1} French Land Register data, which excludes lakes, ponds, glaciers > 1 km^{2} (0.386 sq mi or 247 acres) and river estuaries.

Saint-Cernin (French pronunciation: [sɛ̃ sɛʁnɛ̃]; Languedocien: Sent Sarnin) is a former commune in the Lot department in south-western France. On 1 January 2016, it was merged into the new commune of Les Pechs-du-Vers.

== See also ==
- Communes of the Lot department
