= Wilderness House =

Historic house in London, England

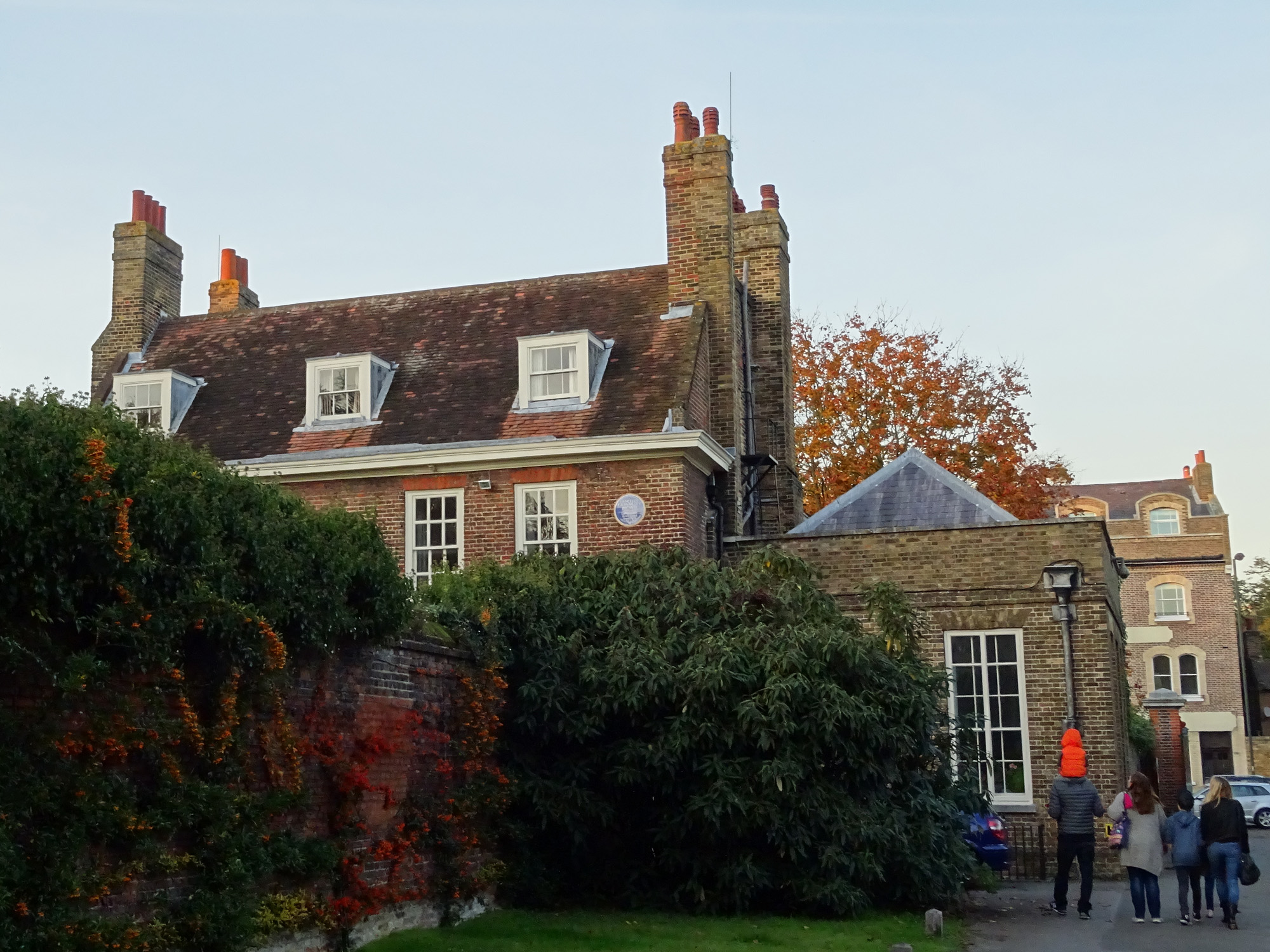
- Wilderness House at Hampton Court Palace, a Grade II* listed estate house once home to Capability Brown

- Location in Richmond upon Thames

General information
- Type: Historic house
- Location: Hampton Court Palace, London, England
- Coordinates: 51.4013°N 0.3372°W
- Completed: Early 18th century

Listed Building – Grade II*
- Official name: Wilderness House
- Designated: 2 September 1952
- Reference no.: 1080808

Wilderness House is a historic house situated within the gardens of Hampton Court Palace in the London Borough of Richmond upon Thames. Built around 1700, it was originally constructed as the residence of the Master Gardener and is closely associated with the early development of the palace gardens. The house is listed at Grade II* on the National Heritage List for England for its architectural and historic significance.

== History ==
Wilderness House was constructed circa 1700, during the period when Hampton Court Palace was undergoing significant landscaping works under William III. Early records identify it as the "Master Gardener's House," and it appears in early eighteenth‑century views of Hampton Court by Leonard Knyff, indicating that it was completed by about 1702. In this period, Henry Wise served as Master Gardener and was responsible for much of the early garden development at Hampton Court. The house was part of the gardener's official residence and is thought to have been built in connection with Wise's appointment.

In 1764, the house became the residence of the landscape architect Capability Brown, who was appointed Chief Gardener at Hampton Court Palace by George III and moved into Wilderness House. Brown lived there for the majority of his tenure, commissioning additions such as a dining room and kitchen and overseeing changes to the gardens; a blue plaque commemorates his residence at the property. Brown remained at Wilderness House until his death in 1783.

Wilderness House remained the Master Gardener's residence until the late nineteenth century. After 1881 it was adapted for use as a grace-and-favour residence and modernised with electricity in 1907 and a bathroom in 1912. From 1937 to 1960, the house was occupied by Grand Duchess Xenia Alexandrovna of Russia, sister of Nicholas II, who converted part of the interior into a Russian Orthodox chapel for her use; the dining room originally added by Brown was retained and repurposed for worship.

== Architecture ==
Wilderness House is a largely intact example of an early eighteenth-century brick house. It retains many original interior features, including full-height panelling, staircases, moulded cornices, and period chimneypieces. The building's plan has remained substantially unchanged since its construction, contributing to its architectural importance and high level of preservation.
