= Inez Storer =

American painter (born 1933)

- Princess Andrew Romanoff
- Born: Inez Mary Bachelin; October 11, 1933 (age 92); Santa Monica, California, U.S.
- Spouse: Thomas Storer (divorced) Prince Andrew Romanoff (m. 1987; died 2021)
- Issue: 4
- Father: Franz Bachelin
- Mother: Anita Hirtfield

Inez Mary Romanoff (née Bachelin, formerly Storer; born October 11, 1933), known as Inez Storer, is an American painter and mixed-media artist who creates work in the magical realism genre.

== Biography ==
Storer was born in Santa Monica, California, on October 11, 1933, to a Catholic father, the German art director Franz Bachelin, and a Jewish mother, Anita Hirtfield. She was raised in her father's Catholic faith. When her mother was on her deathbed, Storer learned that her mother fled Germany to escape Nazism. Storer had believed that there was more to her family's past than she had been told and had suspected that she had Jewish ancestry since the age of thirteen. Storer's mother said that all of her relatives had died, but after her mother's death, Storer reportedly located more than two dozen cousins, some living in California.

As a child, she spent time on Hollywood movie sets with her father, Franz Bachelin, who worked as an art director. From 1951 to 1955, Storer attended the San Francisco College for Women, and she earned a bachelor's degree in art from the Dominican College in 1970. She earned her master's degree in 1971 from California State University, San Francisco (now San Francisco State University).

From 1968 through the 1970s, she taught at the College of Marin in Kentfield. She held a teaching appointment at San Francisco State University from 1970 to 1973. She taught briefly at UC Santa Cruz in 1976 and then at Sonoma State University from 1976 to 1988. Storer also taught at the San Francisco Art Institute from 1981 to 1999. Storer was a visiting artist at the American Academy in Rome in 1996 and 1997.

Storer lives in Inverness, California, and was married (from 1987 until his death in 2021) to Prince Andrew Romanoff, an artist and the grandnephew of Nicholas II, Russia's last emperor. She was a friend of author Philip K. Dick.

== Style and influences ==
Storer's paintings are richly textured, mixed-media collages that often include a playful juxtaposition between contemporary cultural icons and historical objects or references. She paints in a faux-naïve style. The process she uses to create her work involves creating many layers and then "peeling away the surface to come back to the first marks." Writing that appears in her work is considered "childlike." An article in the Philadelphia Weekly pointed to the influence of Storer's ancestry in her art, saying, "The frustration at being kept from the truth has given Storer's art a kind of angry edge."

Her 2004 exhibition at the National Museum of American Jewish History was organized by the museum at Santa Clara University and concerned personal identity and the discovery of her heritage. A 2003 review in the San Jose Mercury News said, "Pictures, we like to think, should yield up their meanings easily – at least pictures of the real world: flowers, animals, people and the like. So it can be a bit discomfiting when our expectation of such instant understanding is thwarted, as so often happens in the art of Inez Storer." Her art is also influenced by Hollywood stage design and can be in seen in the "theatrical space" that her female figures inhabit in much of her work. Storer's art often deals with difficult issues that are hidden within symbols and children's stories. Her work has been compared to that of artists such as Wassily Kandinsky, Paul Klee, Jean-Michel Basquiat, Henri Rosseau, Marc Chagall and Salvador Dalí.

== Exhibits and collections ==
Work by Storer is held by museums including the de Young, the Reno Museum of Art, the San Jose Museum of Art, the Monterey Museum of Art, the Missoula Museum of Art in Montana, the Linda Lee Alter Collection of Art by Women of the Pennsylvania Academy of the Fine Arts, and the National Museum of American Jewish History in Philadelphia.

== Awards and honors ==
- Pollock-Krasner Foundation Grant (1999)
- Distinguished Woman Artist Award from Fresno Art Museum's Council of 100 (1999)
