= Grand Duchess Xenia Alexandrovna of Russia =

Grand Duchess of Russia

Grand Duchess Xenia Alexandrovna
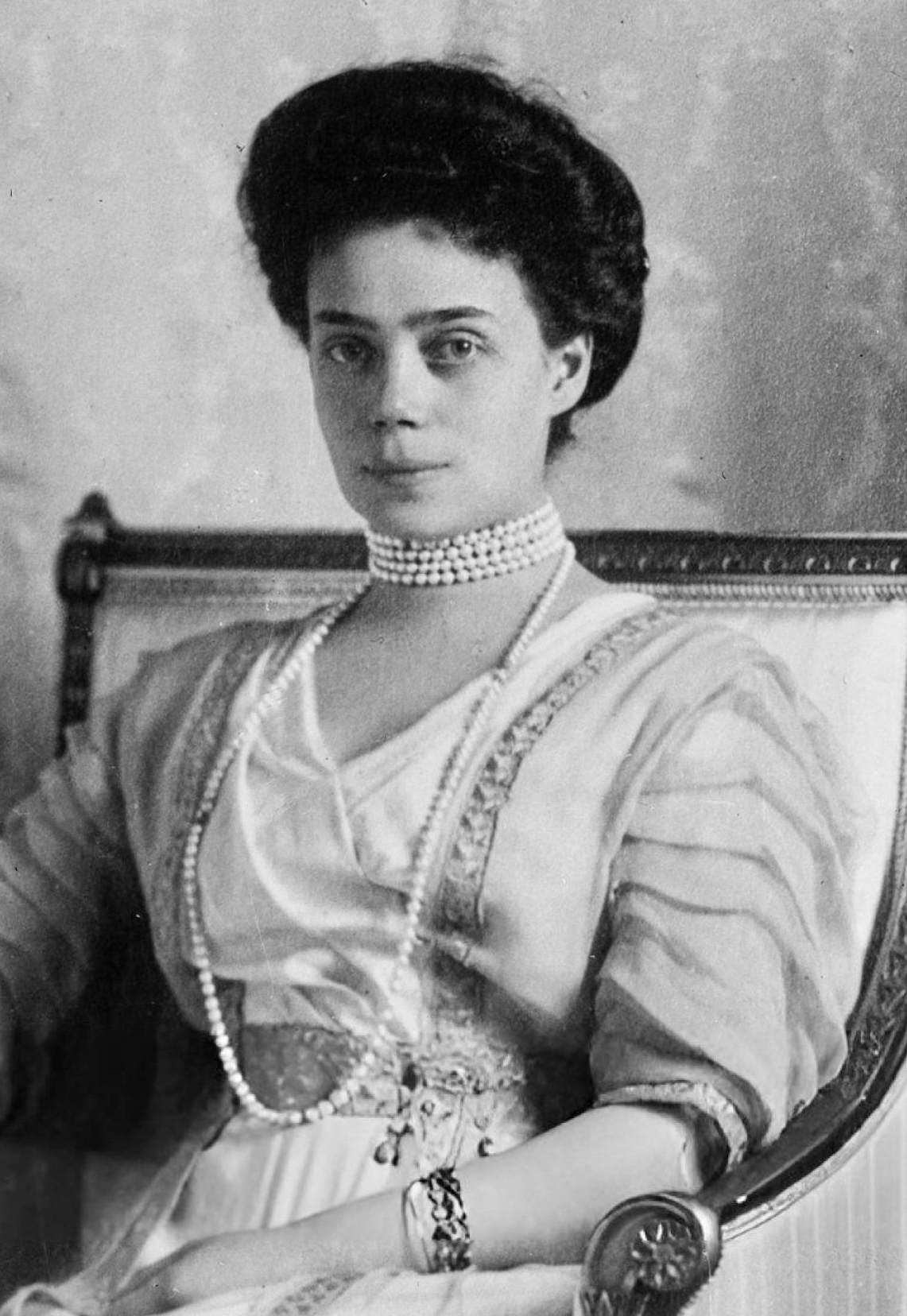
- Grand Duchess Xenia, 1910s
- Born: 6 April 1875; Anichkov Palace, Saint Petersburg, Russia
- Died: 20 April 1960 (aged 85); Wilderness House, Hampton Court Palace, Richmond upon Thames, England
- Burial: Cimetière de Roquebrune-Cap-Martin, Roquebrune-Cap-Martin, France
- Spouse: Grand Duke Alexander Mikhailovich of Russia (m. 1894; died 1933)
- Issue: Princess Irina Alexandrovna; Prince Andrei Alexandrovich; Prince Feodor Alexandrovich; Prince Nikita Alexandrovich; Prince Dmitri Alexandrovich; Prince Rostislav Alexandrovich; Prince Vasili Alexandrovich
Names
- Xenia Alexandrovna Romanova
- House: Holstein-Gottorp-Romanov
- Father: Alexander III of Russia
- Mother: Dagmar of Denmark

Grand Duchess Xenia Alexandrovna of Russia (Russian: Ксения Александровна; 6 April [O.S. 25 March] 1875 – 20 April 1960) was the elder daughter and fourth child of Emperor Alexander III of Russia and Dagmar of Denmark. She was the sister of the last Russian emperor, Nicholas II.

She married her father's cousin, Grand Duke Alexander Mikhailovich of Russia, with whom she had seven children. She was the mother-in-law of Felix Yusupov and a cousin of Grand Duke Dmitri Pavlovich of Russia who, together, killed Grigori Rasputin, holy healer to her nephew, the haemophiliac Tsarevich Alexei Nikolaevich of Russia. During her brother's reign she recorded in her diary and letters increasing concern about his rule. After the fall of the monarchy in February 1917, she fled Russia, eventually settling in the United Kingdom.

== Early life ==
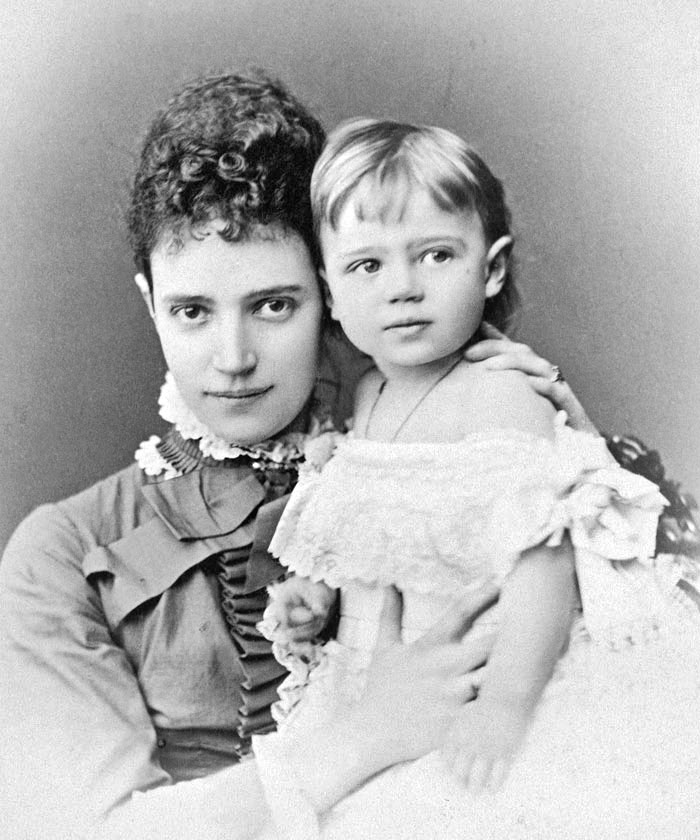
Xenia with her mother, 1878

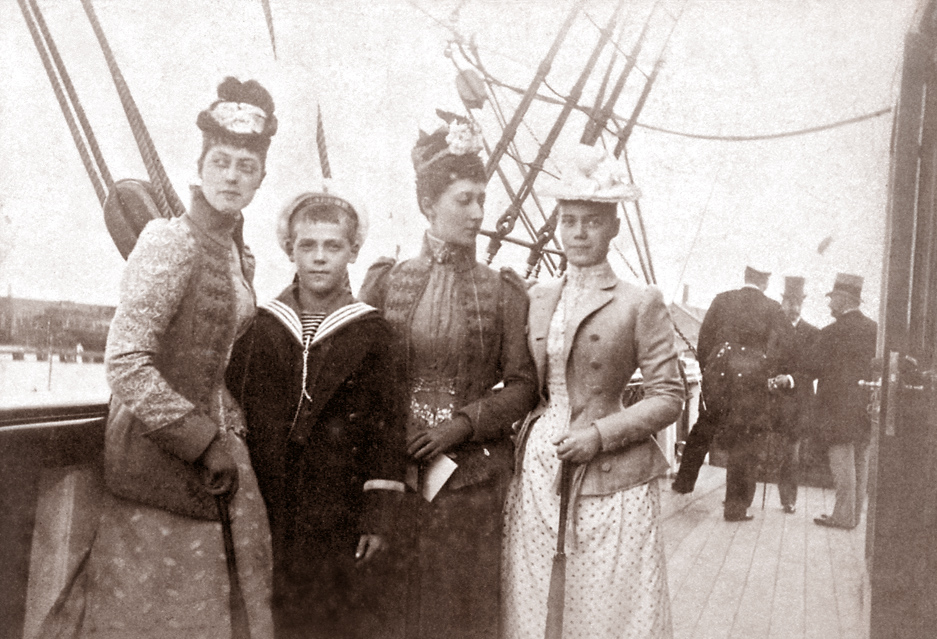
Xenia (right), with her brother Michael Alexandrovich and cousins, Victoria and Louise, daughters of Edward VII c. 1893

Xenia born on 6 April [O.S. 25 March] 1875 at the Anichkov Palace in St. Petersburg. She was the elder daughter among the six children of the Tsesarevich Alexander and his wife, Grand Duchess Maria Feodorovna of Russia (née Princess Dagmar of Denmark).

After the assassination of her paternal grandfather Tsar Alexander II of Russia (13 March [O.S. 1 March] 1881), when Xenia was five years old, her father ascended to the Russian throne as Emperor Alexander III. It was a difficult time politically, plagued with terrorist threats. For security reasons, Alexander III moved with his family from the Winter Palace to Gatchina Palace. There Xenia and her siblings enjoyed a relatively simple childhood: sleeping on cot beds, waking at 6 am, and taking cold baths every morning. Their rooms were simply furnished, albeit comfortable.

Like her brothers, Xenia was educated by private tutors, with special emphasis on the study of foreign languages. Apart from her native Russian, Xenia studied English, French, and German. She learnt cookery, joinery, and making puppets and their clothes for their theatre. She also enjoyed riding and fishing on the Gatchina estate, drawing (for which she supposedly had a particular talent), gymnastics, dancing, and playing the piano.

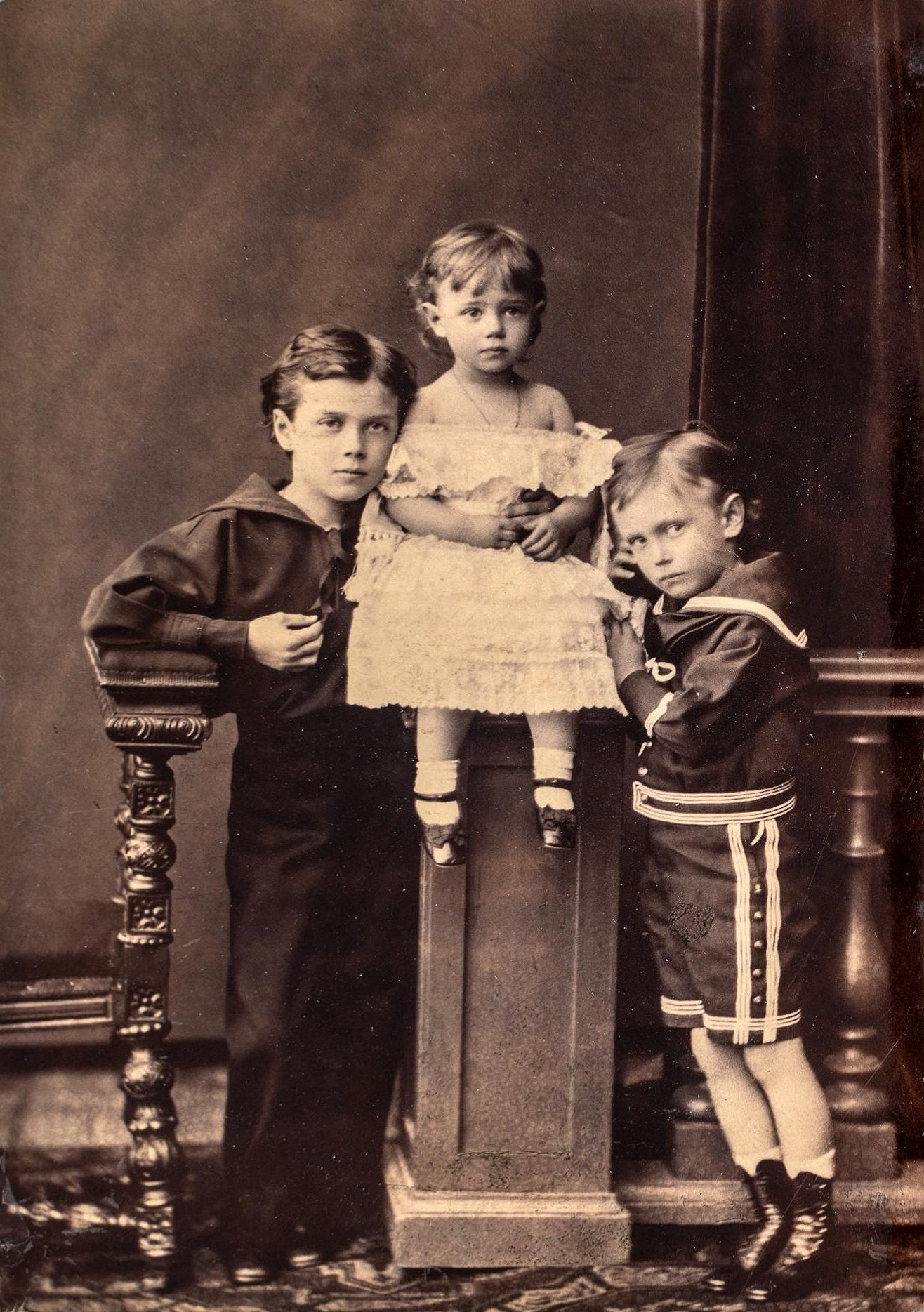
Ksenia Alexandrovna with her brothers (Tsarevich Nikolai and vel. Prince George). Around 1879.

Her entire family enjoyed family holidays at the home of her Danish maternal grandparents, Fredensborg Castle. On one of these visits she met her cousin and lifelong friend, Princess Marie of Greece, daughter of King George I of Greece and of his Russian-born wife, Queen Olga. The Danish composer, Valdemar Vater, paid Xenia a tribute by writing the "Polka Mazurka".

== Early marriage ==
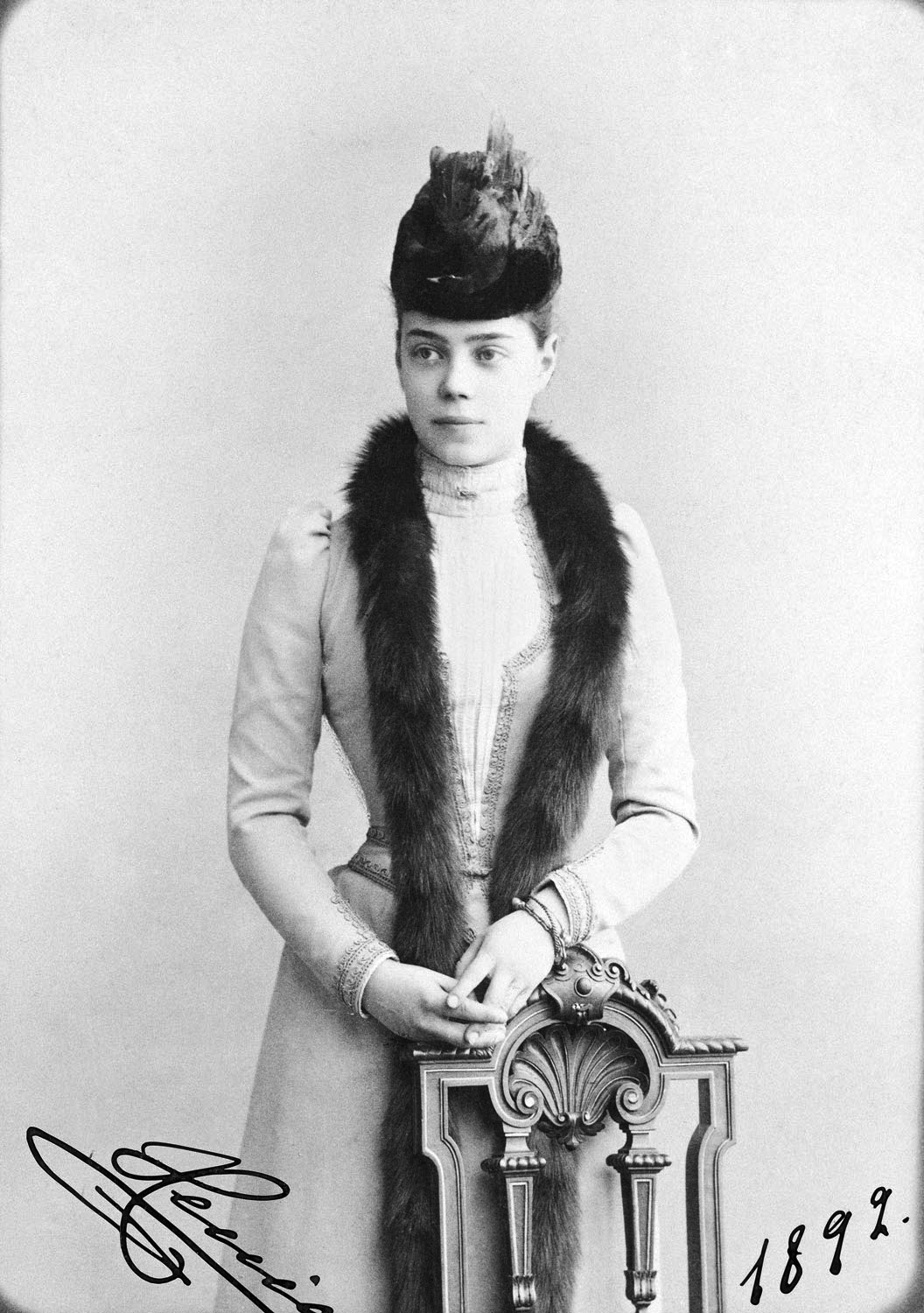
Grand Duchess Xenia, 1892

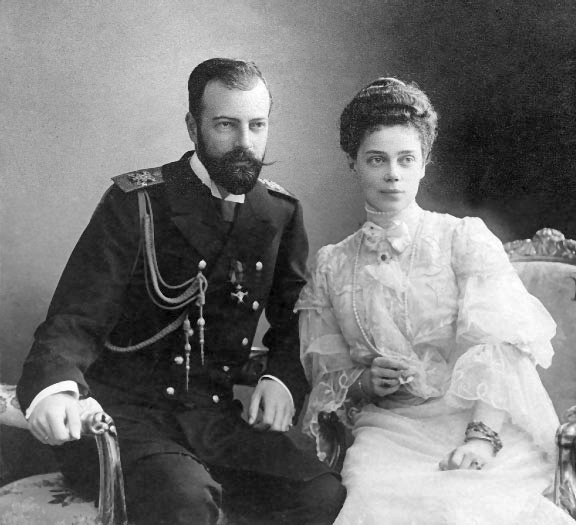
Xenia with her husband c. 1890s

Xenia and her paternal first cousin once removed Grand Duke Alexander Mikhailovich of Russia, her eventual husband, played together as friends in the 1880s. Alexander, usually called Sandro, was also a friend of her brother, Nicholas. In 1886, 20-year-old Alexander was serving in the navy. Eleven-year-old Xenia sent him a card when his ship was in Brazil, "Best wishes and speedy return! Your sailor Xenia". In 1889, Alexander wrote of Xenia, "She is fourteen. I think she likes me."

At age 15, though Xenia and Alexander wanted to marry, her parents were reluctant because Xenia was too young and they were unsure of Alexander's character. The Tsarina Maria Feodorovna had complained of Alexander's arrogance and rudeness. It was not until 12 January 1894 that Xenia's parents accepted the engagement, after Alexander's father, Grand Duke Michael Nikolaievich of Russia, intervened.

The couple were very attached to each other. In a letter to their brother George, Xenia's brother Nicholas wrote: "They have become quite impossible, presumably from prolonged yearning and being so used to each other. They spend the whole day kissing, embracing and lying around on the furniture in the most improper manner. Xenia in particular is completely impossible." George responded: "They almost broke the ottoman and generally behaved in the most improper way. For instance, they would lie down on top of each other, even in my presence, in what you might call an attempt to play Papa and Mama."

The couple finally wed on 6 August 1894, when Xenia was 19, in the SS Peter & Paul Chapel of the Peterhof Palace. Xenia's younger sister, Olga, wrote about the joy of the wedding, "The Emperor was so happy. It was the last time I ever saw him like that." They spent their wedding night at Ropsha Palace, and their honeymoon at Ai-Todor (Alexander's estate in Crimea). During the honeymoon, Xenia's father, Alexander III, became ill and died on 1 November 1894. After his death, Xenia's eldest brother inherited the Crown and became the new Tsar Nicholas II.

Grand Duchess Xenia continued her public displays of affection after her wedding. Tsar Nicholas wrote to his fiancé: "Of one thing she [Xenia] is not shy. That is in kissing her husband. Whenever she can, she flies at him, her arms around his neck."

== Charitable works ==
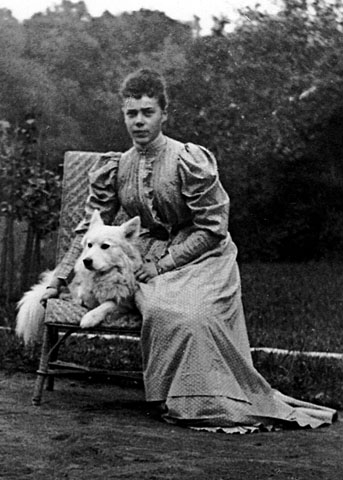
Xenia as a young woman

Xenia contributed strongly to charitable works. She was a member of the Women's Patriotic Association. From 1903, Xenia was patron of the Creche Society of St. Petersburg, which looked after poor working-class children while their parents were at work. She took a particular interest in hospitals for patients with tuberculosis in the Crimea, perhaps influenced by her brother George who suffered from the disease.

She was also patron of the Maritime Naval Welfare Association, which took care of widows and children of naval personnel. Xenia founded the Xenia Association for the Welfare of Children of Workers and Airmen. In addition, she was patron of the Kseniinsky Institute, a St. Petersburg boarding school for 350 students.

== Russo-Japanese War ==
On 25 January 1904, Xenia recorded in her diary that war had been declared between Russia and Japan. The previous December, Xenia had told the War Minister, Kuropatkin, that there would be no war and that her brother did not want war. The War Minister said the whole matter might be outside the control of Russia. As war broke out, there was unrest in Russia.

On a cold Sunday in January 1905, over 150,000 peaceful people approached the Winter Palace under the leadership of Father Gapon. The people wanted to present the Tsar with a petition. The St. Petersburg police had asked for help from the army, which fired into the crowd, resulting in 143 casualties. The day would be known as "Bloody Sunday" and mark a turning point in the relationship between the Tsar and his people. In February, Xenia's uncle Sergei, was killed by a bomb in Moscow. Xenia wanted to be with her aunt Ella, but was told the situation was too dangerous.

Xenia was exasperated on hearing of Russia's military defeat in Korea. She had been angry about the start of the war and recorded her thoughts on the end, "and ended even more stupidly!" Xenia was in the Crimea at their home at Ai-Todor with her husband and children, when news of the mutiny of the Black Sea fleet reached them. In October, her brother was forced to agree to the establishment of a Duma as a concession to the people. Some of Xenia's family saw it as "the end of Russian autocracy". Her husband Sandro had resigned his position at the Ministry of Merchant Marine. Xenia and her family spent Christmas at Ai-Todor as it was not safe to travel north, or from their estate. A Christmas service was held in the house, with the priest being driven there and back "in a closed landau under an escort of cavalry".

== World War I and the collapse of the empire ==
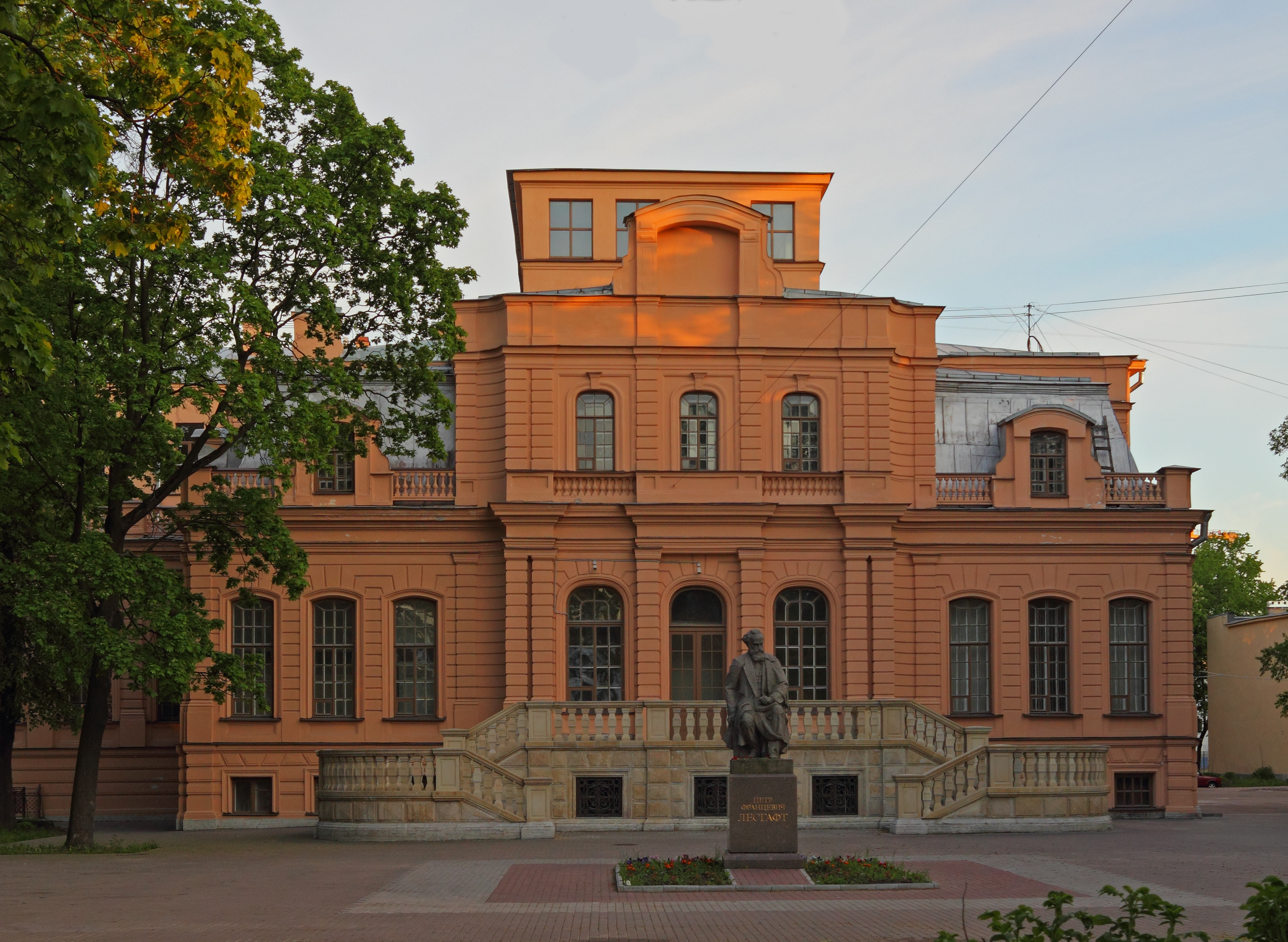
The former mansion of Grand Duchess Xenia Alexandrovna in St. Petersburg

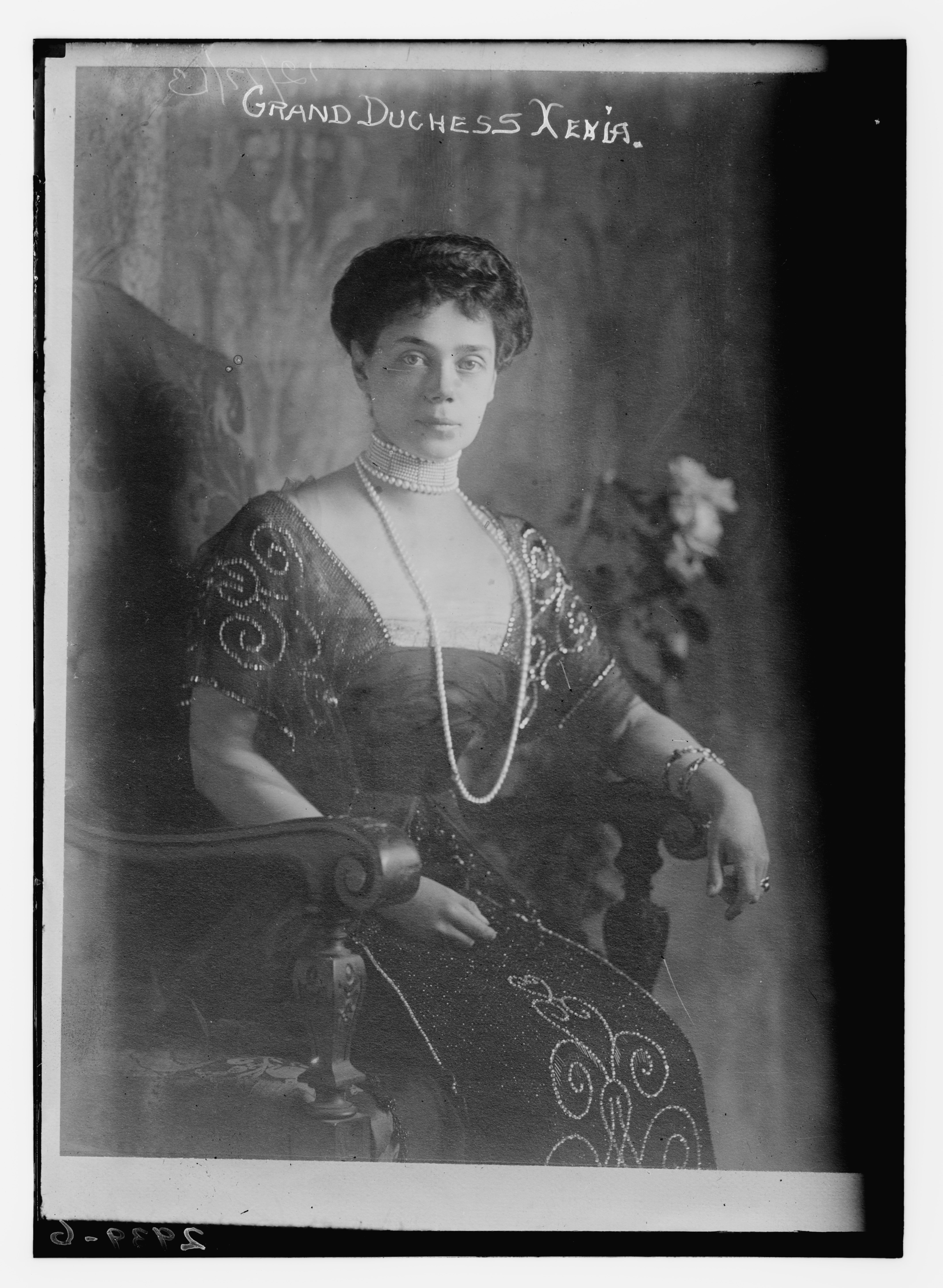
Xenia in 1910

The outbreak of war caught Xenia and her mother unaware: Xenia was in France while the Dowager Empress was in London. They arranged to meet in Calais, where the private train of the Dowager Empress was waiting to take them to Russia, being confident that the German Kaiser Wilhelm II would let them through. Arriving in Berlin, they found the line to Russia had been closed. Hearing that the Yusupovs were also in Berlin, the Dowager Empress ordered that they join the train. An ugly situation ensued in Berlin until finally the train was allowed to travel to Denmark, and then on to Finland.

Arriving back in Russia, Xenia threw herself into war work, providing her own hospital train and opening a large hospital for the wounded. She also chaired the Xenia Institute, which provided artificial limbs for the maimed. In 1915, learning that Nicholas intended to take command of the armed forces, she accompanied her mother to Tsarskoe Selo in an attempt to dissuade him. The Dowager Empress had recorded her lack of confidence in him in this role in her diary, and this was borne out. Xenia returned disheartened to the Yelagin Palace.

In February 1916, Xenia travelled to Kiev after an illness to see her mother and sister Olga. Her sister finally had her shell of a first marriage dissolved by the Tsar and was married in November 1916 to Nikolai Kulikovsky in the presence of the Dowager Empress in Kiev. Xenia was absent. On 28 October 1916, increasingly depressed by Russia's predicament, Xenia wrote to her mother, speculating what her father would have done. Xenia, her mother, and her sister Olga urged Grand Duke Nicholas Mikhailovich to write to the Tsar warning him about the influence of the Tsarina in government affairs. Nicholas did not even open the envelope. The Tsarina read it and accused the Grand Duke of "crawling behind [his] mother and sisters."

Realising the danger, Xenia and her family moved to Ai-Todor in the Crimea. From there, Xenia heard of Rasputin's murder and was embarrassed by the episode. She wrote to her mother in Kiev, "Sleep little. There is rumour that Rasputin is murdered!" Xenia's son-in-law Felix Yusupov had been one of the murderers. At the beginning of 1917, Xenia hoped her mother could make her brother see sense about the collapsing situation in Russia. She wrote in despair, hoping she would persuade him. Her mother felt she could not do anything and that she had no intention of returning to St. Petersburg from Kiev.

On 19 February 1917, Xenia was back in St. Petersburg at her palace. On 25 February, she wrote in her diary, "There are disturbances in the city, there was even shooting into the crowd, [they] say, but everything is quiet on the Nevsky. They are asking for bread and the factories are on strike." On 1 March 1917 she wrote of rumours circulating that Nicholas's train had been stopped, and that he had been forced to abdicate. The Dowager Empress wrote to her about her meeting with Nicholas in Mogilev, "I still can't believe that this dreadful nightmare is real!" Xenia tried to see her brother but was refused permission by the Russian Provisional Government. Seeing no future where she was in St. Petersburg, Xenia left for Ai-Todor on 6 April, her 42nd birthday.

== Exile from Russia ==
Xenia arrived at Ai-Todor where she joined her mother, husband, and sister on 28 March 1917. At the end of November, Xenia wrote to her brother Nicholas in Tobolsk in Siberia,

"The heart bleeds at the thought of what you have gone through, what you have lived and what you are still living! At every step undeserved horrors and humiliations. But fear not, the Lord sees all. As long as you are healthy and well. Sometimes it seems like a terrible nightmare, and that I will wake up and it will all be gone! Poor Russia! What will happen to her?"

In 1918, while in Crimea, Xenia learnt that her brother Nicholas II, his wife, and their children had been murdered by the Bolsheviks. Her other surviving brother, Michael, had been murdered (by shooting) a month earlier outside Perm.

While the Red Army was coming closer to the Crimea, Xenia and her mother, the Dowager Empress Maria, escaped from Russia on 11 April 1919 with the help of Queen Alexandra of the United Kingdom (née Princess Alexandra of Denmark), Dowager Empress Maria's sister. King George V of the United Kingdom sent the British warship HMS Marlborough which brought them and sixteen other Romanovs (including five of her sons) from the Crimea through the Black Sea to Malta, and then to England. Xenia remained in Great Britain, while Dowager Empress Maria, after a stay in England, was joined by Olga at Villa Hvidøre outside Copenhagen in Denmark.

== Later years ==
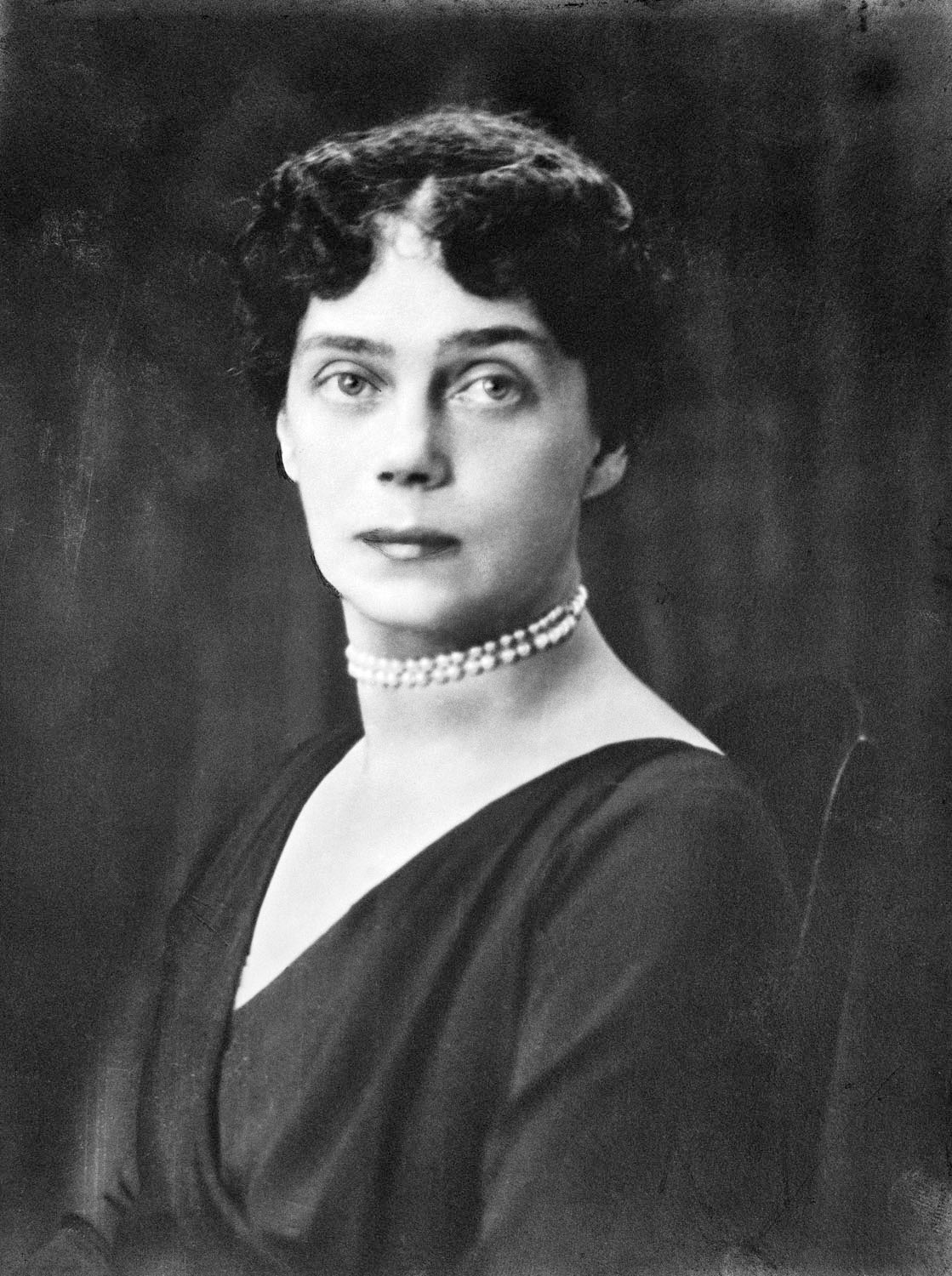
Xenia Alexandrovna c. 1925

On 17 May 1920, Xenia had been granted Letters of Administration as eldest sister and heir to her brother Nicholas's estate in England worth five hundred British pounds sterling. Her husband Sandro was living at this time in Paris. By 1925, Xenia's financial situation had become desperate. King George V, who was her first cousin, allowed her to settle at Frogmore Cottage, a grace and favour house, in Home Park, Windsor, for which she was grateful. Later she had to deal with the fraudulent claims of Anna Anderson to be her niece, the murdered Grand Duchess Anastasia Nikolaevna of Russia. Her sister Olga had pointed out if there had been any Romanov monies left, the Dowager Empress would not be receiving a pension from the British King. In July 1928, ten years after the death of Nicholas and Alexandra, his family were legally presumed dead. Xenia and her family had hoped to take possession of the Langinkoski estate in Kotka, Finland, but this came to nothing.

Xenia visited her mother, the Dowager Empress, in Denmark as often as she could. Her mother was living in a villa, Hvidøre, that she and her sister Alexandra had bought on the Danish coast north of Copenhagen. In 1928, Xenia's mother fell seriously ill and died on 13 October. After the death of her mother, the sale of the Hvidøre estate, and the jewels of the Dowager Empress brought in some income. Upon the death of the Dowager Empress, Xenia received a letter from Gleb Botkin, son of her late brother's doctor, claiming that Xenia was trying to steal from "Anastasia". Her husband declared in a letter to her his disdain for the "vileness" of Botkin.

On 26 February 1933, Xenia's husband Sandro died. Xenia and her sons attended his funeral on 1 March, in Roquebrune-Cap-Martin in the south of France. By March 1937, Xenia had moved from Frogmore Cottage in Windsor Great Park to Wilderness House in the grounds of Hampton Court Palace. Wilderness House was bombed in October 1940 and King George VI decided that she should go somewhere safer for the duration of the war. She therefore lived at Craig Gowan, near Balmoral, and returned to Hampton Court after peace was declared, staying there until her death on 20 April 1960. Despite reduced circumstances during her lifetime, she left a small estate to her remaining relatives.

== Issue and later marriage ==
Xenia and Alexander had seven children together, one daughter followed by six sons:

- Princess Irina Alexandrovna of Russia (15 July 1895 – 26 February 1970) m. Prince Felix Yussupov
- Prince Andrei Alexandrovich of Russia (24 January 1897 – 8 May 1981) m. 1. Elisabetta di Sasso Ruffo, m. 2. Nadine McDougall
- Prince Feodor Alexandrovich of Russia (23 December 1898 – 30 November 1968) m. Princess Irina Pavlovna Paley
- Prince Nikita Alexandrovich of Russia (16 January 1900 – 12 September 1974) m. Countess Maria Vorontsova-Dashkova
- Prince Dmitri Alexandrovich of Russia (15 August 1901 – 7 July 1980) m. 1. Countess Marina Sergeyevna Golenischeva-Kutuzova, m. 2. Margaret Sheila MacKellar Chisholm
- Prince Rostislav Alexandrovich of Russia (24 November 1902 – 31 July 1978) m. 1. Princess Alexandra Pavlovna Galitzine m. 2. Hedwig von Chappuis
- Prince Vasili Alexandrovich of Russia (6 July 1907 – 23 June 1989) m. Princess Natalia Golitsyna

The children were grandchildren of a tsar (Alexander III) through their mother (female line), but only great-grandchildren of a tsar (Nicholas I) through their father (male line). Due to Imperial Family Statutes brought in by Alexander III to limit the rank of Grand Duke and Duchess, they held the title Princes and Princesses of Russia with the style of “Highness”.

One of Xenia's descendants could have become the Head of the Imperial House of Russia, but all of her children, like all the other Romanovs, married morganatically, making them ineligible, in accordance with the old succession laws of Russia. As a result, none of the current descendants of the Romanov Family, including Maria, the daughter of Grand Duke Vladimir Kirillovich Romanov, whose mother was from a family recognised as non-dynastic by the last ruling Emperor of Russia, Nicholas II, are born of a Dynastic Marriage, under the old succession laws of Russia. However, her descendants are the only Romanov descendants of Emperor Alexander III of Russia and the closest Romanov blood relations of Emperor Nicholas II of Russia.

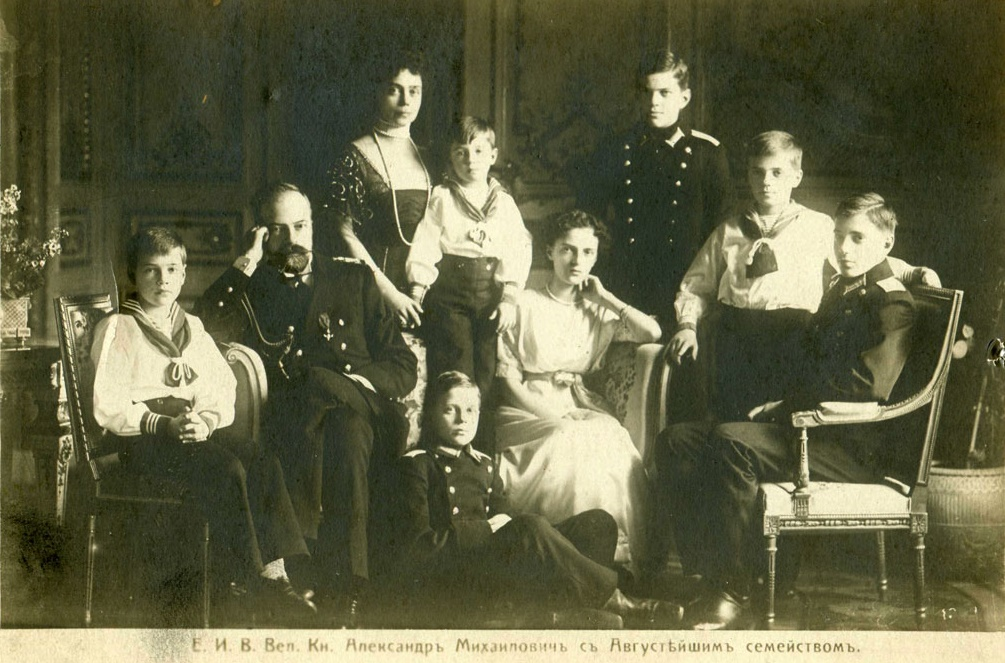
From left to right: Rostislav, Grand Duke Alexander, Grand Duchess Xenia, Vasili, Irina, Nikita (on the floor) Fyodor, Dmitry, Andrei

In 1913, Xenia and Sandro's daughter Irina expressed her intention of marrying Prince Felix Yussupov. He was heir to the largest private fortune in Russia. Felix had decided that Irina would make the perfect wife. Xenia was not happy at the prospect of giving approval to such a marriage, as Felix had a notorious reputation. It was rumoured he had had an affair with Grand Duke Dmitry Pavlovich of Russia. The Dowager Empress had heard the rumour and summoned Felix to meet with her, but Felix's charms won her over. She said, "Do not worry, I will do all that I can for your happiness." Xenia's only daughter was married on 9 February 1914 in the presence of the Tsar, who gave her away. The wedding was held at one of the smaller palaces due to a falling out between Xenia and Tsarina Alexandra. Xenia walked behind with Sandro and her mother.

During Xenia's last pregnancy in 1907, Alexander had an affair with a woman identified only as "Maria Ivanovna" in Biarritz. One year later, Xenia also began to have an affair, with an Englishman named "Fane." Xenia referred to him simply as "F." in her diaries. They corresponded with one another as late as the First World War. After Xenia and Alexander admitted the affairs to each other, their marriage began to fall apart. Though still loving each other, they began sleeping in separate rooms and living separate lives. Prior to the Revolution, Alexander had become disenchanted with the course of events in Russia and court life. Both he and Xenia spent considerable periods of time outside Russia, but both returned before the start of the First World War. Following the Revolution, they separated and managed to escape Russia.

== Family relations ==
Xenia had a close relationship with her brother Nicholas II and his wife before they married. When Nicholas and Alexandra moved into the Alexander Palace after their own marriage, Xenia and Alexander (known in the family as "Sandro") spent the evenings together in the new billiard room. A source of gradual resentment grew between Xenia and Alexandra due to the fact that Xenia had given birth to six healthy sons, whilst Alexandra had four daughters and her only son, Alexei Nikolaevich, was diagnosed with haemophilia. The robust health of Xenia's sons was a constant source of antagonism in the mind of Alexandra. It was only in 1912 that Xenia learnt from her sister Olga that Alix had admitted that Alexei had haemophilia.

The birth of Alexei led to Alexandra obtaining total control over her husband; Trying to find a cure for her son's illness, Alexandra fell under the influence of Rasputin. Like all her family, Xenia was highly skeptical of Rasputin. Family relations were strained. Xenia did remain close to her brother, who often visited when he was in the Crimea, walking with her nieces, Olga and Tatiana; her sister-in-law visited rarely.

Apart from Nicholas, Xenia was devoted to her other two brothers, Grand Duke George Alexandrovich of Russia and Grand Duke Michael Alexandrovich. In 1899, George died in a motorcycle accident, which was traumatic for her. Grand Duke Michael married Natalia Sergeyevna Wulfert without the permission of the Tsar. The couple were exiled as punishment. Xenia was willing to overlook this, as her own marital problems had made her more understanding. She received both Michael and Natalia in 1913 in Cannes in France. Xenia tried to talk to her brother Nicholas about Michael and was told that he could return to Russia at any time, but that Natalia could not. Xenia helped to restore relations between Michael and their mother, the Dowager Empress.

== Archives ==
Xenia Alexandrovna's personal papers (including family correspondence, diaries and photographs) are preserved in the "Grand Duchess Ksenii͡a Aleksandrovna Papers" collection in the Hoover Institution Library & Archives (Stanford, California, USA). Of particular interest in this collection is Xenia Alexandrovna's correspondence with her brother, Emperor Nicholas II of Russia, and her mother Empress Maria Feodorovna. In addition, Xenia Alexandrovna's correspondence with the Romanian diplomat George I. Duca between 1950 and 1960 is preserved in the "George I. Duca Papers" collection in the Hoover Institution Library & Archives (Stanford, California, USA). Xenia Alexandrovna's correspondence with her cousin, Princess Tatiana Constantinovna, between 1927 and 1939 is preserved in the "Romanov Family Papers" collection in the Hoover Institution Library & Archives (Stanford, California, USA).

Xenia Alexandrovna and her staff kept illustrated, hand-written records of her jewellery and objets d'art which survived into her exile.
