= Rescue of the Russian Imperial Family from Yalta =

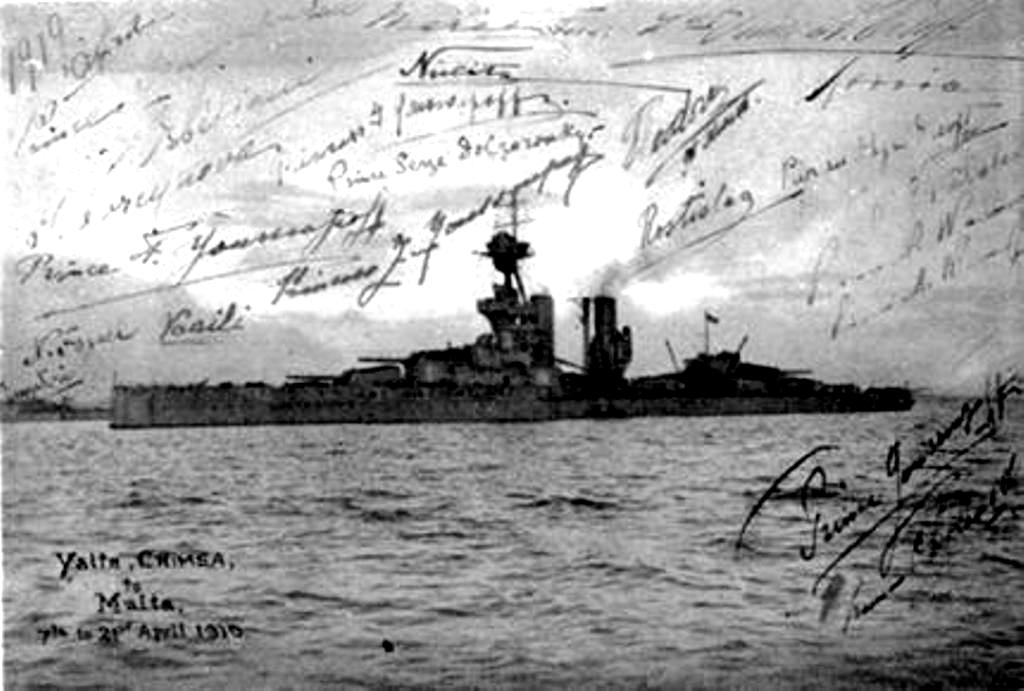
The battleship HMS Marlborough of the Royal Navy, photographed off the coast of Yalta in 1919, was responsible for the evacuation of the Russian imperial family from Crimea.

The rescue of the Russian imperial family from Yalta was an event during the Russian Civil War that took place between 7 and 11 April 1919, when the British government, using the battleship HMS Marlborough, commanded by Captain Charles Johnson, rescued surviving members of the deposed Russian imperial family, along with nobles, servants, soldiers, and refugees associated with the White movement in Yalta, Crimea, during the advance of the Red Army across the peninsula.

== Background ==
Following the February Revolution of 1917 and the abolition of the monarchy, the deposed Emperor Nicholas II, his wife, and their children were placed under house arrest. In the meantime, several members of the House of Romanov decided to leave the capital, Petrograd, and seek refuge in Crimea, where the family owned residences and estates. Among them were the Dowager Empress Maria Feodorovna, her daughters, Grand Duchesses Xenia and Olga Alexandrovna, and their respective husbands, Grand Duke Alexander Mikhailovich and Captain Nikolai Alexandrovich Kulikovsky, together with their children. Grand Dukes Nicholas Nikolaevich and Peter Nikolaevich also joined them, accompanied by their respective wives, Anastasia and Milica of Montenegro, and their children. The family was dispersed among several estates in the Yalta region, including Ai-Todor, the residence of Alexander Mikhailovich, Dulber Palace, belonging to Peter Nikolaevich, and Kharaks.

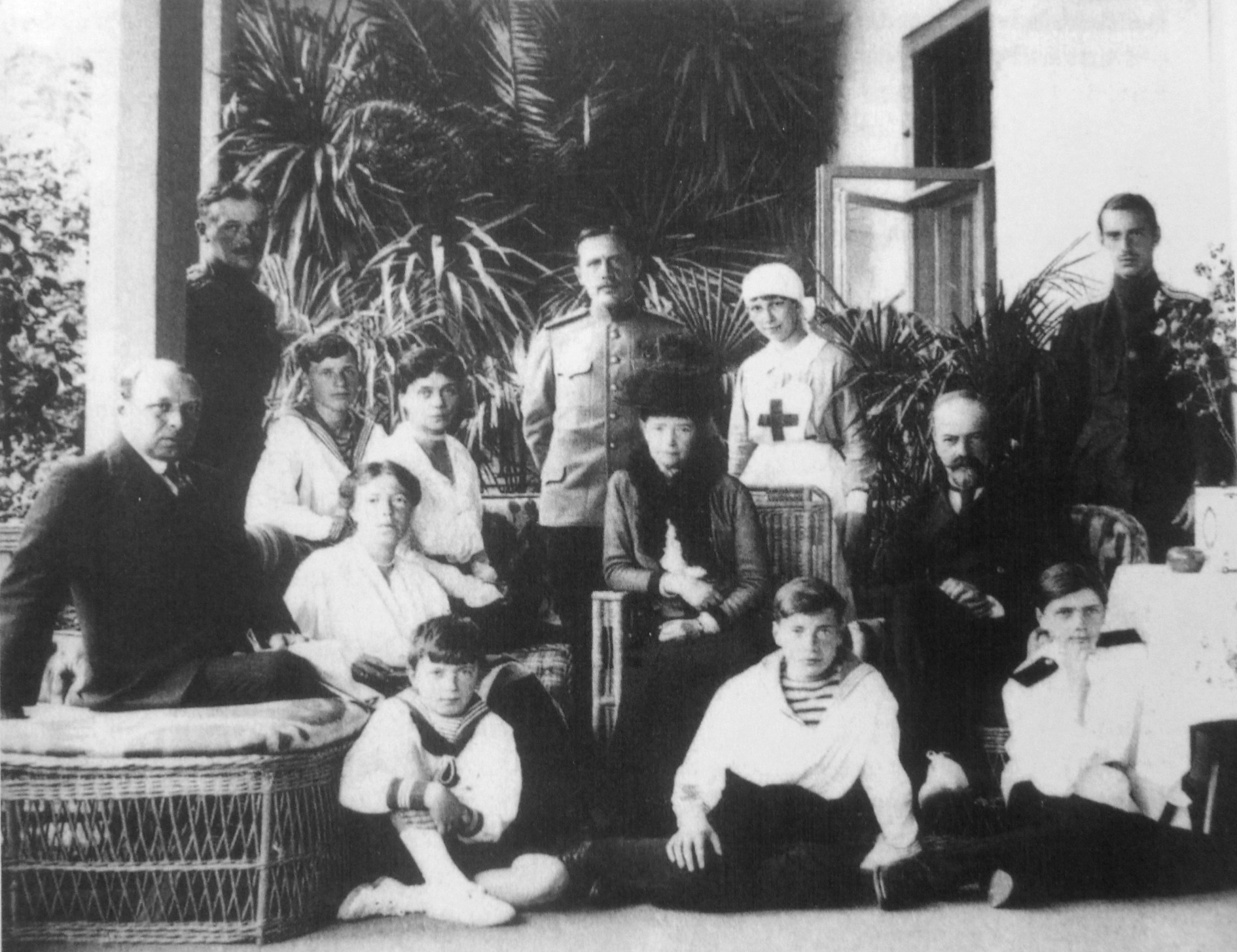
Members of the Romanov family, including the Dowager Empress Maria Feodorovna and her daughters, Grand Duchesses Xenia and Olga Alexandrovna, at the Ai-Todor estate in Yalta, 1918.

During this period, the British government considered rescuing Nicholas, his wife, and their children. King George V was his first cousin through their mothers. However, Nicholas's wife's German origins, at a time when Britain was at war with the German Empire, as well as the unpopularity of the deposed emperor, who was regarded as an autocratic ruler, led the British government to withdraw its offer of asylum. The family was subsequently transferred to Siberia. Following the October Revolution of 1917 and the Bolsheviks' rise to power, the possibility of rescuing them became virtually impossible. In April 1918, Nicholas, his wife, and their children were taken to Yekaterinburg, where they were executed in July, together with all members of their entourage who remained in Bolshevik custody.

Initially, Crimea offered relative security compared with Petrograd, now under Bolshevik control, where persecution of members of the former dynasty who had remained there was intensifying. In January 1919, Grand Dukes Nicholas Mikhailovich and George Mikhailovich, as well as Dmitri Konstantinovich and Paul Alexandrovich, who had remained in the capital and been arrested, were executed. (Note: The four executed grand dukes had not all remained in Petrograd throughout the period preceding their arrest: some were initially sent into exile in Vologda and subsequently returned to the city.) However, as the Russian Civil War progressed, the situation on the peninsula also became increasingly unstable. Against this background, King George V, already aware of the executions of his cousin Nicholas, the four grand dukes, and the Alapayevsk martyrs, (Note: One day after the execution of Nicholas II and his family, his sister-in-law, Grand Duchess Elizabeth Feodorovna—also a first cousin of George V—as well as Grand Duke Sergei Mikhailovich, Princes John, Konstantin, Igor Konstantinovich, and Vladimir Pavlovich Paley, the nun Varvara Yakovleva, and Fyodor Remez, secretary to Sergei Mikhailovich, were executed by the Bolsheviks near Alapayevsk. The victims were subsequently canonized by the Russian Orthodox Church and became known as the "Alapayevsk Martyrs".) became particularly concerned about the fate of his aunt, Maria Feodorovna, and his other relatives, and began efforts to organize their evacuation from Russia.

== The rescue ==
Members of the Romanov family aboard HMS Marlborough
The Dowager Empress Maria Feodorovna

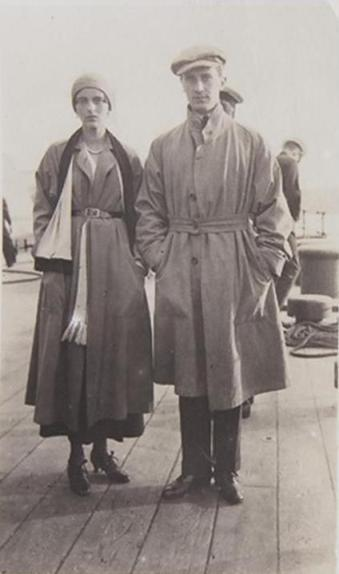
Princess Irina – daughter of Grand Duchess Xenia Alexandrovna – with her husband, Prince Felix Yusupov

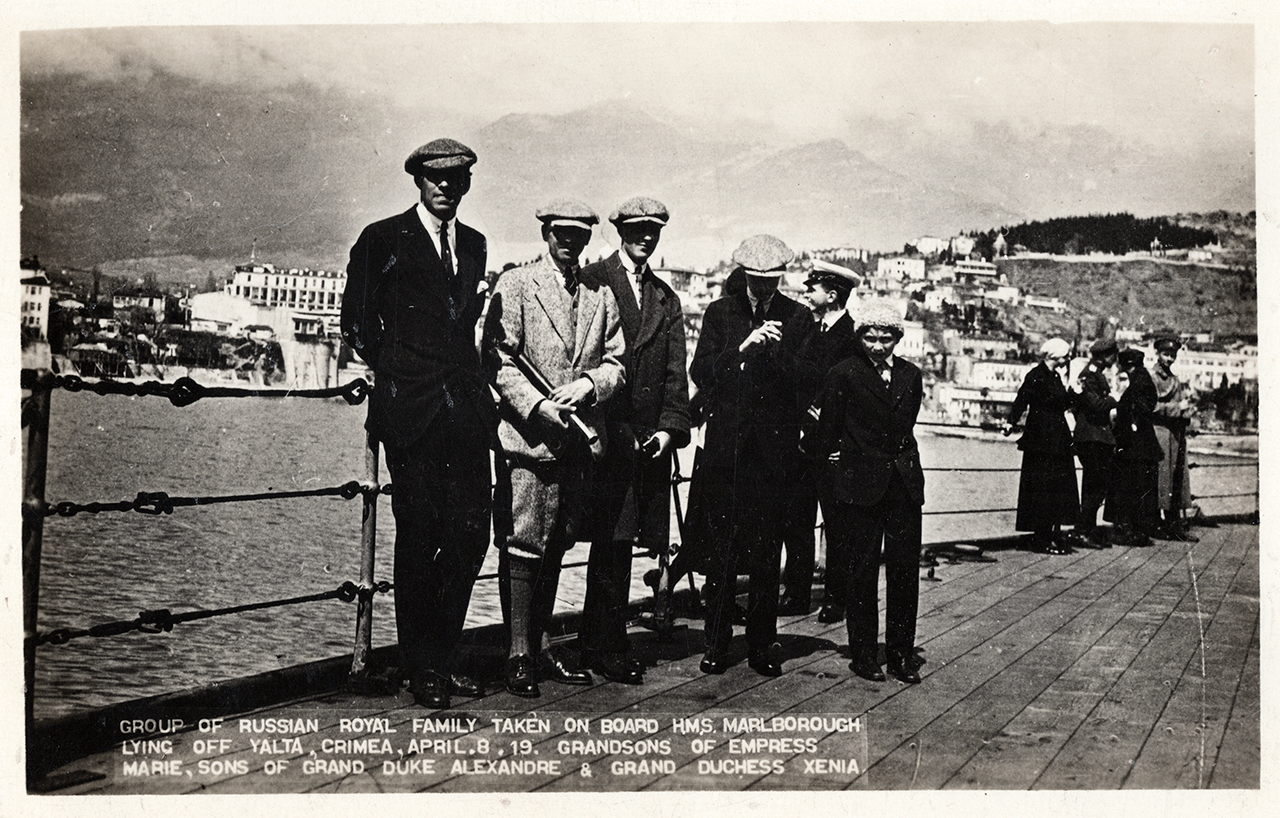
The sons of Grand Duchess Xenia Alexandrovna – Princes Feodor, Nikita, Dmitri, Rostislav, and Vassili Alexandrovich

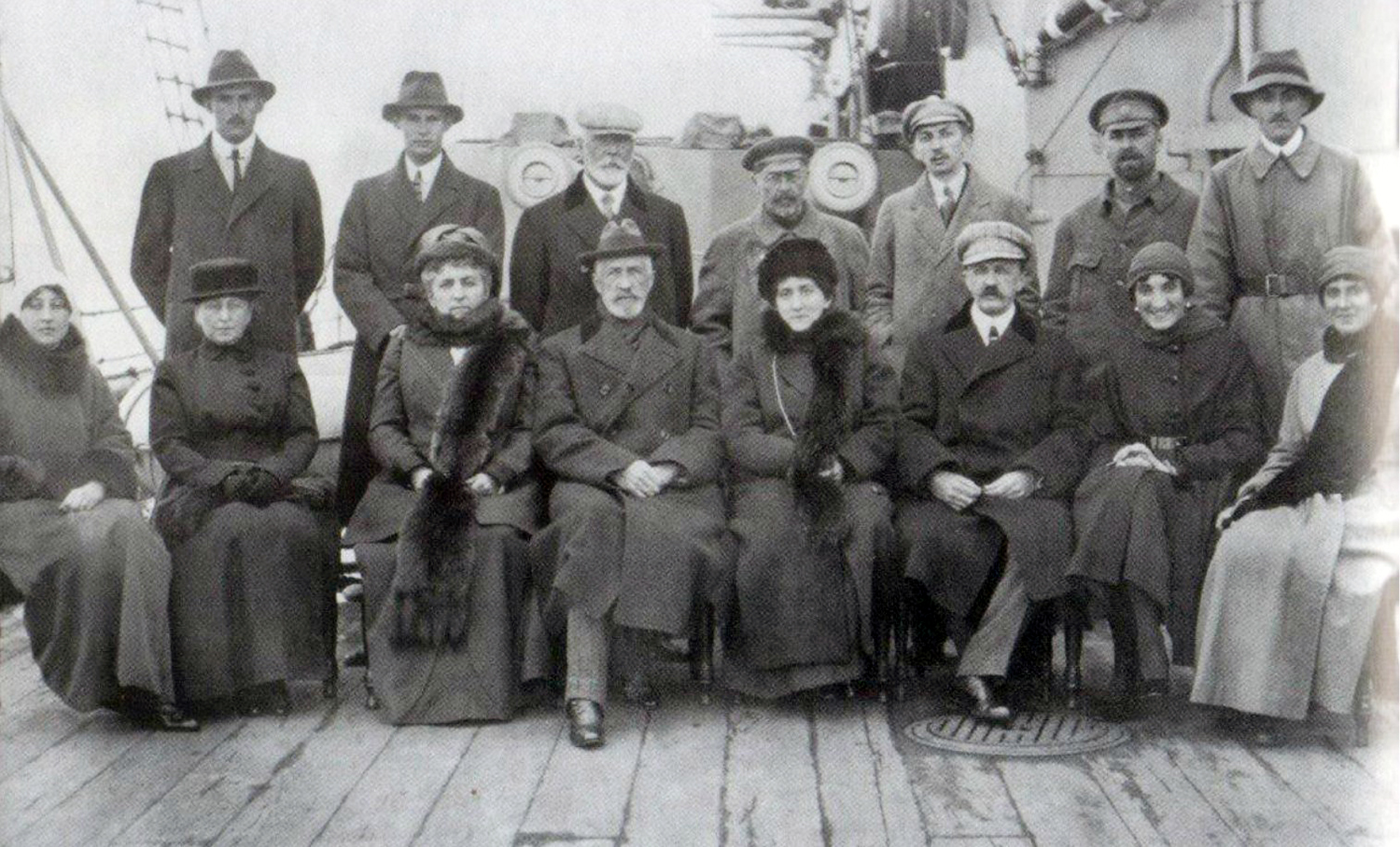
Grand Dukes Nicholas Nikolaevich and Peter Nikolaevich, accompanied by their respective wives, Anastasia and Milica of Montenegro. Milica is pictured alongside her children with Peter: Marina, Nadezhda Petrovna, and Roman Petrovich, as well as other members of their entourages.

With the withdrawal of German troops from Crimea in November 1918 and the advance of the Red Army, the safety of the Romanov family members in the peninsula was once again threatened. The family members in Crimea were reportedly all sentenced to death by the Revolutionary Council of Yalta, but the executions were postponed because of political rivalries between the Soviet authorities in Yalta and Sevastopol.

Against this background, Queen Mother Alexandra of the United Kingdom wrote to Maria Feodorovna, her sister, urging her to leave Russia immediately. Through his mother, King George V offered asylum in England to the surviving members of the Romanov family and dispatched the battleship HMS Marlborough to carry out their evacuation. On 4 April 1919, the ship departed Constantinople for Sevastopol, carrying a letter from Alexandra informing Maria Feodorovna that the vessel was available to take her to Malta and subsequently to England. After meeting the Dowager Empress, Captain Charles Johnson ordered the ship to proceed to Yalta, where the embarkation of the imperial family members would begin.

Initially, the Dowager Empress refused to board the ship in response to her sister's letter until she was assured that all those loyal to the family in that part of Crimea would be taken to safety, including nobles, servants, soldiers, and refugees associated with the White movement. Although the exact number is unknown, the party reportedly consisted of approximately 80 people, including 44 members of the royal family and nobility, as well as numerous governesses, nurses, maids, and male servants, together with hundreds of pieces of luggage. On 7 April, as Bolshevik forces advanced, Maria Feodorovna finally boarded the ship at a small cove near the Harax estate in Koreiz, accompanied by Grand Duchess Xenia Alexandrovna. Having resigned herself to her fate, she recorded in her diary: "Today it is two years since we arrived here... At the time, I thought it would only be for a few months and that I would be able to return home to St. Petersburg. ‘Man proposes, but God disposes’."

During the first stage of the evacuation, other members of the Romanov family also boarded the ship, including Grand Dukes Nicholas and Peter Nikolaevich, accompanied by their families and respective entourages. Only Grand Duchess Olga Alexandrovna refused to leave Russia at that time, choosing instead to move to the Caucasus with her husband and children. Her family would eventually leave the country as well, in 1920, during the Evacuation of Novorossiysk.

In the following days, the remaining members of the party and their luggage continued to board, with the assistance of approximately 120 officers from the former Imperial Russian Army. As the ship had not been designed to accommodate such a large number of passengers, its officers made approximately 35 cabins available, installing additional bunks, mattresses, and other equipment to increase its accommodation capacity. The captain's quarters, in turn, were reserved for Maria Feodorovna.

The ship remained off Yalta while the evacuation of refugees from the region continued, in accordance with the Dowager Empress's insistence that the withdrawal should not end until everyone wishing to leave had been given the opportunity to board. Finally, on 11 April 1919, HMS Marlborough departed Crimea, carrying hundreds of people, including passengers and crew members, initially bound for Constantinople.

== See also ==
- White émigré
- Evacuation of Crimea
- Evacuation of Novorossiysk
- Execution of the Romanov family

== Bibliography ==
- Welch, Frances (2011). The Russian Court at Sea: The Voyage of HMS Marlborough, April 1919. Short Books. ISBN 9781906021788.
