= Vladimir Nikolayevich Orlov =

Russian nobility

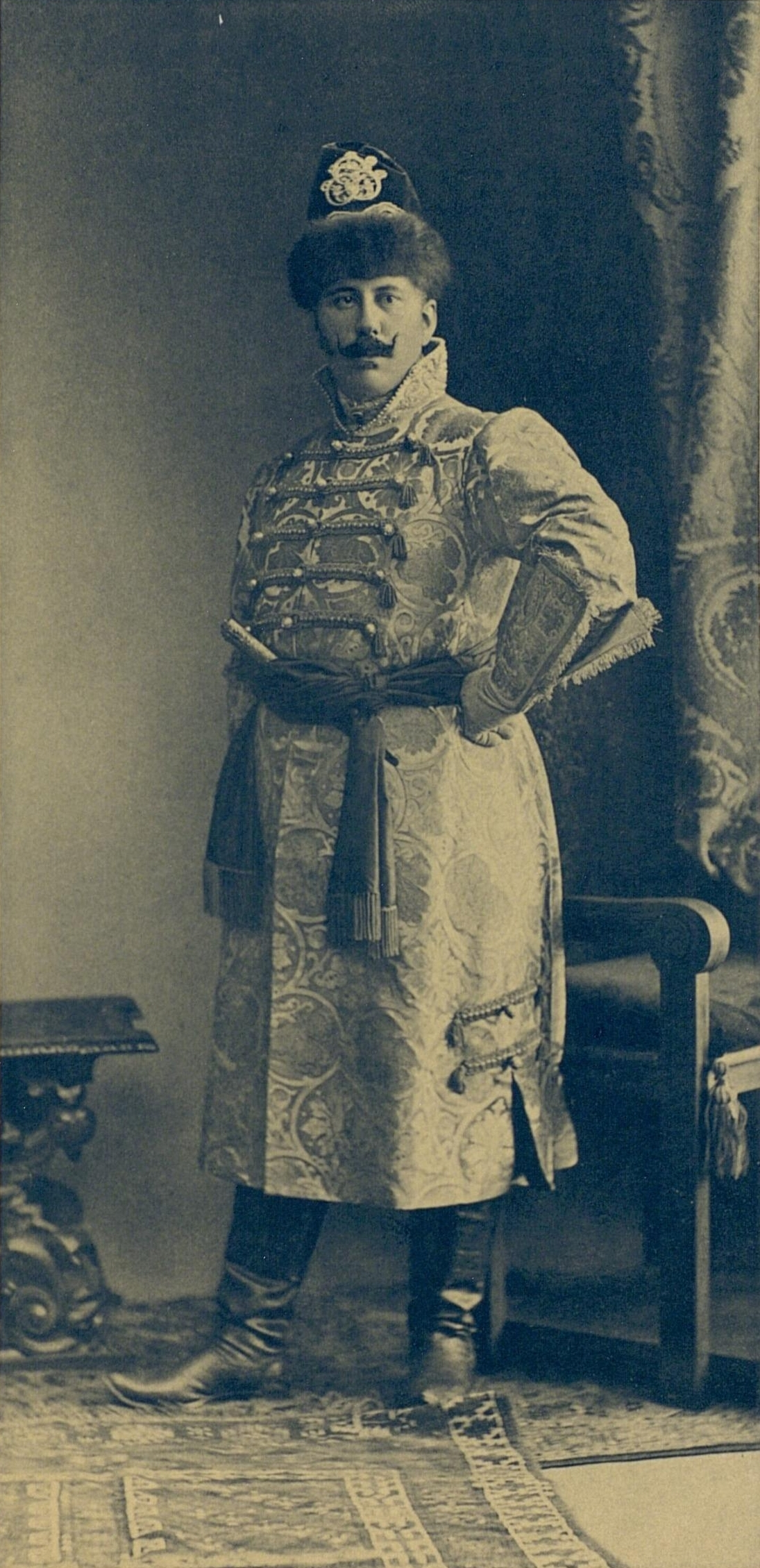
- Prince Orlov dressed for the 1903 ball in the Winter Palace
- Born: Prince Vladimir Nikolayevich Orlov; 31 December 1868; Brussels, Belgium
- Died: 29 August 1927 (aged 58); Samois-sur-Seine, France
- Noble family: Orlov
- Spouse: Olga Konstantinova Beloselskaya-Belozerskaya
- Issue: Nikolai Vladimirovich Orlov
- Father: Prince Nikolay Alexeyevich Orlov
- Mother: Princess Ekaterina Nikolaevna Trubetskaya

Prince Vladimir Nikolayevich Orlov (31 December 1868 – 29 August 1927), part of the Orlov family, was one of Tsar Nicholas II's closest advisors, and between 1906 and 1915 headed the Tsar's military cabinet.

== Biography ==
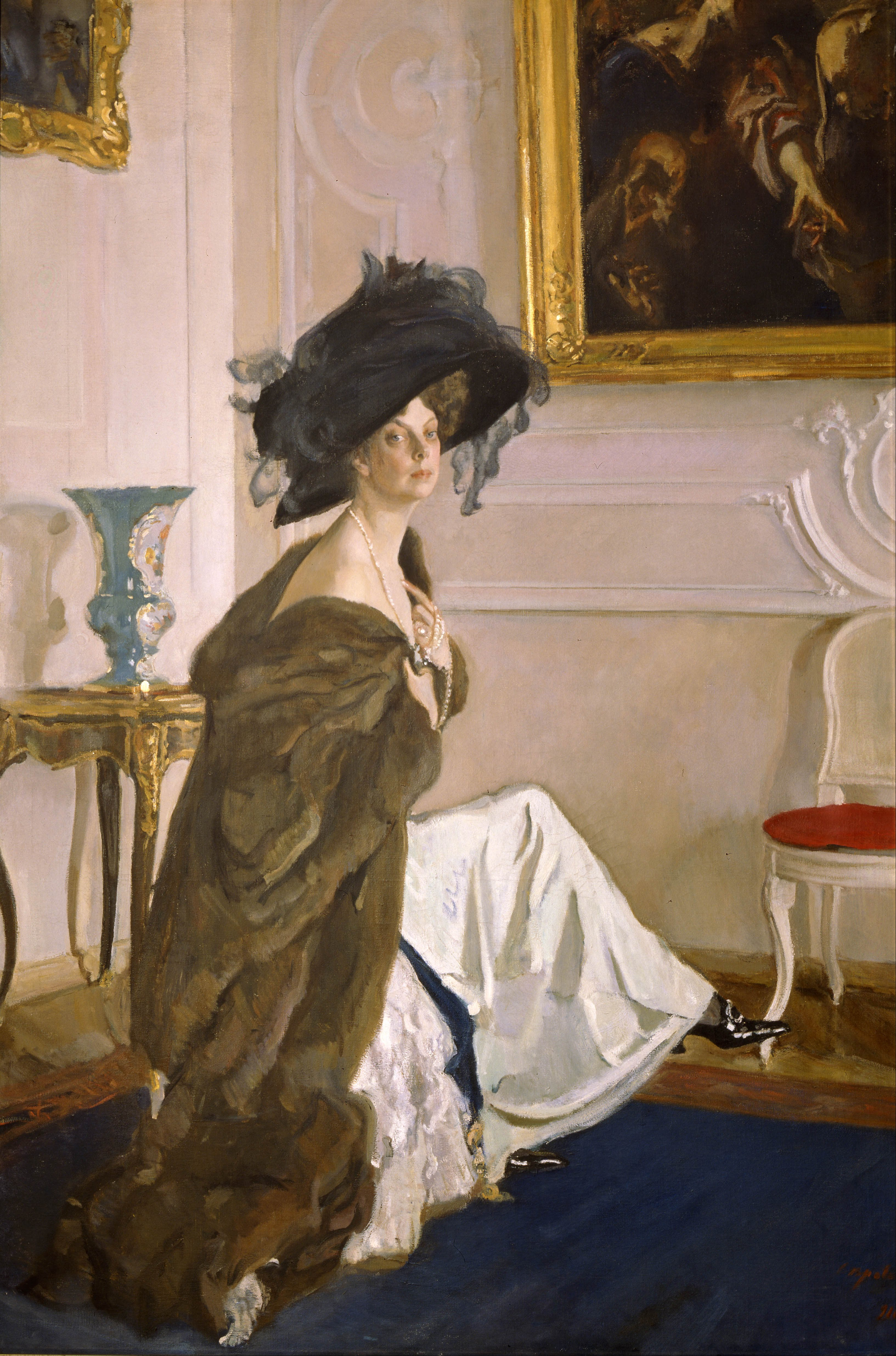
1911 portrait of Olga Orlov by Valentin Serov.

Orlov, who bore the nickname "Fat Orlov", may have introduced to the Tsar the motorcar in 1903, and was married to Olga, a daughter of Prince Constantine Esperovich Beloselsky-Belozersky. His son Prince Nicholas Vladimirovich Orlov (1891–1961) wed in 1917 Nadezhda Petrovna Romanov Orloff. Orlov competed in the 1900 Summer Olympics, in equestrian events.

=== Patron of engineers ===
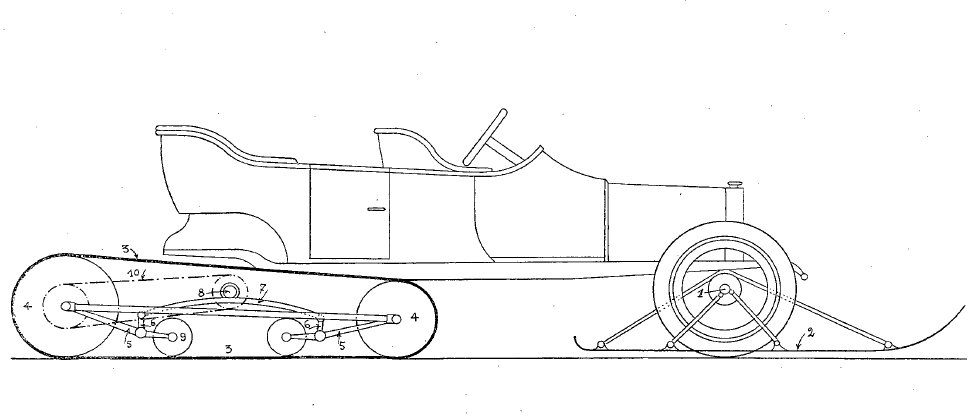
Drawing from the 1913 patent of the Kégresse half-track.

As the head of the military cabinet, Orlov was a keen technologist interested in military applications of the motor car. He was the patron of Adolphe Kégresse, the brilliant mechanical engineer responsible for the Kégresse track. Orlov wrote in a letter to the Tsar on 15 May 1914:

... I consider Kegress an irreplaceable worker and I am afraid his leaving will be a great loss for the garage. Your Highness knows, of course, how much His Majesty appreciates Kegress.

Indeed, Kégresse continued as Head of the Mechanical Department of the Russian Imperial Garage at Tsarskoye Selo until the fall of the Romanovs caused him to flee to his homeland.

=== Fall over Rasputin ===
Orlov continued his military duties until he was banished by the Tsar in 1915 to the Caucasus after losing the struggle for power to Rasputin. On August 19, 1915, after an unsuccessful attempt to discredit Rasputin and the Tsarina in a newspaper he and Vladimir Dzhunkovsky, First Deputy Interior Minister, were discharged from their posts, and four days later, the Tsar took supreme command of the Russian armies fighting on the Eastern Front of the First World War. As The Times correspondent Robert Wilton put it,

The loathsome Rasputin played no small part in suggesting the Tsar’s mystical motives for taking up the High Command. Rasputin always works in the same way. He tells the Empress that he had a vision that certain things must be done, the Empress then retails this stuff to her husband and the trick is done. It reminds one of the Byzantine Court.

=== In exile ===
Orlov, exiled by events subsequent to the Russian Revolution of 1917 and settled in Paris. Orlov died in Samois-sur-Seine and is buried in Paris, France.
