= Strelna =

Settlement in Petrodvortsovy District, Russia

Strelna Стрельна
- Municipal settlement
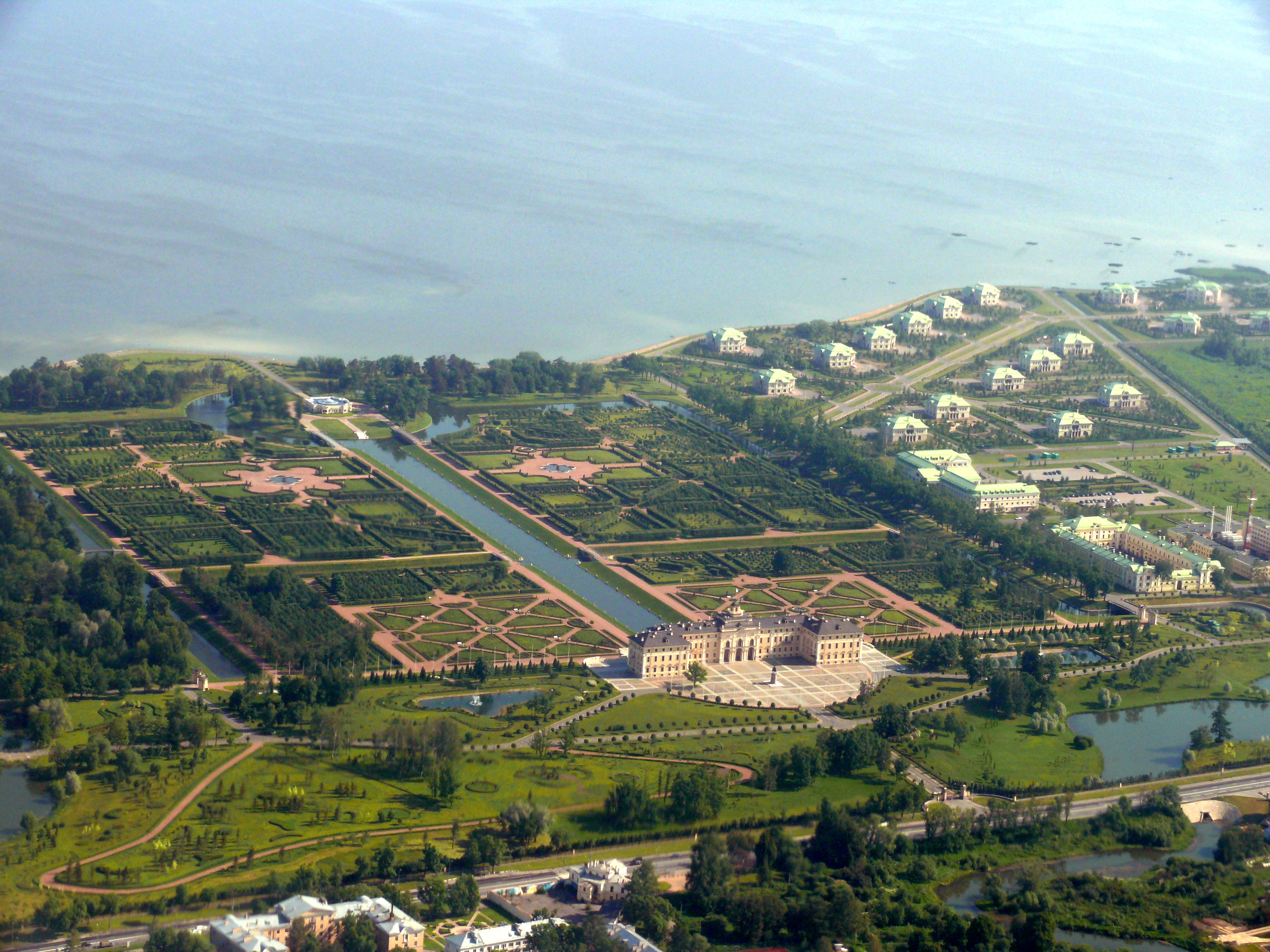
- Palace of Congresses State Complex in Strelna

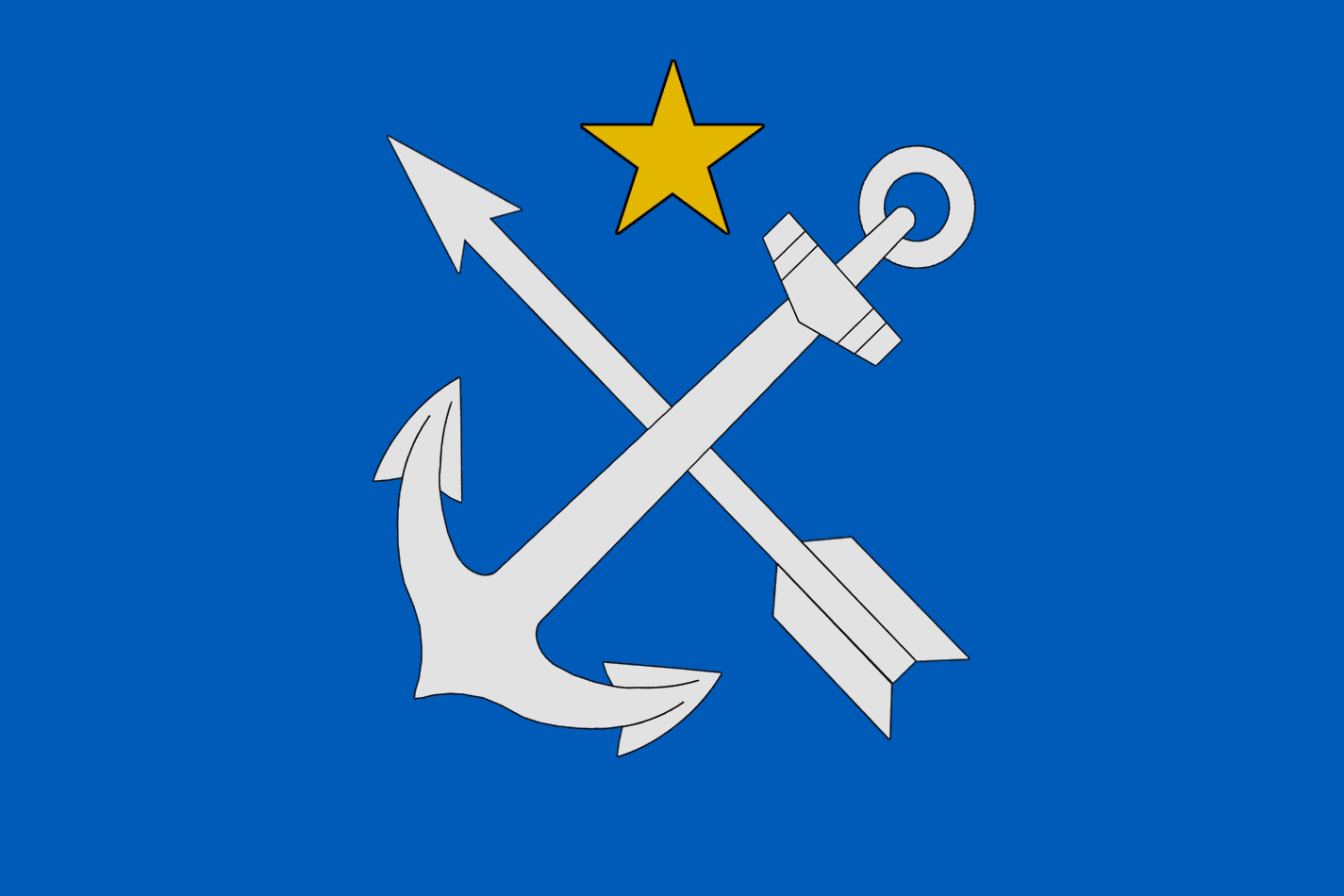
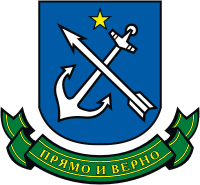
- Flag Coat of arms
- Interactive map of Strelna
- Location of Strelna Strelna (European Russia) Strelna (Russia)
- Coordinates: 59°51′13″N 30°3′35″E
- Country: Russia
- Federal subject: Saint Petersburg
- Administrative district: Petrodvortsovy District

Population
  - Estimate (2023): 14,359 )
- Time zone: UTC+
- Postal code: 198515
- OKTMO ID: 40396000

Strelna (Russian: Стре́льна, IPA: [ˈstrʲelʲnə]) is a municipal settlement in Petrodvortsovy District of the federal city of Saint Petersburg, Russia, about halfway between Saint Petersburg proper and Petergof, and overlooking the shore of the Gulf of Finland. Population: 12,452 (2010 census); 12,751 (2002 census).

== History ==
Strelna was first mentioned in Cadastral surveying of Vodskaya pyatina in 1500, as the village of Strelna on Retse Strelne on the Sea in the churchyard Kipen Koporsky County. After Treaty of Stolbovo these lands were part of Sweden, and in 1630 in Strelna appears as a baronial estate of Swedish politician Johan Skytte.

== Palace of Peter the Great ==
In 1718, a temporary wooden palace was constructed in Strelna. It had been used by the Russian royalty as a sort of hunting lodge, and has been preserved to this day. A cornerstone was laid in June 1720, but next year it became apparent that the place was ill-adapted for installation of fountains, thus Peter decided to concentrate his attention on the nearby Peterhof. Italian architect Nicola Michetti left Strelna, and all works were suspended.

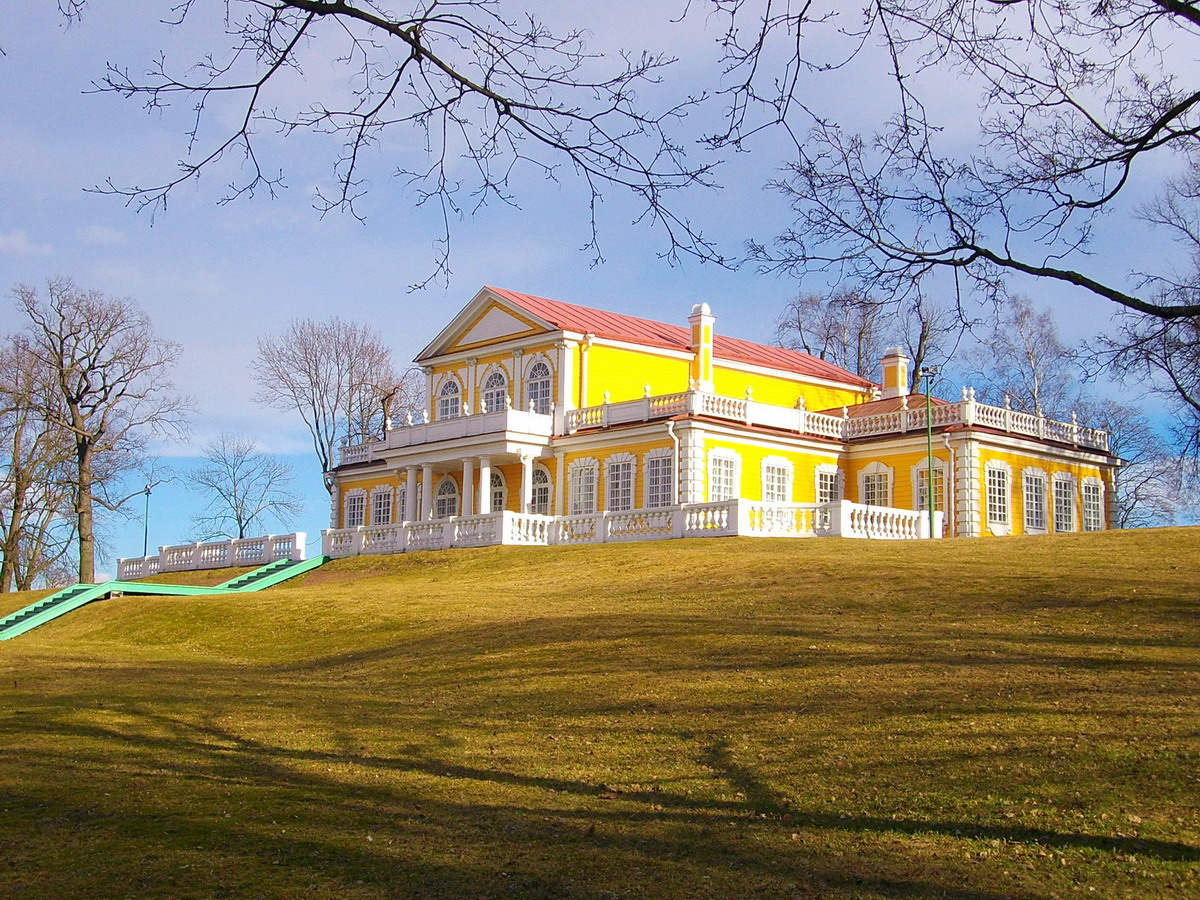
Palace of Peter the Great

On ascending the throne in 1741, Peter's daughter Elizabeth intended to complete her father's project. Her favourite architect Bartolomeo Rastrelli was asked to expand and aggrandize Michetti's design. But Rastrelli's attention was soon diverted to other palaces, in Peterhof and Tsarskoye Selo, so the Strelna palace stood unfinished until the end of the century.

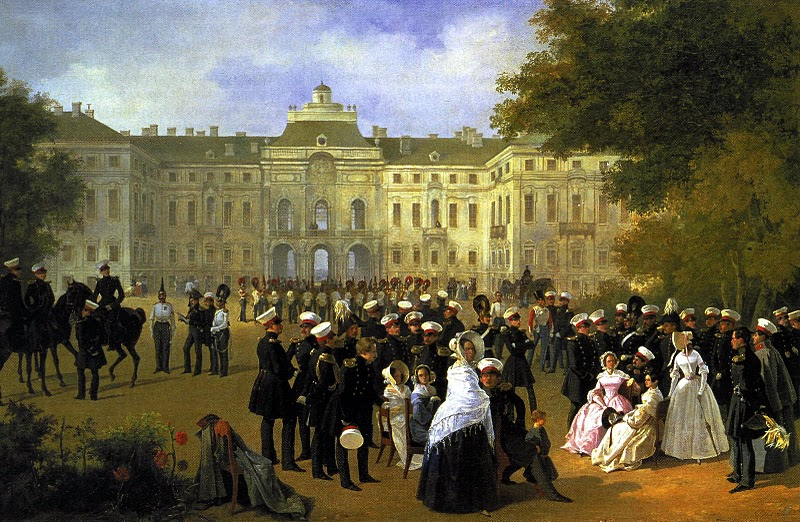
Leib Guard reception at the Konstantin Palace. A 19th-century painting.

== Family home of the Konstantinovichi branch of the Romanovs ==
In 1797, Strelna was granted to Grand Duke Konstantin Pavlovich (second son of Paul I) and his wife Grand Duchess Anna Feodorovna (aunt of Queen Victoria). Despite a great fire in 1803, the Constantine Palace was completed by 1807. After Konstantin's death, the palace passed to his nephew, and the Konstantinovichi branch of the Romanov dynasty retained its ownership until the Revolution.

== Vicissitudes in the 20th and 21st century ==
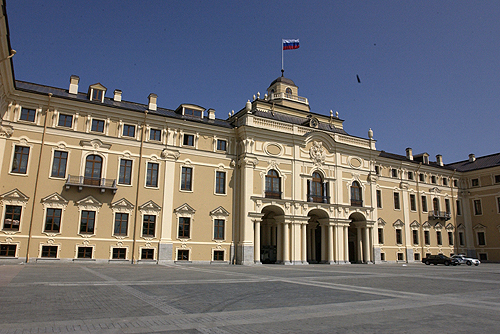
The Konstantin Palace after renovation during the 300th anniversary of Saint Petersburg

After 1917 the palace fell into decay: it was handed over to a child working commune, then to a secondary school. For a period during World War II, the Germans occupied Strelna and had a naval base there. Some Decima Flottiglia MAS men and attack boats were brought from Italy and based at Strelna along with German Army boats. Strelna Raid: Soviet commando frogmen attacked that base and destroyed 2 German army boats on 5 October 1943.

After the ravages of German occupation, only the palace walls were left standing; all interior decoration was gone. No effective restoration had been undertaken until 2001 when Vladimir Putin ordered the palace to be converted into a presidential residence for Saint Petersburg.

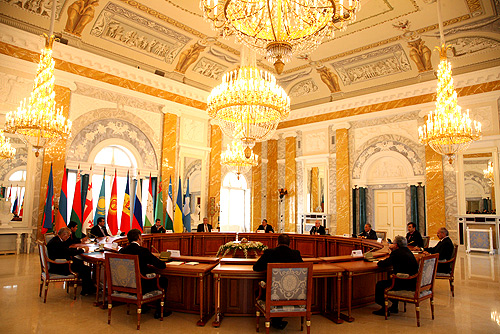
Recreated neoclassical interiors housed the CIS Summit, June 2008

In preparation for the celebration of the 300th anniversary of the founding Saint Petersburg, the Russian government decided to restore the palace and its grounds as a state conference center and presidential residence. The general contractor of the reconstruction was the consortium "16th Trust and Partners". Setl Group construction company, headed by Maxim Shubarev, also participated in the renovation works.

The renovated Konstantin Palace hosted more than 50 heads of state during the Saint Petersburg tercentenary celebrations in 2003. Three years later, on 15–17 July 2006, it hosted the 32nd G8 summit. During these summits, the world leaders were accommodated in 18 luxurious cottages by the sea-side. Each of the cottages is named after a historic Russian town. The early 19th-century stables were reconstructed into a four-star hotel for other visitors. The 2013 G20 summit was held at the palace 5–6 September 2013. The palace also held the qualifying draw for the 2018 FIFA World Cup, which took place in Russia. The palace hosted in 2021 the royal wedding between Grand Duke George Romanov and Victoria Bettarini, this been the first royal wedding to be held in the country in over a hundred years.

== Other landmarks ==
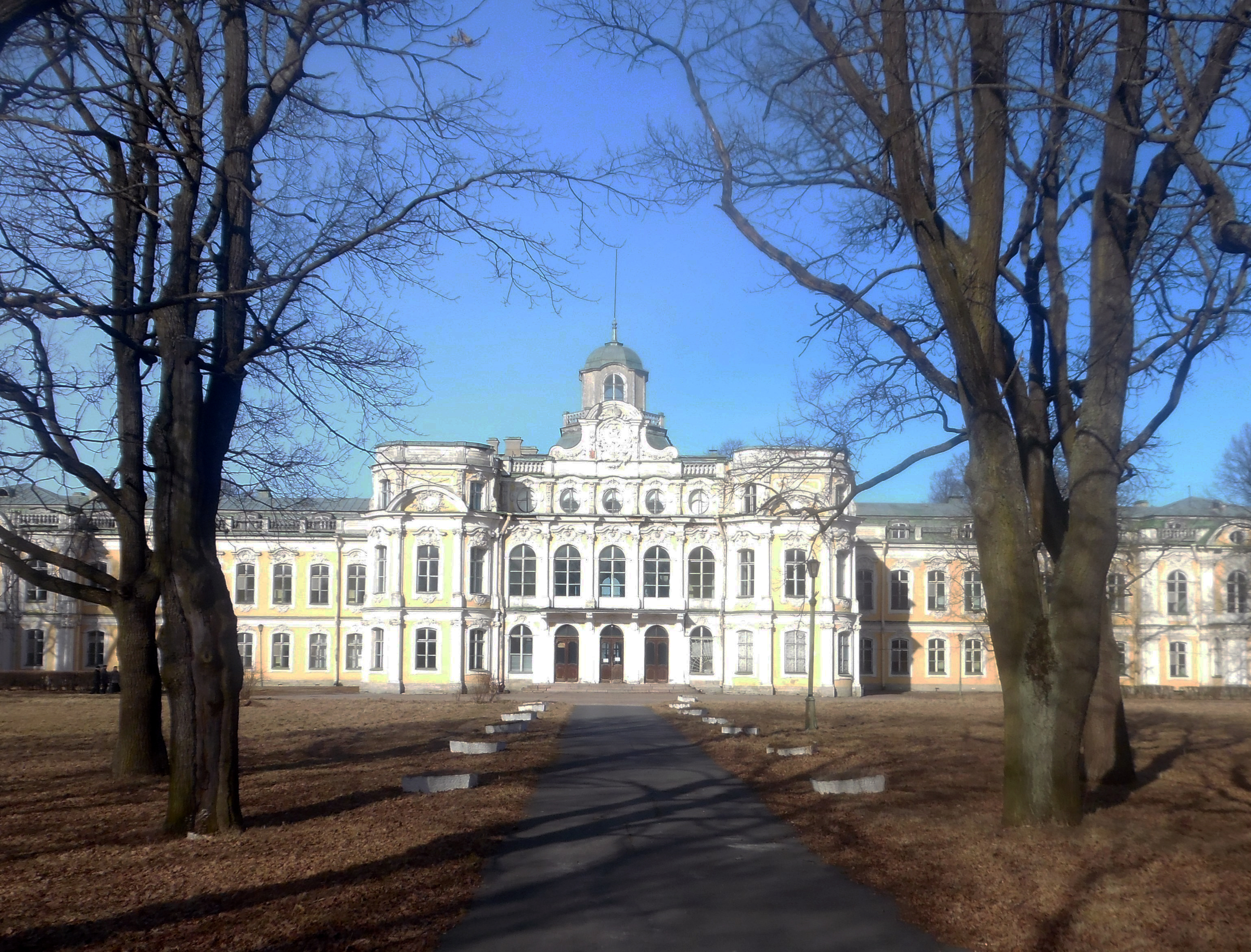
Znamenka Palace, March 2015

Several other Romanov residences may be seen in the vicinity of the Konstantin Palace. The Znamenka Palace, possibly designed in 1770–1760's by Rastrelli, was acquired by Nicholas I for his spouse Maria Alexandrovna in 1835, used to be a home to the Nikolaevichi branch of the Romanovs.

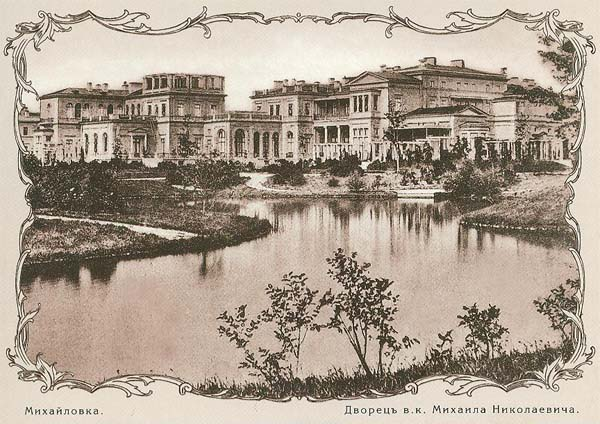
Mikhailovka c. 1910

The neoclassical Mikhailovka estate and palace belonged from 1834 to Grand Duke Michael Nikolaevich and the Mikhailovichi branch of the family. The buildings designed in 1850 by Andrei Stackenschneider and between 1858 and 1861 by Iosif Iosifovich Charlemagne and Harald von Bosse, are presently mostly dilapidated and nearly in ruins. In 2006 the Saint Petersburg State University had plans to renovate the area for a campus between 2006 and 2009.

Other landmarks in Strelna include a seaside dacha of Mathilde Kschessinska near Konstantin Palace (demolished in late 1950's) and the ruined Maritime Monastery of St. Sergius, with numerous churches by Luigi Rusca. The monastery is noted as a burial place of the Zubov brothers and other Russian nobles. The imperial foreign minister Alexander Gorchakov was interred here in 1883.

The Konstantin Palace, the Trinity Monastery, Mikhailovka, and Znamenka are parts of the World Heritage Site Saint Petersburg and Related Groups of Monuments.

== See also ==
- List of Baroque residences
