= Attempts to rescue Nicholas II of Russia and his family =

Series of diplomatic, political, and clandestine initiatives

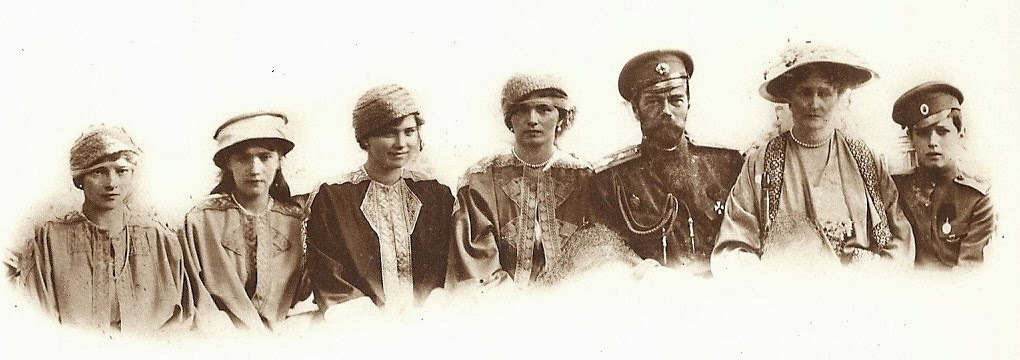
The family of Nicholas II of Russia in 1916. From left to right: Tatiana, Anastasia, Maria, Olga, Nicholas, Alexandra, and Alexei.

The attempts to rescue Nicholas II of Russia and his family were a series of diplomatic, political, and clandestine initiatives aimed at removing the last Russian emperor, his wife, and their children from Russian territory following the February Revolution of 1917 and the subsequent Bolshevik rise to power. These initiatives were undertaken between 1917 and 1918 by various countries, including Great Britain, France, the German Empire, and Spain, as well as Russian monarchist groups associated with the White movement.

== Background ==
In March 1917, amid the February Revolution and growing political and social instability in the Russian Empire, Nicholas II was compelled to abdicate the throne. Following his abdication, the deposed emperor, his wife, Alexandra Feodorovna, and their children, Olga, Tatiana, Maria, Anastasia, and Alexei, were placed under house arrest at the Alexander Palace in Tsarskoye Selo by order of the Russian Provisional Government. Initially, they remained under the supervision of the Provisional Government, then led by Alexander Kerensky, while possible arrangements for their exile abroad were discussed.

== Rescue attempts ==
=== Great Britain ===
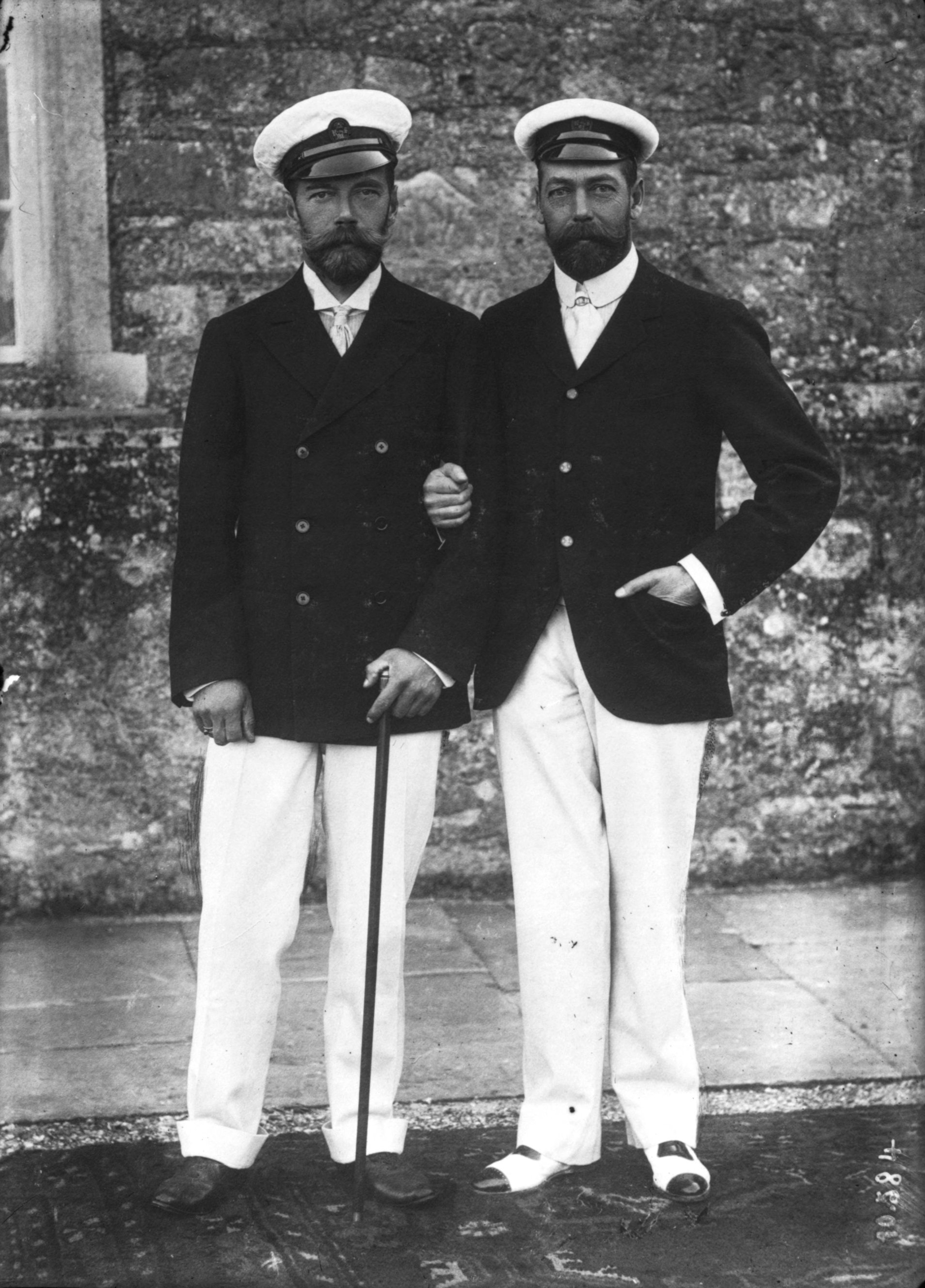
Nicholas II and George V in 1910, during a visit by the Russian imperial family to England.

Great Britain was the most obvious initial destination for Nicholas and his family to seek asylum. King George V was a first cousin of both Alexandra and Nicholas, with whom he had maintained a close personal relationship since childhood.

In March 1917, the Russian Provisional Government expressed interest in transferring the former emperor and his family to England. The British ambassador to Petrograd, George Buchanan, participated in the diplomatic communications concerning the proposal.

The proposal, however, was reconsidered in the following weeks. By April 1917, George V had begun expressing concern about the potential political repercussions of the Romanovs' arrival in Britain. Among the factors considered were the growing strength of socialist and anti-monarchist sentiment in Britain, the unpopularity of the Russian autocratic monarchy following years of repression, and Alexandra Feodorovna's German origins (she had been born Princess Alix of Hesse and by Rhine), which were particularly unpopular during World War I.

On April 6, 1917, the King's private secretary informed the government that George V believed the arrival of the deposed Russian emperor would encounter strong opposition from British public opinion. In light of these concerns, the offer of asylum was withdrawn, preventing the family from settling in Britain.

=== France ===
The French Republic was also considered as a possible destination for the Romanovs' exile. During World War I, France was one of the Russian Empire's principal allies. The Franco-Russian Alliance, established decades before 1917 under Nicholas's father, Emperor Alexander III, had been fundamental to the foreign policies of both countries.

Nevertheless, the French government opposed granting asylum to the Romanovs from the outset. In addition to Nicholas's wife's German origins, which led to suspicions that she was pro-German during the war, the French government had to take into account its relationship with the new republican Russian Provisional Government and preserve military cooperation between the two countries.

French opposition was not limited to Nicholas II and his immediate family. France also refused entry to other relatives of the deposed emperor, including members of the Romanov grand ducal family.

=== Germany ===
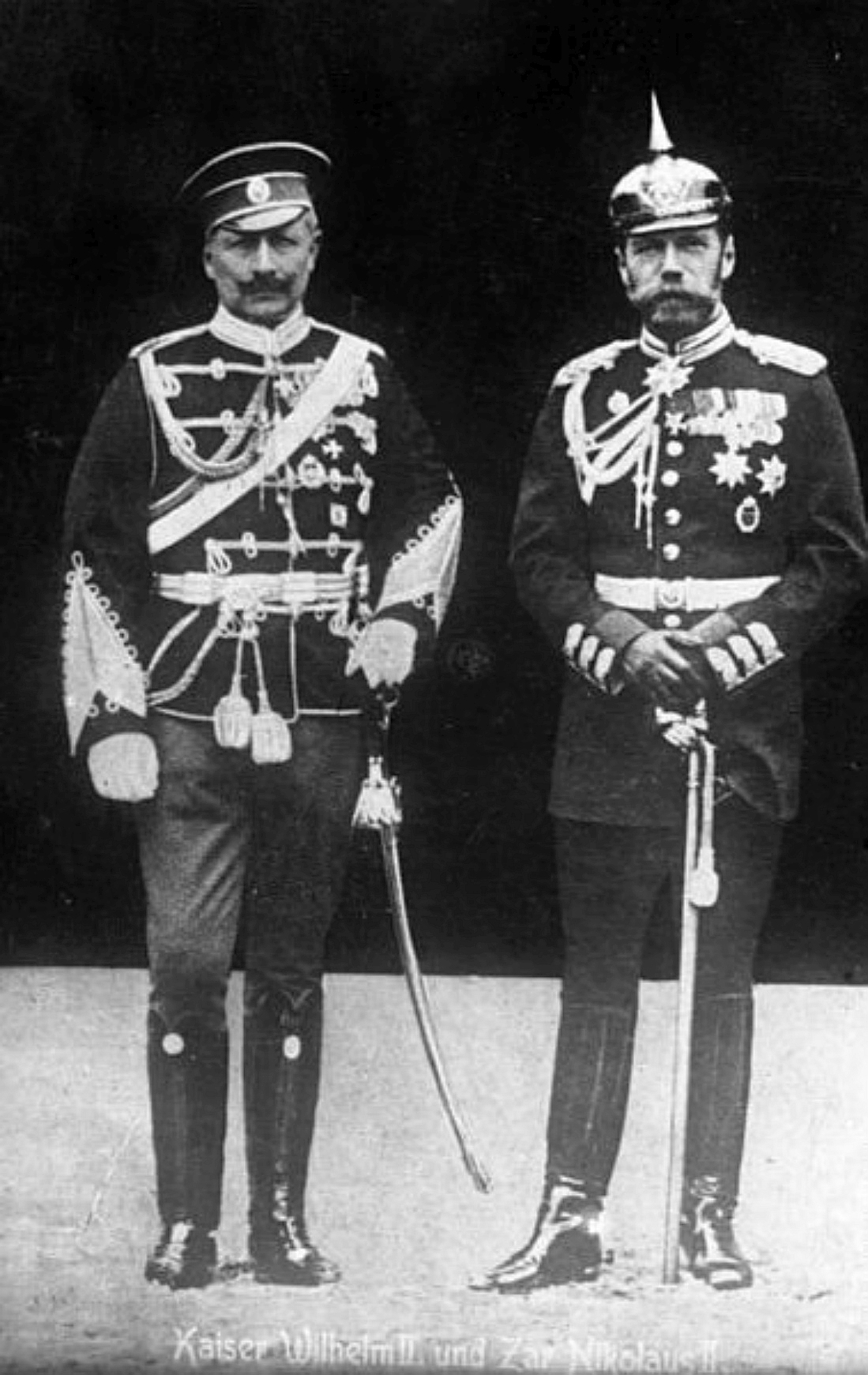
Wilhelm II and Nicholas II in 1905, wearing each other's Russian and German military uniforms, respectively.

The German Empire, despite being at war with Russia, also attempted to find a way to save Nicholas and his family. German Emperor Wilhelm II was a first cousin of Alexandra and a second cousin of Nicholas, with whom he maintained a relationship that experienced considerable ups and downs over the years.

As one of the few powers that still possessed sufficient military and diplomatic influence in 1918 to attempt to exert pressure on the Bolshevik government, Germany considered various alternatives for removing the imperial family from Russia. According to German Chancellor Theobald von Bethmann-Hollweg, the possibility of contacting the Russian Provisional Government through neutral channels was discussed. Wilhelm II later stated that he had been willing to arrange a military safe-conduct, provided that Russian authorization could be obtained.

However, Nicholas and Alexandra rejected the possibility of leaving Russia with German assistance, as they regarded Wilhelm II as a traitor. Alexandra, herself born a German princess, reportedly declared: "I would rather die than be rescued by the Germans."

=== Spain ===
King Alfonso XIII of Spain also expressed interest in the situation of Nicholas and his family following the Russian Revolution. The monarch, who was married to Victoria Eugenie of Battenberg, a first cousin of Alexandra, took advantage of Spain's neutrality and its dynastic and diplomatic connections to monitor the fate of the Romanovs and seek alternatives for their release.

In 1918, after returning from the French war front, British King George V sent a letter to Alfonso XIII requesting that the Spanish monarch use his country's neutrality to attempt to secure the release of Nicholas and his family. The Dowager Queen of Greece, Olga Constantinovna, herself a Romanov grand duchess who was also being held captive in Russia at Pavlovsk Palace during the Revolution, sent a message to Alfonso XIII requesting assistance for Nicholas and his family. The message emphasized the urgency of the situation and warned that little hope remained without immediate intervention.

In August 1918, Alfonso XIII proposed transferring Nicholas and his family to a neutral territory, where they would remain under his protection until the end of the war. Subsequently, in September of that year, Spanish diplomat Fernando Gómez Contreras was sent to Moscow to negotiate directly with the Bolshevik leadership over the possibility of evacuating the Romanovs. However, owing to the scarcity of information about Nicholas and his family's fate during the Russian Civil War, by the time these initiatives were undertaken, Nicholas, Alexandra, their children, and other members of their entourage had already been executed in Yekaterinburg in July 1918.

=== Clandestine attempts by Russian monarchists ===
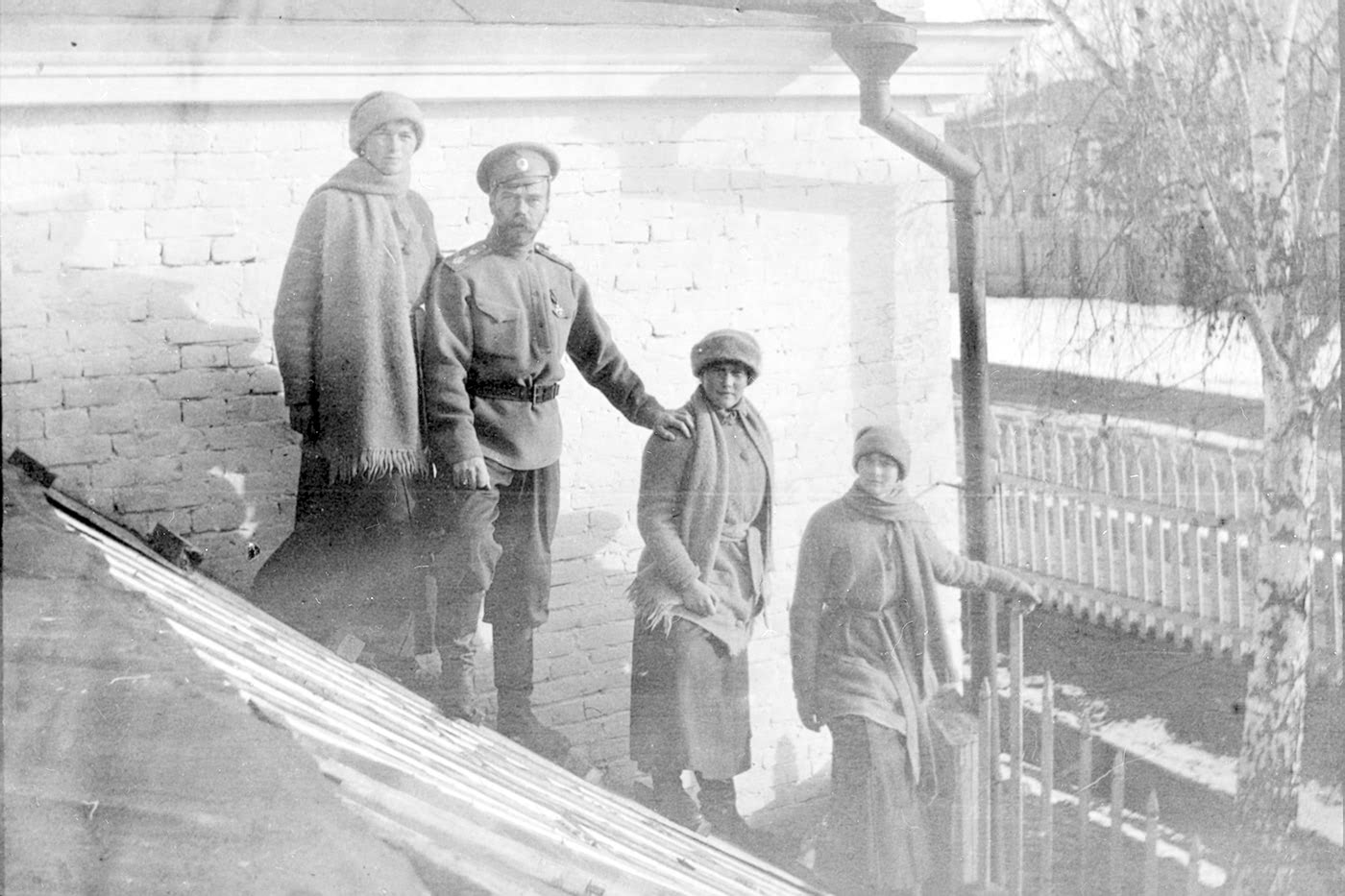
The deposed Russian Emperor Nicholas II with his daughters Olga, Anastasia, and Tatiana, photographed during the family's captivity in Tobolsk, Siberia, in the winter of 1917–1918.

In addition to foreign diplomatic initiatives, plans for the family's liberation were also developed by Russian monarchists and supporters of the Romanovs.

While the family was held in Tobolsk, former imperial officers and individuals connected to the former tsarist administration established contacts to organize a possible escape. The city's location, far from the main political centers, nevertheless presented considerable logistical difficulties for any rescue attempt.

The plans envisaged removing the prisoners from the residence where they were confined and transporting them to regions controlled by anti-Bolshevik forces. However, there is no evidence that any of these initiatives progressed to an operational stage that could have resulted in the family's liberation.

== Outcome and consequences ==
Following successive failed rescue attempts, the fall of the Provisional Government, and the Bolshevik rise to power, the Romanovs were eventually transferred to Yekaterinburg, where Nicholas and his family were confined in the Ipatiev House under increasingly strict surveillance and restrictions. As anti-Bolshevik forces advanced toward the city, the possibility of the imperial family's liberation became a concern for the local authorities. During the night of July 16–17, 1918, Nicholas, his wife, their five children, and other members of their entourage were murdered in the Ipatiev House.

The murder of the Russian imperial family had international repercussions, particularly among the nations that had refused to provide them with asylum. Under George V, Britain subsequently demonstrated a greater willingness to protect members of threatened reigning families. During the collapse of the Austro-Hungarian monarchy, the King intervened on behalf of the deposed Emperor Charles I and his family, declaring: "We shall do at once whatever is necessary." Orders were subsequently given to the British War Office to organize the immediate evacuation of the Habsburgs from republican Austria. George V also dispatched the British battleship HMS Marlborough to Yalta, in Crimea, to rescue surviving members of the Romanov family, including Nicholas's mother and George V's maternal aunt, Dowager Empress Maria Feodorovna. France, meanwhile, which had once refused to accept any Romanovs, subsequently became one of the principal destinations for surviving members of the dynasty and Russian exiles, establishing itself as an important center of White Russian emigration.

== In popular culture ==
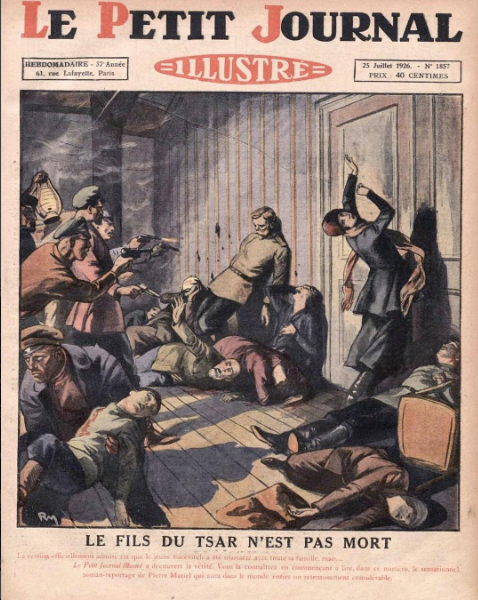
"The Tsar's Son Is Not Dead" (French: Le Fils du Tsar N'est Pas mort). Cover of Le Petit Journal Illustré announcing a fictional report by Pierre Mariel, presented as a revelation concerning the supposed survival of Tsarevich Alexei following the massacre of the Russian imperial family by the Bolsheviks.

In popular culture, the possibility that members of Nicholas II's family escaped execution by the Bolsheviks in 1918 has been explored in works of alternate history and historical fantasy. These narratives often examine both hypothetical rescue attempts in Yekaterinburg and scenarios in which certain members of the family survive in secrecy, particularly Grand Duchess Anastasia and Tsarevich Alexei.

The novel Romanov (2019), by Nadine Brandes, reimagines the family's captivity, depicting Anastasia using magic to protect her relatives and organize an escape. Meanwhile, The Last Romanov (2012), by Dora Levy Mossanen, explores the possibility that Tsarevich Alexei survived and features a fictional lady-in-waiting with mystical abilities who escapes the massacre. In 2018, The Romanoffs, a television series produced by Amazon Prime Video, premiered, depicting people who believe themselves to be descendants or survivors of the Russian imperial family.

In cinema, the film Anastasia (1956), inspired by the case of Anna Anderson, who claimed to be Grand Duchess Anastasia, leaves open the possibility that she survived. The animated musical film Anastasia (1997), meanwhile, presents a fictional version in which the princess and her grandmother, Dowager Empress Maria Feodorovna, escape the attack on the palace through a secret passage with the assistance of a young servant. The production was subsequently adapted into a Broadway musical, which premiered in 2017.

== Bibliography ==
- King, Greg; Wilson, Penny (2006). Gilded Prism: The Konstantinovichi Grand Dukes and the Last Years of the Romanov Dynasty. Richmond Heights, California: Eurohistory. ISBN 0-9771961-4-3..
- Massie, Robert K. (1995). The Fate of the Romanovs: The Final Chapter. Random House. ISBN 978-0-3945-8048-7..
- Mednikov, IY. (2011). "Rescue Mission: Alfonso XIII and the Russian Imperial Family". RUDN Journal of World History (in Russian) (1): 65–75. ISSN 2312-8127..
- Pérez de Arcos, Marina (2022). "'Finding Out Whereabouts of Missing Persons': The European War Office, Transnational Humanitarianism and Spanish Royal Diplomacy in the First World War". The International History Review. 44 (3): 497–523. doi:10.1080/07075332.2021.1976809..
- Rappaport, Helen (2018). The Race to Save the Romanovs: The Truth Behind the Secret Plans to Rescue Russia's Imperial Family (digital). St. Martin's Press. ISBN 9781250151230..
- Rappaport, Helen (2022). After the Romanovs: Russian Exiles in Paris from the Belle Époque Through Revolution and War. Scribe. ISBN 9781914484766..
