= Znamenka Palace =

Former imperial palace near Saint Petersburg Russia

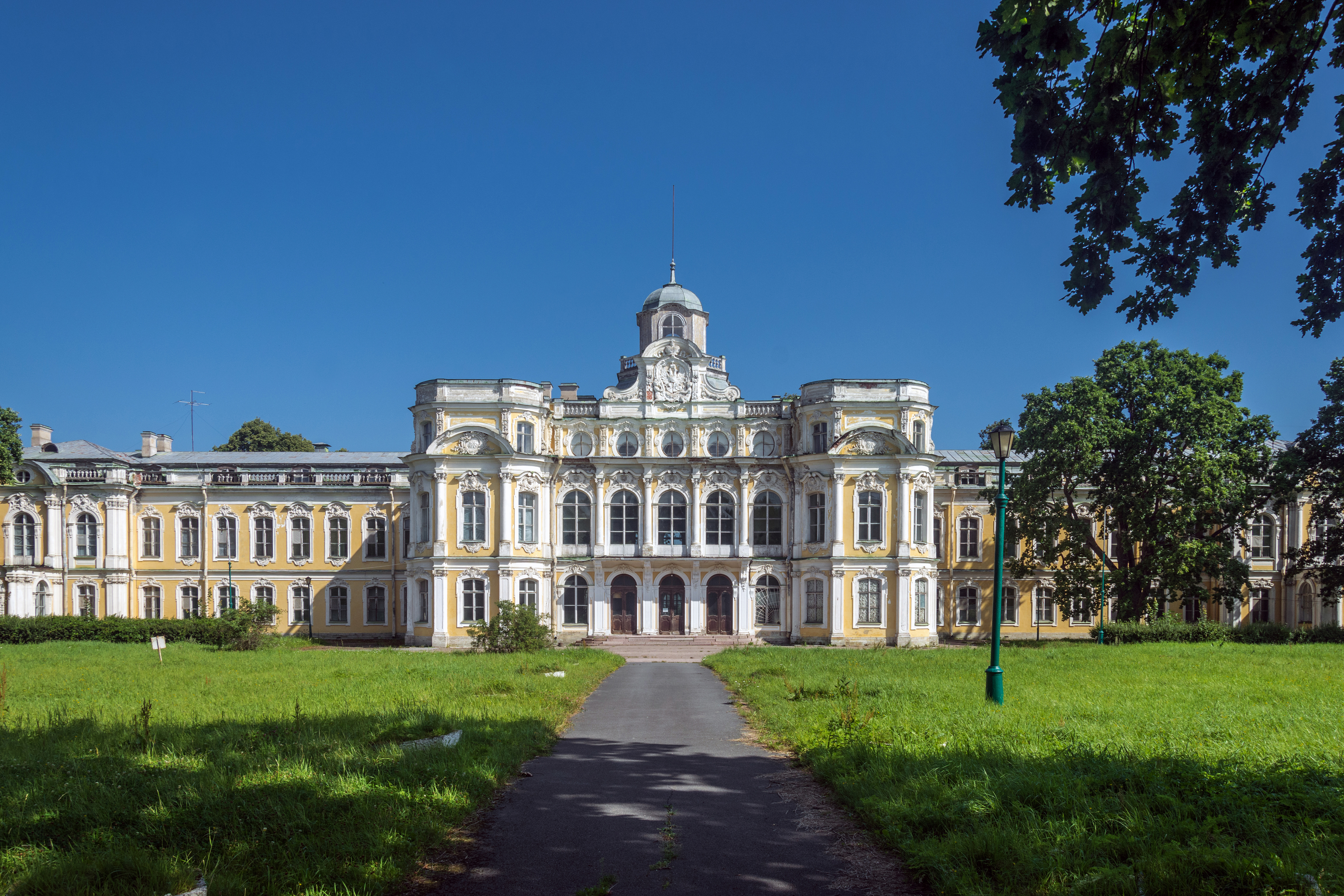
- Main building of Znamenka Palace

General information
- Country: Russia
- Coordinates: 59°52′37″N 29°57′53″E

The Znamenka Palace (Russian: Знаменка, or Знаменский дворец) is a former imperial Russian palace located in the Petrodvortsovy District of Saint Petersburg, Russia. It is close to the more famous former imperial summer residence of Peterhof Palace, which is to the east of Znamenka. Znamenka is surrounded by a vast park and includes a church, stables, and kitchen buildings.

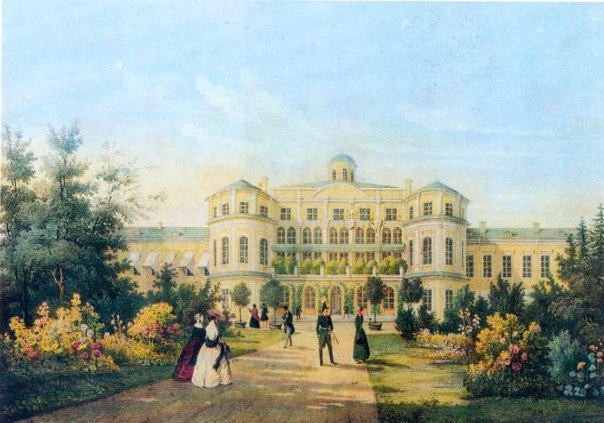
Znamenka Palace in 1845

== History of Znamenka ==
The first building to be called Znamenka was a manor house that existed in the 18th century and was owned by different noble families, who all expanded and redecorated the building.

In 1835 it became an imperial residence when Emperor Nicholas I of Russia bought the existing manor house as a gift to his wife, Empress Alexandrea Feodorovna. The current palace main structure was then rebuilt from the smaller manor house into a palace by the architect Andrei Stackenschneider.

Znamenka was given as a wedding gift in 1856 to the couple's third son, Grand Duke Nicholas Nikolaevich of Russia (1831–1891) and his new wife Duchess Alexandra of Oldenburg. It remained in the Nicholaivichi branch of the imperial family until the Russian Revolution in 1917. Grand Duke Nicholas Nikolaevich (the Elder) had the palace rebuilt in 1857-59. Its façades and interiors were styled in Russian Baroque to its current appearance by the architect Harald Julius von Bosse. He also built the richly decorated stables at Znamenka. Grand Duke Nicholas and Grand Duchess Alexandra used Znamenka as their summer residence and they often entertained guests there. Grand Duchess Alexandra, a gifted artist, adorned the walls of Znamenka with her paintings.

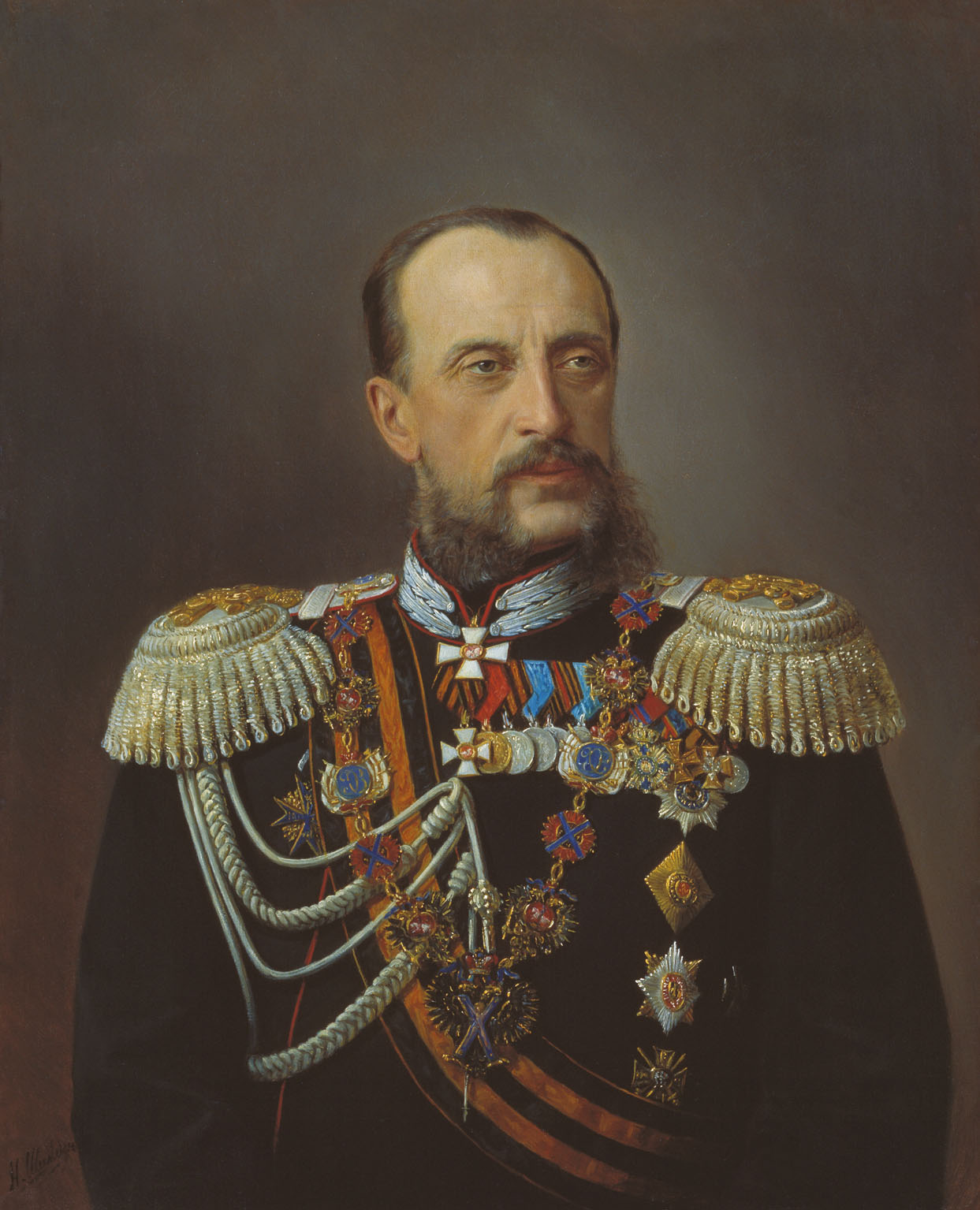
Grand Duke Nicholas Nikolaevich the Elder, owner of Znamenka from 1856 to 1891

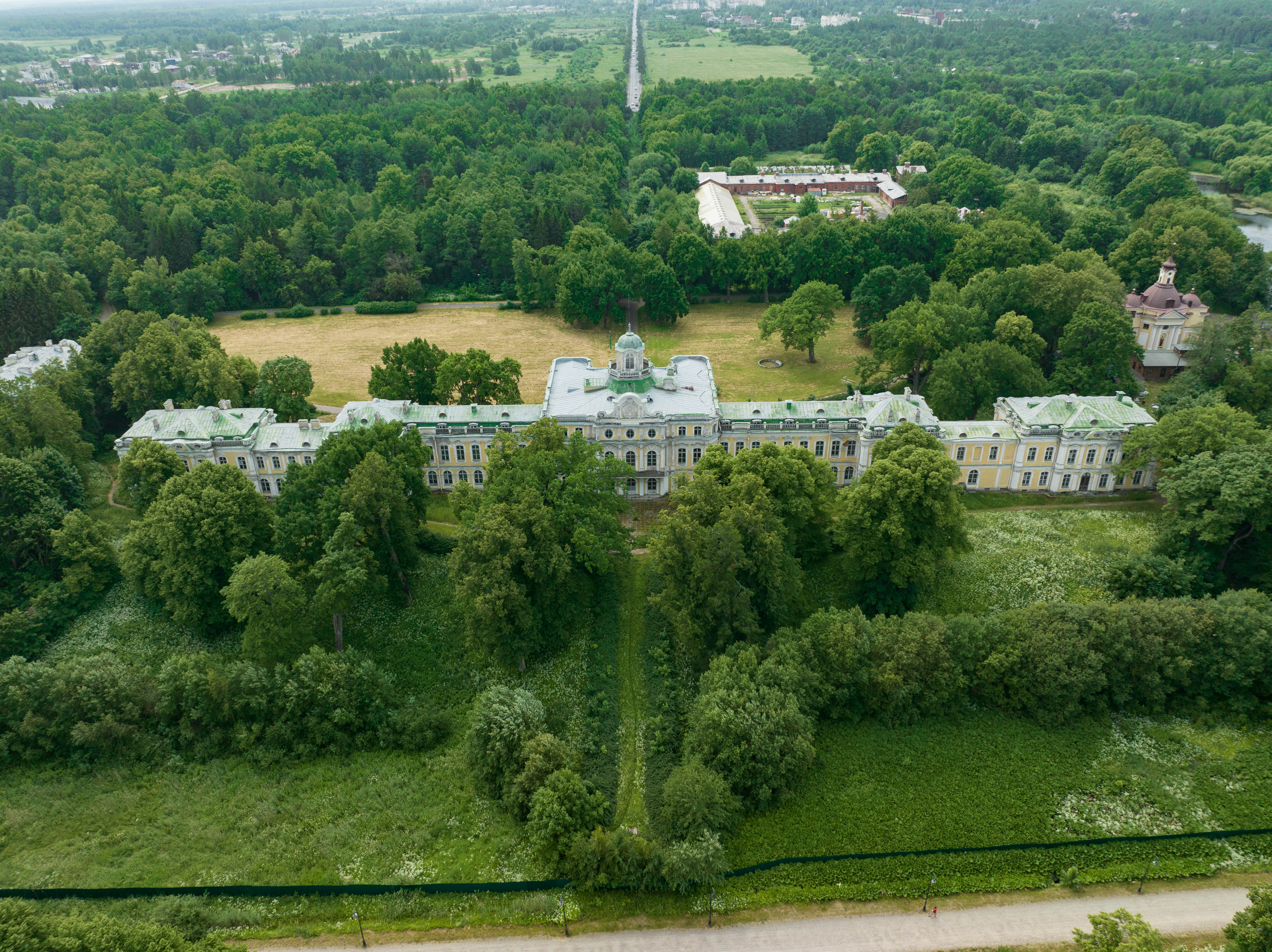
Back view of Znamenka Palace and park. Visible is the Church of St. Peter and Paul to the right of Znamenka.

The last imperial owner of the palace was Grand Duke Peter Nikolaevich of Russia, the second son of Grand Duke Nicholas Nicholaevich the Elder. Znamenka served as the main residence of Grand Duke Peter and his wife, Grand Duchess Militza Nikolaevna and their children from 1891 until the revolution in 1917.

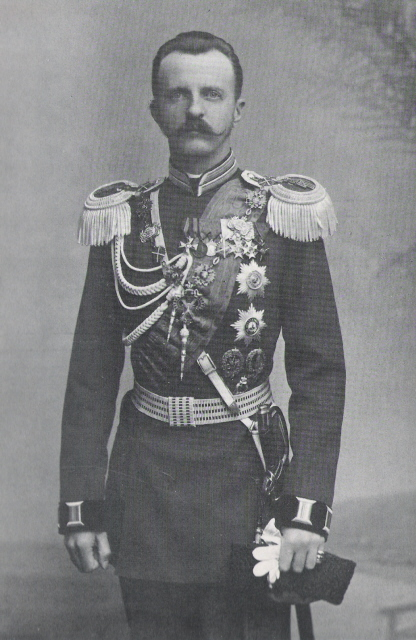
Grand Duke Peter, the last imperial owner of Znamenka Palace

After the Russian revolution the palace was nationalised.

The palace, the Peter and Paul Church, the stables, the kitchen building and the greenhouses have been preserved to this day, but the palace itself has not been in use since 2010.

Znamenka Palace is part of the World Heritage Site of Historic Centre of Saint Petersburg and Related Groups of Monuments.
