= Nicholas W. Orloff =

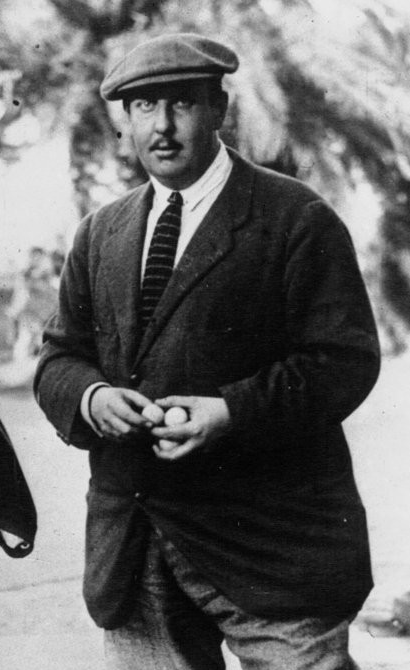
- Prince Orlov in 1921
- Born: Prince Nikolai Vladimirovich Orlov; 28 February 1895; Saint Petersburg, Russian Empire
- Died: 30 May 1961 (aged 66); Long Island, USA
- Noble family: Orlov
- Spouses: Princess Nadejda Petrovna of Russia; Marina Marshall
- Issue: Irina Nikolaevna Orlova; Xenia Nikolaevna Orlova
- Father: Prince Vladimir Nikolayevich Orlov
- Mother: Princess Olga Konstantinovna Beloselskaya-Belozerskaya
- Occupation: NKVD resident spy, United Nations translator

Nicholas W. Orloff (February 28, 1895 – May 30, 1961) was a Russian nobleman and a member of the House of Orlov.

== Biography ==
Born as the son of Prince Vladimir Nikolayevich Orlov, a Russian immigrant to the United States and an agent of the New York NKVD rezidentura during World War II. He had fought in World War I and the Russian Civil War, but abandoned the Whites and fled the country out of disgust over the White Terror.

According to historian John Earl Haynes and Harvey Klehr's analysis of the Venona Cables, Orloff received a regular stipend from the KGB for his services, reporting information on immigrant groups to Soviet intelligence and acting as a talent-spotter for new sources. He also appeared on the August 17, 1958, episode of What's My Line?, where he is credited as a "United Nations Interpreter."

The first wife of Nicholas Orloff was Princess Nadejda Petrovna of Russia.
