= Grand Duke Peter Nikolaevich of Russia =

Russian Grand Duke

Grand Duke Peter Nikolaevich
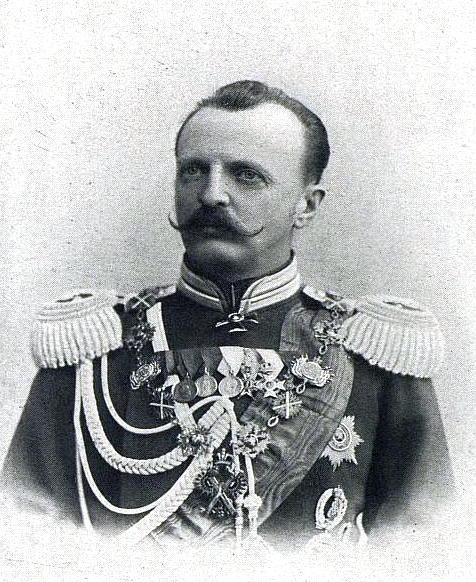
- Born: 22 January 1864; Saint Petersburg, Russian Empire
- Died: 17 June 1931 (aged 67); Antibes, France
- Spouse: Princess Milica of Montenegro (m. 1889)
- Issue: Princess Marina Petrovna; Prince Roman Petrovich; Princess Nadezhda Petrovna; Princess Sofia Petrovna
Names
- Peter Nikolaevich Romanov
- House: Holstein-Gottorp-Romanov
- Father: Grand Duke Nicholas Nikolaevich of Russia
- Mother: Duchess Alexandra of Oldenburg

Grand Duke Peter Nikolaevich of Russia (Russian: Пётр Никола́евич Рома́нов; 22 January [O.S. 10 January] 1864 – 17 June 1931) was a Russian Grand Duke and a member of the Russian Imperial Family.

== Early life and marriage ==
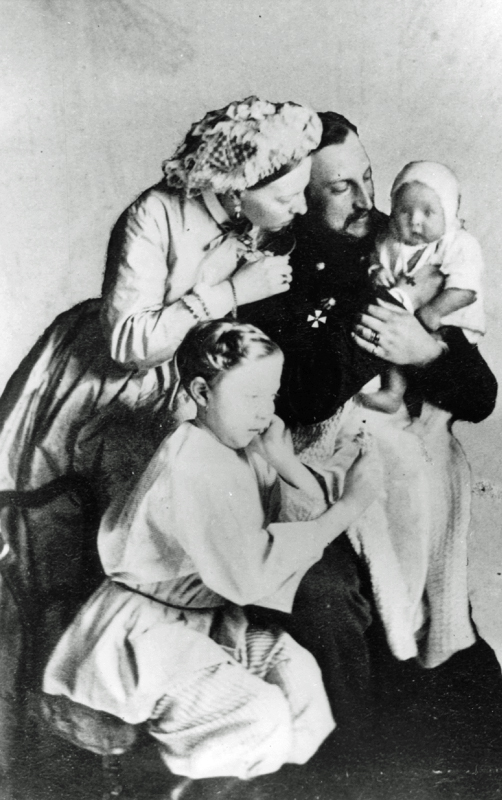
Grand Duke Nicholas Nikolaevich with his wife, Grand Duchess Alexandra Petrovna and their two sons, 1864

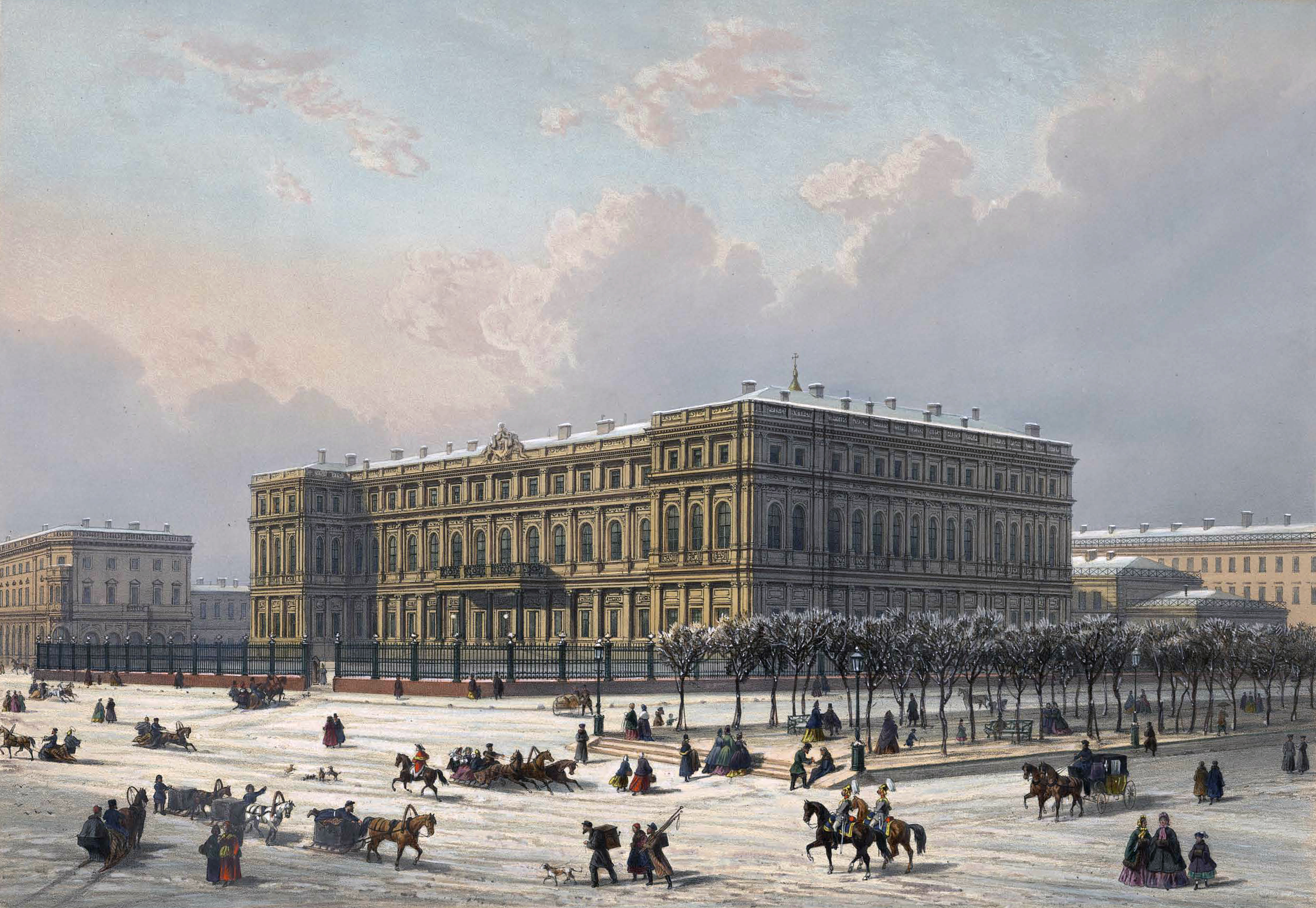
Nicholas Palace in 1861, childhood home of Grand Duke Peter

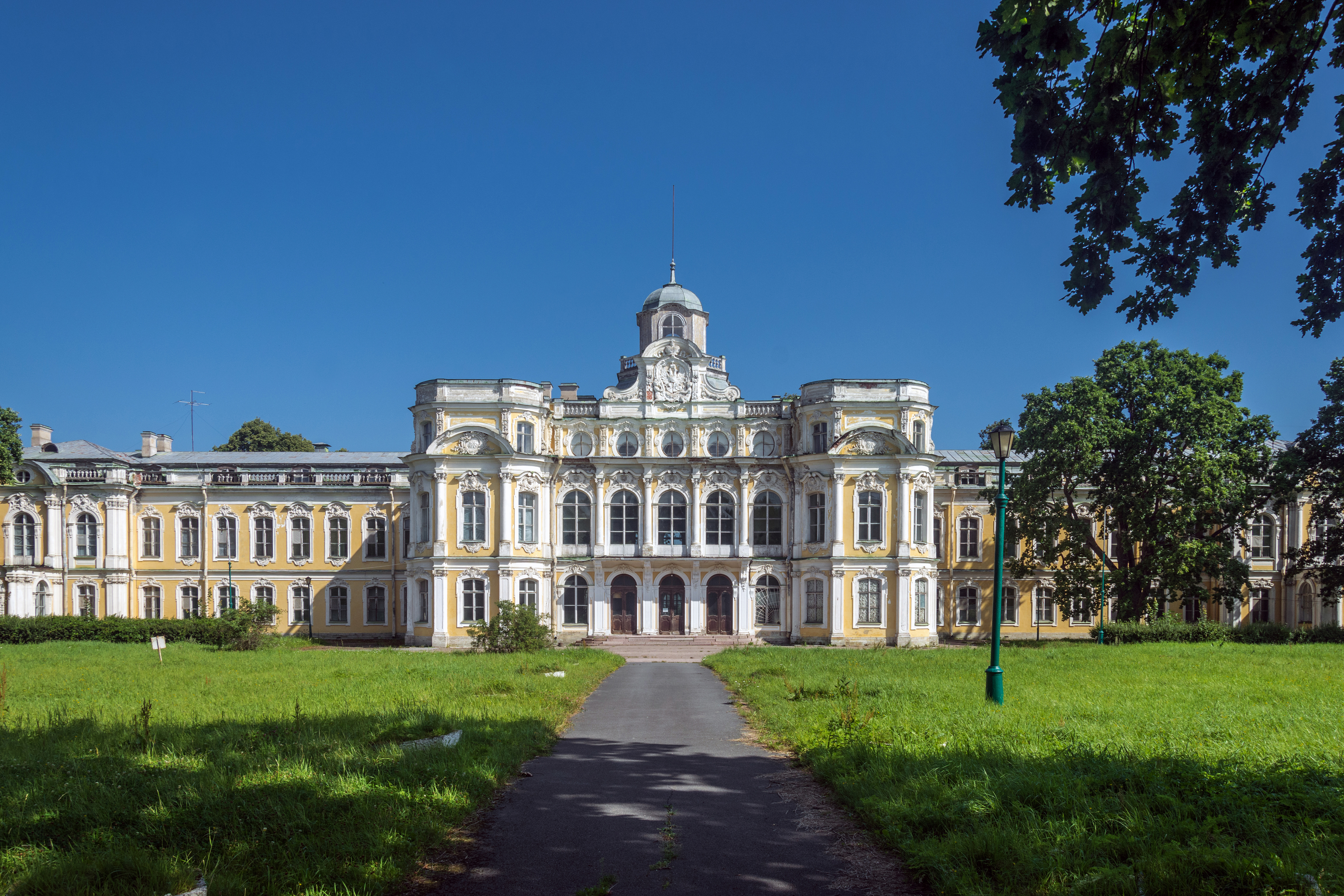
Znamenka Palace, Grand Duke Peter's residence. Znamenka is close to the summer residence of Peterhof, Saint Petersburg (2018)

Grand Duke Peter Nikolaevich was the second and youngest son of Grand Duke Nicholas Nicolaievich the Elder (1831–1891) and Duchess Alexandra of Oldenburg (1838–1900). His father was the sixth child and third son born to Nicholas I of Russia and his Empress consort Alexandra Fedorovna of Prussia (1798–1860). Alexandra Fedorovna was a daughter of Frederick William III of Prussia and Louise of Mecklenburg-Strelitz.

He was born in Saint Petersburg and as a child grew up in the enormous Nicholas Palace build for his parents after their marriage in 1856.

As was the custom for Russian Grand Dukes (the title applied to all sons and grandsons of a Russian Emperor), the Grand Duke Peter served in the Russian army as a Lt.-General and Adjutant-General. Grand Duke Peter had a frail health, suffering from tuberculosis so he spend most of his time away from military duties and often abroad. He was very interested in architecture.

On 26 July 1889, he married Princess Milica of Montenegro (1866–1951), daughter of King Nicholas I of Montenegro (1841–1921). The Grand Duke and Duchess had four children:

- Princess Marina Petrovna of Russia (1892–1981)
- Prince Roman Petrovich of Russia (1896–1978)
- Princess Nadezhda Petrovna of Russia (1898–1988)
- Princess Sofia Petrovna of Russia (3 March 1898 – 3 March 1898); died soon after birth, buried in the convent cemetery in Kyiv by her grandmother, Grand Duchess Alexandra Petrovna, who was a nun there

== Life at court ==
Grand Duke Peter's parents didn't have a successful marriage, eventually living apart. Grand Duke Peter was, especially in adulthood, very attached to his elder brother and only sibling, Grand Duke Nicholas Nikolaevich and the two brothers shared a close relationship the rest of their lives. In 1907 Grand Duke Nicholas Nikolaevich, married Grand Duchess Militza's sister, Princess Anastasia of Montenegro, known as Stana. The two couples were socially very influential at the Russian Imperial Court in the early 20th century. The Grand Duke joined a cult nick-named "the black peril", a group interested in the occult. They are credited with introducing first a charlatan mystic named merely Philippe, and then, with graver consequences, Grigori Rasputin (1869–1916) to the Imperial family. Prince Felix Yussupov (1887–1967) – who was their neighbour in Koreiz – once described Znamenka Palace, the Grand Duke and Grand Duchess's palace, as "the central point of the powers of evil". This was later to be a widely held belief within the higher echelons of the divided Russian court. The Dowager Empress Marie firmly believed that the couple plotted with Rasputin and others to gain influence and favours through the neurotic Empress Alexandra (1872–1918). However, by 1914, Alexandra herself referred to them as "the black family" and felt herself to be manipulated by them.

During the last years of World War I Grand Duke Peter and his family spend much time in the Caucasus, where his older brother, Grand Duke Nicholas was a successful commander-in-chief in the Caucasus region.

== Revolution and exile ==
Grand Duke Peter, his wife and children all survived the Russian Revolution. Right after the revolution they went to their summer palace, Dulber, in Crimea where they lived until 1919. Here, they were subjected to the local Bolsheviks house inspections and threats to their lives but managed to avoid arrests. In 1919, they were rescued by the British battleship HMS Marlborough, along with other members of the imperial family and eventually went to live in the south of France. Here, Grand Duke Peter Nicholaievich died at Cap d'Antibes, near Antibes, on 17 June 1931. His wife died in Alexandria, Egypt, in September 1951.

== Honours and awards ==
The Grand Duke received several Russian and foreign decorations:

Russian

- Knight of St. Andrew, 1864
- Knight of St. Alexander Nevsky, 1864
- Knight of St. Anna, Knight 1st Class, 1864
- Knight of the White Eagle, 1864
- Knight of St. Stanislaus, 1st Class, 11 June 1865
- Knight of St. Vladimir, 4th Class, 1887; 3rd Class, 1901; 2nd Class, 1911

Foreign

- Grand Duchy of Oldenburg: Grand Cross of the Order of Duke Peter Friedrich Ludwig, 12 July 1880
- Grand Duchy of Hesse: Grand Cross of the Ludwig Order, 15 June 1884
- Kingdom of Prussia: Knight of the Black Eagle, 16 September 1884
- Grand Duchy of Baden:
  - Knight of the House Order of Fidelity, 1885
  - Knight of the Order of Berthold the First, 1885
- France: Grand Cross of the Legion of Honour, 4 March 1896
- Kingdom of Italy: Knight of the Most Holy Annunciation, 9 August 1900 - during a visit to Russia of King Victor Emmanuel III of Italy
- Kingdom of Montenegro: Grand Cross of the Order of Prince Danilo I

== Ancestry ==
Ancestors of Grand Duke Peter Nikolaevich of Russia

8. Paul I of Russia
4. Nicholas I of Russia
9. Duchess Sophie Dorothea of Württemberg
2. Grand Duke Nicholas Nikolaevich of Russia
10. Frederick William III of Prussia
5. Princess Charlotte of Prussia
11. Duchess Louise of Mecklenburg-Strelitz
1. Grand Duke Peter Nikolaevich of Russia
12. Duke George of Oldenburg
6. Duke Peter Georgievich of Oldenburg
13. Grand Duchess Catherine Pavlovna of Russia
3. Duchess Alexandra Petrovna of Oldenburg
14. William, Duke of Nassau
7. Princess Therese of Nassau-Weilburg
15. Princess Louise of Saxe-Hildburghausen
