= Princess Marina Petrovna of Russia =

Princess Marina Petrovna
- Princess Marina Petrovna Golitsyna
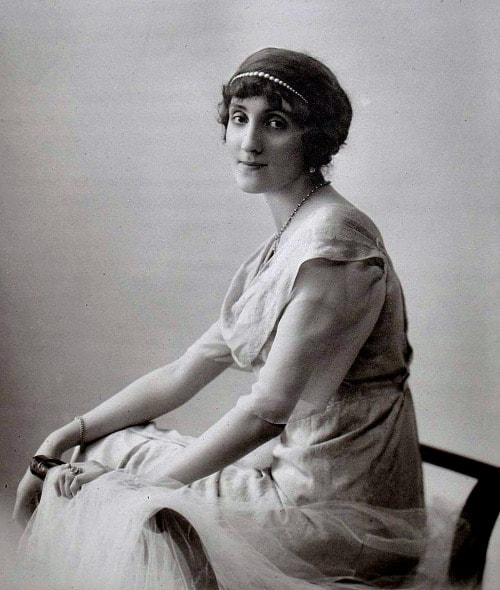
- Born: 11 March 1892; Nice, France
- Died: 15 May 1981 (aged 89); Six-Fours-les-Plages, France
- Spouse: Prince Alexander Nikolayevich Golitsyn (m. 1927; died 1973)
- House: Holstein-Gottorp-Romonov
- Father: Grand Duke Peter Nikolaevich of Russia
- Mother: Princess Milica of Montenegro

Princess Marina Petrovna of Russia (11 March 1892 – 15 May 1981) was the daughter of Grand Duke Peter Nikolaevich of Russia and Grand Duchess Militza Nicholaevna, born Princess of Montenegro.

== Biography ==
A great-granddaughter of Tsar Nicholas I of Russia, she was born in Nice and grew up in the last period of Imperial Russia, mostly in Znamenka, her father's summer palace near Peterhof. She was a maternal granddaughter of Nicholas I, King of Montenegro.

Princess Marina was a gifted artist, showing talent for drawing and painting. She studied painting first with a teacher from the senior school in Yalta and then in Saint Petersburg under professor Kordovsky.

Grand Duchess Maria Pavlovna suggested Princess Marina as a likely bride to the Duke of Montpensier, son of the Count of Paris.

During World War I, Marina served as a nurse with Caucasian troops near Trabzon.

She escaped the Russian Revolution with the rest of her family aboard the British ship HMS Marlborough in 1919. She married Prince Alexander Nikolayevich Golitsyn (13 October 1885 - 24 March 1973) in 1912 in Tsarskoye Selo. She died on 15 May 1981 in Six-Fours-les-Plages, France, at aged 89.
