= Petrodvortsovy District =

Petrodvortsovy District Петродворцовый район (Russian)
- District
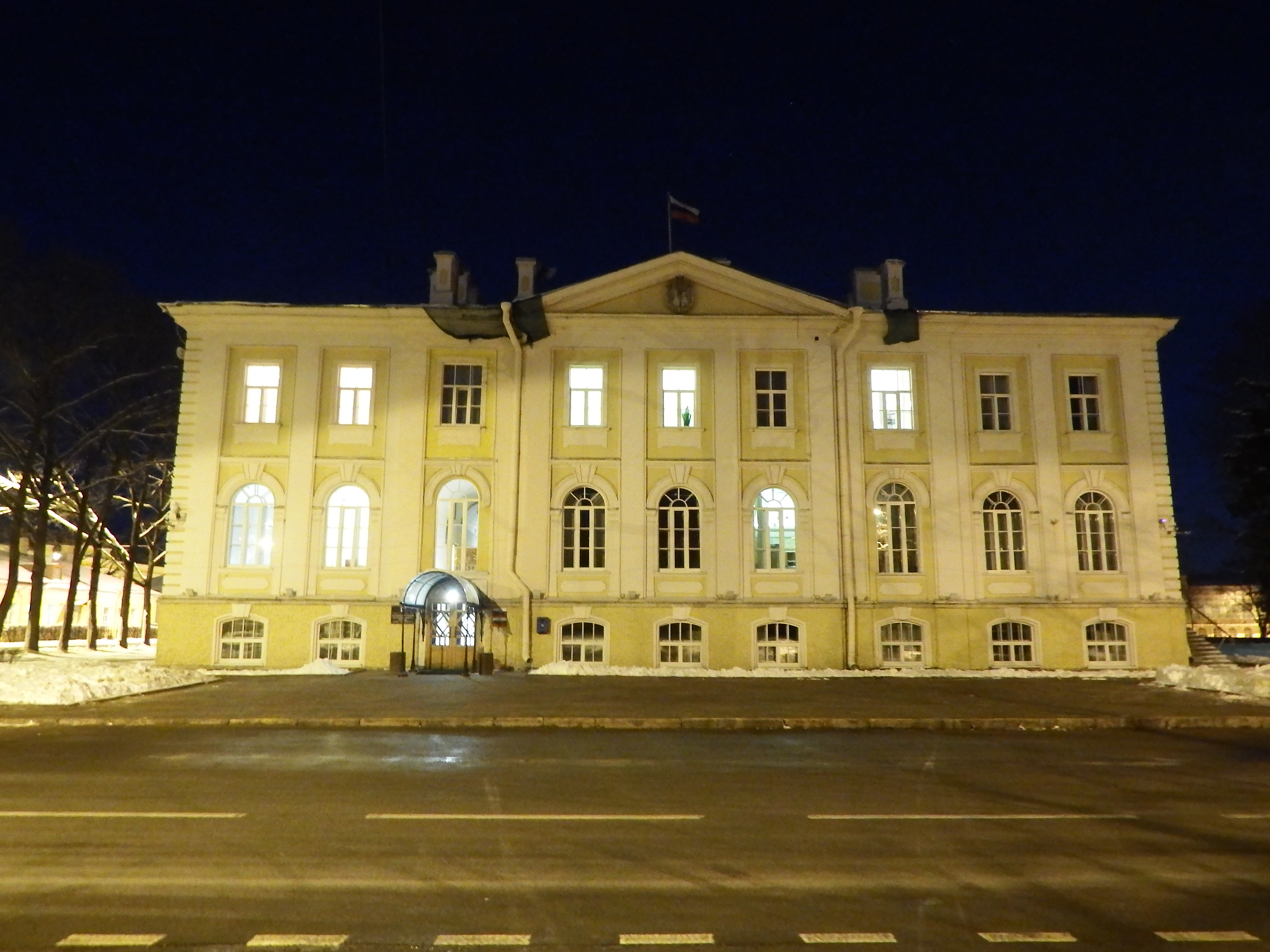
- The building of the Petrodvortsovy District Administration in Petergof
- Petrodvortsovy District on the 2006 map of St. Petersburg
- Coordinates: 59°53′N 29°52′E
- Country: Russia
- Federal subject: federal city of St. Petersburg
- Established: 5 June 1938
- Administrative center: Peterhof

Area
  - Total: 109 km^{2} (42 sq mi)

Population (2010 Census)
  - Total: 128,156
  - Density: 1,180/km^{2} (3,050/sq mi)
- Website: http://gov.spb.ru/gov/terr/reg_petrodv/

Petrodvortsovy District (Russian: Петродворцо́вый райо́н) is a district of the federal city of St. Petersburg, Russia. As of the 2010 Census, its population was 128,156; up from 77,542 recorded in the 2002 Census.

== Municipal divisions ==
Petrodvortsovy District comprises two municipal towns (Lomonosov and Petergof) and one municipal settlement (Strelna).
