= Princess Nadejda Petrovna of Russia =

Russian princess (1898–1988)

Princess Nadejda Petrovna
- Princess Nicholas Orlov
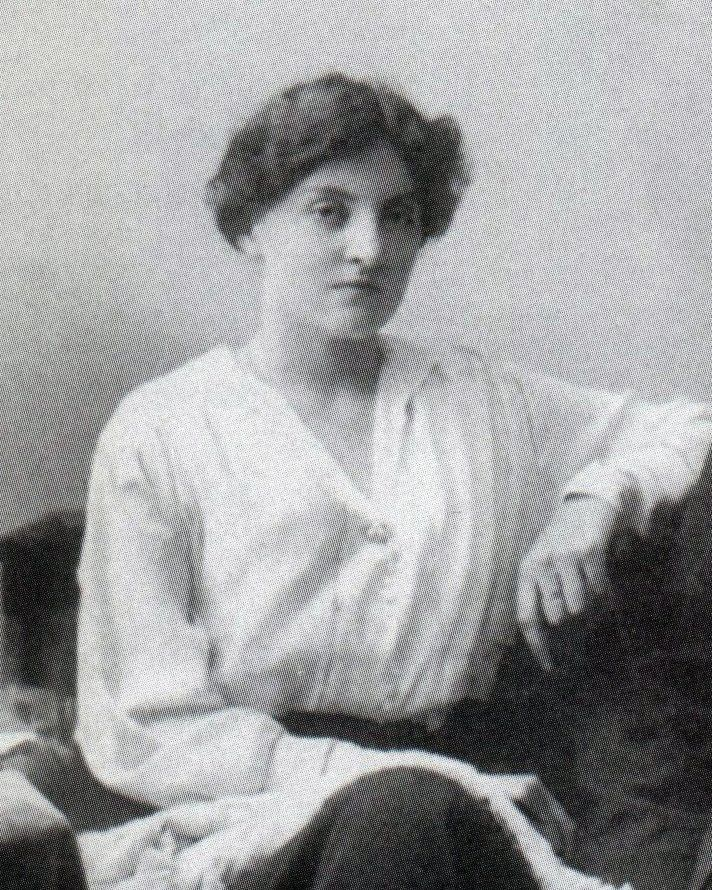
- Nadejda Petrovna (1917)
- Born: 3 March 1898; Dulber, Russian Empire
- Died: 21 April 1988 (aged 90); Chantilly, France
- Spouse: Prince Nicholas Orlov (m. 1917; div. 1940)
- Issue: Princess Irina Nikolaïevna Orlova; Princess Xenia Nikolaievna Orlova
- House: Holstein-Gottorp-Romanov
- Father: Grand Duke Peter Nikolaevich of Russia
- Mother: Princess Milica of Montenegro

Princess Nadejda Petrovna of Russia (Russian: Надежда Петровна; 3 March 1898 – 21 April 1988) was the third child of Grand Duke Peter Nikolaevich of Russia and the former Princess Milica of Montenegro.

== Marriages and children ==
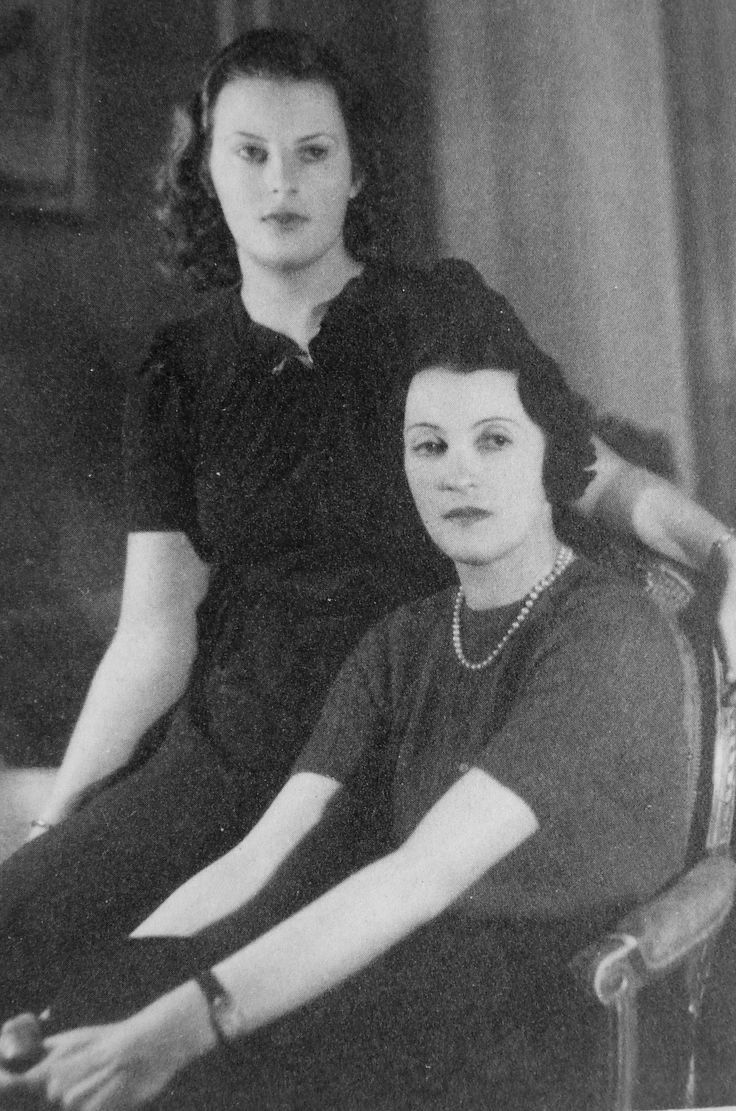
Princess Nadejda with her youngest child Xenia, circa 1936.

Nadejda was engaged before the outbreak of World War I to Prince Oleg Constantinovich of Russia, who was killed in action. Oleg gave her an engagement ring and asked her to return it when he went off to fight, anticipating danger. After Oleg's death, she married Prince Nicholas Vladimirovich Orlov (1891–1961) in the Crimea in April 1917. They were among the Romanovs who escaped the Russian Revolution in 1919 aboard the British ship HMS Marlborough. Their baby daughter Princess Irina Orlova, born in March 1918, was the youngest passenger aboard the ship.

The Orlovs had two daughters:

- Princess Irina Nikolaïevna Orlova (1 March 1918 – 16 September 1989); married 1st in Rome 27 March 1940 (divorced 1946) Baron Hans von Waldstätten (1918–1977); m. 2nd in The Hague 8 January 1960 Anthony Adam Zylstra (1902–1982) She had two daughters from her first marriage.
- Princess Xenia Nikolaievna Orlova (27 March 1921 – 17 August 1963); married 1st in Avon 27 March 1940 (divorced 1950) Paul-Marcel de Montaignac de Pessotte-Bressolles (1909 –); m. 2nd in Paris 14 March 1951 Chevalier Jean Albert d'Almont (1909–2003)

Princess Nadejda divorced in 1940. She died in Chantilly, France in 1988. Her daughters left descendants.

== Honours ==
- (Russian Empire) House of Romanov: Dame of the Imperial Order of Saint Catherine
