= Princess Milica of Montenegro =

Grand Duchess Militza Nikolaevna of Russia

Princess Milica
- Grand Duchess Militza Nikolaevna of Russia
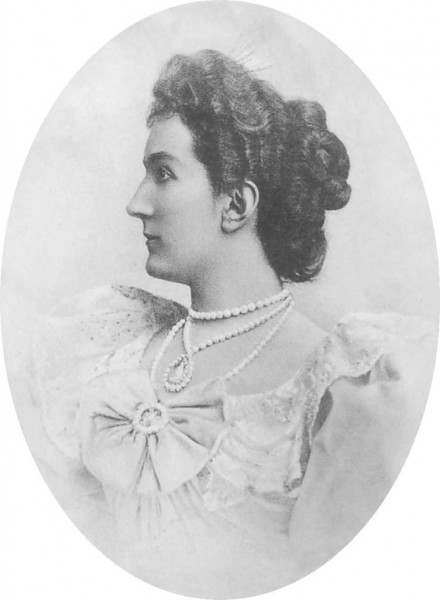
- Born: 14 July 1866; Cetinje, Montenegro
- Died: 5 September 1951 (aged 85); Alexandria, Kingdom of Egypt
- Spouse: Grand Duke Peter Nikolaevich of Russia (m. 1889; died 1931)
- Issue: Princess Marina Petrovna; Prince Roman Petrovich; Princess Nadejda Petrovna; Princess Sofia Petrovna
Names
- Milica Petrović-Njegoš
- House: Petrović-Njegoš
- Father: Nicholas I of Montenegro
- Mother: Milena Vukotić

Princess Milica Petrović-Njegoš of Montenegro, also known as Grand Duchess Militza Nikolaevna of Russia, (14 July 1866 – 5 September 1951) was a Montenegrin princess. She was the daughter of King Nikola I Petrović-Njegoš of Montenegro and Milena Vukotić. Milica was the wife of Grand Duke Peter Nikolaevich of Russia, the younger brother of Grand Duke Nicholas Nikolaevich of Russia, whose wife was Milica's sister, Anastasia.

== Life ==
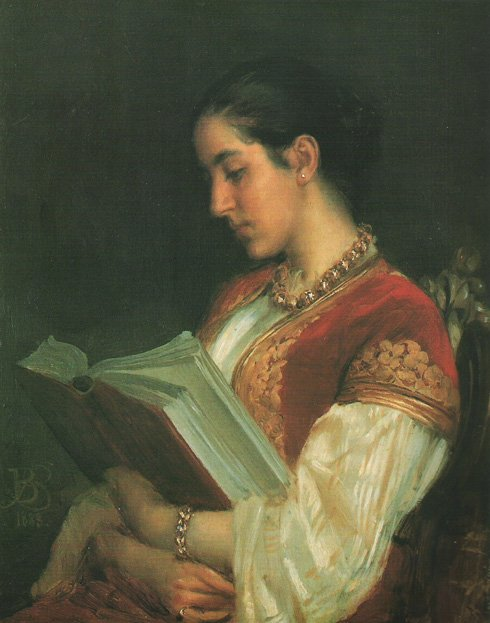
Portrait of Princess Militza of Montenegro by Vlaho Bukovac in 1888

Milica and her sister, Anastasia, were invited by Alexander III of Russia to be educated at the Russian Smolny Institute, which was a school for "noble maids".

Grand Duke Peter Nikolaevich of Russia and Princess Milica were married on 26 July 1889 in Saint Petersburg. She was the first princess to marry in to the Imperial family who was already an Orthodox and did not need to convert in order to marry. She was described as well educated, intelligent and arrogant, and the opposite of her introverted spouse.

Both sisters were socially influential at the Russian Imperial Court. Milica and Anastasia were both ambitious on behalf of their husbands, and attempted to gain influence with the Empress and through her on the Emperor. Their machinations were reviled by most imperial family members and the rest of the royal court. Nicknamed jointly "The Black Peril”, “The Crows”, and “The Cockroaches” the sisters were both observant Russian Orthodox Christians and deeply interested in the occult. They introduced the Imperial Family to the mystic Philippe Nizier-Vashod (usually referred to merely as "Monsieur Philippe") and then to strannik Grigori Rasputin. In 1909 however, the sisters lost their influence with the Empress.

Milica and her spouse spent a lot of time abroad because of Peter's fragile health. During the First World War, they lived in the Crimea. From Yalta in the Crimea, Anastasia and her husband escaped Russia in 1919 aboard a British battleship, HMS Marlborough. They settled in Italy, living with her sister Elena, Queen of Italy and when the Italian monarchy was abolished in 1947 she left for Egypt.

== Children ==
Grand Duke Peter Nikolaevich of Russia and Princess Milica were married on 26 July 1889 in Saint Petersburg. The couple had four children:

- Princess Marina Petrovna of Russia (1892–1981).
- Prince Roman Petrovich of Russia (1896–1978).
- Princess Nadejda Petrovna of Russia (1898–1988).
- Princess Sofia Petrovna of Russia (born and died 3 March 1898); buried in the convent cemetery in Kyiv by her grandmother, Grand Duchess Alexandra Petrovna, who was a nun there.
