= List of Russian Princes of the Blood Imperial =

Prince of Blood Imperial or Princess of the Blood Imperial (Russian: Князь императорской крови) were the titles used in the Russian Empire from the late eighteenth century onwards for members of the extended Imperial Family of Russia. The title was granted to male-line great-grandchildren, and their descendants (as well as the wives of male members of the family) instead of the higher-ranking Grand Duke of Russia or Grand Duchess of Russia (Russian: великий князь), which carried the style Imperial Highness, which was thereafter restricted to the children and male-line grandchildren of an Emperor. Although the title had existed in theory since 1797, it was used from 1886 onwards due to changes instituted by Emperor Alexander III to address the proliferation of members of the wider Imperial Family of Russia during the nineteenth century. The ever-growing number of Grand Dukes and Duchesses in the late 19th century placed increased pressure on the Imperial Treasury to fund the state annuities which each Grand Duke and Grand Duchess was entitled to.

== Background ==
In 1886 Emperor Alexander III altered the use of titles in the Imperial House by amendment to the succession laws. The growing size of the Imperial Family of Russia throughout the nineteenth century had incurred a corresponding increase to the cost to the Imperial Treasury of the annuities of each Grand Duke and Duchess.

Under the existing 1797 Laws of the Imperial Family, title of Grand Duke/Duchess and style of Imperial Highness was granted to all children, and male-line grandchildren, great-grandchildren and great-great-grandchildren of an Emperor. Reform of the Laws which governed the Imperial Family had been discussed as early as 1884.

On 5 July 1886 a son was born to the Emperor's first cousin Grand Duke Konstantin Konstantinovich and his wife Grand Duchess Elizabeth Mavrikievna; the infant Grand Duke, John Konstantinovich, was the first legitimate male-line great-grandson of an Emperor born into the wider Imperial Family. The arrival of the first member of the next generation of Grand Dukes in the Romanov Family prompted the Emperor to alter the entitlement to the title and style of Grand Duke/Duchess of Russia and Imperial Highness by amending the "Fundamental Laws" which regulated membership of the Imperial Family.

The changes, announced nine days after the birth of Grand Duke John Konstantinovich (known thereafter as Prince John Konstantinovich), restricted the title of Grand Duke or Grand Duchess and style of Imperial Highness to the children and male-line grandchildren of an Emperor of Russia.

The male-line great-grandchildren of an Emperor would instead receive the title of Prince of the Blood Imperial or Princess of the Blood Imperial and be entitled to the use lower-ranking style of Highness. The Senior male-line male heir of each great-grandson of an Emperor would also be entitled to use the style of Highness regardless of how many generations in descent from an Emperor they each were. Sources differ as to whether the use of "Highness" by each senior male heir of a great-grandson of an Emperor was granted for life; the only example of such an individual prior to the revolution was Prince Vsevolod Ivanovich of Russia. Born on 20 January 1914, on the following day Nicholas II declared Prince Vsevolod to be a Prince of the Blood Imperial with the style of Highness.

All other male-line great-great-grandchildren of an Emperor and more remote male-line descendants would continue to be a Prince or Princess of the Blood Imperial, but were only granted use the still-lower style of Serene Highness.

The wives of Grand Dukes and Princes who formed dynastic (i.e. non-morganatic) marriages were entitled to take on their husband's rank and style.

Alexander III's own grandchildren would be later affected by the change; in 1894 his younger daughter Grand Duchess Xenia married her first-cousin-once-removed Grand Duke Alexander Mikhailovich. Under the 1886 changes, Xenia and Alexander Mikhailovich's children derived their rank and titles as male-line great-grandchildren of Emperor Nicholas I through their father, rather than as female-line grandchildren of Alexander III, and consequently were only entitled to the style and title of Highness and Prince/Princess of the Blood Imperial.

Status of Romanov Descendants^{§} under Imperial Family Statutes
Degree of descent from a former or living Emperor	1797 Statute on the Imperial Family	1886 Statute on the Imperial Family
Children of an Emperor	Imperial Highness and Grand Duke or Grand Duchess of Russia	Imperial Highness and Grand Duke or Grand Duchess of Russia
Male-line grandchildren of an Emperor	Imperial Highness and Grand Duke or Grand Duchess of Russia	Imperial Highness and Grand Duke or Grand Duchess of Russia
Male-line great-grandchildren of an Emperor	Imperial Highness and Grand Duke or Grand Duchess of Russia	Highness and Prince or Princess of the Blood Imperial
Male-line great-great-grandchildren of an Emperor	Imperial Highness and Grand Duke or Grand Duchess of Russia	Serene Highness^{†} and Prince or Princess of the Blood Imperial
Male-line great-great-great-grandchildren of an Emperor	Highness and Prince or Princess of the Blood Imperial	Serene Highness^{†} and Prince or Princess of the Blood Imperial

^{§}Limited to Romanov descendants born from "dynastic" (non-morganatic) marriages.

^{†}The senior male descendant in the male line of each great-grandson of an Emperor was entitled to the higher style of Highness, regardless of how many generations removed they were from an Emperor.

=== Finances and Annuities ===
Varying figures have been published regarding the size of the state-funded annuities which members of the Imperial Family received under the 1886 changes to the "Fundamental Laws" of the Imperial Family.

Grand Dukes reportedly received life annuities of 280,000 roubles from the Imperial Treasury. In his memoirs, published in the early 1930s Grand Duke Alexander Mikhailovich of Russia states that Grand Dukes received the equivalent of US$50,000 per year (paid into a Trust) from birth until the age of 20, and $100,000 annually thereafter; based on the approximate exchange rates of ₽2:$1 in the late 19th century and ₽3:$1 from 1914 to 1917, this supports the approximate figure of 100,000 roubles annually from birth and 200,000 roubles annually once each Grand Duke reached the age of majority.

Grand Duchess reportedly received a dowry of 1,000,000 (approximately $500,000 or £100,000 in 1886) roubles upon their marriage. This was also the figure provided by Grand Duke Michael Alexandrovich, who stated that the dowry of each Grand Duchess was $500,000. Other sources suggest that an additional annuity of 50,000 roubles from birth, increased to 100,000 roubles upon reaching a majority was paid to all Grand Duchesses, and that a one-off 1,000,000 rouble payment was made to all Grand Duchesses and Grand Dukes when they married.

Princes and Princesses of the Blood Imperial who were male-line great-grandchildren of an Emperor were not entitled to an annuity under the 1886 changes, but were provided with a one-off lump sum payment of 1,000,000 roubles at birth. This figure is supported by Grand Duke Alexander Mikhailovich, who provided a figure of US$500,000.

Alternative figures are listed in a number of contemporary sources; the 1912 edition of the Svod Zakonov (the Russian Empire’s official Digest of Laws) reprints the revised Statute on the Imperial Family which was approved on 2/14 July 1886. This defines who qualified for titles and how support was structured. The Brockhaus & Efron Encyclopedic Dictionary (1890s), a standard Russian reference work, summarizes the administrative stipend scales then in force for imperial children and grandchildren. These sources are examined in Mikhail Dolbilov’s 2023 peer-reviewed study "Managing the Ruling House: Royals, Bureaucrats, and the Emergence of the 1886 Statute on the Imperial Family of the Russian Empire", which offers a detailed examination of the post-1886 financial provisions for the Imperial Family, with reference to the 1886 “Norms of financing” (RGIA) section. These sources provide the following data on the annuities and financial entitlements of the wider Romanov Family during the period from 1886 to 1917:

Financial Entitlements for Members of the Russian Imperial Family after 1886
Rank of Family Member	Financial Entitlement at Birth	Financial Entitlement from Majority	Financial Entitlement upon marriage
Sons of the Emperor (Grand Dukes)	₽33,000 per year prior to majority.	Annuity increased to ₽150,000 per year; and granted a one-off lump sum of ₽1,000,000.	Annuity increased to ₽200,000 per year, plus a separate ₽40,000 annuity granted to their wife, who also received one-time grants of ₽100,000 (from Emperor) and ₽50,000 (from husband). The widow of the son of an Emperor would continue to receive ₽40,000 annually (reduced to one-third of this amount if residing abroad during their widowhood, and ceasing to be paid if she remarried).
Daughters of the Emperor (Grand Duchesses)	₽33,000 per year to majority.	Annuity increased to ₽50,000 per year until marriage.	₽50,000 annuity ceases, replaced by a Dowry lump-sum payment of ₽1,000,000 (held in Trust in Russia with income paid at 5%).
Male-line Grandsons of an Emperor (Grand Dukes)	₽15,000 per year to majority.	Annuity increased to ₽150,000 per year; and granted a one-off lump-sum of ₽600,000.	No increase in individual annuity, but a separate annuity of ₽20,000 was paid to their wife, who also would receive one-time grants of ₽100,000 (from Emperor) and ₽50,000 (from husband). The widow of the grandson of an Emperor would continue to receive ₽20,000 annually (reduced to one-third of this amount if residing abroad during their widowhood, and ceasing to be paid if she remarried).
Male-line Granddaughters of an Emperor (Grand Duchesses)	₽15,000 per year to majority.	Annuity increased to ₽50,000 per year until marriage.	₽50,000 annuity ceases, replaced by a Dowry lump-sum payment of ₽1,000,000 (held in Trust in Russia with income paid at 5%).

== Princes of the Imperial Blood ==
Picture	Name	Father	Born	Died	Notes
First Generation
	Prince John Konstantinovich	Grand Duke Konstantin Konstantinovich	5 July 1886	18 July 1918	Ioann Konstantinovich was born as a Grand Duke of Russia with the style Imperial Highness, but at the age of 9 days, an Ukaz of his cousin Emperor Alexander III of Russia stripped him of that title, as the Ukaz amended the House Law by limiting the grand-ducal title to grandsons of a reigning emperor. As a result, he received the title Prince of the Imperial Blood (Prince of Russia) with the style Highness. Princess Catherine Ivanovna
File:Prince Gavril.jpg	Prince Gabriel Konstantinovich	Grand Duke Konstantin Konstantinovich	15 July 1887	28 February 1955	Was elevated to the dignity of Grand Duke and the style of Imperial Highness by the head of the Imperial House of Russia on 15 May 1939
	Prince Constantine Konstantinovich	Grand Duke Konstantin Konstantinovich	1 January 1891	18 July 1918	
	Prince Oleg Konstantinovich	Grand Duke Konstantin Konstantinovich	27 November 1892	27 September 1914	
	Prince Igor Konstantinovich	Grand Duke Konstantin Konstantinovich	10 June 1894	18 July 1918	
	Prince Georgy Konstantinovich	Grand Duke Konstantin Konstantinovich	6 May 1903	7 November 1938	
	Prince Roman Petrovich	Grand Duke Peter Nikolaevich	17 October 1896	23 October 1978	
	Prince Andrew Alexandrovich	Grand Duke Alexander Mikhailovich	24 January 1897	8 May 1981	
	Prince Theodore Alexandrovich	Grand Duke Alexander Mikhailovich	23 December 1898	30 November 1968	
	Prince Nikita Alexandrovich	Grand Duke Alexander Mikhailovich	13 January 1900	12 September 1974	
	Prince Dmitri Alexandrovich	Grand Duke Alexander Mikhailovich	15 August 1901	7 July 1980	
	Prince Rostislav Alexandrovich	Grand Duke Alexander Mikhailovich	2 November 1902	31 July 1978	
	Prince Basil Alexandrovich	Grand Duke Alexander Mikhailovich	7 July 1907	24 June 1989	
Second Generation
	Prince Vladimir Kirillovich	Grand Duke Kirill Vladimirovich	30 August 1917	21 April 1992	Became Grand Duke in 1922; Pretender 1938–1992
	Prince Vsevolod Ioannovich	Prince John Konstantinovich	20 January 1914	18 June 1973	

== Princesses of the Imperial Blood ==
Picture	Name	Father	Born	Died	Royal Liniadge	Husband	Title
	Tatiana Constantinovna	Grand Duke Konstantin Konstantinovich	23 January 1890	28 August 1979	great-granddaughter of Nicholas I	Prince Constantine Bagration-Mukhransky of Georgia	Princess Constantine Bagration-Mukhransky of Georgia
	Tatiana Constantinovna	Grand Duke Konstantin Konstantinovich	23 January 1890	28 August 1979	great-granddaughter of Nicholas I	Alexander Vassilievich Korotchenzov	Princess Constantine Bagration-Mukhransky of Georgia
	Natalia Konstantinovna	Grand Duke Konstantin Konstantinovich	1905	1905; two months later	great-granddaughter of Nicholas I		
	Vera Constantinovna	Grand Duke Konstantin Konstantinovich	24 April 1906	11 January 2001	great-granddaughter of Nicholas I		
	Marina Petrovna	Grand Duke Peter Nikolaevich	5 July 1886	18 July 1918	great-granddaughter of Nicholas I	Prince Alexander Nikolayevich Golitsyn	Princess Marina Petrovna Golitsyna
	Nadejda Petrovna	Grand Duke Peter Nikolaevich	3 March 1898	21 April 1988	great-granddaughter of Nicholas I	Prince Nicholas Orlov	Princess Nicholas Orlov
	Sophia Petrovna	Grand Duke Peter Nikolaevich	3 March 1898		great-granddaughter of Nicholas I		
	Nina Georgievna	Grand Duke George Mikhailovich	20 June 1901	27 February 1974	great-granddaughter of Nicholas I	Prince Paul Aleksandrovich Chavchavadze	Princess Paul Aleksandrovich Chavchavadze
	Xenia Georgievna	Grand Duke George Mikhailovich	22 August 1903	17 September 1965	great-granddaughter of Nicholas I	William Bateman Leeds Jr.	
	Xenia Georgievna	Grand Duke George Mikhailovich	22 August 1903	17 September 1965	great-granddaughter of Nicholas I	Herman Jud	
	Irene Alexandrovna	Grand Duke Alexander Mikhailovich	15 July 1895	26 February 1970	great-granddaughter of Nicholas I	Prince Felix Felixovich Yusupov	Princess Felix Yusupov
	Maria Kirillovna	Grand Duke Kirill Vladimirovich	2 February 1907	25 October 1951	great-granddaughter of Alexander II	The Prince of Leiningen	The Princess of Leiningen
	Kira Kirillovna	Grand Duke Kirill Vladimirovich	9 May 1909	8 September 1967	great-granddaughter of Alexander II	The Prince of Prussia	The Princess of Prussia
	Catherine Ioannovna	Prince Ioann Konstantinovich	12 July 1915	13 March 2007	great-great-granddaughter of Nicholas I	The Marquess of Villaforesta	The Marchioness of Villaforesta

== Princesses of the Imperial Blood by marriage ==
Picture I	NamB	Husband	Date of marriage	Born	Died	Title	Notes
	Princess Helen of Serbia	Prince John Constantinovich	3 September 1911	4 November 1884	16 October 1962	Her Royal Highness Princess Elena Petrovna of Russia	As the daughter of a sovereign, she held the style of a Royal Highness, unlike her husband or other princess by marriage.
