= Leggo My Meg-O =

- Family Guy episode
- Episode no.: Season 10; Episode 20
- Directed by: John Holmquist
- Written by: Brian Scully
- Production code: 9ACX16
- Original air date: May 6, 2012

Guest appearances
- Omid Abtahi as Prince Faisal; Bill English as Middle Eastern guard; Ralph Garman as Gym teacher; Mark Hentemann

Episode chronology
← Previous "Mr. and Mrs. Stewie"	Next → "Tea Peter"
- Family Guy season 10

"Leggo My Meg-O" is the twentieth episode in the tenth season of the American animated television series Family Guy, and the 185th episode overall. It originally aired on the Fox network in the United States on May 6, 2012. In this episode, Meg travels to Paris with her friend Ruth after being treated badly in school, but her exciting adventure comes to a halt when she gets kidnapped. Brian and Stewie embark on an action-packed mission to find her before it is too late. This plot is a parody of the 2008 film Taken.

This episode was written by Brian Scully and directed by John Holmquist. It received mixed reviews from critics for its storyline and cultural references. It was viewed by 5.64 million U.S. viewers in its original airing, according to Nielsen ratings. The episode's guest stars were Omid Abtahi, Bill English, Ralph Garman, Mark Hentemann, Jerry Lambert, Rachael MacFarlane, Natasha Melnick, Kim Parks, Julius Sharpe, Danny Smith, Alec Sulkin, Fred Tatasciore, John Viener, and Lisa Wilhoit.

== Plot ==
After being assaulted with dodgeballs by Connie D'Amico and other girls during gym class, Meg talks to her friend Ruth about how much she hates being at school and wonders if she can tolerate the rest of the semester. She then learns that Ruth is going to spend a semester in Paris and is invited to join her in the program. Using the money she has saved from part-time jobs, Meg is able to enroll in the program. The family sees her leave as she enters the airport. Once she and Ruth land in Paris, they meet a man who offers to share a cab with them as they go to their apartment. When the two of them arrive at the apartment, a group of men arrive and kidnap Ruth while Meg is talking to Peter on the phone. When she tells Peter what she witnessed, he tells her to hide under the bed. She complies, but the men find her and take her away. After Peter talks to the kidnappers, offering them a pittance to save Meg, one of them tells him "Drakkar Noir" before hanging up.

The Griffins call the FBI to retrieve Meg, but the FBI are unable to take action unless Meg has been missing for 96 hours, by which time it may already be too late. Concerned by the idiocy of the government, Brian and Stewie get to Paris themselves to take matters into their own hands and save Meg. They find out where the men took Meg, who is about to be sold as a sex slave. At the auction, Stewie dresses up as a slave and Brian dresses as an Arab to get in, and Stewie is sold to Brian (for $500,000). However, Brian cannot afford to pay for Stewie, and the guard uncovers their disguises. They are chained to a pipe downstairs, but Brian breaks free and overpowers the guard. They then follow Meg and her captors to a yacht traveling down the River Seine. On board, Meg is delivered to an Arab emir waiting in the master stateroom. After Meg refuses to be his sex slave, the emir reveals he bought her not to be a sex slave but to be his son's wife. The king introduces his teenage son Faisal, the young prince of the kingdom, who calls Meg a "goddess" and asks her to marry him or if she declines he will have her flown back to America on their private jet. Meg agrees to marry him, but Stewie then kills Faisal, unsure of his real intentions, uses a neuralizer on Meg, knocking her out, and takes her to a French hospital for treatment before taking her home safely.

Back at home, the family is happy to see Meg, who admits remembering nothing between the proposal and the hospital. Lois tells Meg that Ruth was found alive with her tongue ripped out.

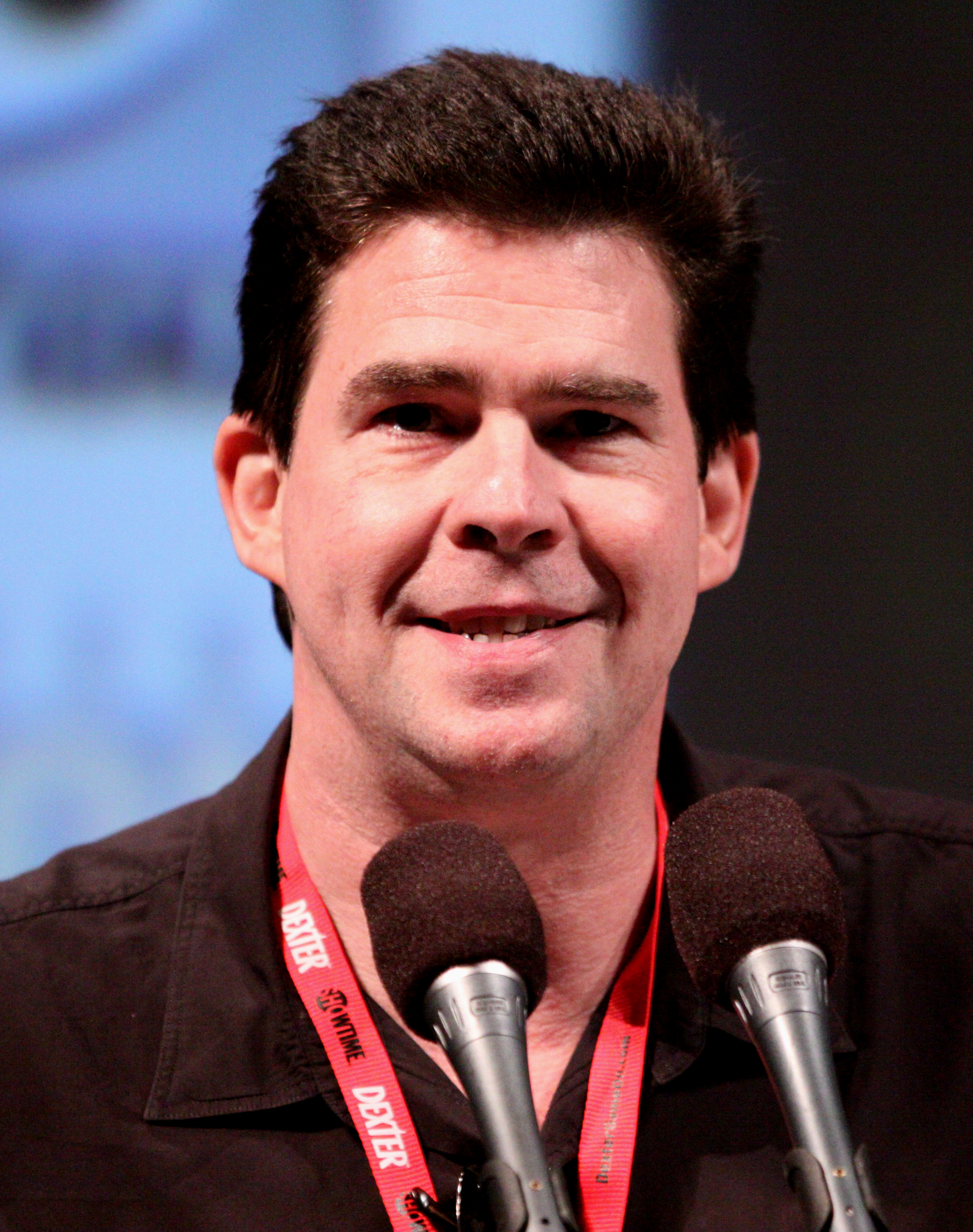
Ralph Garman guest starred in this episode as Meg's gym teacher.

== Production and cultural references ==
The episode was written by Brian Scully and directed by John Holmquist. Danny Smith, Alec Sulkin and Wellesley Wild served as executive producers, and James Purdum and Domonic Bianchi as supervising directors.

Guest stars and recurring actors Omid Abtahi, Bill English, Ralph Garman, Mark Hentemann, Jerry Lambert, Rachael MacFarlane, Natasha Melnick, Kim Parks, Julius Sharpe, Danny Smith, Alec Sulkin, Fred Tatasciore, John Viener and Lisa Wilhoit made appearances throughout the episode.

Some cultural references were included in this episode. The plot of this episode is based on the film Taken. Peter's phone call to the kidnappers is a reference to the film. The title of this episode is a reference to Kellogg's Eggo waffles slogan "L'eggo-my-eggo!" Stewie wipes out Meg's memory using a neuralyzer similar to those used in the Men in Black films.

== Reception ==
In its original broadcast on May 6, 2012 on Fox, "Leggo My Meg-O" was watched by 5.64 million viewers according to Nielsen ratings, and aired on the same night as MacFarlane's other show American Dad!. It gained a 2.7/7 rating share in the 18–49 demographic group, having the same rating as Desperate Housewives, and beating American Dad!. The ratings decreased from the previous episode, "Mr. and Mrs. Stewie".

The episode received average reviews from critics. Kevin McFarland of The A.V. Club gave the episode B− rating. He said the episode "[was] filled with more laughs than [he] predicted". While stating that Meg's humor comes from the same place each time, he enjoyed the action scenes in the episode. Carter Doston of TV Fanatic gave the episode a 2.5/5 rating. He noted that the episode leaned on Taken too much, however he enjoyed some funny moments in it. He stated that "the story seriously follows the same arc as the movie, just in 20 minutes. They find the Eastern Europeans who sold her to slavers, go on a car chase to rescue her and enter into a shootout on a boat to rescue her." He continued, "Of course, there are jokes thrown in, and some humorous deconstructions of action movies and of the movie it parodies. For example, the 'car chase GPS' scene."

== See also ==
- Abduction of Chloe Ayling
