= Family Guy Viewer Mail =

Family Guy Viewer Mail may refer to:

- "Family Guy Viewer Mail #1", 2002 episode of Family Guy
- "Family Guy Viewer Mail #2", 2012 episode of Family Guy
