= Cavemen (TV series) =

American sitcom

- Genre: Sitcom
- Based on: Characters from the GEICO commercials by The Martin Agency
- Developed by: Joe Lawson; Josh Gordon Will Speck
- Starring: Bill English; Nick Kroll; Sam Huntington; Kaitlin Doubleday; Jeff Daniel Phillips
- Theme music composer: Mickey Petralia; Jude Christodal
- Country of origin: United States
- Original language: English
- No. of seasons: 1
- No. of episodes: 13

Production
- Camera setup: Single-camera
- Running time: 30 minutes
- Production companies: Double Vision Productions; Television 360; ABC Studios

Original release
- Network: ABC
- Release: October 2 – November 13, 2007

Cavemen is an American sitcom that aired on ABC from October 2 to November 20, 2007. The show was developed by Joe Lawson, Josh Gordon and Will Speck, based on the GEICO Cavemen TV commercials, which were also written by Lawson. It was described by the network as a "unique buddy comedy that offers a clever twist on stereotypes and turns race relations on its head", and is set in San Diego, California. The show earned an extremely negative reception, becoming regarded as one of the worst television shows of all time.

== Plot ==
In the series, cavemen were never really fully supplanted by modern humans, but integrated into Homo sapiens civilization as a separate species sub-group. Cavemen are a small but widespread minority group that have been present in every global civilization since the dawn of recorded history (a montage scene in the opening credits shows Cavemen in Egyptian hieroglyphs, when George Washington crossed the Delaware River, standing with Abraham Lincoln, participating in the space program, etc.). Effectively, Cavemen form another ethnic minority in the modern world, which faces several prejudices from Homo sapiens (sometimes referring to humans by the derogatory term "Smoothies" in reference to their relative lack of hair, or "Sapes" in reference to their species). Although these cavemen self-identify as Cro-Magnon, their facial appearance and physical anatomy is reminiscent of the Neanderthal.

Some Cavemen attempt to pass as Homo sapiens by shaving off their body hair - other Cavemen call them "Shavers". The central humor of the show is that Caveman characters are not brutish primitives, but fully integrated into white-collar jobs; the central Cavemen characters are effete modern city-dwellers. They must also endure racial epithets such as "Magger", a pun based on "Cro-Magnon".

The series focuses on three Cavemen roommates who share a condo: Joel, his brother Andy, and their cynical and self-absorbed roommate Nick.

According to producer Joe Lawson, the show was originally going to be set in Newport News, Virginia, due to its proximity to the water. The setting then changed to Atlanta, Georgia and finally San Diego, California.

== Cast ==
=== Main ===
- Bill English as Joel Claybrook
- Nick Kroll as Nick Hedge
- Sam Huntington as Andy Claybrook
- Kaitlin Doubleday as Kate McKinney
- Jeff Daniel Phillips as Maurice
- Stephanie Lemelin as Thorne
- Julie White as Leslie McKinney

=== Recurring ===
- John Heard as Tripp McKinney
- Evan Shafran as Nathan
- J. P. Manoux as Glen
- Kim Director as Heather
- Stephanie Courtney as Diane

== Production history ==
=== Conception ===
In March 2007, ABC gave a pilot order to a script written by Joe Lawson which was inspired by the GEICO Cavemen advertisements. Lawson would be executive producer alongside Guymon Casady, Daniel Rappaport, Will Speck and Josh Gordon. Gordon and Speck also developed the series with Lawson and directed the pilot. Later in the same month, Bill Martin and Mike Schiff joined the staff as executive producers. ABC gave the series an early pick-up and a 13-episode order on May 11, 2007.

=== Casting ===
When the pilot was approved by the network in March, it was unclear if the original actors, Jeff Daniel Phillips and Ben Weber, who played the cavemen in the advertisements, were going to be part of the series. This was not to be when it was later reported that Nick Kroll, Kaitlin Doubleday, and Bill English had all landed roles in the series in the same month. Dash Mihok and Stephanie Lemelin were respectively cast in April as Jamie, Joel's younger brother, and Thorne, a party girl. John Heard rounded out the regular cast when he was chosen to play Trip in the same month. Mihok was replaced by Sam Huntington and the character of Jamie was renamed Andy in July. Tony Award winner Julie White was also promoted to a regular cast member as Kate's mother in the same month.

In July 2007 it was announced that Phillips had been cast for the series. He subsequently appeared in the first broadcast episode playing Maurice, a friend of the three main characters.

=== Pilot episode controversy ===
The initial limited screening of the pilot episode was met with a less than favorable reception. The pilot was accused of being racist as some critics thought the Cavemen were being used as a metaphor for African-Americans and other minorities. The series subsequently underwent a major creative "retooling", which included changing the show's venue from Atlanta, Georgia to San Diego, California. The pilot episode has remained unaired on ABC.

=== Reception ===
In terms of reception from the media the show was "critically savaged". The Chicago Tribune listed it as one of the 25 worst TV shows ever, and Adam Buckman of the New York Post declared the show "extinct on arrival." Ginia Bellafante of The New York Times wrote "I laughed. But I laughed through my pain. 'Cavemen,' set in some version of San Diego where people speak with Southern accents, doesn’t have moments as much as microseconds suspended from any attempt at narrative."

Other critics were more forgiving: Pulitzer Prize-winning columnist Dorothy Rabinowitz said that the show "has its charms... The chief source of that charm is the unmistakable hint of wit in the writing. Only a hint – but it's steady, which is enough to seduce."

In 2010, TV Guide Network listed the show at #22 on their list of 25 Biggest TV Blunders, arguing that basing a TV show on a commercial was a bad idea from the beginning.

=== Broadcast ===
Produced by ABC Studios and Management 360, the series originally aired alongside Carpoolers on Tuesday nights at 8:00 pm Eastern/7:00 pm Central. The series was placed on hiatus during the Writers Guild of America strike, and canceled before the strike ended. A total of 13 episodes were produced. The final six episodes never aired in US markets but did however air in Australia, where it aired on Channel Seven.

=== Post-cancellation ===
After the show's cancellation, a Geico commercial was aired during Super Bowl XLII in which two cavemen watched television, switched it off, and had an exchange about Cavemen.

All 13 episodes were originally supposed to be released on DVD in 2008; however, plans were put on hold.

== List of episodes ==
No.	Title	Directed by	Written by	Original release date	Prod. code
1	"Pilot"	Will Speck and Josh Gordon	Story by : Joe Lawson & Josh Gordon & Will Speck; Teleplay by : Joe Lawson	Unaired (US); September 10, 2008 (AUS)	101
Joel, Andy and Nick are invited to a private barbecue which Kate's parents are having. Joel attempts to get Kate's father's blessing for him and Kate to marry.
2	"Her Embarrassed of Caveman"	Will Speck and Josh Gordon	Bill Martin & Mike Schiff	October 2, 2007	102
Joel thinks that his girlfriend is embarrassed to tell her friends that she is dating a caveman.
3	"Nick Get Job"	John Blanchard	Al Higgins	October 9, 2007	103
Nick gets a job at Norskbild, a home improvement center, through Joel. But when Nick is quickly fired for being a terrible worker, he considers his firing to be a discriminatory act against him and immediately files a lawsuit against the company. Meanwhile, Andy scares a woman in an attempt to prove that he is not scary.
4	"The Cavewoman"	Linda Mendoza	Theresa Mulligan Rosenthal	October 16, 2007	105
Joel, Nick, and Andy visit a Fruitberry Frozen yogurt-shop, and Nick falls for the hot cavewoman, Heather, who works there.
5	"The Mascot"	Will Speck and Josh Gordon	Joe Lawson	October 23, 2007	104
Nick takes a job as a substitute teacher and discovers that the school's mascot is an offensive, stereotypical caveman — which leads him on a quest to have the mascot removed. Meanwhile, Andy's search for an accounting job comes to an end when Leslie hires him to balance her books. But he is torn about what to do when he discovers that Leslie has been dabbling in some creative financing for her lover that could both estrange her from her family and land.
6	"The Shaver"	Ken Whittingham	Jace Richdale	November 6, 2007	106
Joel gets a new Homo sapiens friend, Jake, but Nick suspects he's a Shaver, a caveman who shaves his body hair in order to pass himself off as a Homo sapiens. Meanwhile, Thorne is attracted to the beast in Andy.
7	"Rock Vote"	Millicent Shelton	Chris Kelly	November 13, 2007	108
Andy has people coming at him from two different directions: Nick and Joel want him to vote their way in the next election, while Thorne wants him to buy a gun after a burglary.
8	"Caveman Holiday"	Lee Shallat-Chemel	Chris Kelly	November 20, 2007	110
The boys are throwing a party because it is Long Night, a caveman holiday that remembers when the cavemen did not die in the coldest day in history.
9	"Nick Jerk, Andy Work"	Will Speck and Josh Gordon	Luvh Rakhe	Unaired (US)	107
Nick causes problems for Joel when his girlfriend Kate refuses to spend the night. Joel starts spending more time at her place and finds he would rather be with his roommates. In the end, Joel moves back home and they all make compromises to get along. Andy starts working for SodaCo and his coworkers find him rather annoying. The entire office is forced to go through a series of seminars starting with "boundary training" because of him. He figures out that they cannot fire him and continues to do all of the good-natured but annoying things that made everyone upset.
10	"Nick Sick"	Fred Savage	Scott Marder & Rob Rosell	Unaired (US); July 23, 2008 (AUS)	109
Nick goes to see the student health centre with paresthesia in his buttocks, where he is advised by the caveman doctor to exercise more. While there, he learns that his CRP is up but he is told not to worry. However, he does research on the internet and finds out it could be a sign of leukocytosis. Worried, he pretends to be Joel and uses his insurance to see an HMO, who tells him he has appendicitis and schedules him for an appendectomy. Meanwhile, Joel and Kate are having relationship troubles, with Kate using far-fetched excuses not to sleep with Joel and avoiding him. Their relationship has lasted three months, which is when Kate traditionally dumps her boyfriends. Joel's boss finds out about the surgery for Nick when the insurance calls, but believes it to be for Joel and so gives him time off. When Kate comes to break it off with Joel, she learns of his major surgery and rushes to the hospital where Joel, disgusted that she only came when she thought he was having surgery, breaks it off with her.
11	"Andy the Stand-Up"	Gail Mancuso	Jace Richdale	Unaired (US)	111
Andy participates in Nick's open mic night, and becomes famous for his character of a dumb caveman.
12	"Cave Kid"	Lee Shallat-Chemel	Peter Saji	Unaired (US)	112
Neighbors who adopt a cave kid ask Joel, Nick and Andy to be his mentor.
13	"Hunters & Gatherers"	John Blanchard	Joe Lawson	Unaired (US)	113
Joel runs into trouble when he parks in an executive's parking space. Nick competes with Maurice for the attention of his ex-girlfriend, Heather, after Maurice explains his own charm with women in terms of hunter and gatherer roles, classifying himself as a hunter and Nick as a gatherer.

=== Weekly ratings ===
In the following summary, rating is the percentage of all households with televisions that tuned to the show, and "share" is the percentage of all televisions in use at that time that are tuned in.

Unless otherwise cited, the overnight rating and share information comes from Zap2It The following week, the Nielsen numbers from TVWeek.com. Additional ratings information, including the 18–49 rating, comes from BroadcastingCable and finally weekly overall ratings come from ABC Medianet

#	Title	Air Date	Rating	Share	18-49	Viewers	Rank (Timeslot)	Rank (Overall)
1	"Her Embarrassed of Caveman"	October 2, 2007	6.1	10	3.3/10	9.06	#1	#34
2	"Nick Get a Job"	October 9, 2007	4.5	8	2.5/8	6.96	#3	#59
3	"The Cavewoman"	October 16, 2007	4.6	8	2.7/8	6.92	#3	#64
4	"The Mascot"	October 23, 2007	4.5	7	2.2/6	6.55	#4	#71
5	"The Shaver"	November 6, 2007	3.4	5	1.7/5	5.51	#4	#83
6	"Rock Vote"	November 13, 2007	3.3	5	1.6/5	4.61	#4	#84

=== Seasonal ratings ===
Seasonal ratings based on average total viewers per episode of Cavemen on ABC:

Season	Time slot (EDT)	Season premiere	Season finale	TV season	Rank	Viewers (millions)
1	Tuesday 8:00 pm (October 2, 2007 – November 13, 2007)	October 2, 2007	November 13, 2007	2007–2008	#107	6.6

+ Information is current as of January 7, 2008.
