= GEICO Cavemen =

Trademarked advertising characters used by GEICO

The GEICO Cavemen are trademarked characters of the auto insurance company GEICO, used in a series of television advertisements that aired beginning in 2004. The campaign was created by Joe Lawson, Noel Ritter and Cody Spinadel while working at The Martin Agency. According to an episode of the public radio show 99% Invisible, "It's so easy a caveman could do it" was coined by Ritter. The inspiration for the campaign came from "Pastoralia", a short story by George Saunders, which revolves around a man and a woman, who work as "cave-people" for a failing theme park. In 2004, GEICO began an advertising campaign featuring Neanderthal-like cavemen in a modern setting. The premise of the commercials is that using GEICO's website is "so easy, a caveman could do it"; and that this slogan offends several cavemen, who not only still exist in modern society but live as intelligent, urbane bachelors. The first three GEICO commercials to feature cavemen were "Apartment", "Apology", and "Boom Mic".

Jeff Daniel Phillips and Ben Weber played the two earliest cavemen. Actor John Lehr appears most frequently as the caveman, while Ben Wilson has also portrayed one of the characters. The makeup effects for the cavemen include facial prosthetics, dental veneers, lace hairpieces, and body hair. They were designed and created by Tony Gardner and his special effects company Alterian, Inc. In an online interview with Esquire, Joe Lawson said that one aspect of the ads is a critique of modern political correctness.

The cavemen have been honored by the Madison Avenue Advertising Walk of Fame. The ABC TV show Cavemen is based on the commercials. In 2010, one of the cavemen was spotted filming a series of commercials in Homer, Alaska on the fishing boat FV Time Bandit from the television show The Deadliest Catch. During the shoot, the mayor of the city presented the caveman with a key to the city.

== Television sitcom spin-off ==
On March 2, 2007, Variety reported that a sitcom based on the cavemen characters, simply titled Cavemen, was being developed for ABC. The magazine reported, "'Cavemen' will revolve around three pre-historic men who must battle prejudice as they attempt to live as normal thirtysomethings in modern Atlanta." ABC announced this series for their fall schedule in May 2007. Originally it featured none of the cavemen from the commercials, but Jeff Daniel Phillips later agreed to join the cast. It premiered on October 2, 2007. In the face of sagging ratings and poor reviews from critics, it was quietly cancelled, automatically being the shortest-lived ABC sitcom of the season. In February 2008, a new series of Caveman commercials featured two of the characters spoofing the premise of the show.

== See also ==
- Neanderthals in popular culture
