= Heather Lind =

American actress

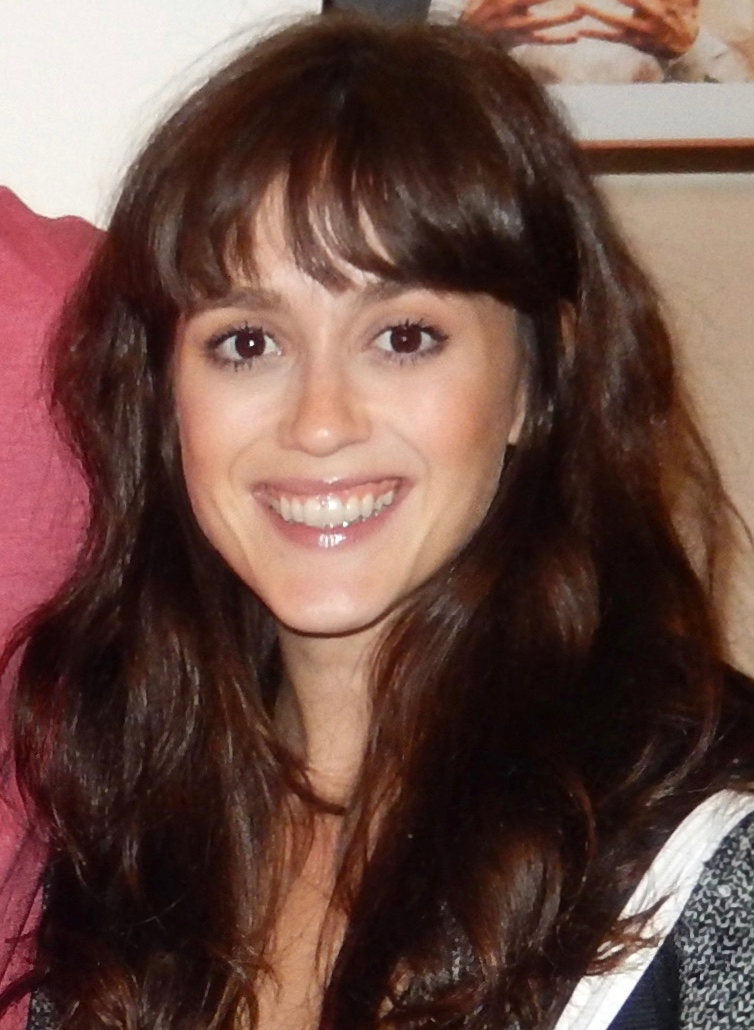
- Lind in 2015
- Born: 1983 or 1984 (age 42–43); Upland, Pennsylvania, U.S.
- Education: Fordham University (BA); New York University (MFA)
- Occupation: Actress

Heather Lind (born 1983 or 1984) is an American actress. She is known for her portrayal of Anna Strong in the AMC series Turn: Washington's Spies. She is the twin sister of actress Christina Bennett Lind.

== Early life and education ==
Lind was born in Upland, Pennsylvania, and was raised in Guilderland, New York. She earned her Bachelor of Arts in 2005 at Fordham University and her Master of Fine Arts in acting at New York University's Graduate Acting program.

== Career ==
Lind made her Broadway debut in the Shakespeare in the Park production The Merchant of Venice, in which she played Jessica, the daughter of Shylock, played by Al Pacino. She was awarded the 67th annual Theatre World Award for Outstanding Broadway or Off-Broadway Debut Performances during the 2010–2011 theatrical season.

In 2011, Lind played Katy, Margaret Thompson's maid, in the HBO series Boardwalk Empire.

She also narrates on the audiobook of Cassandra Clare's Clockwork Prince along with Ed Westwick.

== MeToo campaign ==
As part of the #MeToo campaign, in late October 2017, Lind accused former president George H. W. Bush of sexually assaulting her during a publicity photo for her series, Turn: Washington's Spies. Lind wrote in an Instagram post that Bush "sexually assaulted me while I was posing for a similar photo. He didn't shake my hand. He touched me from behind from his wheelchair with his wife Barbara Bush by his side. He told me a dirty joke. And then, all the while being photographed, touched me again." Lind later deleted her post.

Bush's spokesman responded, "at age 93, President Bush has been confined to a wheelchair for roughly five years, so his arm falls on the lower waist of people with whom he takes pictures. To try to put people at ease, the president routinely tells the same joke—and on occasion, he has patted women's rears in what he intended to be a good-natured manner. Some have seen it as innocent; others clearly view it as inappropriate. To anyone he has offended, President Bush apologizes most sincerely."

== Filmography ==
=== Film ===
Year	Title	Role	Notes
2012	The Last Day of August	Shannon	
2013	A Single Shot	Mincy	
2013	The Weekend	Victoire	
2013	Guest House		Short film
2013	37	Kitty Genovese	Short film
2015	Mistress America	Mamie-Claire	
2015	Stealing Cars	Nurse Simms	
2015	Demolition	Julia	
2016	Half the Perfect World	Lily	
2017	Fireworkers	Gibson	
2017	Rufus	Jane	Short film
2017	Supermarket	Jasmine	Short film

=== Television ===
Year	Title	Role	Notes
2011	Blue Bloods	Melissa Samuels	"Hall of Mirrors"
2011–2012	Boardwalk Empire	Katy	Recurring role
2014	Sleepy Hollow	Mary Wells	"The Weeping Lady"
2015	The Walker		"What Being a Celebrity Escort Is Like"
2014–2017	Turn: Washington's Spies	Anna Strong	Main role
2018	The Good Fight	Carine Minter	"Day 450"
2019	Evil	Sarah McCrystal	"Rose390"
2020	Prodigal Son	Alessa	"Stranger Beside You"
2022	Pantheon	Laurie Lowell	Voice role
2024–present	Your Friends & Neighbors	Kat Resnick	Recurring Role
