= Tea Peter =

- Family Guy episode
- Episode no.: Season 10; Episode 21
- Directed by: Pete Michels
- Written by: Patrick Meighan
- Production code: 9ACX18
- Original air date: May 13, 2012

Guest appearances
- Kirker Butler as Various; Chris Cox as Male silhouette; Ralph Garman as Various; Ari Graynor as Female silhouette; Alexa Ray Joel as Young girl; Wendee Lee as Korean girl; Christine Lakin as Joyce Kinney; Julius Sharpe as Crowd member; Tara Strong as Japanese girl; Nicole Sullivan as Woman; Fred Tatasciore as Priest; Uncredited: Alexandra Breckenridge as Girl talking key

Episode chronology
← Previous "Leggo My Meg-O"	Next → "Family Guy Viewer Mail #2"
- Family Guy season 10

"Tea Peter" is the twenty-first episode of the tenth season of the animated television series Family Guy, and the 186th episode overall. The episode originally aired on Fox in the United States on May 13, 2012. In this episode, Peter joins the Tea Party movement and, along with his father-in-law, Carter, successfully shuts down the government. However, things do not turn out as expected, and Peter has to find a way to make things the way they were.

The episode was written by Patrick Meighan and directed by Pete Michels. It received mixed reviews from critics for its storyline and cultural references. It was viewed by 4.94 million viewers, according to Nielsen ratings. The episode features guest performances from Kirker Butler, Chris Cox, Ralph Garman, Ari Graynor, Alexa Ray Joel, Wendee Lee, Christine Lakin, Tara Strong, Nicole Sullivan, Julius Sharpe, and Fred Tatasciore, along with several guest performers for the series.

== Plot ==
At the grand re-opening of Goldman's Pharmacy (after it was burned down to collect on insurance in the episode "Burning Down the Bayit"), Peter finds a "come in, we're open" sign on the front door, and decides to buy one, nailing it to his front door. After people mistake the sign as a business, Peter decides to go into business for himself, but Joe has to shut him down for not having a license. After fighting City Hall and losing, Peter finds a sympathetic ear in Quagmire when they see a news report about the Tea Party and decide to join, much to the dismay of Brian, who informs him that the Tea Party is really a tool of big business.

Joe tags along with Peter and Quagmire to a rally where Peter's father-in-law, Carter, is posing as an everyday worker named "Joe Workingman". Following the rally, Peter stops inside to use the restroom, where he finds Carter. After he manages to convince Peter that he and the "Joe Workingman" persona are separate, Carter enlists Peter to help get rid of the government. Despite the family's resistance, Peter makes calls for Carter on behalf of the Tea Party and successfully campaigns to have Mayor West shut down Quahog's government. The citizens of Quahog celebrate their new freedom from government, getting away with many things, from Quagmire marrying and impregnating a giraffe and flatly telling that the giraffe's son is not his, to Chris taking Mescaline and going to Las Vegas in the midst of a hallucination (referencing Fear and Loathing in Las Vegas).

However, Brian makes the Griffins aware that Carter is now polluting the city at will, and as time goes on (five days after the government closure), things get worse, up to the point where basic services (such as electricity and water) are completely inaccessible and the citizens start rioting in the streets. After visiting Carter for help and getting turned down by him, Peter calls the town together. He delivers a heartfelt speech about the government, although he manages to present it as an "entirely new thing". After convincing the citizens to successfully reform the government, Peter looks on the Internet to see what people are saying about him, only to be disappointed by the result.

== Production and cultural references ==
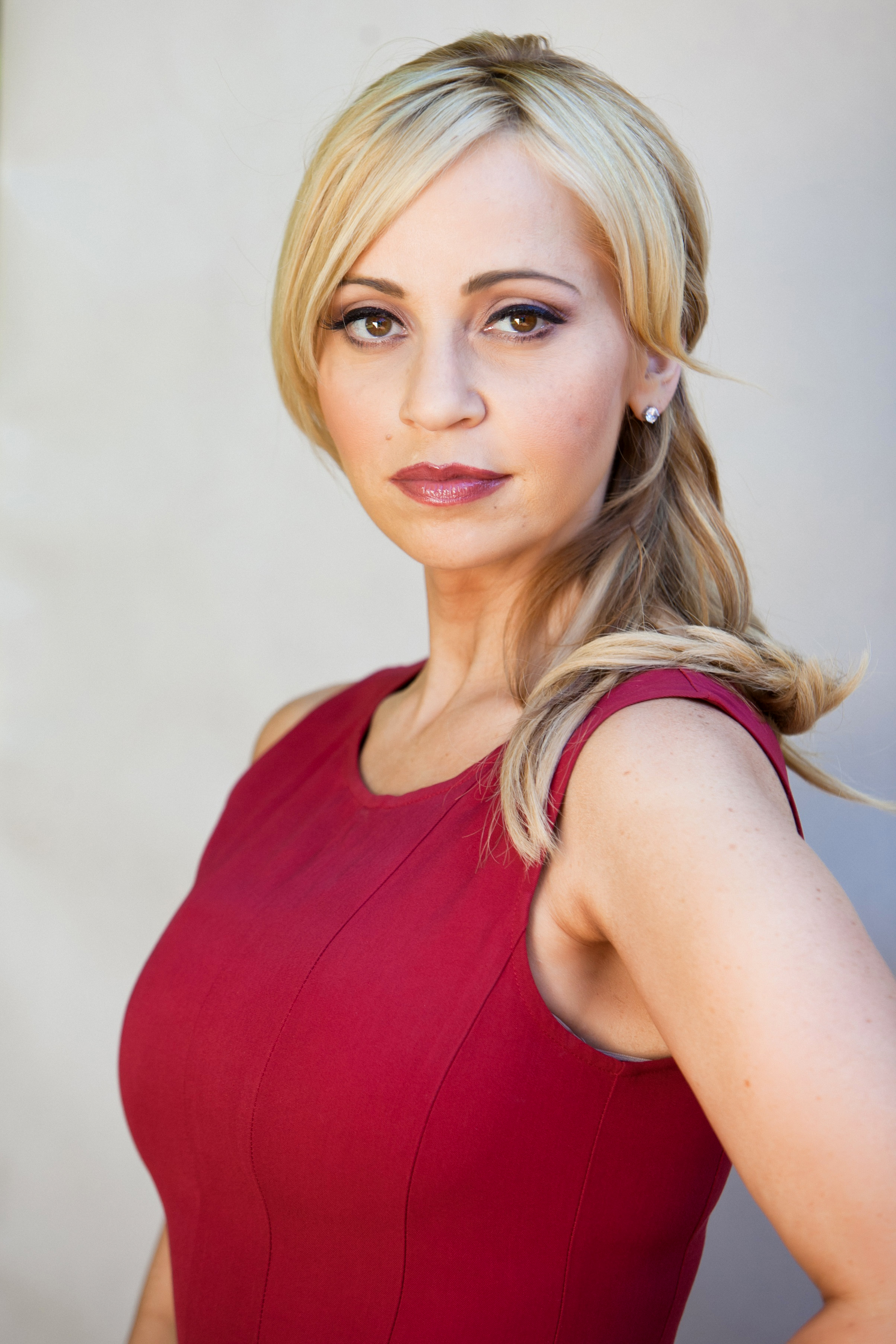
Tara Strong guest starred in this episode

"Tea Peter" was written by Patrick Meighan and directed by Pete Michels. Series regular Peter Shin serves as a supervising animation producer, with James Purdum and Dominic Bianchi as supervising directors, and Andrew Goldberg and Alex Carter as executive story editors.

In addition to the regular cast, ex-Family Guy writer Kirker Butler, voice actor Chris Cox, voice actor Ralph Garman, actress Ari Graynor, actress Alexa Ray Joel, voice actress Christine Lakin, voice actress Tara Strong, voice actress Nicole Sullivan, writer Julius Sharpe, and voice actor Fred Tatasciore guest starred in the episode. Recurring guest voice actors Johnny Brennan, writer Steve Callaghan, writer Mark Hentemann, writer Patrick Meighan, writer Danny Smith, writer Alec Sulkin, and writer John Viener made minor performances throughout the episode. Recurring guest cast members Adam West and Patrick Warburton also appeared in the episode, portraying the characters of Mayor West and Joe Swanson, respectively.

Some cultural references were used in this episode. Peter joins the Tea Party, which is a reference to the Tea Party movement. At the Tea Party rally, Peter can be heard yelling "We are Marshall!", which is a reference to the film of the same name.

== Reception ==
In its original broadcast on May 13, 2012, "Tea Peter" was watched by 4.94 million viewers, according to Nielsen ratings, despite airing simultaneously with Celebrity Apprentice on NBC and the series finale of Desperate Housewives on ABC. It also acquired a 2.4/6 rating in the 18–49 demographic group, losing to Desperate Housewives but beating Celebrity Apprentice. The ratings fell from the previous episode, "Leggo My Meg-O".

The episode received mixed reviews. Kevin McFarland of The A.V. Club gave a C+ rating. He stated that "the thin plot arc didn't do much for [him]", however praising the "cutaways which made [him] laugh". He also noted that "[the episode] seems to believe that every follower of the Tea Party movement would propose exactly the same type of government in place now once mass lawlessness overtook the land by following their proposed ideas". He continued, "I didn't buy that final step, but it was the only bit of irony in the entire plot, and I appreciate whenever Family Guy goes for satire with a bit of meaning instead of shouting distilled vitriol for its perceived opponents from a soapbox." Carter Doston of TV Fanatic gave a 2.7/5 rating. He criticized the lack of comedy used, "Seth MacFarlane is a noted liberal, and the politics of the show follow the same track, so an episode mocking the rise of this provocative conservative political movement was inevitable. The problem is that the show forgot to make it funny." He also said "this episode did nothing more than state the obvious, and in a way that was neither profound nor at the very least entertaining."
