= The Last Day of August =

The Last Day of August is a 2012 American film drama about four friends recovering from the physical and psychological damage of a car accident. An independent feature film, it was directed by Craig DiFolco with a screenplay written by DiFolco and Sara Rempe. It was the debut film of the writers and the director. Its running time is 75 minutes.

== Plot ==
A year after being paralyzed in a car accident, thirty-year-old Dan, struggling with his recovery, relocates to his family's cabin in upstate New York. Several of his best friends visit him there on the last day of August to challenge his decision to become a recluse and other self-destructive behavior patterns. Each of them contrives to balance concern for his psychological well-being with insistence that Dan re-examine his response to his physical condition.

== Characters ==
Actor	Role
Sebastian Arcelus	Mark
Bill English	Chris
Rhett Henckel	Roddy
Michael Izquierdo	Dan
Heather Lind	Shannon
Vanessa Ray	Phoebe
Julie Sharbutt	Erin
Lauren Worsham	Lisa

== Release ==
The Last Days of August was an official selection for several festivals in the fall of 2012, including the Gotham Screen International Film Festival, the New Hampshire Film Festival, and the Big Apple Film Festival.

In October 2012, the Best Actor (in a) Film Festival named Izquierdo Best Actor in the Festival for his work in The Last Day of August and gave the award for Best Actor in a Feature Drama to three of the film's leads: Izquiedo, Arcelus, and Lind.
