= Princess Catherine Ivanovna of Russia =

Catherine Ioannovna Romanoff
- Princess of the Imperial Blood; Marchioness of Villaforesta
- Born: 12 July 1915; Pavlovsk Palace, Saint Petersburg, Russian Empire
- Died: 13 March 2007 (aged 91); Montevideo, Uruguay
- Spouse: Ruggero Farace, Marquess of Villaforesta (m. 1937; died 1970)
- Issue Detail: Nicoletta Farace; Fiammetta Farace; Giovanni Farace, Marquess of Villaforesta
Names
- Yekaterina Ioannovna Romanova
- House: Holstein-Gottorp-Romanov
- Father: Prince Ioann Konstantinovich of Russia
- Mother: Princess Helen of Serbia

Princess of the Imperial Blood Catherine Ioannovna of Russia (Russian: Княжна императорской крови Екатери́на Ива́нновна; 12 July 1915 (O.S.) – 13 March 2007) was a great-great-granddaughter of Tsar Nicholas I of Russia and a niece of King Alexander I of Yugoslavia. She was the last member of the Imperial Family born before the fall of the dynasty. She was also a second cousin of Prince Philip, Duke of Edinburgh, as Catherine's grandfather Grand Duke Konstantin Konstantinovich of Russia was the younger brother of Prince Philip's grandmother Olga, Queen of Greece. Her relation to Prince Philip makes her a second cousin, once removed of King Charles III of the United Kingdom. She is also the grandmother of actor Sebastian Arcelus.

== Life ==
Born in Pavlovsk Palace, she was the second child of Prince John Konstantinovich of Russia and Princess Helen of Serbia. After the Revolution, her father was arrested and deported from the capital and her mother followed her husband into exile. Catherine and her brother, Vsevolod, remained in the care of her grandmother, the Grand Duchess Elizaveta Mavriekievna of Russia. On 18 July 1918, their father, Prince John, was killed, and their mother, Princess Helena, was arrested and spent several months in Soviet prisons. Grand Duchess Elizabeth was able to take Catherine and her brother to Sweden. Sometime later, they were reunited with their mother.

The family lived in Yugoslavia, then moved to Nice, France (where her mother stayed) and later to England. There, Catherine received an excellent education, although she never learned the Russian language because her mother, devastated by her husband's death, did not want her children speaking that language in front of her.

== Marriage ==
From 1937 to 1945, Princess Catherine Ivanovna lived in Italy, with her great-aunt Queen Elena. During her stay she married an Italian diplomat Ruggero Farace, Marchese di Villaforesta (4 August 1909 - 14 September 1970), in Rome on 15 September 1937; on the occasion of her wedding, she renounced her succession rights to the Russian throne.

== Farace di Villaforesta family ==
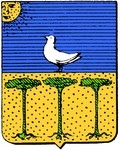
Coat of arms of Farace di Villaforesta family

Marchese Ruggero Farace Farace di Villaforesta was the son of Alfredo, Marchese Farace di Villaforesta, member of an old Sicilian noble family and Greek aristocrat Caterina Fachiri.

Through mutual descent from the Princes of Mavrocordato Ruggero was distantly related to Queen Natalia of Serbia, Princess Aspasia of Greece and Denmark (1896–1972) and her daughter Queen Alexandra of Yugoslavia, who was married to his wife's first cousin, King Peter II of Yugoslavia.

Ruggero had one younger brother, Don Alessandro Alfredo dei Marchesi Farace di Villaforesta, and one younger sister, Donna Lydia dei Marchesi Farace di Villaforesta. Donna Lydia married a writer, Count Giovanni Turgi Prosperi de' Serconforti, who published an autobiographical novel, Una bellissima mamà (1983).

== Children ==
They had three children:

- Nobile Nicoletta Farace (b. Rome, Italy, 23 July 1938); married on 25 March 1966 to Alberto Grundland. They had two children:
  - Eduardo Alberto Grundland (b. 15 January 1967); married on 15 November 1999 to Maria Ester Pita Blanco and had one son.
  - Alexandra Gabriella Grundland (b. 17 September 1971); married on 24 March 2001 to Roberto Castro Padula and had one son.
- Nobile Fiammetta Farace (b. Budapest, Hungary, 19 February 1940); married firstly on 16 September 1969 to Victor Carlos Arcelus (divorced in 1980) and secondly in 1981 to Nelson Zanelli. She had three children:
  - Victor John Arcelus (b. 24 November 1973).
  - Sebastian Carlos Arcelus (b. 5 November 1976), married on 16 October 2007 to Stephanie Janette Block and had one daughter.
  - Alessandro Zanelli (b. 31 July 1984).
- Giovanni Farace, Marchese Farace di Villaforesta (b. Rome, Italy, 20 October 1943); married on 14 February 1968 to Marie-Claude Tillier-Debesse (b. Paris, 1944) and had two sons:
  - Alessandro Farace di Villaforesta (b. 29 August 1971).
  - Yann Farace di Villaforesta (b. 4 October 1974); married on 4 September 2009 to Anne-Sophie Laignel and had one son:
    - Tancredi Farace di Villaforesta (b. Bruxelles, Belgium, 20 November 2010)

== Later life ==
In 1945, after the end of World War II, Princess Catherine separated from her husband (although they never legally divorced) and moved with her children to South America. In later years, she lived in Montevideo, capital city of Uruguay.

== Death ==
She died on 13 March 2007 in Montevideo, Uruguay.

== Honours ==
- (Russian Empire) House of Romanov: Dame Grand Cordon of the Imperial Order of Saint Catherine.

== Ancestry ==
Ancestors of Princess Catherine Ivanovna of Russia

8. Grand Duke Konstantin Nikolayevich of Russia
4. Grand Duke Konstantin Konstantinovich of Russia
9. Princess Alexandra of Saxe-Altenburg
2. Prince John Constantinovich of Russia
10. Prince Moritz of Saxe-Altenburg
5. Princess Elisabeth of Saxe-Altenburg
11. Princess Augusta of Saxe-Meiningen
1. Princess Catherine Ivanovna of Russia
12. Alexander Karađorđević, Prince of Serbia
6. Peter I of Serbia
13. Persida Nenadović
3. Princess Helen of Serbia
14. Nicholas I of Montenegro
7. Princess Zorka of Montenegro
15. Milena Vukotić

== Bibliography ==
- Grigoryan, V. G. (2007). Romanov Biographical Directory (in Russian). Moscow: AST.
- Dumin, S. V. (1998). Romanovy: imperatorskiĭ dom v izgnanii [Romanovs: the Imperial House in Exile] (in Russian). Moscow: M. Zakharov-ACT. ISBN 978-5-81590-006-6.
- Pchelov, E.V. (2004). Romanovy: istorii︠a︡ dinastii [Romanov: The History of the Dynasty] (in Russian). Moscow: Olma Press. ISBN 978-5-22401-678-5.
- Prince Gabriel Constantinovich (2009). Memories in the Marble Palace. Pickering, Ontario: Gilbert's Books. ISBN 978-0-97378-399-5.
