= Sebastian Arcelus =

American actor (born 1976)

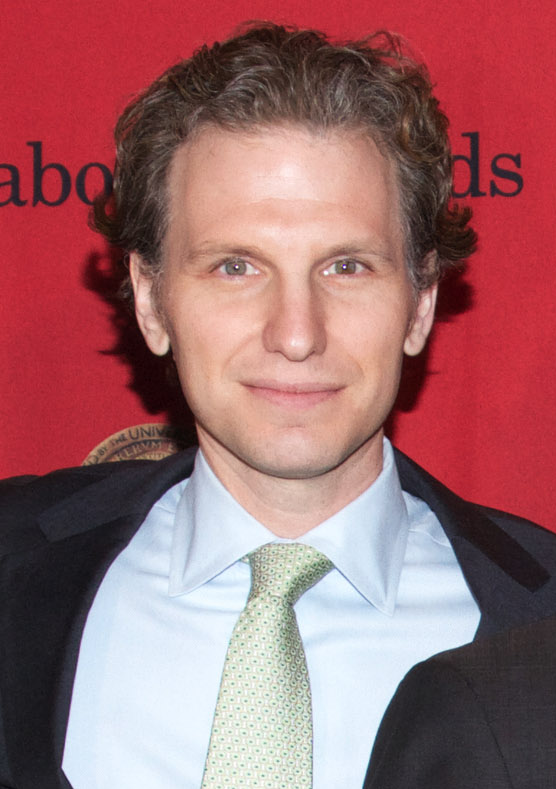
- Arcelus in May 2014
- Born: November 5, 1976 (age 49); New York City, U.S.
- Education: Williams College
- Occupation: Actor
- Years active: 1999–present
- Known for: House of Cards, Madam Secretary, Rent, Wicked, Elf, Into the Woods
- Spouse: Stephanie J. Block (m. 2007)
- Children: 1
- Relatives: Princess Catherine Ivanovna of Russia (grandmother)

Sebastian Arcelus (born November 5, 1976) is an American actor, best known for his roles as Lucas Goodwin on the Netflix thriller series House of Cards (2013–2016) and Jay Whitman on the CBS political drama series Madam Secretary (2014–2019). Arcelus began his acting career in the early 2000s and spent the first decade of his career on Broadway, having played Roger in Rent, Fiyero in Wicked, Bob Gaudio in Jersey Boys, and Buddy in Elf, among other roles. He returned to Broadway with the 2022 revival of Into the Woods and its subsequent national tour.

== Early life and background ==
Arcelus was born in New York City and grew up in Port Washington, New York. He is a second generation American of Uruguayan, Italian, and Russian descent, and speaks Spanish fluently. His grandmother was Princess Catherine Ivanovna of Russia, and he has stated he is a distant relative ("my cousins nine times removed") of Princes William and Harry of the United Kingdom. He is a graduate of Williams College.

== Career ==
=== 1999–2011: Early career and Broadway ===
Arcelus has made a career in theater on Broadway, regionally, and internationally. He began his career in the early 2000s, and spent three years working at an international business firm while auditioning and performing in amateur theater at night. He performed in a handful of small New York theater productions as well as regional productions like that of The Who's Tommy in Newark, New Jersey in 2000 and Big River in Portsmouth, New Hampshire. He joined the repertory theater company of Weathervane Theatre in Whitefield, New Hampshire, for their 2001 season; at Weathervane, he performed in productions including Floyd Collins, Cabaret, and I Love You, You're Perfect, Now Change. Following this experience he took part in a bilingual production of West Side Story in Guatemala.

Arcelus made his Broadway debut in 2002 in Rent, first as a swing, covering the male ensemble roles as well as Mark and Roger, and then as Roger throughout the first half of 2003. He remained with Rent as a swing until Fall 2004.

Some of his first professional screen acting roles were for English-language dubs of animated TV shows. He continued to do this throughout the 2000s and voiced characters in shows including Winx Club and multiple series within the Yu-Gi-Oh! franchise. In 2004, Arcelus appeared in the movie musical Temptation, with Broadway stars Alice Ripley, Adam Pascal, and Zoe Saldaña, among many others.

During the spring of 2005, he starred as Jan in the original cast of the Beach Boys musical, Good Vibrations. He played Fiyero on the first national tour of Wicked from January 3 until October 3, 2006. He then reprised the role of Fiyero in the Broadway production from January 9 to December 16, 2007. Arcelus was featured on iChannel, an interactive 2006 web-series about "a self-conscious young man who finds his life taken over by a video blog."

He starred as Bob Gaudio in the Broadway production of Jersey Boys from January 10, 2008, to January 11, 2009. before starring in Happiness, a musical which ran Off-Broadway at Lincoln Center Theater's Mitzi E. Newhouse Theater for fourteen weeks beginning on February 27, 2009. He resumed the role of Bob Gaudio in the Broadway production of Jersey Boys on July 14, 2009, and finished the role on October 10, 2010.

He originated the role of Buddy in Elf the Musical for a limited engagement run from November 10, 2010, through January 2, 2011, at Broadway's Al Hirschfeld Theater.

He assumed the role of Jack Chesney in Where's Charley? in a concert production as part of New York City Center's Encores! series from March 17–20, 2011. From May 6 through June 19, 2011, took part in the original stage production of A Time to Kill, premiering at the Arena Stage in Washington, D.C., based on the John Grisham novel of the same name; Arcelus originated the role of Jake Brigance. Later that summer, Arcelus filmed and helped produce the independent feature film The Last Day of August, which premiered in October 2012. In November 2011, Arcelus starred in an off-Broadway limited engagement musical production of The Blue Flower at Second Stage, along with Marc Kudisch and Teal Wicks.

Arcelus in 2008

=== 2012–present: Madam Secretary and Into the Woods ===
In 2012, Arcelus starred in the independent film The Last Day of August. Later that year, he was cast as Lucas Goodwin in the Netflix TV series House of Cards. From 2013 to 2016, he had a recurring role in the show's first, second, and fourth seasons. In 2013, Arcelus reprised his role of Jake Brigance in the Broadway production of A Time To Kill at the Golden Theatre in New York City, which premiered on October 20, 2013.

As part of the collective The Grundleshotz, Arcelus co-wrote the musical Gettin' the Band Back Together. Following four years of improvisational rehearsals, the musical debuted regionally in 2013 at the George Street Playhouse in New Jersey before receiving a pre-Broadway workshop in 2014. The musical played on Broadway at the Belasco Theatre during Summer 2018.

In early 2014, he was cast in the Cinemax pilot Blanco. Soon after, he also joined the cast The Best of Me, based on the Nicholas Sparks novel of the same name.

In 2014, he began portraying Jay Whitman on the CBS drama Madam Secretary. After having a recurring role during the first two seasons of the show, Arcelus became part of the main cast for the final four seasons of the show; he acted in one hundred episodes before the series concluded in December 2019.

Since 2014, Arcelus has also had small roles in the films Ted 2 (2015) and Split (2016), as well as guest roles in shows including The Leftovers, FBI, and Bull. He joined the cast of the Steve McQueen miniseries Codes of Conduct, which was given a limited series order by HBO in 2015. The project was ultimately scrapped by the network the following year. In 2016, Arcelus had a six-episode arc in HBO's The Deuce.

In August 2022, it was announced that Arcelus would return to Broadway by replacing Brian d'Arcy James as the Baker in the revival of Into the Woods beginning September 6 and that he would star alongside his wife Stephanie J. Block who plays the Baker's Wife. He played his final performance on October 23, 2022. In December 2022, it was announced that Arcelus and Block would reprise their roles in the production's U.S. national tour, which launched in early 2023. During the same month, it was announced that Arcelus would also return to the Broadway production beginning January 3, 2023, and continue with the show through its final performance on January 8.

== Personal life ==
Arcelus married his Wicked co-star Stephanie J. Block in 2007. Block played Elphaba in Wicked, both on the national tour and on Broadway. Their daughter Vivienne Helena Arcelus was born on January 19, 2015.

== Acting credits ==
=== Film ===
| Year | Title | Role | Notes |
|---|---|---|---|
| 2012 | The Last Day of August | Mark | Also producer |
| 2014 | The Best of Me | Frank | |
| 2015 | Ted 2 | Dr. Ed Danzer | |
| 2016 | Split | Mr. Cooke | |

=== Television ===
| Year | Title | Role | Notes |
|---|---|---|---|
| 2011 | Person of Interest | Matthews | Episode: 1x05 "Judgemet" |
| 2013–14, 2016 | House of Cards | Lucas Goodwin | Recurring (Season 1–2, 4); 17 episodes |
| 2014 | Blanco | Andy Silver | TV pilot |
| 2014 | It Could Be Worse | Howard | 2 episodes |
| 2014 | The Leftovers | Doug Durst | 2 episodes |
| 2014–2019 | Madam Secretary | Jay Whitman | Recurring (Season 1–2); Main cast (Season 3–6); 100 episodes |
| 2015 | Codes of Conduct | Simon | TV pilot |
| 2018 | The Deuce | Dave Hiller | 6 episodes |
| 2019 | FBI | Drew Harper | Episode: 2x02 "The Lives of Others" |
| 2019 | Bull | Eric Crawford | Episode: 4x08 "Safe and Sound" |
| 2025 | FBI: Most Wanted | Dr. Conrad Kagan | Episode: 6x15 "Four Bodies" |
| 2026 | Dutton Ranch | Giles Moore | Episode: 1x3 "Act of God Business" |

=== Voiceover and English-language dubbing ===
| Year | Title | Role | Notes |
|---|---|---|---|
| 2001–2004 | Yu-Gi-Oh! | Espa Roba, Rex Raptor | 9 episodes |
| 2001 | Pokémon: The Legend of Thunder | Vincent | TV miniseries |
| 2001–2002 | Shaman King | Yoh Asakura / Zeke Asakura | |
| 2002 | Seven of Seven | Mutsumi | |
| 2002–2003 | Ultimate Muscle | Road Rage / Additional Voices | |
| 2003 | Samurai Deeper Kyo | Hotaru | |
| 2004 | Gokusen | Youichi Minami | |
| 2004 | Phoenix | Adam | |
| 2004 | Yu-Gi-Oh! The Movie: Pyramid of Light | Additional voices | TV movie |
| 2004 | Shrine of the Morning Mist | Tadahiro Amatsu | |
| 2004 | Pokémon: Destiny Deoxys | Rafe | TV movie |
| 2004–2007 | Winx Club (4Kids edit) | Timmy/Palladium | 78 episodes |
| 2005–2010 | Go, Diego, Go! | Papi/Additional voices | 13 episodes |
| 2005–2012 | Dora the Explorer | Various voices | |
| 2006–2007 | G.I. Joe: Sigma Six | Tunnel Rat | Succeeded Michael Sinterniklaas as Tunnel Rat |
| 2007 | Yu-Gi-Oh! GX | Marcel (Martin Kanou) | |
| 2007 | Dinosaur King | Rex Ancient (Rex Owen) | |
| 2008 | Man of the People | Little G / Miscellaneous | |
| 2009 | Turtles Forever | '87 Raphael | TV movie |
| 2014 | Dora and Friends: Into the City! | Various voices | |

=== Theater credits ===
| Year | Title | Role | Venue | Notes |
|---|---|---|---|---|
| 2001 | Floyd Collins | Homer Collins | Weathervane Theatre: July – August 2001 | Regional revival |
| 2002–2004 | Rent | Swing; Understudy: Mark, Roger | Nederlander Theatre: May 2002 – Dec. 2002 | Broadway replacement |
| 2002–2004 | Rent | Roger | Nederlander Theatre: Dec 2002 – June 2003 | Broadway replacement |
| 2002–2004 | Rent | Swing; Understudy: Mark, Roger | Nederlander Theatre: July 2003– Nov. 2004 | Broadway replacement |
| 2004 | Caligula | Germanicus | Theatre at St. Clements: Sept. – Oct. 2004 | New York Musical Theatre Festival production |
| 2004–2005 | Good Vibrations | Jan / Ensemble | Eugene O'Neill Theatre: Nov. 2004 – Apr. 2005 | Original Broadway cast |
| 2005 | The Full Monty | Ethan Girard | North Shore Music Theatre: November 2005 | Regional revival |
| 2006–2007 | Wicked | Fiyero Tigelaar | National tour: Jan. – Oct. 2006 | National tour replacement |
| 2006–2007 | Wicked | Fiyero Tigelaar | Gershwin Theatre: Jan. – Dec. 2007 | Broadway replacement |
| 2008–2010 | Jersey Boys | Bob Gaudio | August Wilson Theatre: Jan. 2008 – Jan. 2009 | Broadway replacement |
| 2008–2010 | Jersey Boys | Bob Gaudio | August Wilson Theatre: Jul. 2009 – Oct. 2010 | Broadway replacement |
| 2009 | Happiness | Zach | Newhouse Theater: Feb. – Jun. 2009 | Original Off-Broadway cast |
| 2010–2011 | Elf | Buddy | Al Hirschfeld Theatre: Nov. 2010 – Jan. 2011 | Original Broadway cast |
| 2011 | Where's Charley? | Jack Chesney | New York City Center: March 2011 | Encores! Off-Broadway revival |
| 2011 | A Time to Kill | Jake Brigance | Arena Stage: May - June 2011 | Pre-Broadway Tryout |
| 2011 | The Blue Flower | Franz | Second Stage Theater: Oct. – Nov. 2011 | Original Off-Broadway cast |
| 2013 | A Time to Kill | Jake Brigance | John Golden Theatre: Oct. – Nov. 2013 | Original Broadway cast |
| 2022–2023 | Into the Woods | The Baker | St. James Theatre: Sept. – Oct. 2022 Jan. 2023 | Broadway replacement |
| 2022–2023 | Into the Woods | The Baker | The U.S. National Tour: Feb. – July 2023 | Ten city engagement |
