= Knust (surname) =

Knust is a surname of German origin. Notable people with the surname include:

- Juliana Knust (born 1981), Brazilian actress
- Peter Knust (born 1960), German swimmer
