= Bill English (actor) =

American actor

- Occupation: Actor

Bill English is an actor. He is known as playing the role of Joel in the ABC television series Cavemen.

== Early life and education ==
English was raised Honeoye Falls, New York, a small village outside of Rochester, New York.

He is a graduate of the North Carolina School of the Arts.

== Career ==
English has performed on Broadway with Anne Heche and Alec Baldwin in 20th Century. In February 2012, he took over the lead role of Billy Crocker in the 2011 revival of Anything Goes.

He starred in Cavemen in 2007 and had guest roles on Melrose Place (CW), Person of Interest (CBS) among others.

English had the role of Chris in the 2012 film The Last Day of August.
