= Family Guy Viewer Mail 2 =

"Family Guy Viewer Mail #2"
- Family Guy episode
- Episode no.: Season 10; Episode 22
- Directed by: Greg Colton
- Written by: Tom Devanney (Chap of the Manor); Alec Sulkin (Fatman and Robin); Deepak Sethi (Point of Stew)
- Production code: 9ACX19
- Original air date: May 20, 2012

Guest appearances
- Cate Blanchett as Queen Elizabeth II; Max Burkholder as child; John Finnemore as various; Colin Ford as child; Ioan Gruffudd as Prince Charles; Tom Hollander as contestant and television announcer; Rachael MacFarlane as various; Chris O'Dowd as guard and contestant; Jeff Ross as himself; Joshua Rush as various

Episode chronology
← Previous "Tea Peter"	Next → "Internal Affairs"
- Family Guy season 10

"Family Guy Viewer Mail #2" is the twenty-second and penultimate episode of the tenth season of the animated comedy series Family Guy, and the 187th episode overall. The episode originally aired with the succeeding episode, "Internal Affairs", on Fox in the United States on May 20, 2012.

In the episode, Brian and Stewie respond to viewer mail. Three segments respectively feature a British version of Family Guy, Peter Griffin turning everybody he touches into Robin Williams, and a typical day from Stewie's point of view. The episode is a sequel to the first viewer mail episode in the show's third season.

The episode was written by Tom Devanney, Alec Sulkin and Deepak Sethi and directed by Greg Colton. It received mixed reviews for its storyline and cultural references, the more positive reviews going to the "Chap of the Manor" and "Point of Stew" segments, while the "Fatman and Robin" segment received less positive reviews. This episode features guest performances by Cate Blanchett, Max Burkholder, John Finnemore, Colin Ford, Ioan Gruffudd, Tom Hollander, Rachael MacFarlane, Chris O'Dowd, Jeff Ross, and Joshua Rush, along with several recurring guest performers for the series. The episode was dedicated to musician Warren Luening, who died before this episode aired.

== Plot ==
Just like the first viewer mail episode, Brian and Stewie read their mail from viewers and tell three stories.

=== "Chap of the Manor" ===
The episode uses the premise that Family Guy is based on a British television show. The characters from Family Guy are all presented as stereotypical English people, apart from Stewie, who is a devoutly religious redneck with a hillbilly accent, as he already has an English accent in the main show. Brian is also an effeminate horse.

In this British version of the series, Neville (Peter) states that he is going to the pub to meet his friends, much to Lydia's (Lois) irritation. When the news announces that Queen Elizabeth II will be in the parade, Neville tells his friends that he is related to the Queen (due to him misinterpreting his nana say she was in a bad marriage with a "bloody" duke, when it was just blood in her stool) and wishes to gain a lock of the Queen's hair to test it. When the Queen passes by, he tries to set up a fake barber chair along the route. When this fails to gain the Queen's attention twice, Neville and Collingsworth (Chris) steal a police motorcycle and chase the Queen to her death in a tunnel. As Neville and Collingsworth try to nonchalantly walk away, they are chased by a cohort of London Bobbies to the tune of "Yakety Sax". Back home, Neville discovers they are not related to the Queen after all.

=== "Fatman and Robin" ===
While Peter is watching a roast of his favorite stand-up comedian Robin Williams on Comedy Central, he feels offended when insult comic Jeff Ross insults Williams. Peter runs outside in the middle of a thunderstorm and accuses God of hating Williams, wishing that everyone were Williams before getting struck by lightning. Upon waking up in the hospital, he discovers he has gained the ability to turn everyone and everything he touches into Williams (similar to the Midas Touch). Peter turns everyone in the city into Robin Williams (while "Rockin' Robin" is played). At first, this goes well for Peter, but soon the clones become too much for him, especially after he accidentally turns Lois into one. After numerous suicide attempts which fail because everything he touches turns into Williams, he orders all the clones to venture into the world to make others laugh but chooses five of them to play-act as his family members. The story ends showing that Peter is (seemingly) going insane and has cut both his hands off, a solution that prevents him from turning anyone or anything else into a clone. Stewie was the only one who didn't transform, as he mimicked Williams to make Peter think he was a clone, and at the end of the scene he is shown on the roof suggesting that Disney did not let the show portray Williams' role as the Genie from Aladdin.

=== "Point of Stew" ===
The audience sees the world through Stewie's eyes as Lois changes him, Meg wishes him to keep her ring (Stewie stating this is a "Red Flag"), and his friends ask him to go down the slide at the playground (doing a reference to the film National Lampoon's Vacation in the process). Later, Stewie secures a Twinkie to stuff in Brian's tail pipe on his car but ends up going for an unexpected ride with Brian where he chases a squirrel in his car and kills it. He then spots Herbert underneath a school bus. At bath time, he imagines a doll being eaten by a shark and Peter joins him. At bedtime, he makes a quick trip through time to stop Kurt Cobain from killing himself in 1994 by introducing him to Häagen-Dazs ice cream; on returning to the present he sees an obese Cobain on a 2012 album. As Lois reads a bedtime story about the town from Footloose, a drunken Peter rudely interrupts for sex as Stewie is forced to listen. In his dreams, he visualizes Peter and Lois, who are having sex in reality, as lumberjacks chopping down trees with axes, with Peter, cutting down his tree signifying the end of the sex, and Lois beginning to cut down hers with a chainsaw, representing her beginning to use a vibrator, to finish.

== Reception ==
The episode received a 2.6 rating and was watched by a total of 5.35 million people; this made it the most watched show on Animation Domination that night, beating The Cleveland Show, Bob's Burgers, and The Simpsons with 4.97 million. Kevin McFarland of The A.V. Club gave the episode a B with each segment getting an A−, C, and B−, respectively, saying ""Viewer Mail" is composed of three shorter stories, an opportunity to completely alter the structure of the show and tell a different kind of story. As far as the repetitive nature of Family Guy goes, at least this technique has a reasonable track record of success, so it's not all that surprising that the first segment in this anthology is one of the best moments for the show all year."

== Robin Williams incident ==
A scene in the "Fatman and Robin" segment where Peter attempts suicide, but his handgun becomes Robin Williams.

BBC Three showed a repeat of this episode in the United Kingdom on August 11, 2014, the day Robin Williams committed suicide. The episode aired at 23:25 BST, and news of Williams' death broke about 23:50 BST. Viewers reacted to the coincidence, highlighting that Peter attempted suicide in the episode. A BBC spokesperson said:

The episode ended just as the news broke about his death, this was a repeat that we have shown a couple of times before so who could have planned that? It was scheduled more than two weeks ago so it is just an uncanny coincidence. Some of our people who work here noticed that the death of Robin Williams was announced just as this episode ended. It was due to be repeated on Friday but we will not be showing it now.

When aired on ITV2, the scenes where Peter attempts suicide are removed.

== See also ==
- "Family Guy Viewer Mail #1"
