= Prince Vsevolod Ivanovich of Russia =

Russian prince (1914-1973)

Prince Vsevolod Ioannovich
- Prince of the Blood Imperial
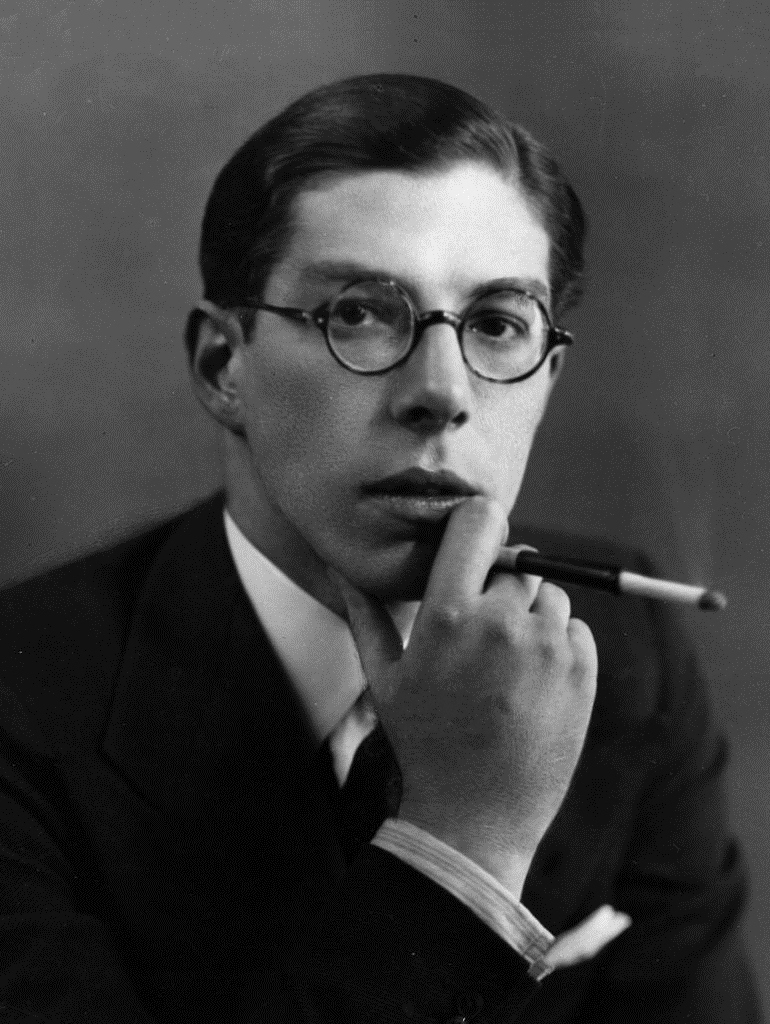
- Vsevolod Ioannovich in 1938
- Born: 20 January 1914; Marble Palace, St. Petersburg, Russian Empire
- Died: 18 June 1973 (aged 59); London, England
- Spouse: Lady Mary Lygon (m. 1939; div. 1956) Emilia de Gosztonyi (m. 1956; div. 1961) Valli Knust (m. 1961; died 1973)
Names
- Vsevolod Ivanovich Romanov
- House: Holstein-Gottorp-Romanov
- Father: Prince John Constantinovich of Russia
- Mother: Princess Helen of Serbia

Prince Vsevolod Ioannovich of Russia (Russian: Все́волод Иоа́ннович Рома́нов; 20 January [O.S. 7 January] 1914 – 18 June 1973) was a male line great-great-grandson of Tsar Nicholas I of Russia and a nephew of King Alexander I of Yugoslavia. He was the last male member of the Romanov family born in Imperial Russia. He was a distant cousin and godson of Tsar Nicholas II of Russia, as well as second cousin of both Prince Philip, Duke of Edinburgh and Princess Marina, Duchess of Kent.

During the revolution his father and two uncles were imprisoned and later murdered along with other Romanov relatives in July 1918. In October 1918 his grandmother fled with the four-year-old Prince Vsevolod to Sweden where he was able be reunited with his mother, Princess Helen of Serbia. After a time in France and Belgrade they eventually settled in England. Prince Vsevolod was educated at Eton and Oxford. He spent the rest of his life in exile in Great Britain. In 1939 he married Lady Mary Lygon of Madresfield Court. They were divorced in 1956. Prince Vsevolod married twice more, but had no children from any of his marriages.

== Early life ==
Prince Vsevolod of Russia, godson of Tsar Nicholas II. 1915.

Prince Vsevolod Ivanovich was the eldest child of Prince John Constantinovich of Russia and Princess Helen of Serbia. He was born on 20 January 1914 at the Marble Palace in St Petersburg. In a manifesto issued the next day, Tsar Nicholas II decreed Vsevelod to be a Highness and a Prince of the Imperial Blood. On 25 January the Emperor, along with his wife Alexandra and his mother, Dowager Empress Maria Feodorovna, attended the Prince's christening in service conducted in the chapel of the Marble Palace by the personal confessor of the imperial couple. Along with the boy's grandmother grand duchess Elizabeth Mavriekievna, Nicholas II was appointed one of his godparents. He spent his early years living with his parents in a suite of rooms in the northern wing of Pavlovsk During the First World War, Vsevelod's father, Prince Ivan fought in the army and was decorated as a war hero, he was at the front when the Russian Revolution of 1917 started. Vsevelod's mother served as a nurse during the war, while Vsevelod and his sister Catherine were left in St. Petersburg under the care of their paternal grandmother.

== Revolution ==
During the chaotic rule of the Provisional Government, and after the October Revolution, Prince Vsevolod lived with his grandmother and some relatives, at Pavlovsk. When the Serbian diplomatic mission left Russia in 1918, they offered to take the family to Finland under Serbian protection. They refused. After the Bolsheviks took power, Vsevolod's father and two of his uncles Constantine and Igor were sent to internal exile in the Urals. They were killed at Alapaevsk, along with other Romanov relatives, in July 1918. Vsevolod's mother, who had followed her husband, spent many months imprisoned, narrowly escaping being killed herself. Prince Vsevolod and his sister were safe under the care of their grandmother in the Marble Palace. As time went on, their circumstances became increasingly difficult as the palace and its contents were requisitioned. Their grandmother was forced to secretly sell family heirlooms to provide for the family.

They were finally able to escape revolutionary Russia with the help of Swedish diplomats, at the invitation of Queen Victoria of Sweden. In October 1918, the small family group consisting of four-year-old Vsevolod, his sister Catherine, their paternal grandmother, his uncle George, his aunt Vera, Miss Irwin (the children's Irish nanny) and three attendants were permitted by the Bolsheviks to leave Russia. They traveled first to Tallinn in Estonia, from there they crossed the Baltic to Finland. In Helsinki they boarded the Swedish vessel Ångermanland and traveled via Mariehamn to Stockholm. At Stockholm harbor, they met Prince Gustaf Adolf, who took them to the royal palace.

== Exile ==
Prince Vsevolod of Russia (wearing a sailor suit) with his sister Catherine and their great grandfather King Nicholas I of Montenegro, 1921.

After spending sometime recuperating in Stockholm royal palace, they moved to a small spa town in Sweden. There, in 1919, Vsevolod was reunited with his mother. They moved to Paris and eventually went to live in Belgrade with his maternal grandfather King Peter I of Serbia. After his death in 1921, Vsevolod's uncle King Alexander bought a Villa at Cap Ferrat in the south of France for Vsevolod, his mother and his sister. They eventually settled in England.

Prince Vsevolod was educated at Eton and Oxford. He boxed and ran for both Eton and Oxford and was described by a friend as "having a great heart". In October 1933 Vsevolod was operated on for appendicitis in a London nursing home. During the following year, Prince Vsevolod, who was in his early twenties, appeared frequently in social circles. He visited Queen Mary in July 1936, attended the christening of Prince Victor Emmanuel of Italy in June 1937 and presided the Russian Charities ball that December. As Mr Romanof, he ran a business in North London selling lubricants.

== The prince and Lady Mary ==
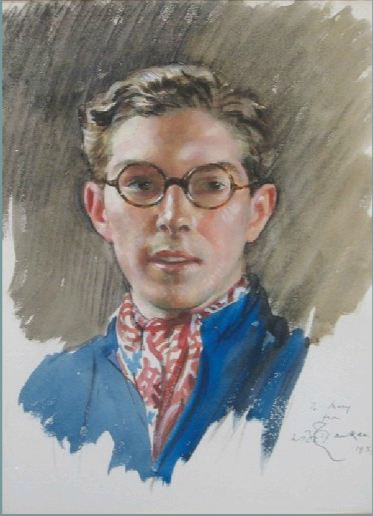
William Ranken (1881–1941). HH Prince Vesevolode of Russia, 1939

Prince Vsevolod's engagement to Lady Mary Lygon was announced on 1 February 1939. The civil marriage took place on 31 May 1939, in Chelsea register office in the presence of two of the bride's sisters, two witnesses and a Russian priest. The religious service was the following day in the Russian Orthodox Church, Buckingham Palace Road. Grand Duke Vladimimir Kirilovich, Grand Duke Dmitri Pavlovich and Prince Dmitri of Russia were among the groomsmen. Lady Mary became Princess Romanovsky-Pavlovsky, the title granted by Grand Duke Vladimir Kirilovich at Vsevolod's request.

Prince Vsevolod of Russia with his wife Lady Mary Lygon. She was created Princess Romanovsky-Pavlovsky.

The couple set up home in a large house in Lenox Gardens. Prince Vsevolod worked at Saccone & Speed Wine Merchants in Sackville Street, London. At the outbreak of World War II in September, the Prince volunteered to serve at night as an Air raid precaution Warden. His duties included ensuring that the blackout was observed, sounding air raid sirens, evacuating areas around unexploded bombs, helping casualties from bomb damage and finding accommodation for people whose homes were destroyed. His wife ran the Princess Pavlovsky's Unit, a Red Cross Unit with one ambulance. In 1940 the couple moved to a small house in Montpelier Walk, South Kensington. They lived in style, in spite of the war time restrictions, giving cocktail and dinner parties often for Serbian diplomats. Prince Vsevolod was made a major in the Serbian army around this time. In August 1942, Evelyn Waugh moved in with the couple, staying in their small cottage between army duties. Waugh was a close friend of Lady Mary and her siblings since 1930. It has been said that Madresfield Court, the ancestral home of the Lygon family was the inspiration for Evelyn Waugh's Brideshead and that the Flytes were based on them. Waugh spent Christmas 1943 with Prince Vsevolod and his wife. The famous author did not have much love for the Prince, resenting having been forced to share his friend with him. Waugh confided in his diary: "I find my dislike of Vsevolod so overwhelming that I cannot sit in the room with him. Mamie [Mary] is lost to me". He thought the prince's existence, with no wine left to sell, was pointless.

After the war Prince Vsevolod and his wife moved to a Palladian style house in North Terrace, Kensington: Alexander house was situated at the end of a cul de sac off the Brompton Road. With no children of their own, they were devoted to their Pekingese dogs. Vsevolod also stood as godfather to George, son of Prince and Princess George Galitzine in May 1947; and to Victoria, daughter of Prince and Princess Frederick of Prussia, in May 1952. In the following years their marriage began to unravel. Both were heavy drinkers and Lady Mary descended into a depressive alcoholic haze. Soon the couple were hurling pots of hot tea at each other. Mary's friends claimed that the prince had spent all her money. By 1952 the couple were broke, living in the same apartments but not speaking. The following year they moved to a flat in Hove, Sussex. Mary resorted to pawning her jewelry. Her eldest brother (now Lord Beauchamp) and sister Lady Lettice suggested that the couple move alternatively between them, an offer they declined. Soon after Christmas 1953, Vsevolod left the marital home. During 1954, Mary's mental health declined. The couple was granted a divorce in February 1956 on the grounds of Prince Vsevolod's adultery.

== Last years ==
In March 1956 at Marylebone register office, Prince Vsevolod quietly married his mistress, Hungarian noblewoman Emilia de Gosztonyi (Budapest 19 April 1914 – Monte Carlo 9 July 1993), daughter of Eugen de Gosztonyi and Ethel Jolán Törö de Thury. Emilie was previously married to Count Sigismund von Berchtold zu Ungarschütz (1900-1979), son of Count Leopold Berchtold, who was divorced from Etti Plesch.

As a daughter of a minor Hungarian nobleman, Emilia was granted the title of Princess Romanovsky by Grand Duke Vladimir. Short of money, in March 1957, the prince sold some old masters at Christie's, among them a portrait of Emperor Paul, Grand Duke Konstantin and Emperor Alexander I. After five years, Prince Vsevolod's second marriage ended in divorce in February 1961. There were no children from this union.

In London on 8 June 1961, Vsevolod married again, this time to Valli Knust (b. London 4 April 1930, d. Sherborne, Dorset 10 July 2012), a woman sixteen years his junior. She was created Princess Romanovsky Knust; their marriage was very happy, but they had no children. In January 1966 Prince Vsevolod was appointed personal assistant to the Chairman and chief Executive of United Guarantee, holdings. In June 1970 Vsevolod underwent an operation in London, the beginning of a long painful battle with cancer. He died in London on 18 June 1973. His funeral services took place a week later at the Russian Orthodox church in Kensington. Among those present were Prince and Princess Paul of Yugoslavia and Prince and Princess Vassili of Russia.

== Ancestry ==
Ancestors of Prince Vsevolod Ivanovich of Russia

8. Grand Duke Constantine Nikolaevich of Russia
4. Grand Duke Constantine Constantinovich of Russia
9. Princess Alexandra of Saxe-Altenburg
2. Prince John Constantinovich of Russia
10. Prince Moritz of Saxe-Altenburg
5. Princess Elisabeth of Saxe-Altenburg
11. Princess Augusta of Saxe-Meiningen
1. Prince Vsevolod Ivanovich of Russia
12. Alexander I, Prince of Serbia
6. Peter I of Serbia
13. Persida Nenadović
3. Princess Helen of Serbia
14. Nicholas I of Montenegro
7. Princess Ljubica of Montenegro
15. Milena Vukotić

== Bibliography ==
- Hall, Coryne. Lady Mary and the 'Pauper Prince'. Royalty Digest Quarterly. N4 2009.
- Zeepvat, Charlotte, The Camera and the Tsars, Sutton Publishing, 2004, ISBN 0-7509-3049-7.
