= Demidov =

Russian noble family

House of Demidov
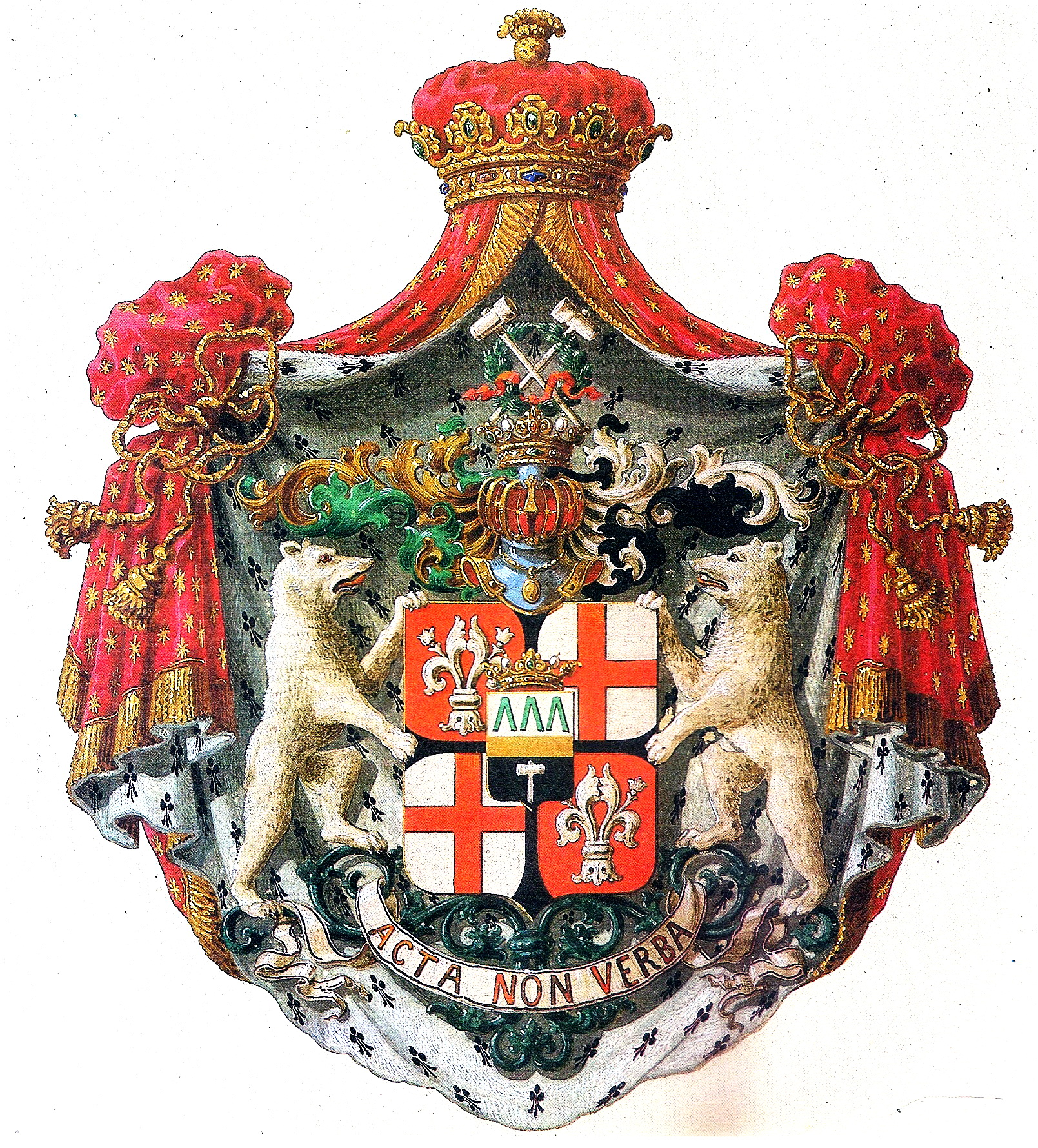
- Princely Arms of the House of Demidov
- Origin: Tula, Russia
- Members: Nikita Demidov; Nikolai Nikitich Demidov; Anatoly Demidov
- Connected families: House of Bonaparte; House of Karađorđević
- Distinctions: Prince of San Donato
- Heirlooms: Demidov collection
- Estate: Villa San Donato

Original arms of the Demidov family

The Demidov family (Russian: Деми́довы), also known as Demidoff or Dimidov, is a prominent Russian noble family that rose to immense wealth and influence during the 18th and 19th centuries.

== Later History and Legacy ==
The second and last Prince Lopukhin, Pavel Petrovich Lopukhin (1788–1873), son of Pyotr Lopukhin, was granted the right in 1873 to pass his title and name to his great-nephew, General Nikolai Petrovich Demidov (1836–1910), who became the 1st Prince Lopukhin-Demidov. A representative of another branch of this industrialist clan, Nikolai was succeeded by his son, Colonel Aleksander Nikolayevich Demidov (1870–1937), the 2nd Prince Lopukhin-Demidov. After the Russian Revolution, Aleksander relocated to Finland, purchasing Anttolanhovi Manor in Anttola near Mikkeli in 1917, where he resided briefly until exhausting his inheritance. His wife, Princess Natalia Dmitrievna Naryshkina (1886–1957), died in Mikkeli in 1957.

== Notable Members ==
- Nikita Demidov (1656–1725): founder of the family fortune, ennobled by Peter the Great
- Akinfiy Demidov (1678–1745): expanded the family’s mining empire
- Prokofi Akinfiyevich Demidov (1710–1786): industrialist, philanthropist
- Pavel Grigoryevich Demidov (1738–1821): philanthropist, active state councillor, botanist, and a patron of Russian education
- Nikolay Nikitich Demidov (1773–1828): ober-chamberlain, industrialist, benefactor, and patron of the arts
- Pavel Nikolaievich Demidov (1798–1840): governor of Kursk, active state councillor, master of the hunt, philanthropist, founder of the Demidov Prize
- Aurora Demidova (1808-1902): philanthropist
- Anatoly Nikolaievich Demidov (1812–1870): 1st Prince of San Donato, art collector, and patron
- Pavel Pavlovich Demidov (1839–1885): 2nd Prince of San Donato, jurist, philanthropist, and author
- Elim Pavlovich Demidov (1868-1943): 3rd Prince of San Donato, ambassador, master of the hunt, chamberlain, active state councillor
- Nikolai Petrovich Demidov-Lopukhin (1836-1910): 1st Prince Lopukhin-Demidov, lieutenant general

== Hereditary commanders of the Knights Hospitaller ==
In 1798, Nikolay Nikitich Demidov was appointed Family Commander of the Russian Grand Priory of the Order of Saint John by Tsar Paul I. Those favored by Emperor Paul and his son Alexander were granted beneficed Commanderies, while others were encouraged to use their wealth to establish their own Commanderies; these were known as Family or Ancestral Commanderies

In 1811, a Ukase was enacted which brought this institution to an end. However, by personal grant of the Emperor, the title of "Hereditary Commander" was held by some descendants who qualified.

In 1928, a group of descendants of the original Family Commanders formed an Association. By 1958, the group was chaired by Grand Duke Vladimir (claimant to the Russian Throne). This group regulated the claims of the descendants. On 14 April 1958, under his signature of Grand Duke Vladimir decided in favour of Paul Demidoff; "de faire droit à Votre requête et de confirmer Votre titre de Commandeur Héréditaire de l'Union des Descendants des Commandeurs Héréditaires et Chevaliers du Grand Prieuré Russe de l'Ordre de St. Jean de Jérusalem en tant que descendant direct de Demidoff Nicolas fils de Nicétas qui, par grâce de Mon trisaïeul, S.M. l'Empereur Paul I-r Grand Maître de l'Ordre de St. Jean de Jérusalem avait été élevé le 2I Juillet 1799" - in translation; "to grant Your request and to confirm Your title of Hereditary Commander of the Union of the Descendants of the Hereditary Commanders and Knights of the Russian Grand Priory about St John of Jerusalem as a direct descendant of Demidoff Nicholas son of Nicétas which, by grace of My great-great-grandfather, H.M. the Emperor Paul I Grand Master of the Order of St John of Jerusalem had been elevated 21 July 1799".

Alexandre Tissot Demidoff (of Berkshire, England) chairs an association dedicated to continuing the humanitarian tradition of the Russian Grand Priory, of which Alexander Demidoff (of Paris, and son of Paul Demidoff mentioned above) is a member.

== Lineage ==
- Nikita Demidov (1656–1725)
  - Akinfiy Nikitich Demidov (1678–1745)
    - Prokofi Akinfiyevich Demidov (1710–1786)
    - Grigory Akinfiyevich Demidov (1715–1761)
      - Aleksander Grigoryevich Demidov (1737–1803)
        - Grigory Alexandrovich Demidov (1765–1827)
          - Pyotr Grigoryevich Demidov (1807–1862)
            - Nikolai Petrovich Demidov-Lopukhin (1836–1910)
      - Pavel Grigoryevich Demidov (1738–1821)
    - Nikita Akinfiyevich Demidov (1724–1789)
      - Nikolai Nikitich Demidov (1773-1828)
        - Pavel Nikolaievich Demidov (1798–1840)
          - Pavel Pavlovich Demidov, 2nd Prince of San Donato (1839–1885)
            - Elim Pavlovich Demidov, 3rd Prince of San Donato (1868–1943)
            - Aurora Pavlovna Demidova (1873–1904)
            - Anatoly Pavlovich Demidov, 4th Prince of San Donato (1874–1943)
        - Anatoly Demidov, 1st Prince of San Donato (1813–1870)

== Publications ==
- Anatole Demidoff, Travels in Southern Russia, and the Crimea; through Hungary, Wallachia, & Modavia, during the Year 1837, London, J. Mitchell, 1853, LCCN 05-33883

== See also ==
- Alla Demidova
- Demidov collection
- Demidov Square
- Demidovsky Pillar, Barnaul
- Demidovsky Pillar, Yaroslavl
- Princedom of San Donato
- Villa San Donato
