= Anatoly Pavlovich Demidov, 4th Prince of San Donato =

Anatoly Pavlovich Demidov
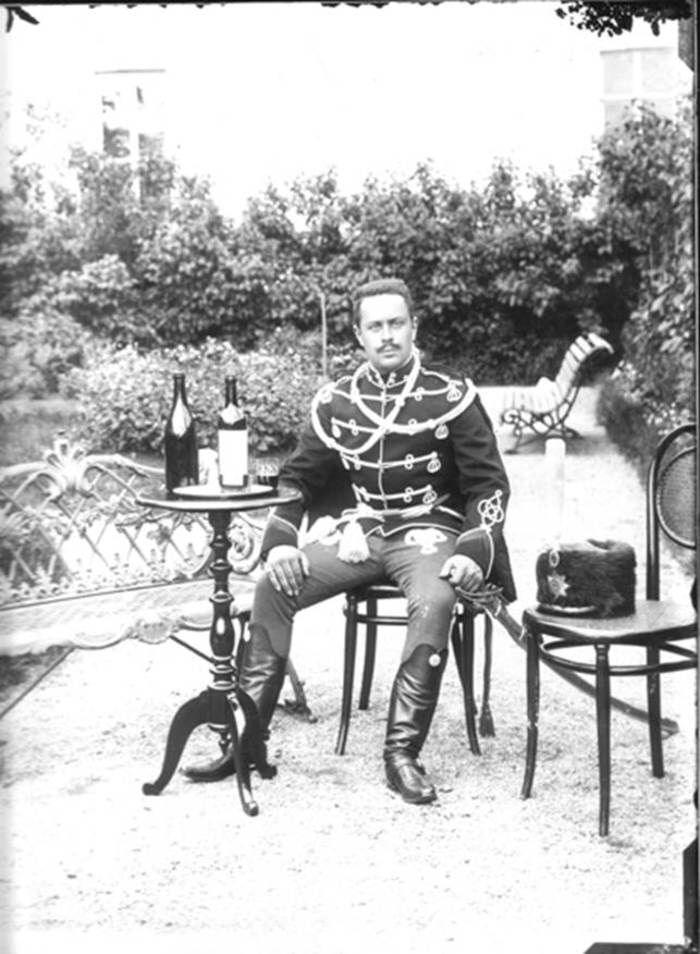

Prince of San Donato
- Reign: 1943
- Predecessor: Elim Demidov
- Successor: Extinct
- Born: 12 November 1874; San Donato
- Died: 27 October 1943 (aged 68); Marseille
- Spouse: Evgenia Klimentievna Podmener (m. 1894)
- Issue: Elena Anatolyevna Demidova; Evgenia Anatolyevna Demidova; Aurora Anatolyevna Demidova
- House: Demidov
- Father: Pavel Pavlovich Demidov, 2nd Prince of San Donato
- Mother: Princess Hélène Petrovna Trubetskoy

Count Anatoly (called Anatole) Pavlovich Demidov, 4th Prince of San Donato (Russian: Анатолий Павлович Демидов; 31 November OS: 12 November 1874 in San Donato – 27 October 1943 in Marseille) of the House of Demidov, was the last Prince and member of his house. He succeeded his elder half-brother Elim Pavlovich Demidov, 3rd Prince of San Donato in 1943 but died in exile in the same year without male issue.

== Life ==
Anatoly Demidov was the son of Pavel Pavlovich Demidov, 2nd Prince of San Donato by his second wife, Princess Elena Petrovna Trubetskaya (1853-1917). His paternal grandmother was Finnish philanthropist Aurora Karamzin. His father died when young Anatoly was just 11 years old.

In Saint Petersburg on 1 February 1894 he married Evgenia Klimentievna Podmener (Saint Petersburg, 12 December 1871 - Nice, 13 October 1958), who belongs to a wealthy family of the Finnish landowning class (Podmener Estate in Terijoki, Grand Duchy of Finland), by whom he had three daughters:

- Princess and Countess Elena Anatolyevna Demidova (Saint Petersburg, 28 August OS: 15 August 1901 - Montreal, 26 June 1970), married in Nice on 29 July 1926 Paul René Geoffroy (Nyons, 2 May 1903 - Montreal, 27 October 1991)
- Princess and Countess Evgenia Anatolyevna Demidova (Saint Petersburg, 25 September OS: 12 September 1902 - Cazouls-lès-Béziers, 25 April 1955), married in Nice on 29 September 1927 Jean Gerber (Sevastopol, 2 February 1905 - Geneva, 9 September 1981)
- Princess and Countess Aurora Anatolyevna Demidova (Wiesbaden, 11 December 1909 - Marseille, 17 March 1944), married in Marseille on 29 July 1933 Jean Giraud (Marseille, 26 October 1912 - Nice, 5 February 1962)

== Gallery ==
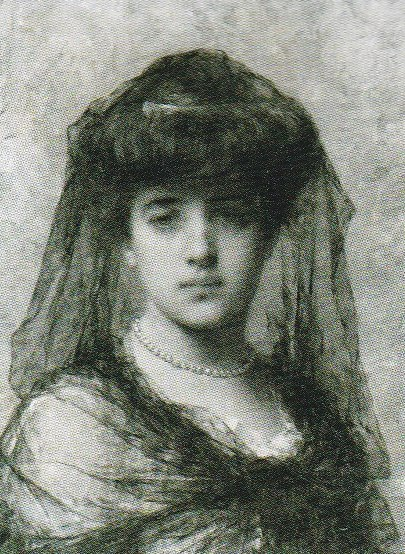
Anatoly's mother: Princess Elena Petrovna Trubetskaya

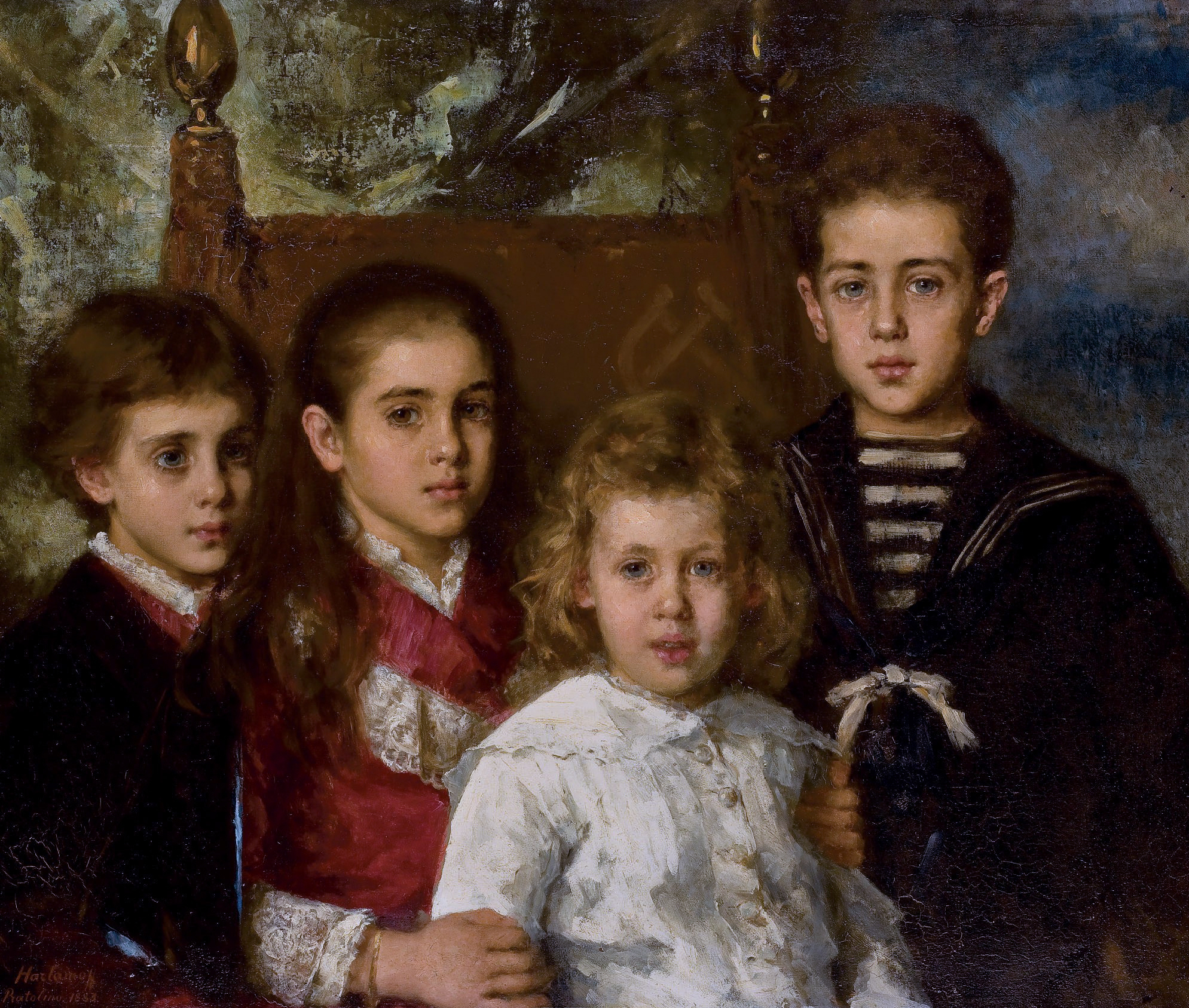
Anatloy with his siblings by Alexei Harlamoff

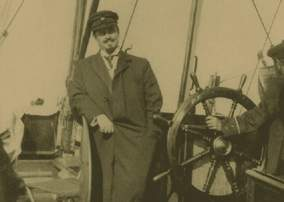
Anatoly Pavlovich Demidov, 4th Prince of San Donato

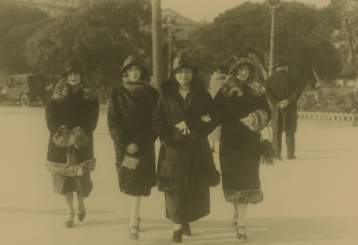
Evgenia Klimentievna Demidova with daughters Evgenia, Avrora and Helena (Nizza, 1925)

Italian nobility
Preceded by Elim Demidov	Prince of San Donato; 1943	Extinct
