= Elim Pavlovich Demidov, 3rd Prince of San Donato =

Elim Pavlovich Demidov
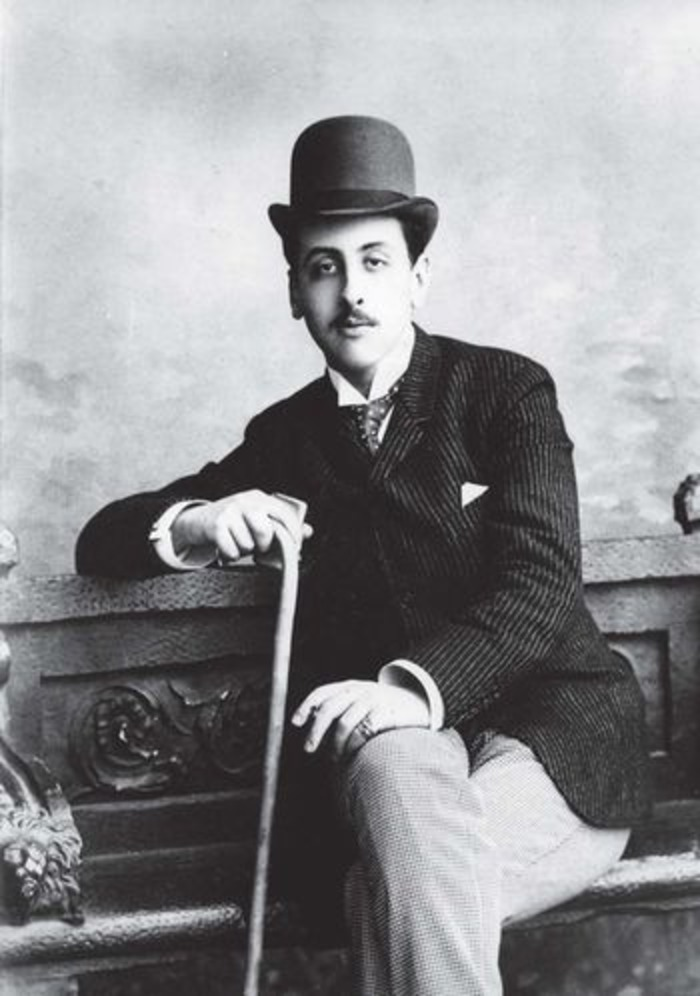

Prince of San Donato
- Reign: 1885-1943
- Predecessor: Pavel Demidov
- Successor: Antoly Demidov
- Born: 6 August 1868; Hietzing, Vienna
- Died: 28 March 1943 (aged 74); Athens
- Burial: Church of the Holy Trinity, Athens
- Spouse: Countess Sophia Hilarionovna Vorontsova-Dashkova (m. 1893)
- House: Demidov
- Father: Pavel Demidov
- Mother: Maria Meshcherskaya

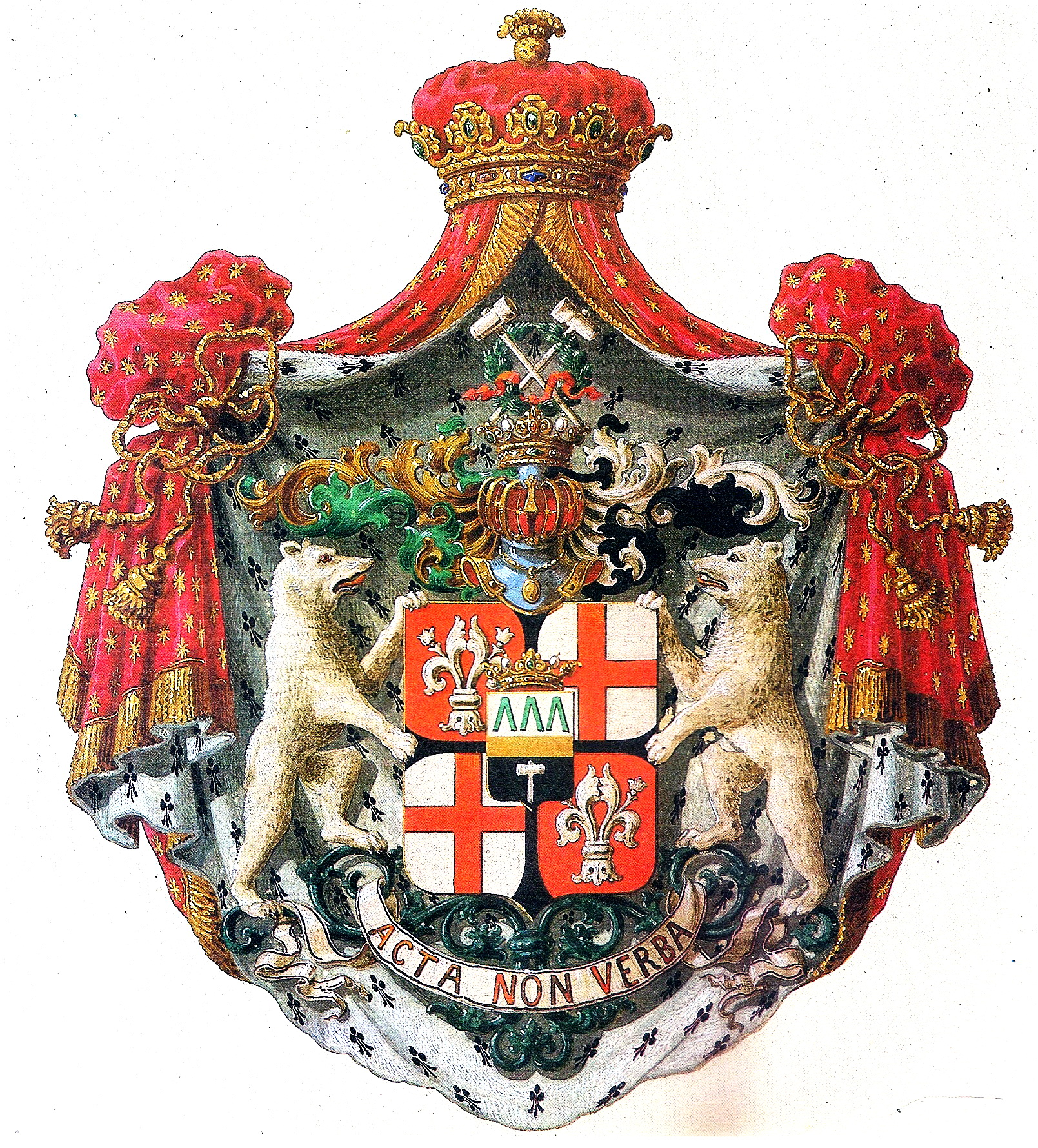
Coat of arms

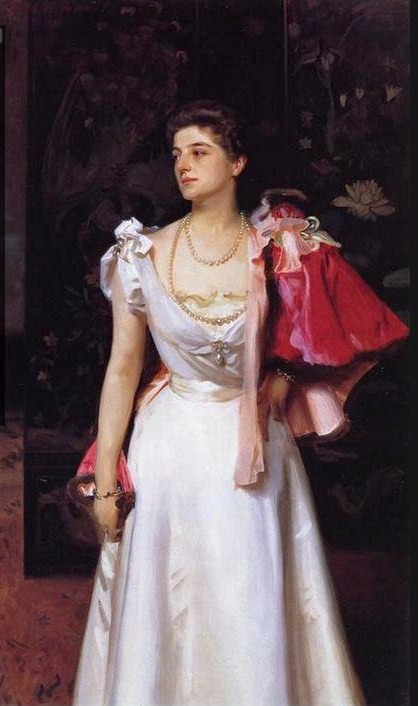
Sophia Illarionovna Demidova, 3rd Princess of San Donato (1870-1953), by John Singer Sargent, 1895-1896. Toledo Museum of Art, Ohio, United States.

Elim Pavlovich Demidov, 3rd Prince of San Donato (Russian: Елим Павлович Демидов; 6 August (20 June, per Ferrand) 1868, in Hietzing suburb of Vienna – 28 March 1943, in Athens) of the Demidov industrial family, was the Russian Empire's last ambassador to Greece, where he and his wife remained in exile and him as White Russian ambassador.

== Family ==
Elim Demidov was the only son of Princess Maria Meshcherskaya and Pavel Pavlovitch Demidov, 2nd Prince of San Donato. His mother, descended from indigenous princes of the Volga Finns of Meshchera and Mordovia, died two days after his birth, whilst Elim's paternal grandmother was the Finnish beauty and philanthropist Aurora Karamzin.

Elim got close with his grandmother Aurora, who took care of him as an infant. His father died when Elim was just 18 years old. He had six half-brothers and half-sisters from his father's second marriage with Princess Elena (Hélène) Petrovna Trubetskaya.

He married Countess Sophia Hilarionovna Vorontsova-Dashkova (9 August 1870, Novo Temnikovo - 16 April 1953, Athens), in Saint Petersburg on 18 April 1893. They had no children.

== Career ==
Speculating in 1895 about the richest man on earth, The Atlanta Journal-Constitution stated that "the wealth of Elim Demidoff is beyond calculation".

In the early 20th century, Emperor Nicholas II sent Prince Elim as the Russian ambassador to the Greek court. His Greek connections played a role when he arranged his nephew Prince Paul of Yugoslavia to marry Princess Olga of Greece and Denmark in 1923.

He died in 1943, and is buried with his wife at the Russian Orthodox Church of the Holy Trinity, Athens. His half-brother Anatoly Pavlovich Demidov became the 4th Prince of San Donato.

== Honours ==
- Chamberlain, Russia, 1897
- Master of the Hunt, Russia, 1901
- Active State Councillor, Russia, 1912

== Writings ==
- Hunting Trips in the Caucasus (1898)
- After wild sheep in the Altai and Mongolia (1900)

== Notes ==
Italian nobility
Preceded by Pavel Demidov	Prince of San Donato; 1885-1943	Succeeded by Anatoly Demidov
