= Pavel Pavlovich Demidov, 2nd Prince of San Donato =

Russian entrepreneur and diplomat (1839–1885)

Pavel Pavlovich Demidov
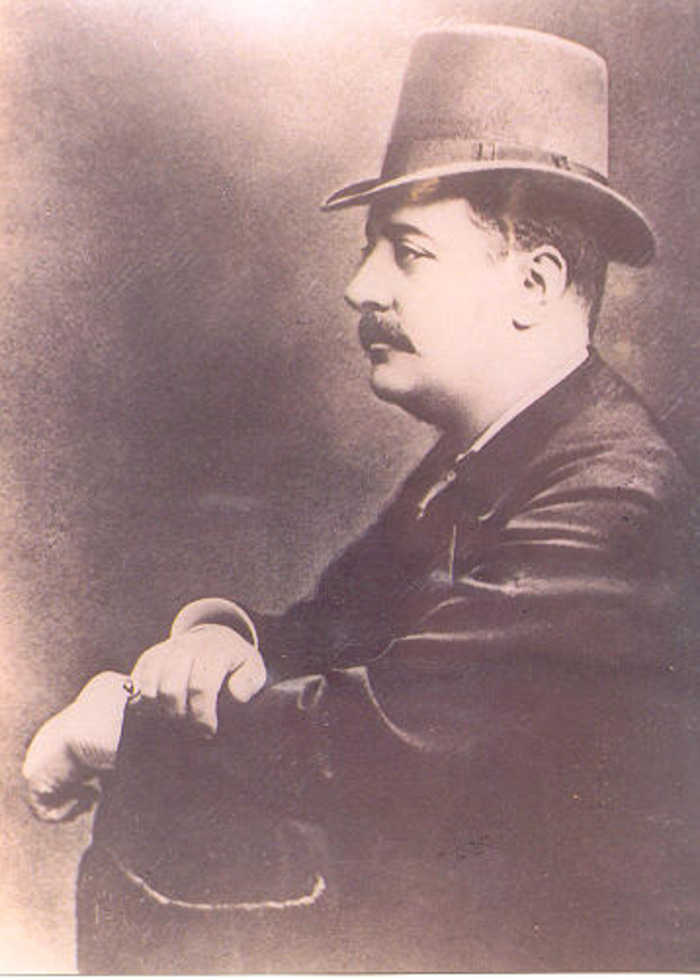

Prince of San Donato
- Reign: 1870–1885
- Predecessor: Anatoly Demidov
- Successor: Elim Demidov
- Born: 9 October 1839; Frankfurt / Bad Kissingen
- Died: 26 January 1885 (aged 45); Pratolino, Florence
- Spouse: Maria Meshcherskaya (m. 1867; died 1868) Princess Hélène Petrovna Trubetskaya (m. 1871)
- Issue: Elim Pavlovich Demidov; Nikita Pavlovich Demidov; Aurora Pavlovna Demidova; Antoly Pavlovich Demidov; Maria Pavlovna Demidova; Pavel Pavlovich Demidov; Elena Pavlovna Demidova
- House: Demidov
- Father: Pavel Nikolaievich Demidov
- Mother: Aurora Karamzin

Pavel Pavlovich Demidov, 2nd Prince of San Donato (Russian: Павел Павлович Демидов; 9 October 1839 – 26 January 1885) was a Russian industrialist, jurist, master of the hunt at Russian imperial court, philanthropist and nobleman of the House of Demidov. He was the only child of Finnish philanthropist Aurora Karamzin and Prince Pavel Nikolaievich Demidov.

== Life ==
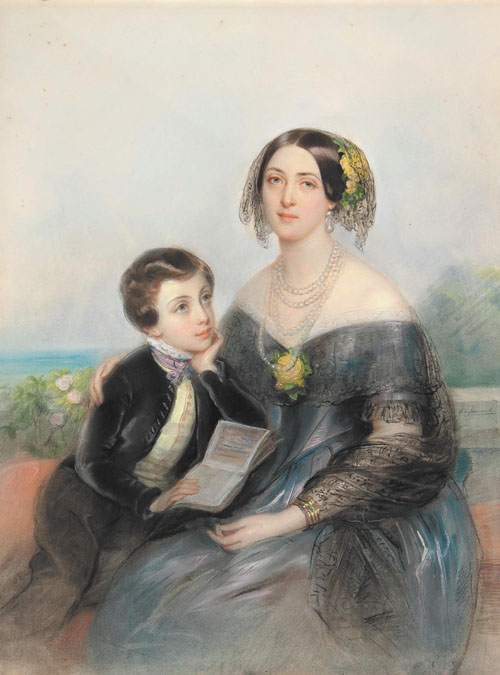
Aurora Demidova with son Paul by L. H. de Liomenil, 1840's. Sold by the Demidoff family at Christie's in New York, 2007.

=== Early life ===
Paul Pavlovich was six months old when his father died. Paul was a sensitive, beautiful, lively and versatile young man with a varied and short-tempered character. His education was planned by his mother and supervised by a governor. Experts were hired to teach individual subjects. He became interested in horses as a child and he took riding lessons, having the privilege of riding the horse of Grand Duchess Maria, from his mother's close relations to the Imperial family.

He succeeded in obtaining a law degree in St. Petersburg in 1860. He worked for the state for a short time, e.g. as Extraordinary Secretary to the Russian Delegations in Vienna and Paris.

Paul's father's younger brother Anatole Demidov lived permanently in Florence. He secured the possession of his valuable art collection and other Demidov property, he made Paul his sole heir. King Victor Emanuel accepted the inheritance of the title of Prince of San Donato to Paul. Paul also received the same title from Alexander II in Russia. Paul also became Imperial Master of the Hunt and Privy Councillor, like his father.

=== Bachelor life ===
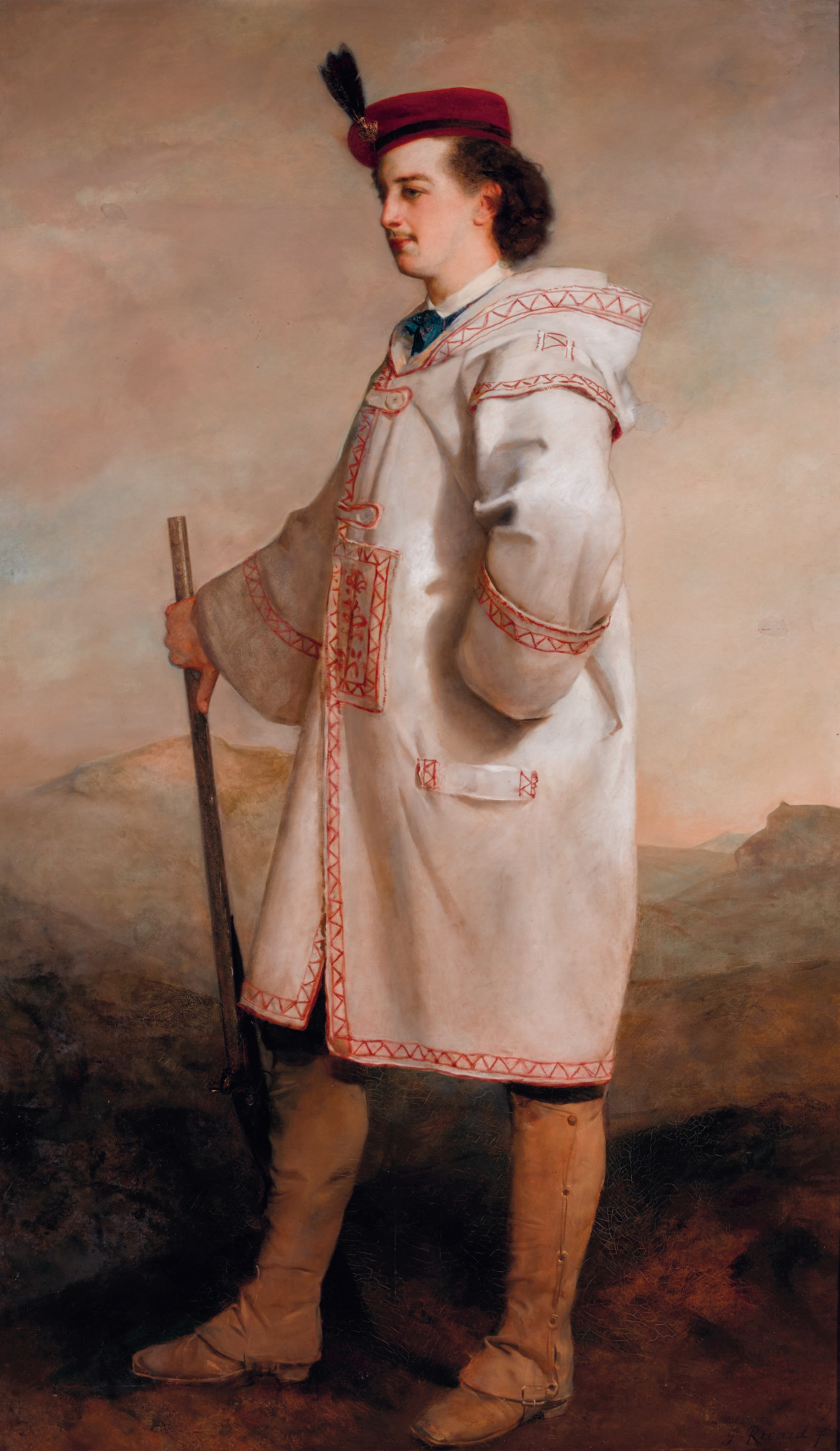
Paul Demidoff, Prince of San Donato. Gustave Ricard, 1859.

During Paul's bachelorhood, he has been described by his contemporaries as a boastful personality. Under the influence of his Uncle Anatole, Paul has been involved with Paris aristocracy through gambling and relationships. He had homes in Paris and resort town of Deauville. His experiences included visiting casinos and hotels frequently.

Because of his volatile nature, he got into trouble time and time again - even in a duel with a Spaniard, which mother Aurora had to settle. Alarming information about Paul's behaviour was also carried to the relatives and to the court in Russia. Aurora settled in Paris for the winter seasons between 1863 and 1865 in an attempt to control her son's life. In order to pay Paul's enormous gambling debts, she had to sell Le Grand Sancy diamond for £100,000 (c. £6 million in 2017 currency), given to her as a morning gift the day after the wedding, by Paul's father.

It was not until 1862 that the estate of Father Paul Demidov was finally divided. At the same time, the management of the Demidov companies were completely taken over by the young Paul Demidov, when mother Aurora stepped aside. Uncle Anatole Demidov had resigned from the company as early as 1856, when Paul had turned 17 years old. The result was a decline in the profitability of the company's production. There were several reasons. Anatole Demidov's annuity was disproportionate to the company's return. Paul himself spent a wasteful life and had little interest in running the company.

Part of the reason was the abolition of serfdom in Russia in 1861, when mining companies also lost their free labour. As the situation worsened, mother Aurora had to return to the company's management. It was feared that the mines were running out, and costs rose when the workers had to be paid in cash. Paul had to sell his mansion in Paris along with its art collections, and also his luxurious villa at Deauville. The Demidov palace on the exclusive Bolshaya Morskaya Street in Saint Petersburg was rented and finally sold in 1875 to the Italian ambassador. Things came to such a state that Aurora's four stranded nut-sized morning gift pearls were being held by a bank as a security for the company's one million-rouble debt (c. $14,400,000 in 2017 currency). Pearls can be seen in the portrait of Aurora, with the young Paul.

However, Anatole Demidov's death in 1870 alleviated the situation of the Demidov company, as his large annuity did not accumulate anymore in the company's expenses.

=== Married life ===
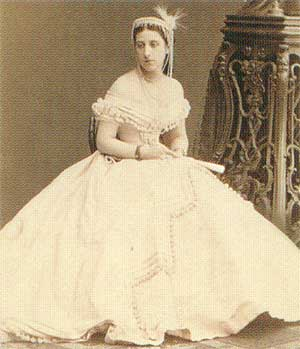
Maria Elimova Meshcherskaya, 1866

Paul's troubled life was changed by his falling in love with a lady-in-waiting from Saint Petersburg, Princess Maria Mescherskaya. Paul met Maria in Paris in the spring of 1867. His first marriage was 1 June 1867 to Princess Mariya Meshcherskaya (1844–1868). She died two days after giving birth to a son, Elim Pavlovich Demidov, 3rd Prince of San Donato, at Hietzing in the suburbs of Vienna 6 August 1868.

Losing his wife had a lasting effect on Paul, who remained inconsolable for a long time, spending a long while in the room in the Villa San Donato where Maria's dresses were kept, trying to recover her presence. Mother Aurora took charge of little Elim, who became very close to her grandmother. In October 1868, Paul and little Elim and Aurora moved to Paris, where they prepared a residence for themselves.

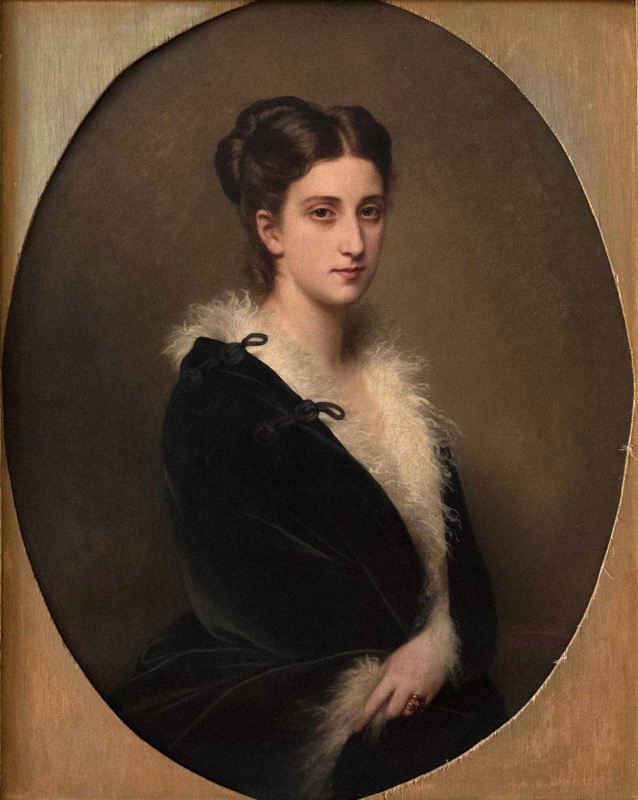
Maria Meshcherskaya Demidova

In the memory of his wife Paul set up a workplace for 200 women in the working-class district of Paris. The purpose of the department was to improve the moral and physical life situation of the working class. In 1869 he was appointed to the Kyiv Provincial Government. He held his office well and was promoted to mayor a year later.

Paul's uncle, Anatole Demidov, died in Florence in the spring of 1870. Paul permanently resigned from the civil service and moved on to live a great international life as Prince of San Donato. The mansion near San Donato in Florence with its valuable art collections was now been taken over by Paul Demidov.

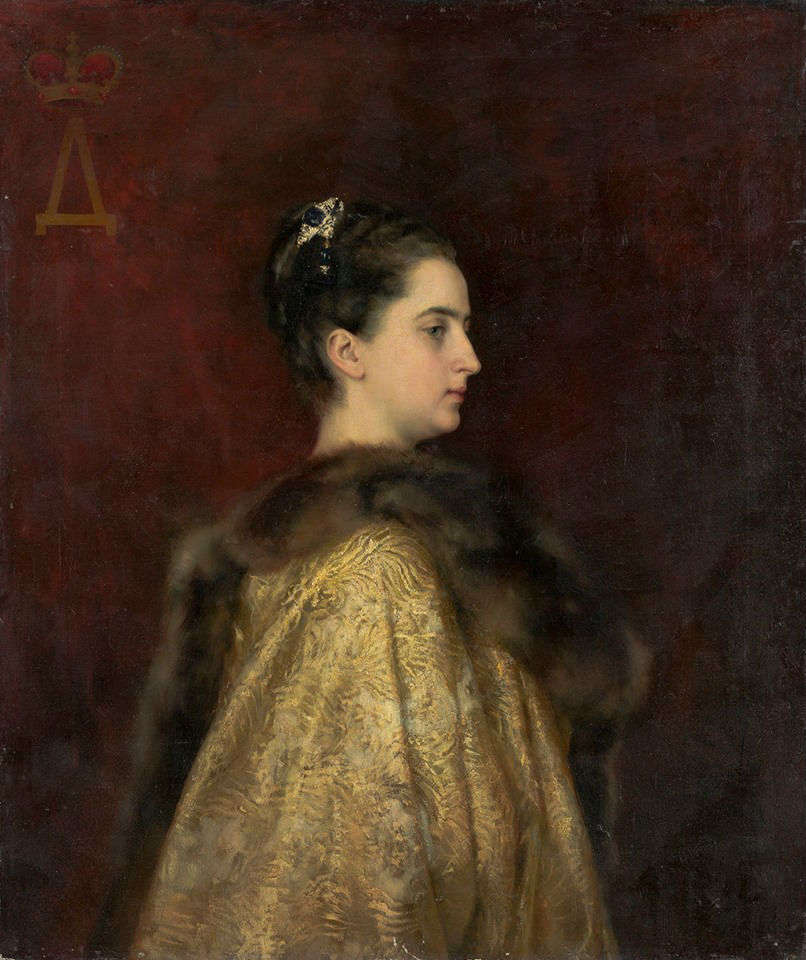
Elena Petrovna Demidova Trubetskaya. Albert Edelfelt, 1884

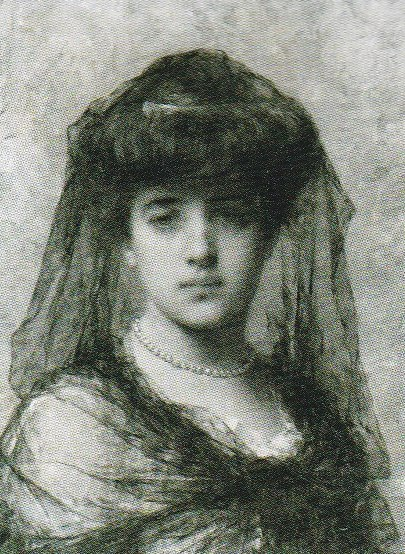
Elena (Hélène) Petrovna Trubetskaya, Alexei Harlamov 1880s

He married secondly in Saint Petersburg 2 June 1871 to Princess Elena (Hélène) Petrovna Trubetskaya (1853–1917). The mother of the new spouse, Princess Elizabeth Trubetskaya, had lived most of her life in Paris, especially after the death of her husband Prince Pjotr Nikitich Trubetskoy (1826–1880).

They had six children:

- Prince, Count Nikita Pavlovich Demidov (1872–1874)
- Princess, Countess Aurora Pavlovna Demidova (1873–1904)
- Anatoly Pavlovich Demidov, 4th Prince of San Donato (1874–1943)
- Princess, Countess Maria Pavlovna Demidova (1877–1955)
- Prince, Count Pavel Pavlovich Demidov (1879–1909)
- Princess, Countess Elena Pavlovna Demidova (1884–1959)

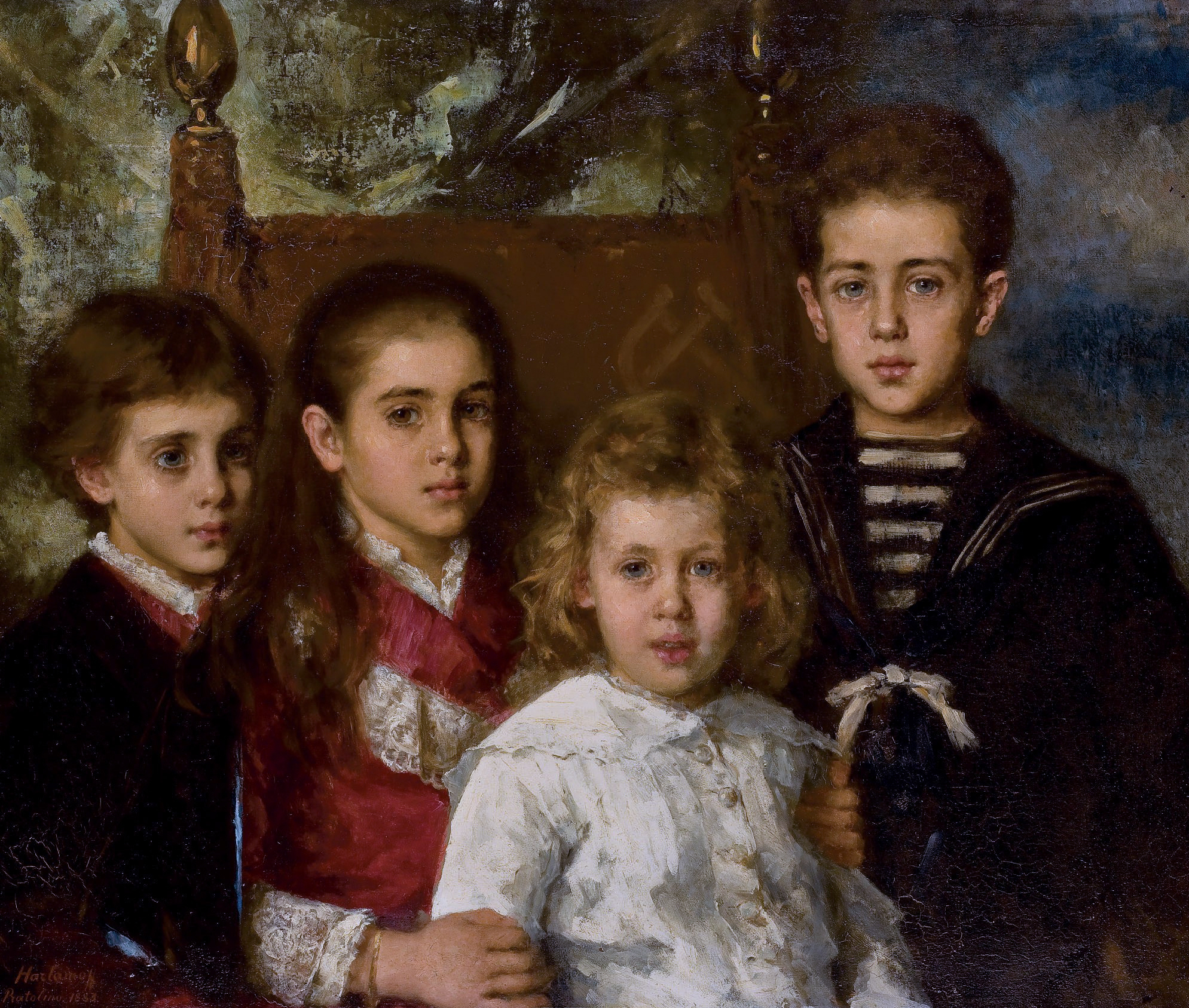
Portrait of the children of Paul Pavlovich Demidoff. Left to right: Pavel, Aurora, Maria and Anatoli. Alexei Harlamov, 1883.

Deciding that San Donato was too full of memories of his first wife, Paul bought in 1873 Pratolino, a large farm, from the estate of the Grand Duke of Tuscany. He immersed several millions in its restoration. When the castle-like Villa Pratolino, now known as Villa Demidoff, was ready to be inhabited, Paul and his family moved there from San Donato. They ended up selling San Donato, and it was ceded on 5 November 1881 to Gaston Mestayer, a French business magnate, with the gardens sold separately to Nemesio Papucci and Rosselli Del Turco.

A significant portion of the Demidov collection, housed in 14 rooms at San Donato, was dispersed through a series of sales and public auctions. This included works from the “musée napoléonien” established on Elba by Anatoly Nikolaievich Demidov, 1st Prince of San Donato, as well as souvenirs that had largely been transferred to him by his father-in-law, Jérôme Bonaparte.

Coat of Arms of Paul Demidov

=== Life as philanthropist and patron of arts ===
By following his family traditions in charity, Paul Demidov was respected in Russia as well as in Italy and France. Her target areas were schools, universities, libraries, hospitals, pharmacies, folk kitchens, and single mothers' work homes. He supported the renovation of the cities of Kiev and Florence. Because of him, the Cathedral of Santa Maria del Fiore in Florence was completed. A visible sign of this is the coat of arms of Paul Demidov on the façade of the cathedral next to the main entrance.

Owning hundreds of factories in Russia, millions of square kilometres of land and palaces in Russia, France and Italy, Paul was considered as one of the richest men in Europe. He developed the family fortunes and inherited Anatole's title of Prince of San Donato after the latter's death without legitimate issue in 1870, with the title recognised by King Victor Emmanuel II of Italy two years later. He served with the Red Cross rather than the Russian military forces during the Russo-Turkish War and in 1883 he published the pro-Jewish The Jewish Question in Russia.

Paul Demidov died at the age of 45, due to a liver disease. He was buried in the Demidov family mausoleum in Nizhny Tagil. After Paul's death, his wife, Hélène Trubetskaya, took over the management of the company because all the children were minors, with the youngest only turning seven months old. The estate was divided in 1887 among several owners. Despite many difficulties, the Nizhny Tagil mining and factory area remained family-owned until 1917.

== Honours ==
- Master of the Hunt, Russia, 1871
- Order of Saints Maurice and Lazarus,Italy
- Order of the Crown of Italy, Italy
- Honorary Citizen of Florence, Italy
- Imperial Order of Saint Stanislaus, Russia, 1st class

Italian nobility
Preceded by Anatoly Demidov	Prince of San Donato; 1870–1885	Succeeded by Elim Demidov
