= Princedom of San Donato =

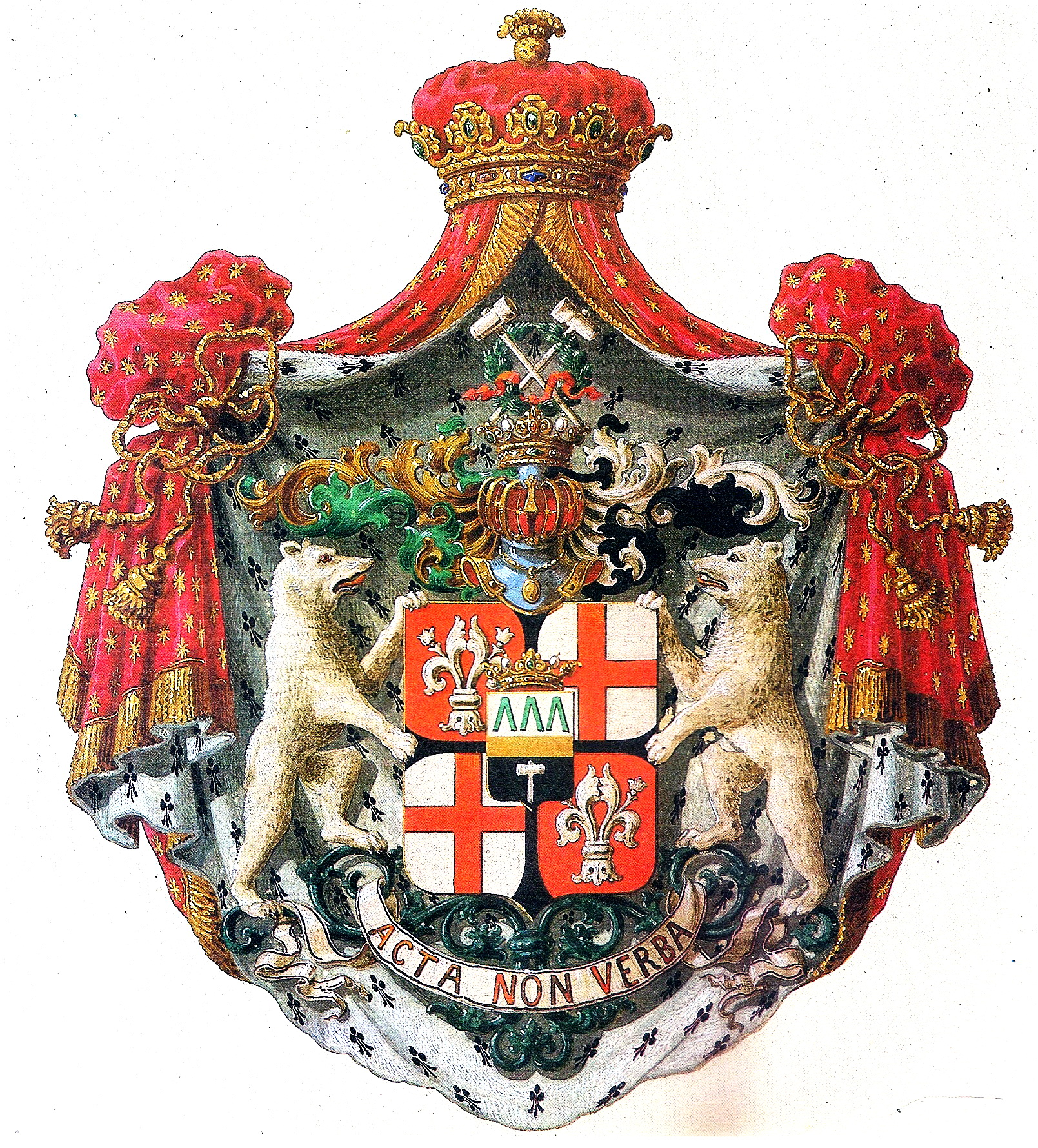
Coat of arms of the Princes of San Donato

The Principality of San Donato was created by Leopold II, Grand Duke of Tuscany, for the Italophile member of the Russian nobility, Anatoly Nikolaievich Demidov in 1840, so that Demidov could marry Mathilde Bonaparte, niece of Napoleon, without her losing the title of Princess.

== History ==
By the imperial decree of the Russian Emperor on June 2, 1872, the mayor of Kyiv, with the rank of chamberlain and collegiate councilor Pavel Pavlovich Demidov, was permitted "to accept the title of Prince of San Donato granted to him by His Majesty the King of Italy." By the imperial decree of December 4, 1891, Privy Councilor Elim Demidov was permitted "to use the title of Prince of San Donato granted by the Italian government to his late father, Pavel Demidov, but only within the borders of the Kingdom of Italy." It was named after Villa San Donato, the Demidov family's villa, built by the first prince's father near Florence.

== List of holders ==
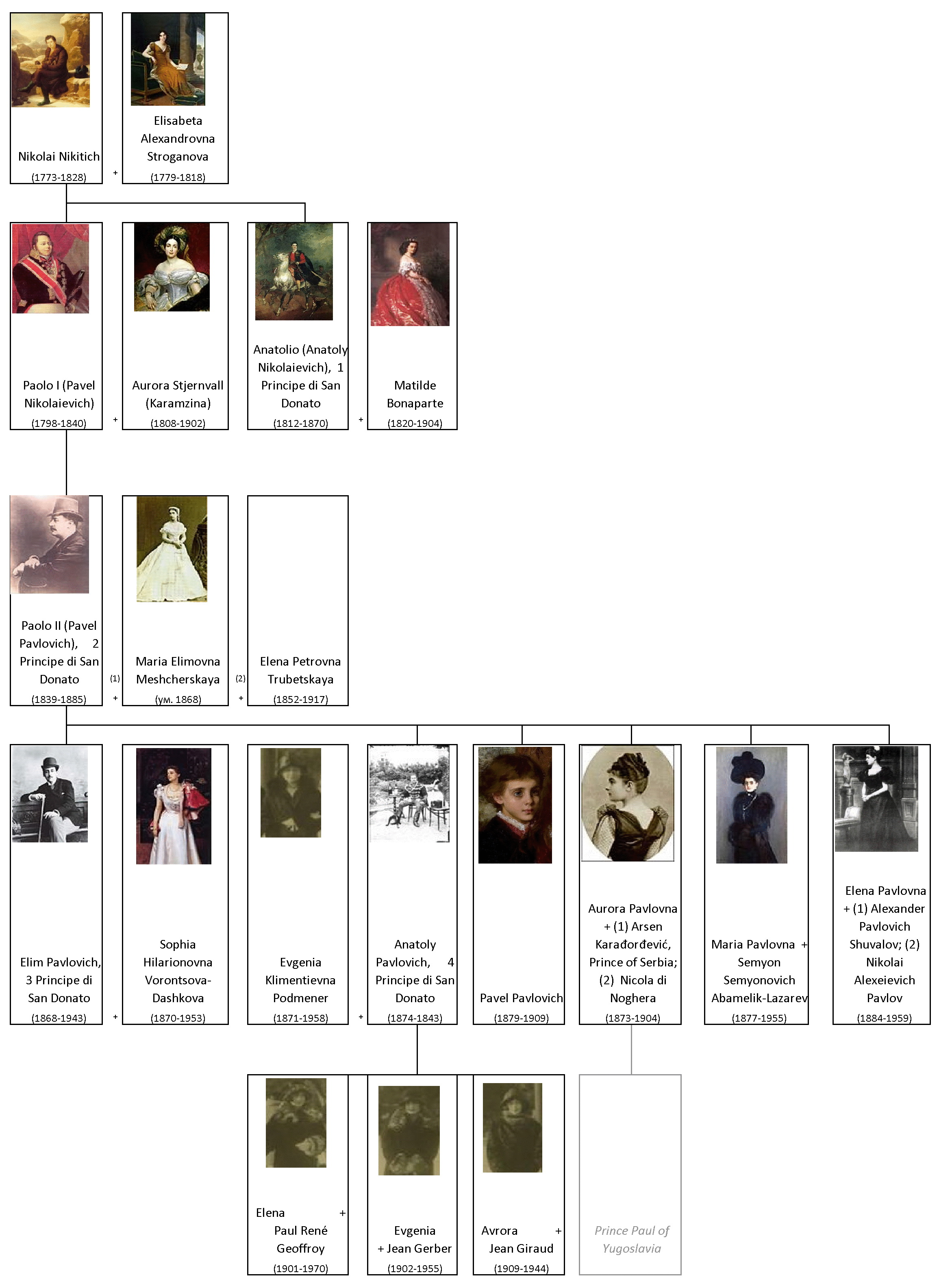

1. Anatoly Nikolaievich Demidov, 1st Prince of San Donato (1813-1870), Prince from 1840 creation, died without legitimate issue
2. Pavel Pavlovich Demidov, 2nd Prince of San Donato (1839-1885), nephew of the former
3. Elim Pavlovich Demidov, 3rd Prince of San Donato (1868-1943), son of the former
4. Anatoly Pavlovich Demidov, 4th Prince of San Donato (1874-1943), half-brother of the former

== Gallery ==
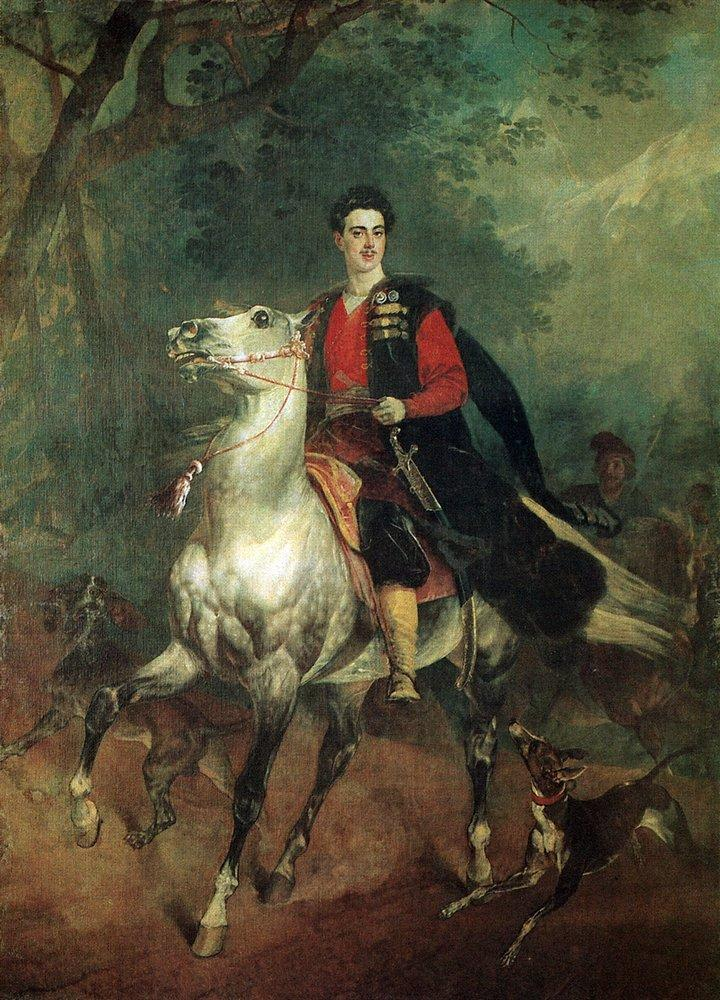
Anatole Nikolaievich Demidov, 1st Prince of San Donato

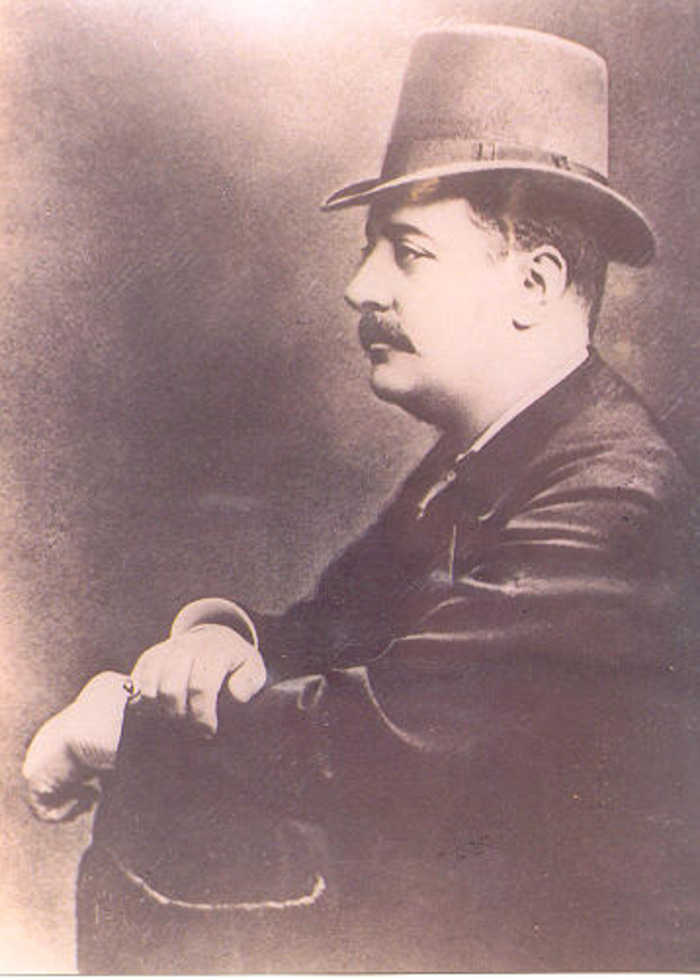
Paul Pavlovich Demidov, 2nd Prince of San Donato

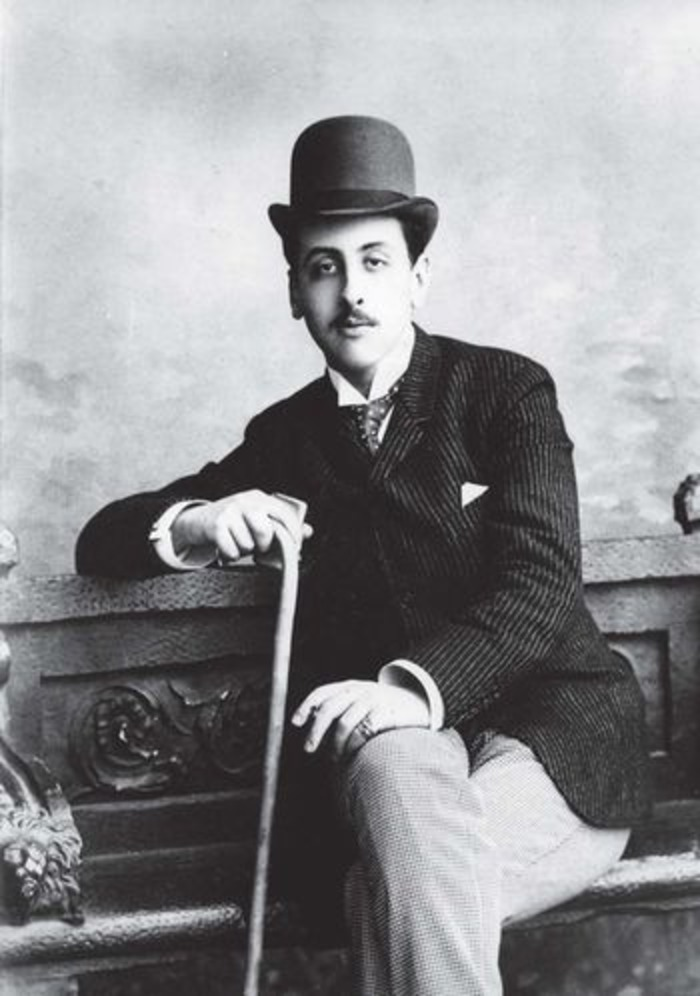
Elim Pavlovich Demidov, 3rd Prince of San Donato

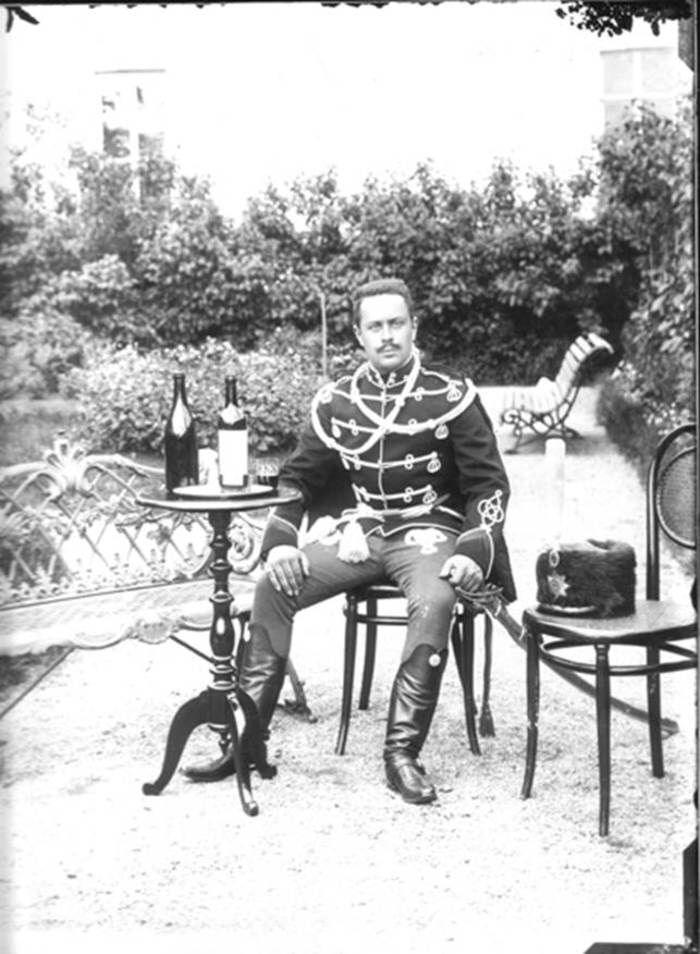
Anatoly Pavlovich Demidov, 4th Prince of San Donato
