= Aurora Pavlovna Demidova =

Russian noblewoman (1873–1904)

- Princess Arsen of Yugoslavia; Countess Nicola Giovanni di Noghera
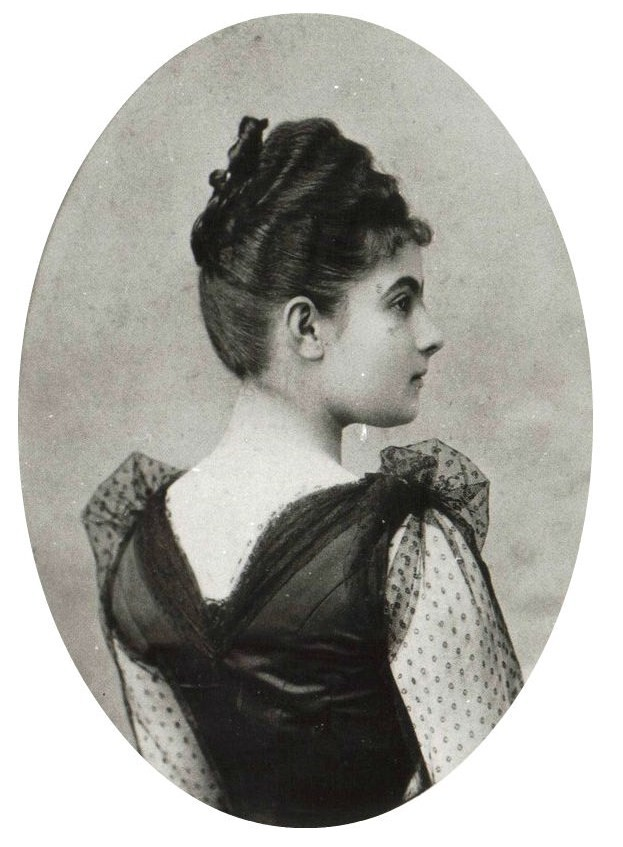
- Born: 2/3 November 1873; Kiev, Russian Empire (now Ukraine)
- Died: June 28, 1904 (aged 30); Turin, Kingdom of Italy
- Burial: Russian Orthodox Cemetery, Nice, France
- Spouse: Prince Arsen of Yugoslavia (m. 1892; div. 1896) Count Nicola Giovanni di Noghera (m. 1897)
- Issue: Prince Paul of Yugoslavia; Nikolai Karageorgevich; Sergei Karageorgevich; Helena Aurora di Noghera; Alberto di Noghera; Giovanni di Noghera; Amedeo di Noghera
- House: Demidov (by birth); Karadjordjevic (by marriage) di Noghera (by marriage)
- Father: Pavel Pavlovich Demidov, 2nd Prince of San Donato
- Mother: Princess Elena Petrovna Trubetzkaya

Aurora Pavlovna Demidova, Princess of San Donato (2/3 November 1873 in Kiev – 28 June (OS: 16 June) 1904 in Turin) was a Russian noblewoman and by birth a member of the House of Demidov.

== Early life ==
Demidova was the eldest daughter of Pavel Pavlovich Demidov, 2nd Prince of San Donato, and his second wife, Princess Elena Petrovna Trubetskoy (1853–1917). Her paternal grandparents were the Finland Swede philanthropist Aurora Stjernvall von Waleen (later Karamzin) and Russian Pavel Nikolaievich Demidov. Her maternal grandparents were Prince Peter Nikitich Trubetskoy (1826–1880) and Princess Elizabeth Belosselsky-Belozersky.

== First marriage ==
Demidova married Prince Arsen of Serbia, youngest son of Alexander Karađorđević, Prince of Serbia and Princess Persida, at the Uspenski Cathedral in Helsinki (where her grandmother Aurora lived) on 1 May 1892. Their son, Prince Paul of Yugoslavia, who later became the Regent of Yugoslavia, was born the following year. They divorced in 1896 due to Demidova's affair with Count Ernst Andreas von Manteuffel (1873–1953), elder son of Count Ernst Gotthard II von Manteuffel (1844-1922) and his wife, Marie Dorothea von Weiss (1847-1938), which led to the birth of twins, Nikolai (1895–1933) and Sergei (1895–1912). Nikolai is buried next to his mother in the Russian Orthodox Cemetery, Nice.

== Second marriage ==
She remarried an Italian Count Palatine Nicola Giovanni Maria di Noghera (Eboli, 15 June 1875 – Genoa, 1 April 1944) on 4 November 1897, with whom she had four children:

1. Alberto (1896 – 1971), who had a daughter named Italia in 1916.
2. Helena Aurora (22 May 1898 – 12 October 1967), who married Gaston Tissot, and had a son named Humbert in 1921.
3. Giovanni (8 March 1900)
4. Amedeo Alberto Maria (9 February 1902 – 1982)

== Death ==
She died at the age of 30 on 16 June 1904 in Turin. She was buried in the Russian Orthodox Cemetery, Nice, France.
