= Committee for Finnish Affairs =

The Committee for Finnish Affairs (Finnish: Suomen asiain komitea; Swedish: Kommittén för finska ärenden) was a committee in the Grand Duchy of Finland that assisted the Minister-Secretary of State for Finland with various issues regarding Finland for the years from 1811 to 1826 and then from 1857 to 1891.

== Literature ==
- Schweitzer, Robert (1996). The Rise and Fall of the Russo-Finnish Consensus: The History of the "Second" Committee on Finnish Affairs in St. Petersburg (1857–1891). Hallintohistoriallisia tutkimuksia, 23. Helsinki: Commission on the History of Central Administration in Finland & Edita. ISBN 951-37-1878-6. ISSN 0786-7700.
