= Demidov Collection =

Collection of artworks

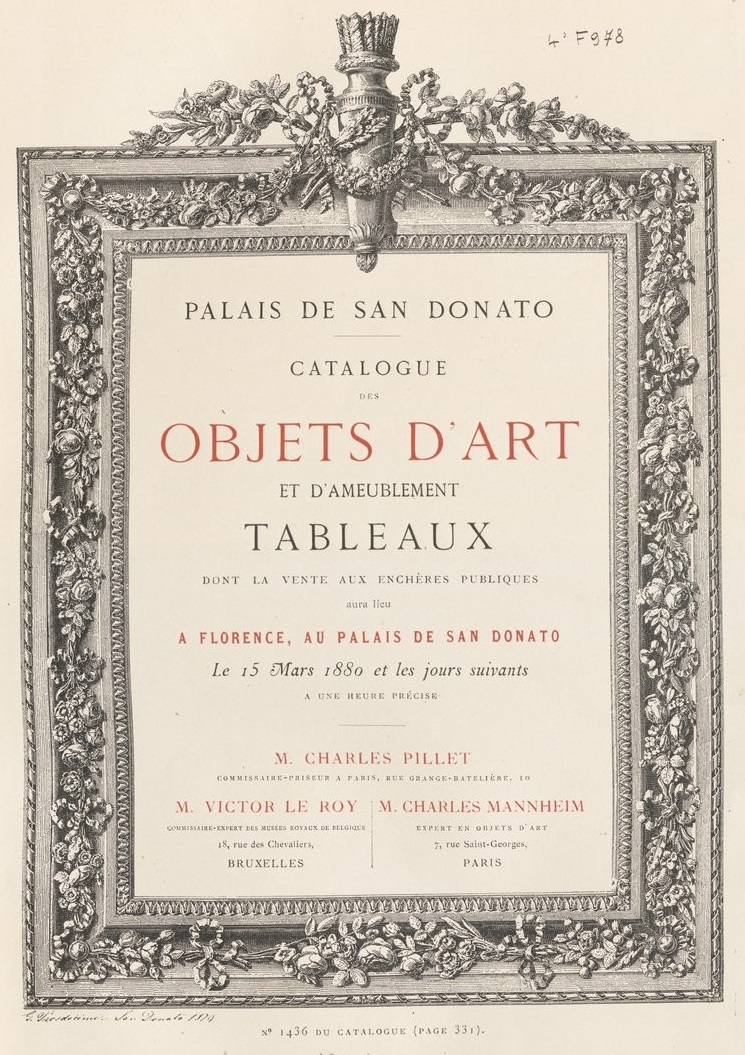
Sale catalogue, 1880

The Demidov collection was a collection of artworks gathered by the Russian industrialist Count Nikolay Nikitich Demidov and considerably expanded by his second son Anatoly Nikolaievich Demidov, 1st Prince of San Donato. It was mainly on show at their Villa San Donato near Florence, in which a private museum of 14 rooms was devoted to them. It was dispersed at sales in Paris in 1863 on 21 February and 3 March 1870 and at the Villa in March 1880.

== Objects ==
=== Paintings ===
- Camille Corot, Orpheus.
- Eugène Delacroix, Christopher Columbus and his son at La Rábida, hst. 90.3 by 118 centimetres (35.6 in × 46.5 in), commissioned by Anatole, 1838. Washington, D.C., National Gallery of Art.
- Paul Delaroche, The Execution of Lady Jane Grey, acquired by Anatole at the 1834 Paris Salon. National Gallery, London
- 16th century German school, Portrait of a woman, hsp. 44.2 cm × 31.7 cm (17.4 in × 12.5 in), acquired by Nicolay. Washington, D.C., National Gallery of Art.
- François Marius Granet, The Death of Poussin, acquired by Anatole in 1833.
- Hans Memling, The chalice of Saint John the Evangelist, hsp. 30.2 cm × 23 cm (11.9 in × 9.1 in), c. 1470–1475, acquired by Nicolay. Washington, D.C., National Gallery of Art.
- Hans Memling, Saint Veronica, hsp. 30.3 cm × 22.8 cm (11.9 in × 9.0 in), c. 1470–1475, acquired by Nicolay. Washington, D.C., National Gallery of Art.
- Rubens, Landscape with milkmaids and cows, c. 1616. Liechtenstein Museum, Vienna.
- Gerard Terborch, The Peace of Munster, 1648. National Gallery, London (on long-term loan to Rijksmuseum, Amsterdam).
- Diego Velázquez, Philip IV. National Gallery, London.
- Jan Vermeer van Delft, The geographer, c. 1668, acquired in 1872 by Paul Pavlovitch Demidov.
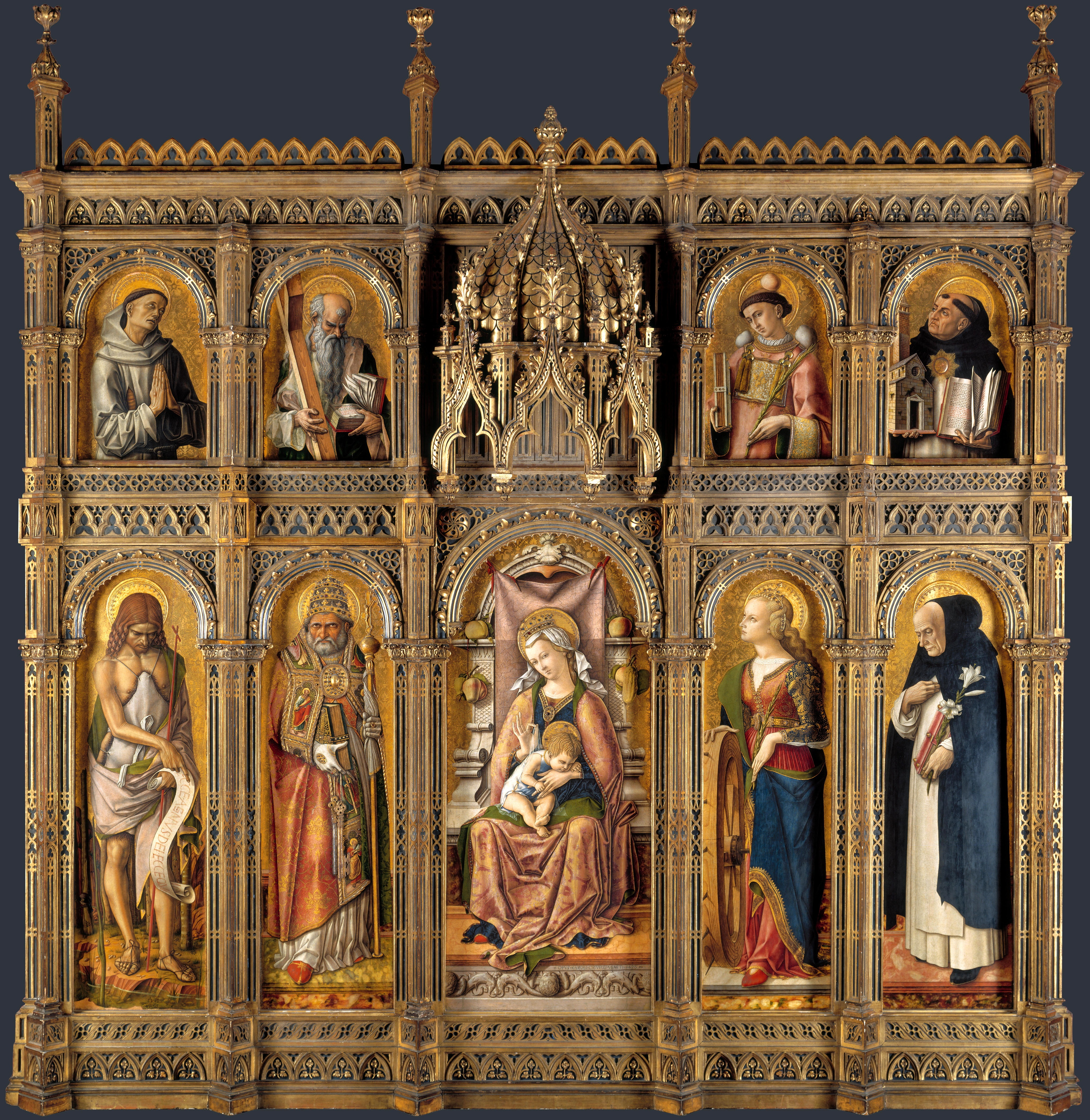

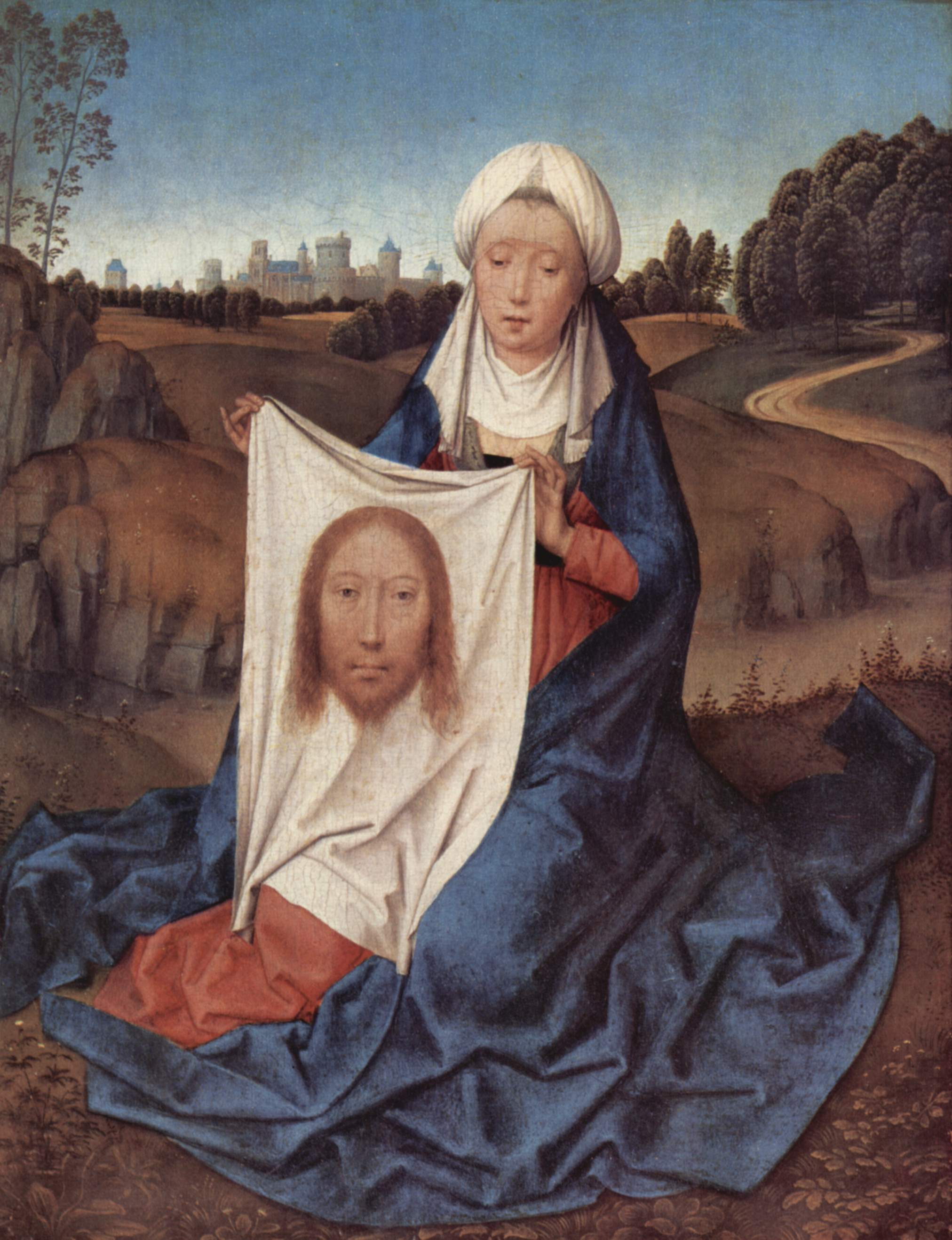

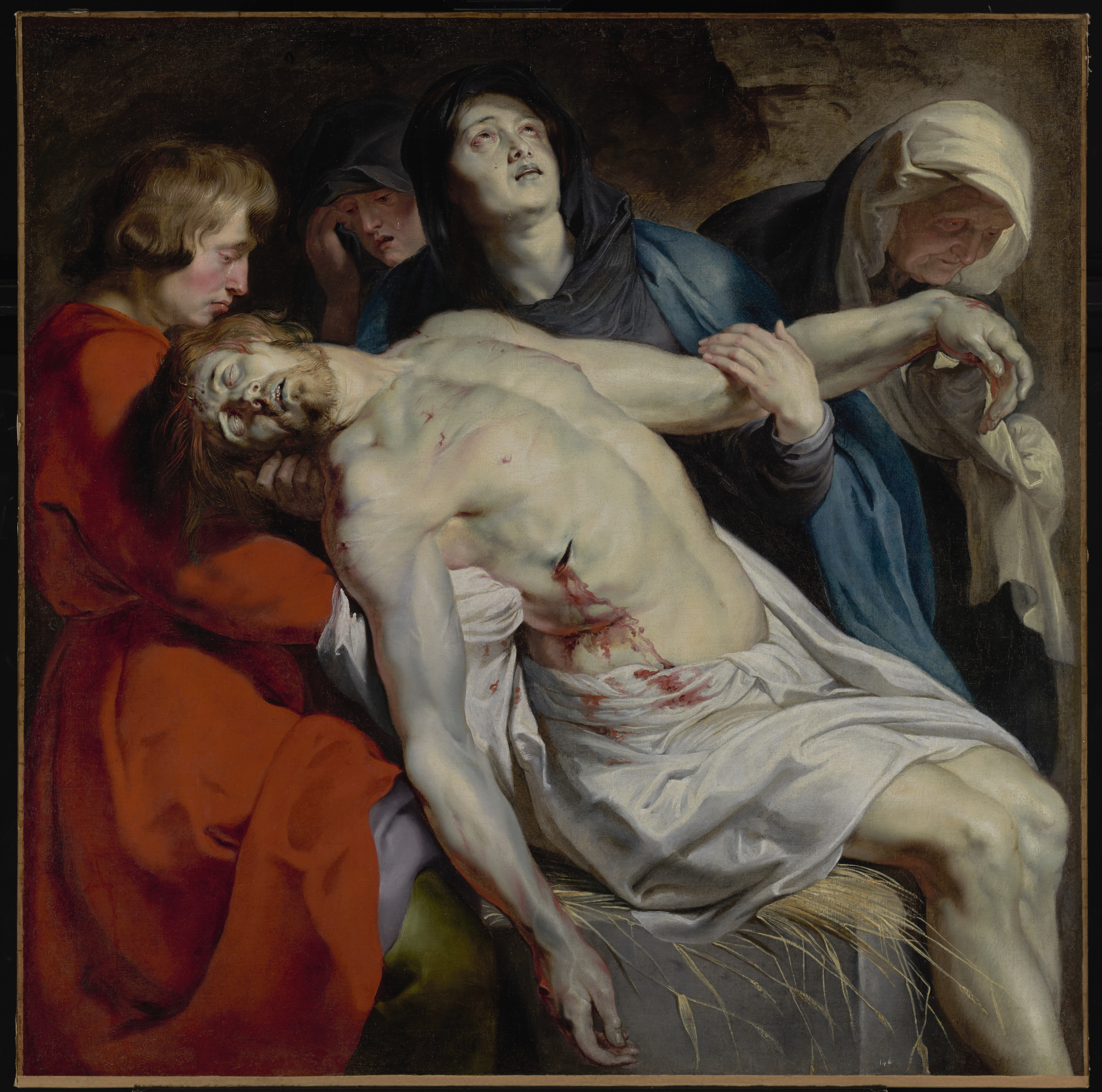

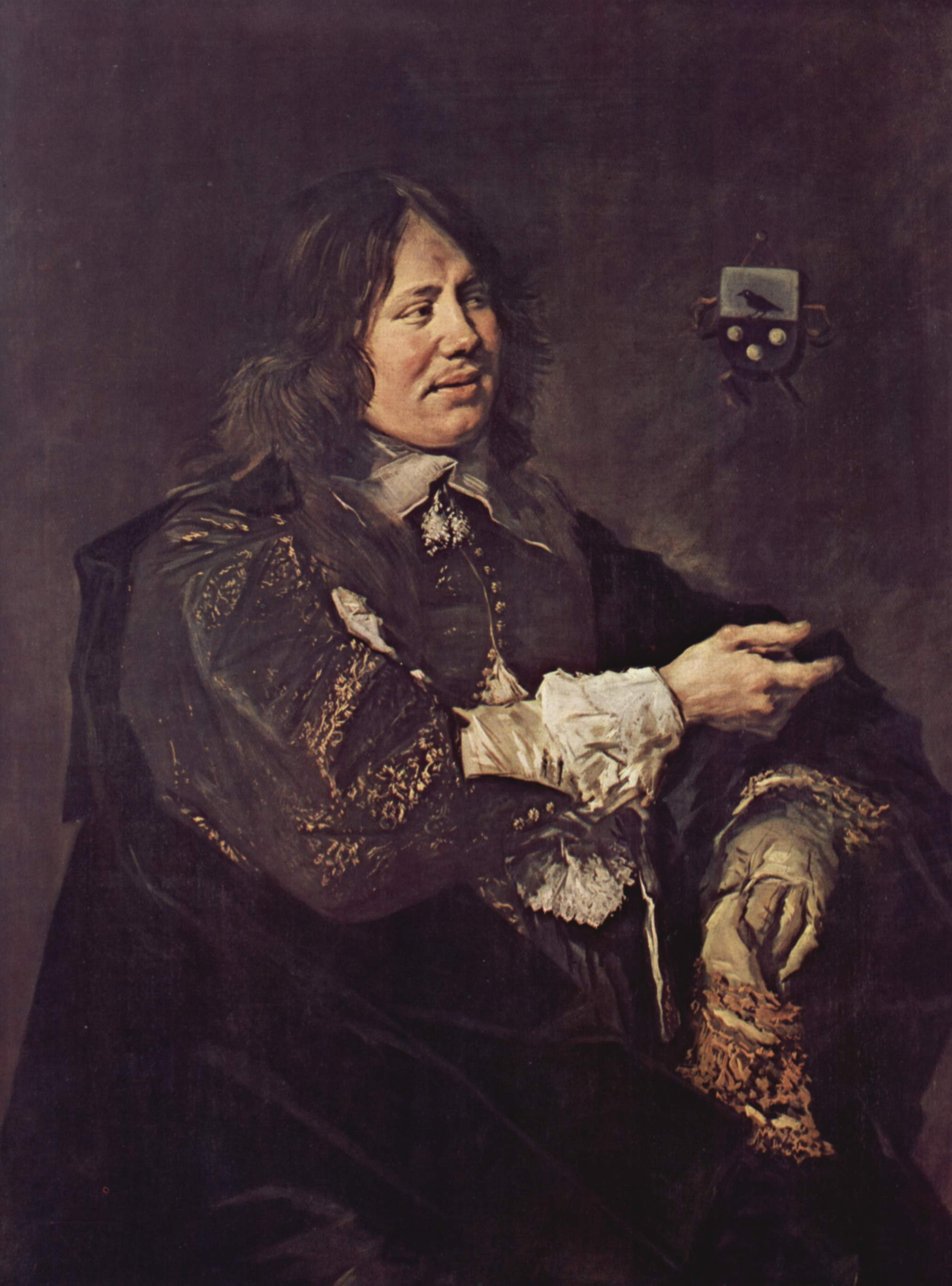

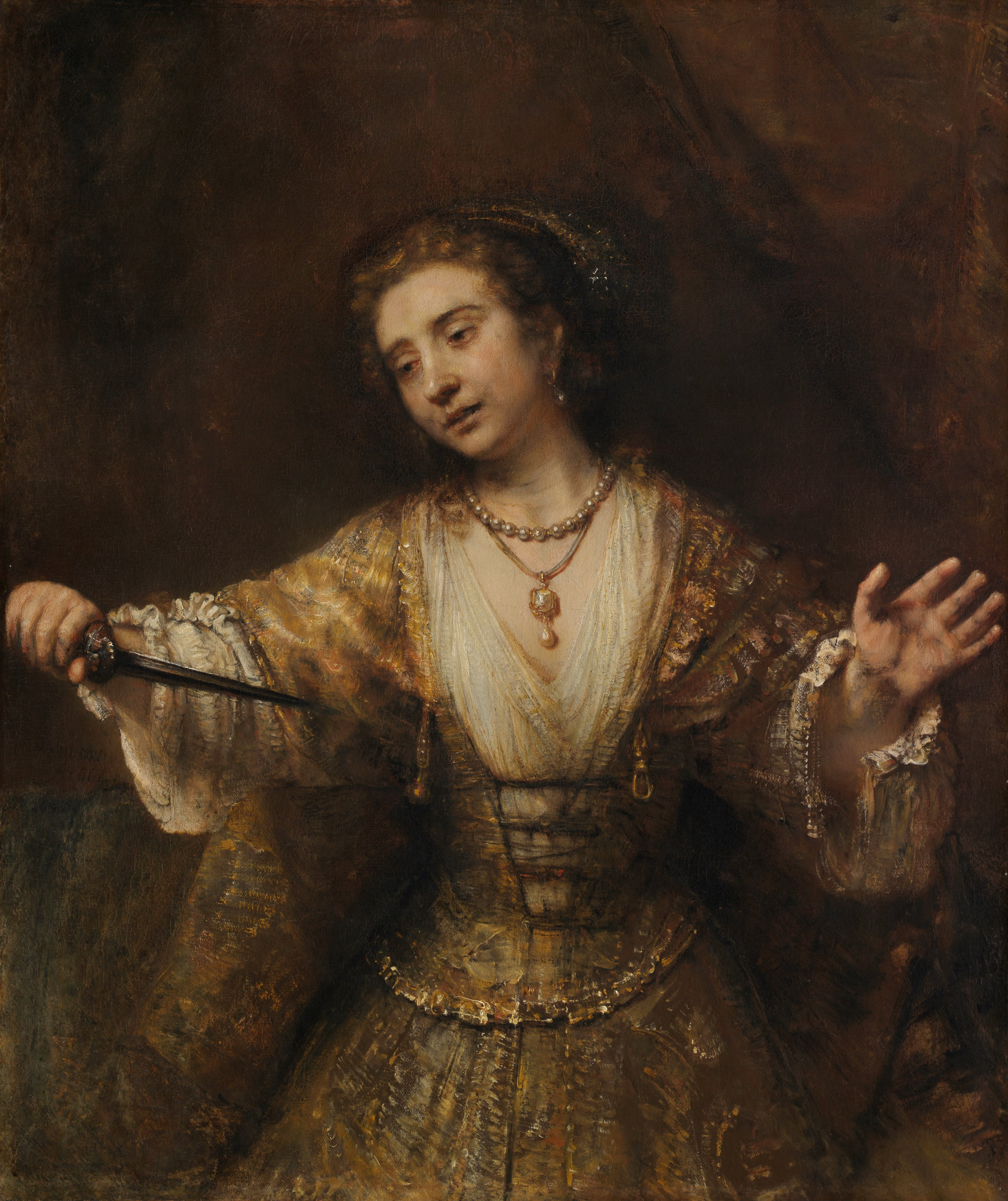

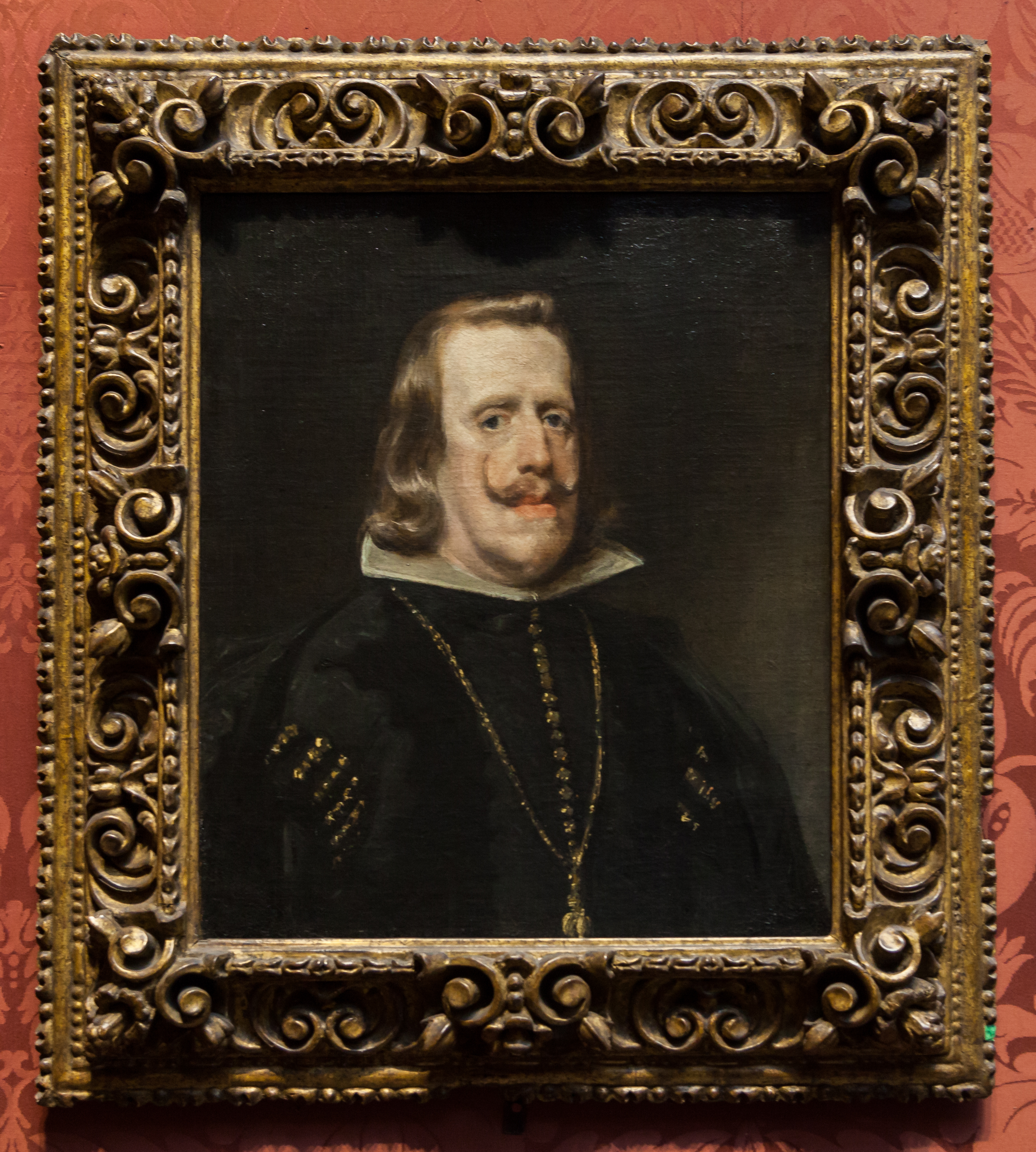

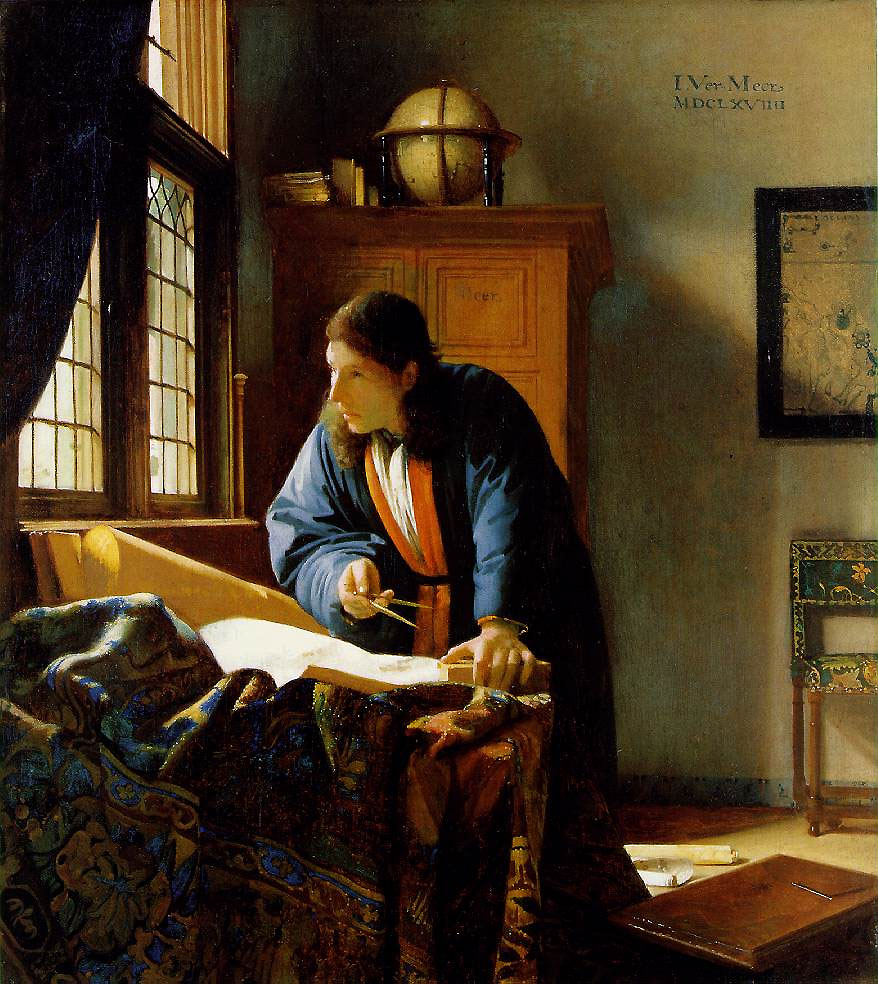

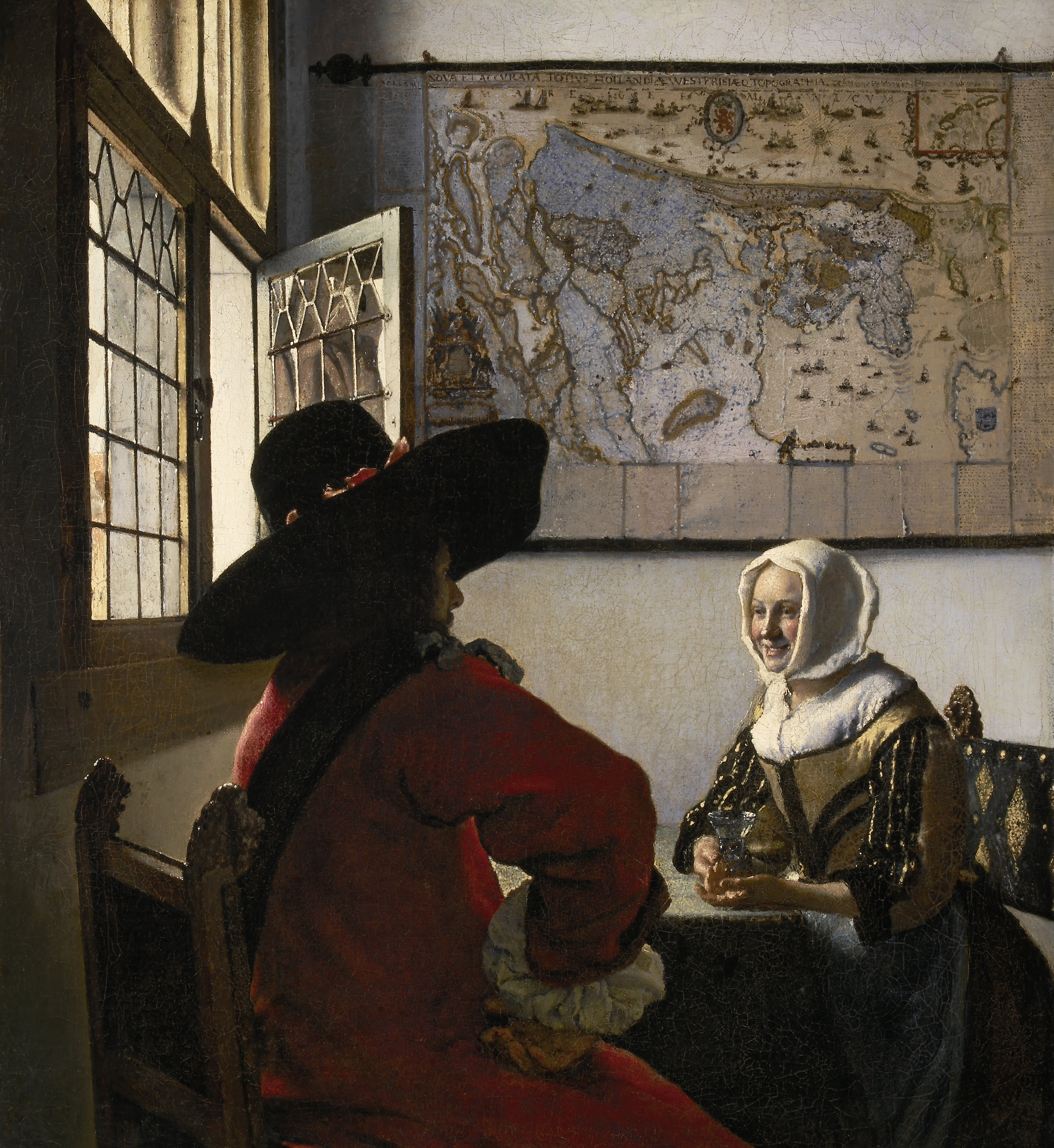

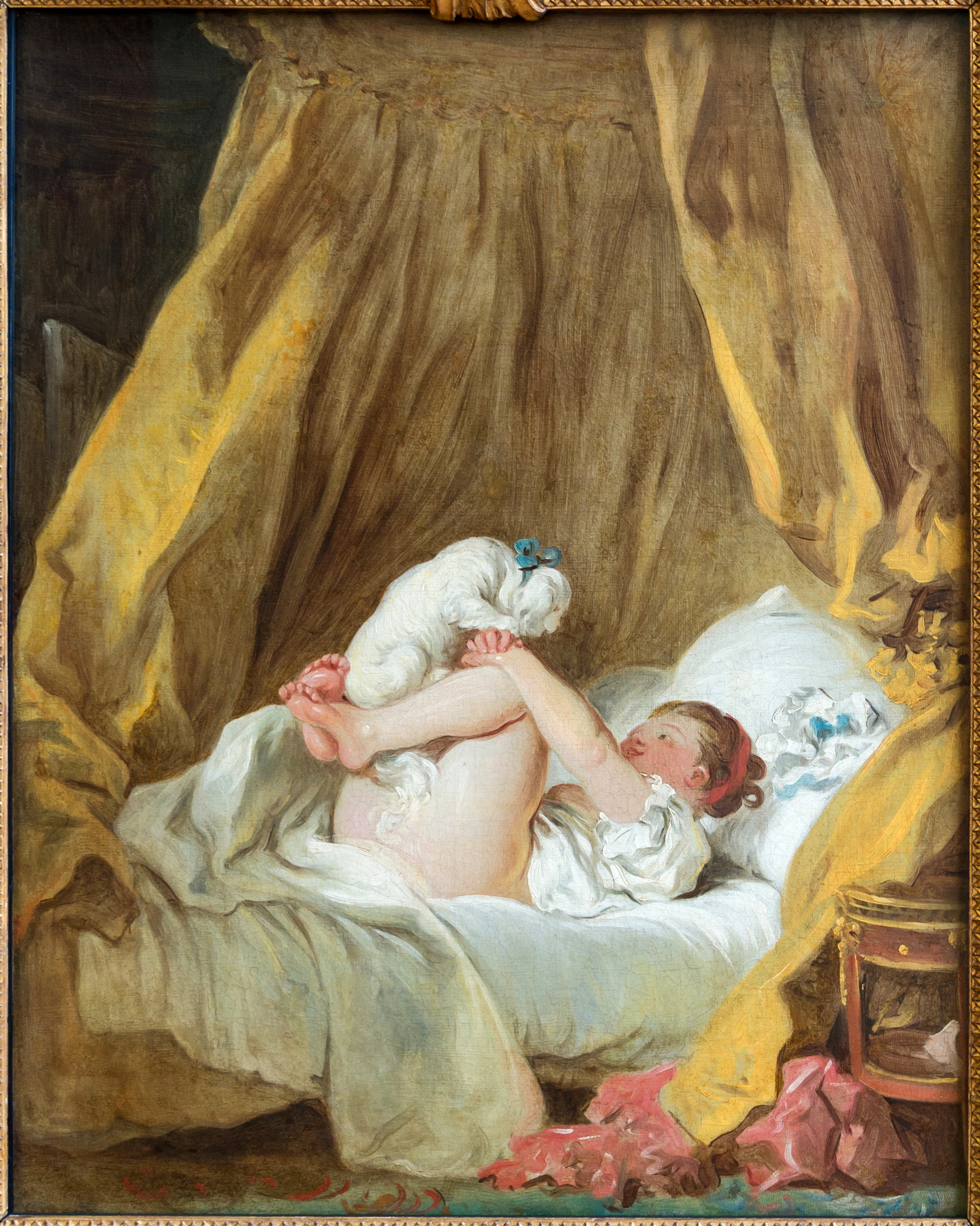

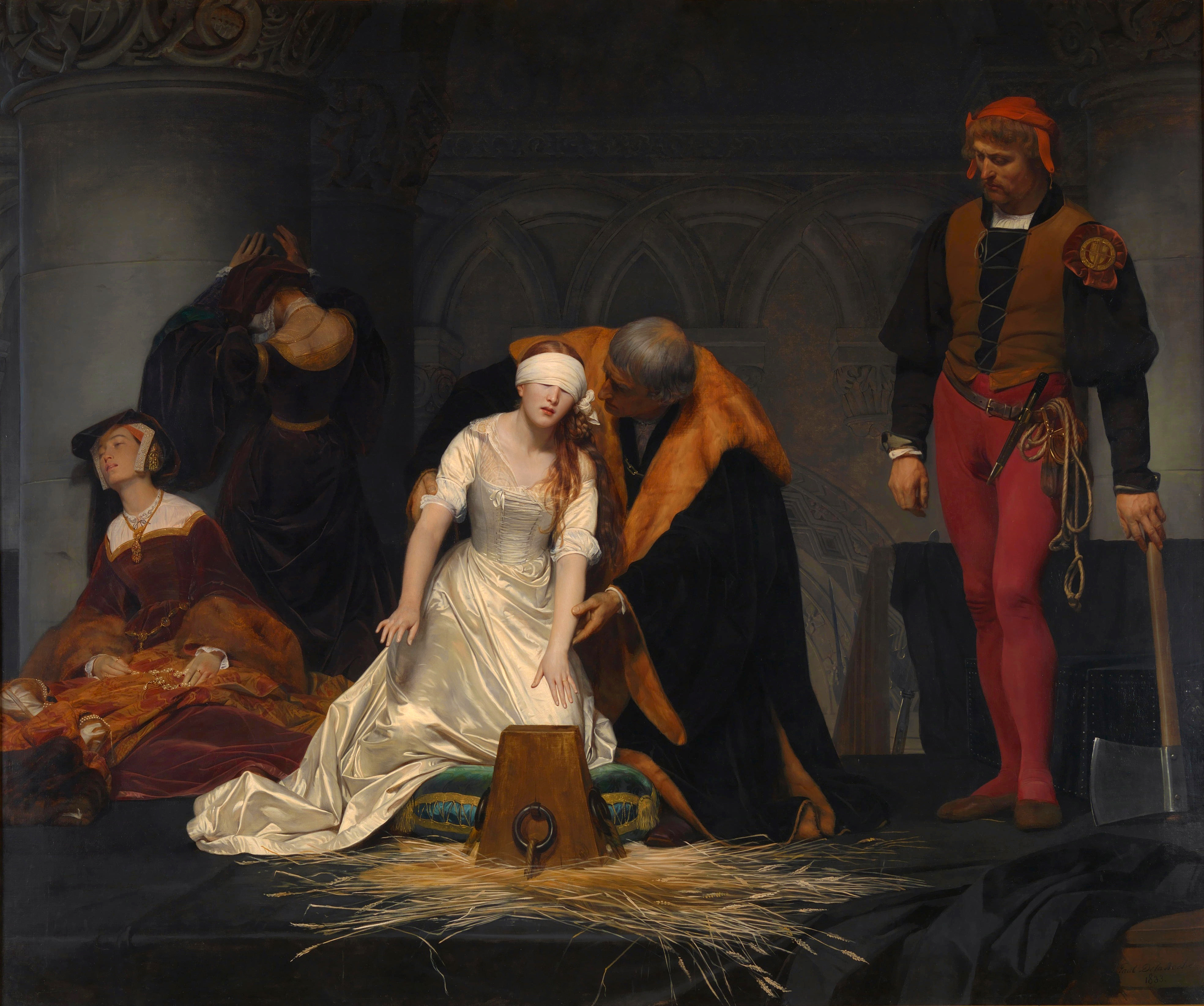

=== Decorative arts ===
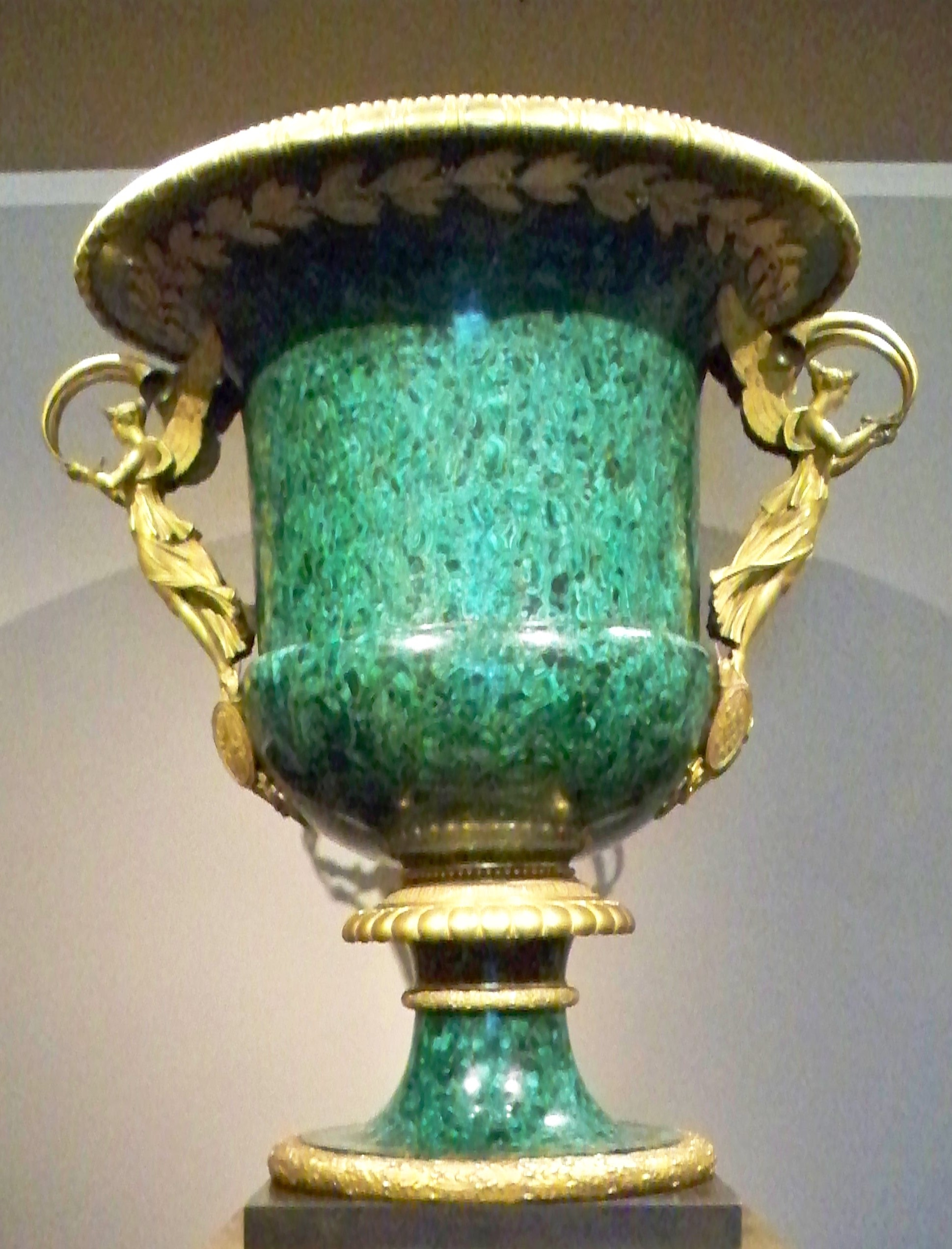
The Demidov Vase

- Pierre-Philippe Thomire, The Demidov Vase (1819), in the Empire style, malachite in a gilt bronze, 161.9 cm (63.7 in) high, commissioned by Nicolay. New York, Metropolitan Museum of Art.
- Clodion, Monumental urn, marble, 131.5 cm × 97.1 cm (51.8 in × 38.2 in), 1782, acquired by Anatole. Washington, D.C., National Gallery of Art.
- Clodion, Monumental urn, marble, 132 cm × 97 cm (52 in × 38 in), 1782, acquired by Anatole. Washington, D.C., National Gallery of Art.
- Arms and armour, now in the Wallace Collection in London, UK.
- The Polish coronation sword Szczerbiec.

=== Sculptures ===
- Lorenzo Bartolini, La Table aux Amours, also known as the Demidov Table, marble, 137.2 cm × 162.6 cm (54.0 in × 64.0 in), commissioned by Anatole in 1845. New York, Metropolitan Museum of Art.
- Antonio Canova, Madame Mère, marble.
