= Aurora Karamzin =

Finnish philanthropist (1808–1902)

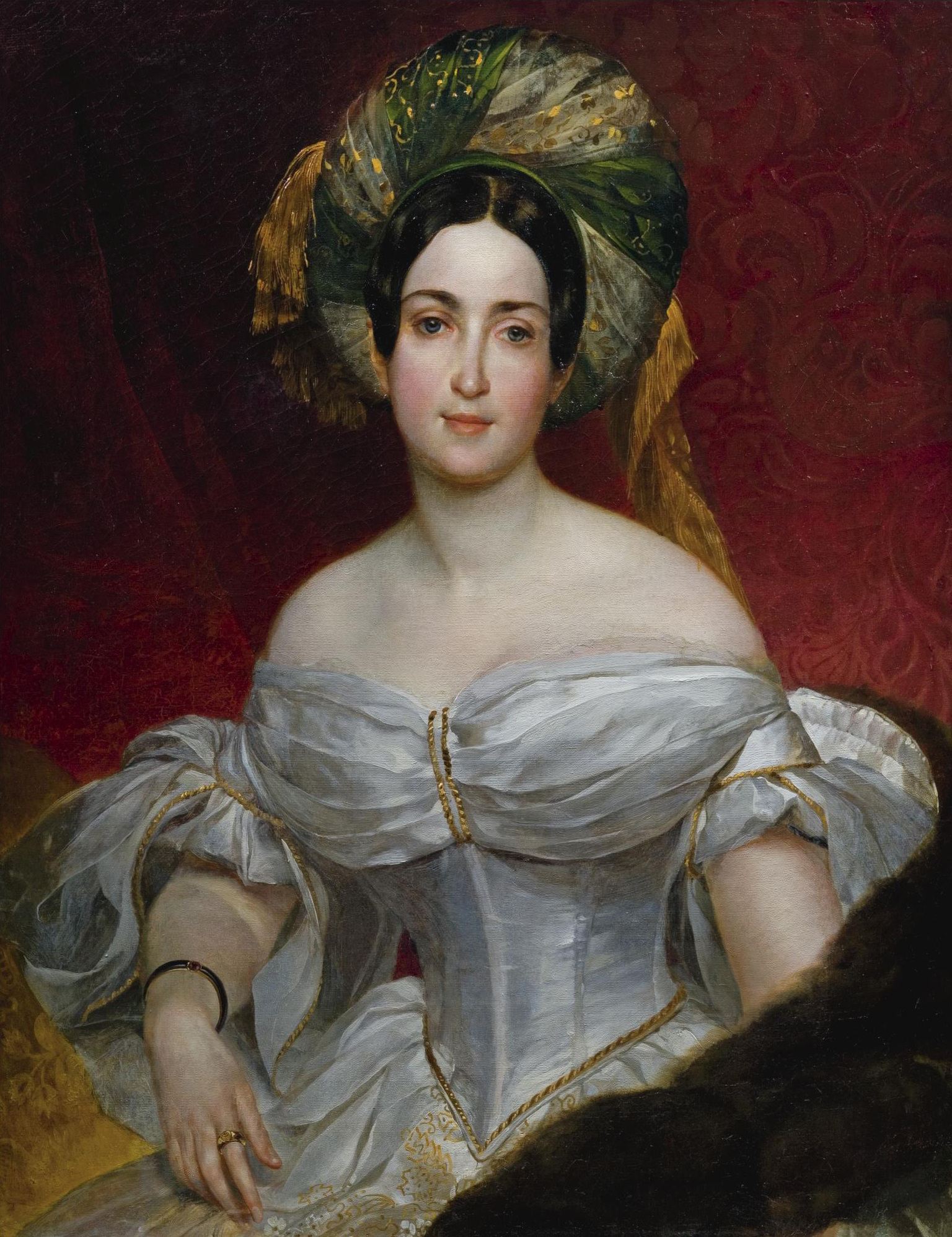
- 1837 portrait
- Born: Eva Aurora Charlotta Stjernvall; 1 / 7 August 1808; Saari Manor, Ulvila, Finland, Kingdom of Sweden
- Died: 13 May 1902 (aged 93); Helsinki, Grand Duchy of Finland, Russian Empire
- Noble family: Stjernvall
- Spouses: Pavel Nikolayevich Demidov; Colonel Andrei Karamzin
- Issue: Pavel Pavlovich Demidov
- Father: Carl Johan Stjernvall
- Mother: Baroness Eva Gustava von Willebrand

Eva Aurora Charlotta Karamzin (née Stjernvall; 1 or 7 August 1808 – 13 May 1902) was a Finnish philanthropist and a lady-in-waiting in the Imperial Court of Russia. She is better known as Princess Aurora Demidova and Aurora Karamzina, titles that were acquired after her first and second marriages, to Pavel Nikolayevich Demidov and Andrei Karamzin, respectively.

== Early life ==
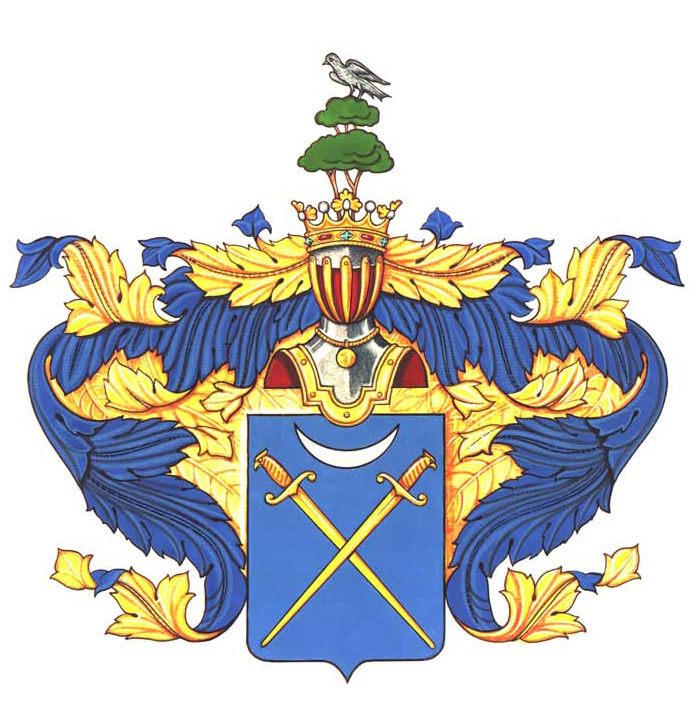
Coat of arms of the Karamzin family

Karamzin was born on 1 August, 1808 at the Saari Manor in Ulvila, Finland, into a Swedish-speaking noble family. She was the daughter of lieutenant colonel Carl Johan Stjernvall and his wife, Baroness Eva Gustava von Willebrand, daughter of Baron Ernst Gustaf von Willebrand and his wife Wendla Gustava Wright. Through her mother, Karamzin was related to Adolf Fredrik Munck and Carl Gustaf Emil Mannerheim. She had an older brother, Emil, and two younger sisters, Emilie and Alexandra (Aline). Emil later became the Finnish Minister of State and a Baron. Emilie married Count Vladimir Musin-Pushkin; one of her daughters was Marie Linder, who became one of the first Finnish female writers. Alexandra became the second wife of 1st Baron of Seisal José Maurício Correia Henriques, later 1st Viscount of Seisal and 1st Count of Seisal.

Karamzin's father Carl Johan Stjernvall was a high official in the Grand Duchy of Finland, becoming the First Governor of the Viipuri Province in 1812. He acted in that role for three years before his death in 1815. The following year, Karamzin's mother married Procurator Carl Johan Walleen (1781-1867), who had also succeeded Stjernvall as the Governor of the Viipuri Province. Through this union, Karamzin had three half-brothers, one of whom (Vladimir Alfons) became a Major General and a Governor.

Shortly after the death of her father, eight-year-old Karamzin moved to live with her aunt Minette (Wilhelmina Albertina) von Willebrand (1782–1824) in St. Petersburg. Aunt Minette was married to procurator Adolf Fredrik von Willebrand, who was a member of the Committee for Finnish Affairs. In St. Petersburg, Karamzin learned court etiquette and became fluent in French; in addition to her native tongue Swedish, she also spoke Russian and Finnish. She moved back to Finland at the age of twelve, after which she was educated by a German governess.

== Life ==
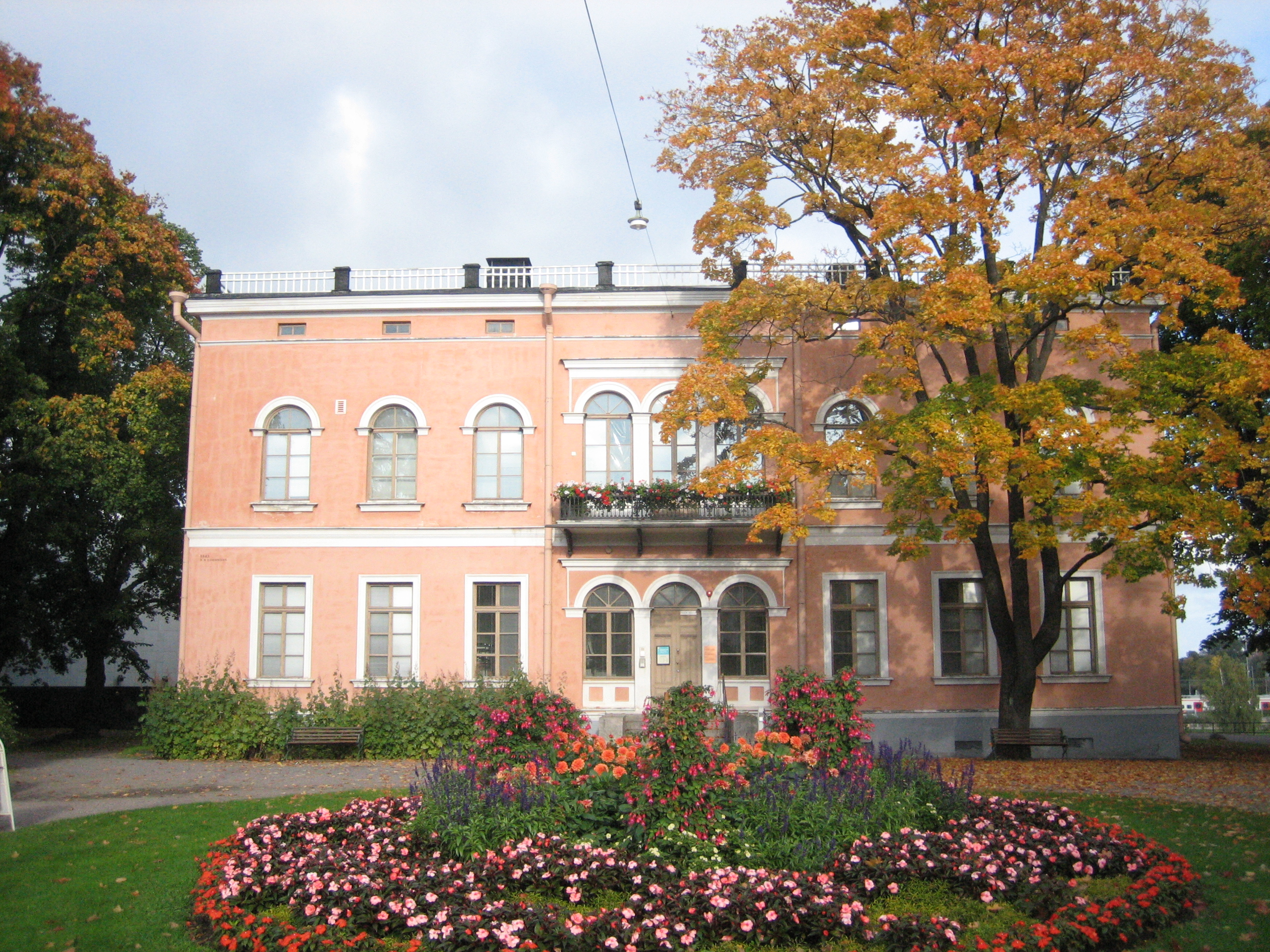
Villa Hakasalmi manor house in the centre of Helsinki where Aurora Karamzin lived most of her life. Now a museum.

Aurora was appointed as a lady-in-waiting to Empress Alexandra Fedorovna the elder (consort to Tsar Nicholas I of Russia), and a lady of the bedchamber of Empress Alexandra Feodorovna the younger and Empress Maria Feodorovna.

She was made a dame of the Order of Saint Catherine, the highest honour for ladies in Imperial Russia. Evgeny Baratynsky dedicated a poem to her, as he did to her sister Countess Emilie.

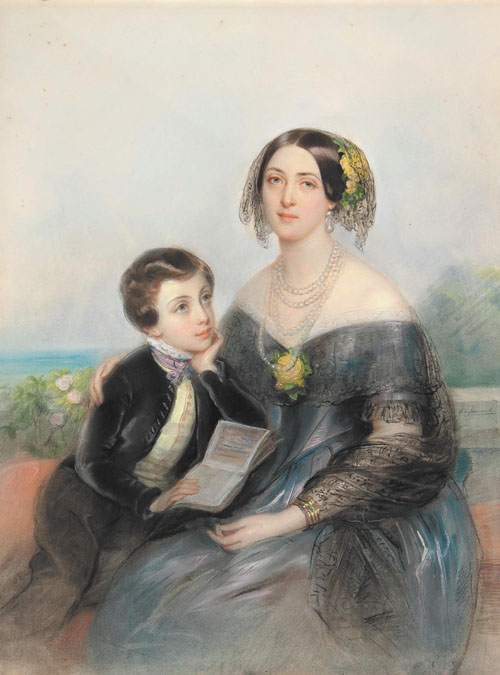
Aurora Demidova with son Paul by L. H. de Liomenil, 1840s. Sold by the Demidoff family at Christie's in New York, 2007.

In Helsinki on 9 January 1836, she married Pavel Nikolayevich Demidov. In 1846, after Demidov's death, she remarried to Colonel Andrei Karamzin.

After the death of Aurora's second husband, she occupied herself with the practical matters of her Järvenperä (Träskända) manor in Espoo, Finland and with her growing interest in charity. Karamzin used the immense wealth inherited from her first husband to create benevolent institutions in Helsinki, such as schools, public kitchens and the Deaconess Institution of Helsinki fi in 1867, which was the first institution in Finland for educating nurses. She was considered a great benefactor in many cities such as Saint Petersburg and Florence.

Her native language was Swedish and she was fluent in French and spoke also Russian and Finnish.

Karamzin's only child was Pavel Pavlovich Demidov (1839–1885). In 1870, Pavel succeeded his childless uncle, Anatoly Nikolaievich Demidov, as the 2nd Prince of San Donato.

Her granddaughter and namesake Princess Aurora Pavlovna Demidova married Arsen Karađorđević, Prince of Serbia and became the mother of the Yugoslav regent, Prince Paul of Yugoslavia. Demidova's granddaughter is Princess Elizabeth of Yugoslavia, now living in Serbia, and the mother of Catherine and Christina Oxenberg.

She died aged 93 in Helsinki on 13 May 1902.

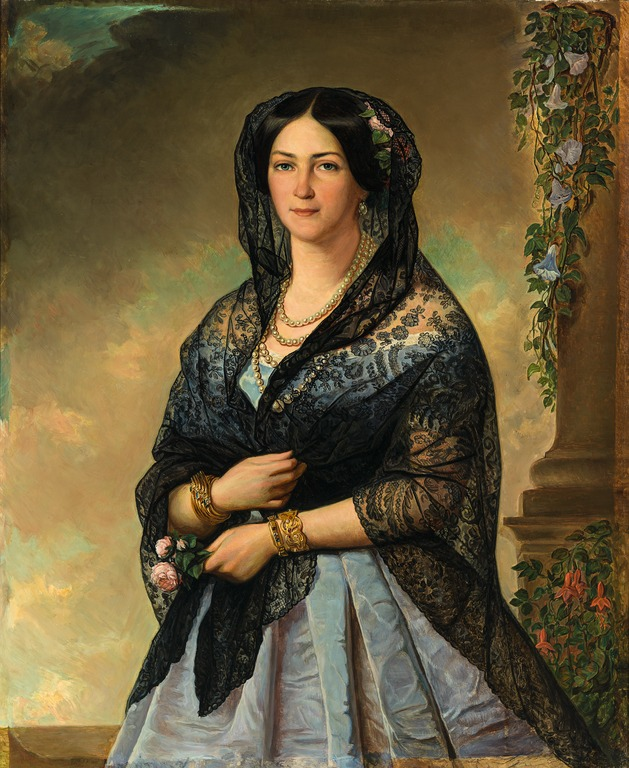
Aurora Karamzin, by Alexis Joseph Perignon, 1853. The Collections of the National Museum of Finland, Helsinki.

== Places named after Aurora Karamzin in the Helsinki metropolitan area ==
- Aurora Street (Helsinki, Töölö)
- Aurora Hospital (Helsinki)
- Aurora Hall, (Helsinki Deaconess Institute)
- Karamzinin Street (Helsinki, Töölö)
- Auroragate (street in Espoo, Järvenperä)
- Aurora Karamzin Park (Espoo)
- Aurora Kindegarden (Espoo)
- Aurora School (Espoo)
- Aurora House (Espoo)
- Aurora Chapell (Espoo)
- Aurora reception home (Espoo)
- Karamzin School (Espoo)
- Art House Little Aurora (Espoo)
