= Villa San Donato =

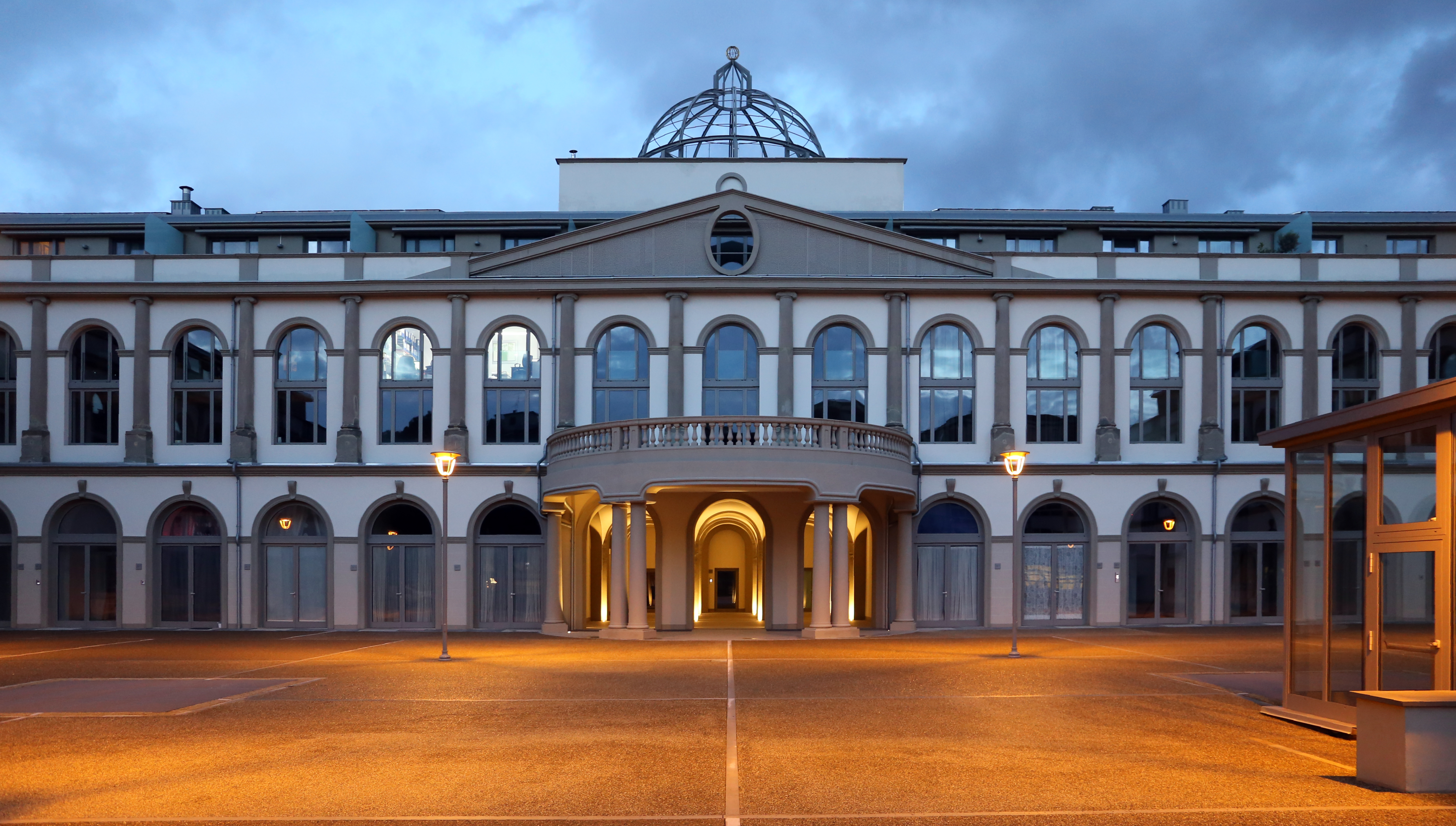
Villa San Donato

The Villa San Donato is a Palladian palace built by Russian industrialist Nikolay Demidov on 42 hectares of marshland to the north of Florence at Polverosa which he had bought from the Catholic church, after he was made Russia's ambassador to the court of Tuscany. The first stone was laid on 27 June 1827 and construction was completed in 1831. It includes an estates with rivers, lakes, churches, a menagerie, a silk factory, a zoo, gardens and a railway. The designs were by Giovan Battista Silvestri, architect to the Uffizi.

Besides vast private apartments, it includes a private 14-room museum built to contain the huge Demidov collection. The ceiling of the dome over the central rotonda has a fresco of 1827 by Domenico Morelli, repainted in 1841 by the French painter Jean Baptiste Fortuné de Fournier. It was seriously damaged in the Second World War. The adjacent Demidoff Chapel of San Donato is now owned by the Church of Christ.

== Gallery ==
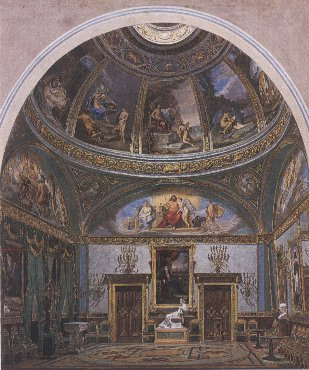
Central rotonda

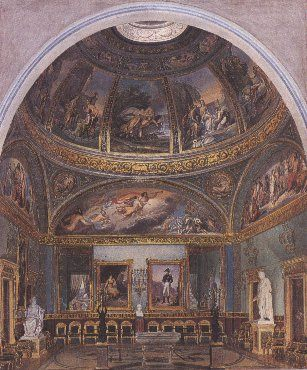
Central rotonda

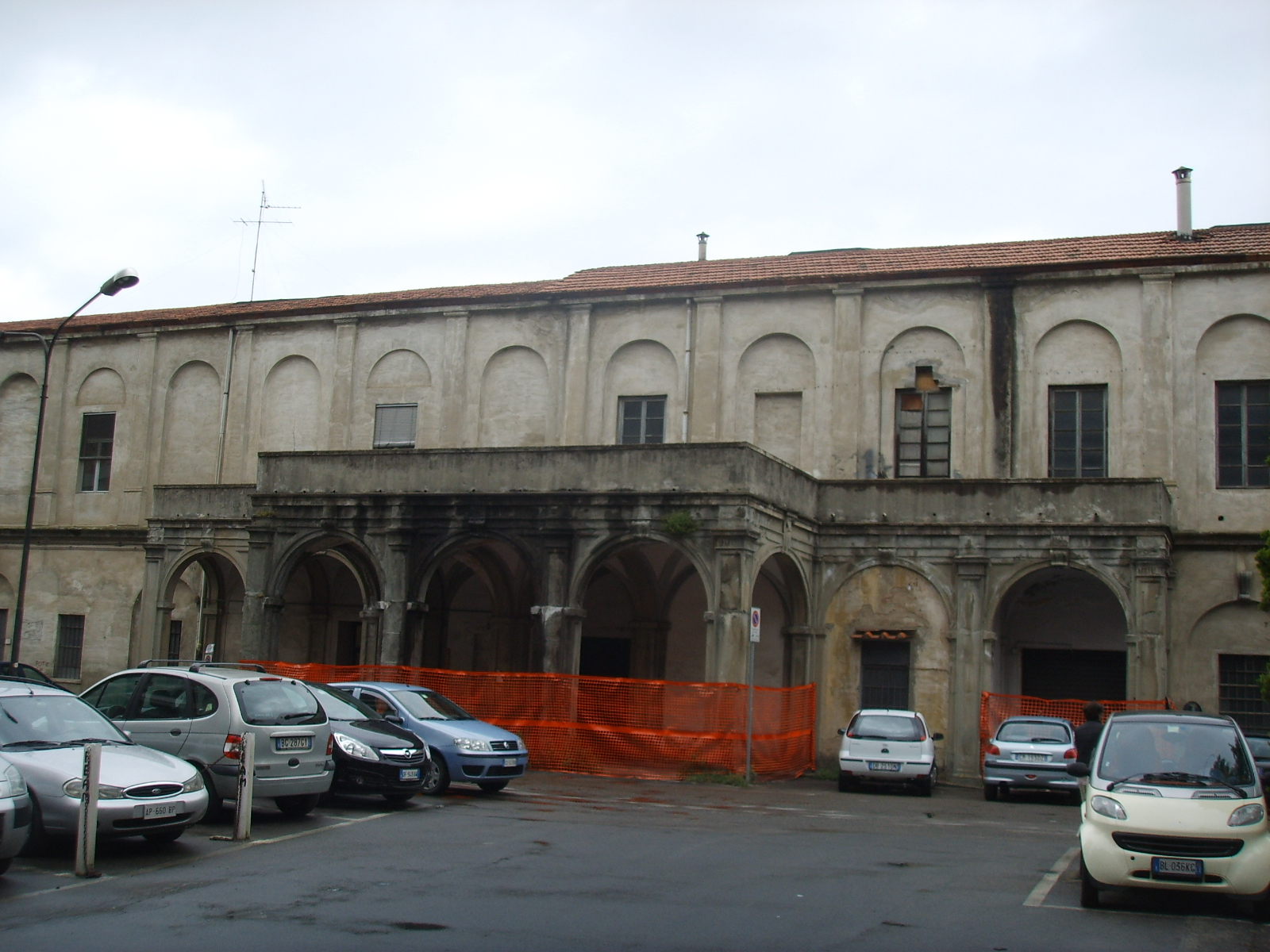
Loggia (2007)

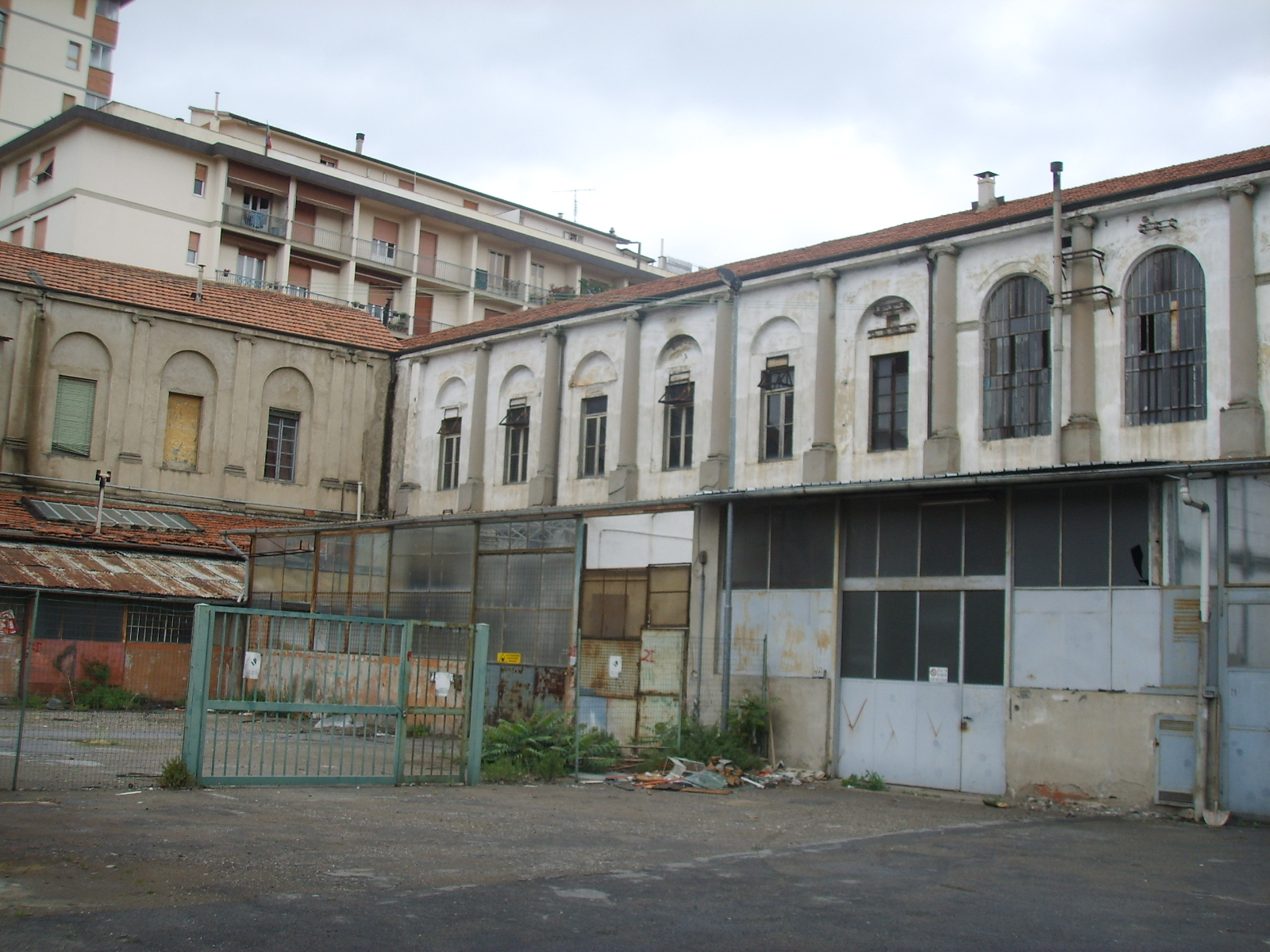
Villa San Donato (2007)
