= Monument to Nicola Demidoff, Florence =

Coordinates: 43°45′55″N 11°15′36″E

The Monument to Nicola Demidoff or Nikolai Demidov is a 19th-century outdoor sculptural monument located in "Piazza Demidoff" between Lungarno Serristori and Via dei Renai, along the southern bank of the Arno River, in the zone of San Niccolo in the Oltrarno section of the city of Florence, region of Tuscany, Italy.

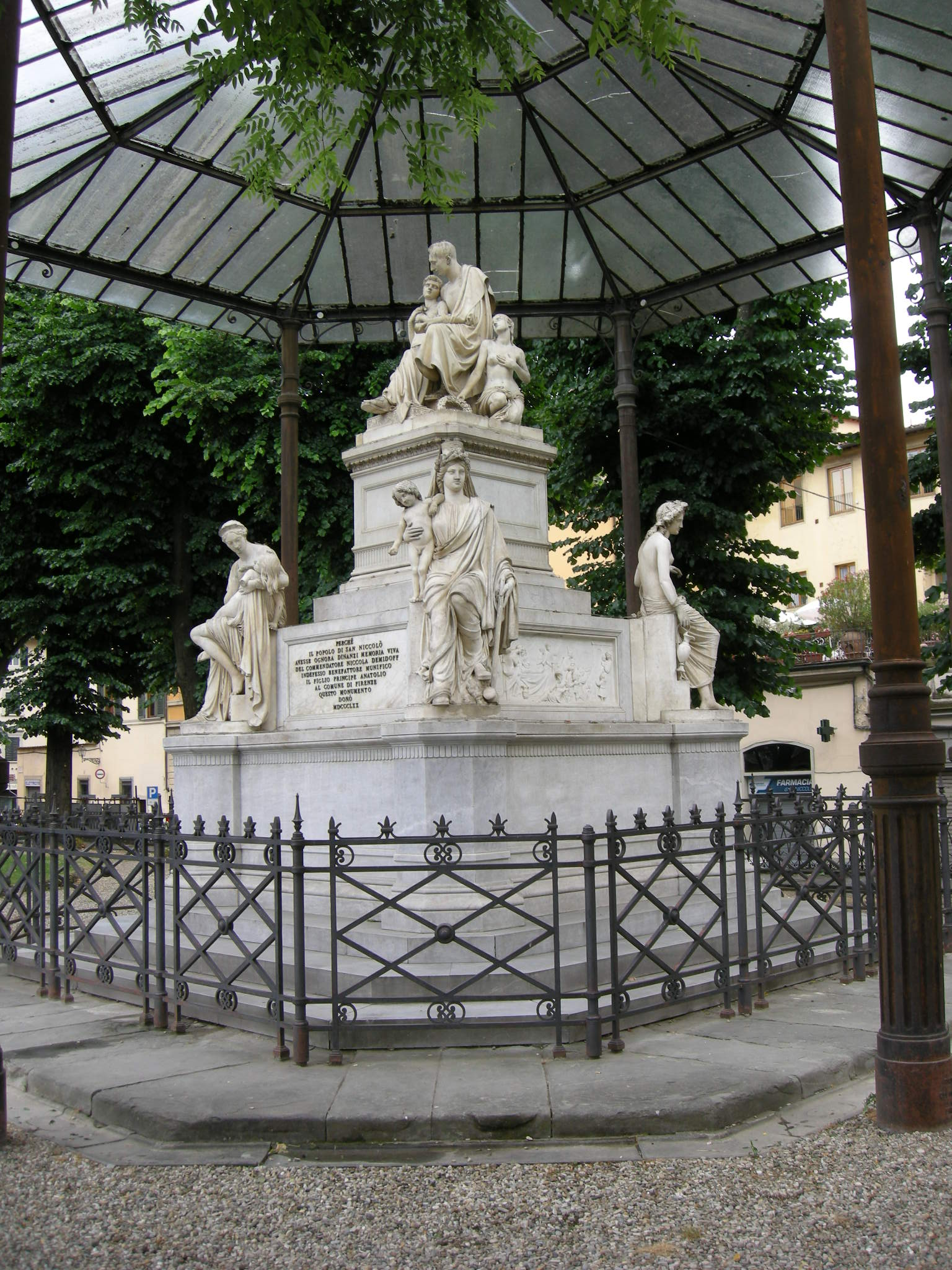
Monument to Nicola Demidoff

== History ==
It was commissioned by Nikolai's sons, Paul and Anatoly Nicolayevich Demidov, to honor their father, the Russian statesman, diplomat, and later émigré to Florence, Nikolai Nikitich Demidov (1773–1828). The Count Demidov had become a prominent patron, philanthropist, and businessman in Florence. The son Anatoly commissioned the design and statuary from the sculptor Lorenzo Bartolini. Bartolini worked on the monument from 1830 until his death in 1850. After his death, his pupil Pasquale Romanelli continued the monument until it was inaugurated in 1870. Initially the monument was planned for the Demidovs' Villa San Donato, but Paul gifted it to the commune. Florence, seeking to update itself as the capital of Italy, was expanding its public parks. The architect Giuseppe Poggi utilized the monument for this park that he had landscaped just south of the Palazzo Serristori. The Count Demidov had once resided in that palace.

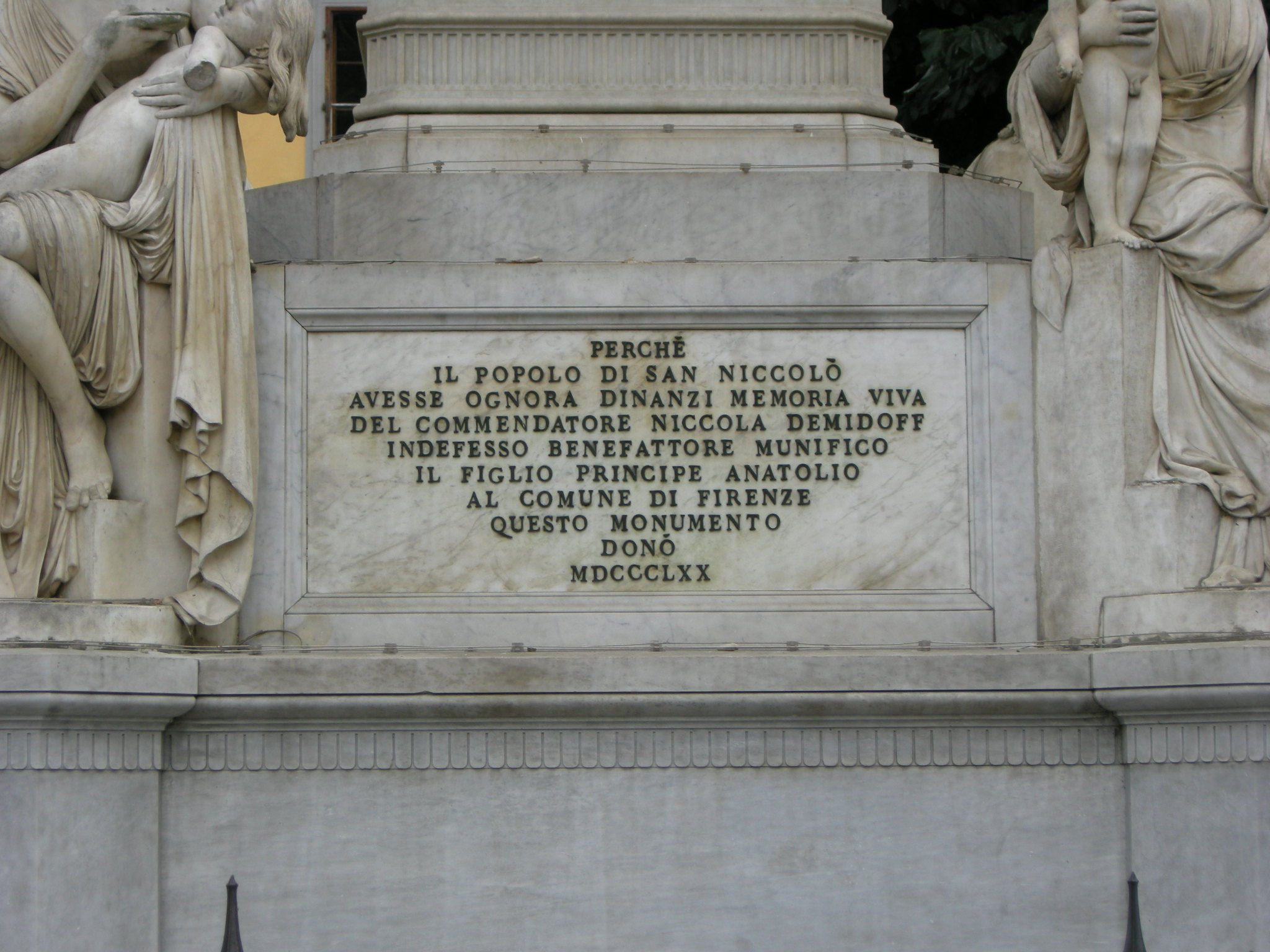
Inscription on monument

The main statuary group shows Nikolai embracing his son, while Gratitude lies by their side. At the four corners are allegorical groups depicting Mercy, Siberia with the god Pluto, the Muse of Festivals, and the Truth as it revealed to Art. Demidov had made some of his fortune with Siberian mines. The child in the group at the northwest corner has lost his marble arm. Below the statues a bas-relief depicts the death of Demidov. At the rear is the coat of arms of the family. Giuseppe Martelli designed the roof, which protects the statue.
