= Pavel Nikolaievich Demidov =

Russian nobleman (1798–1840)

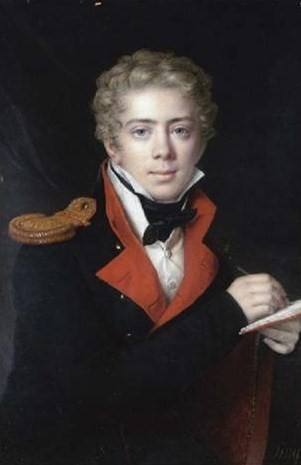
Pavel Nikolaievich Demidov at the age of nineteen. By Jean-Baptiste Singry, 1817.

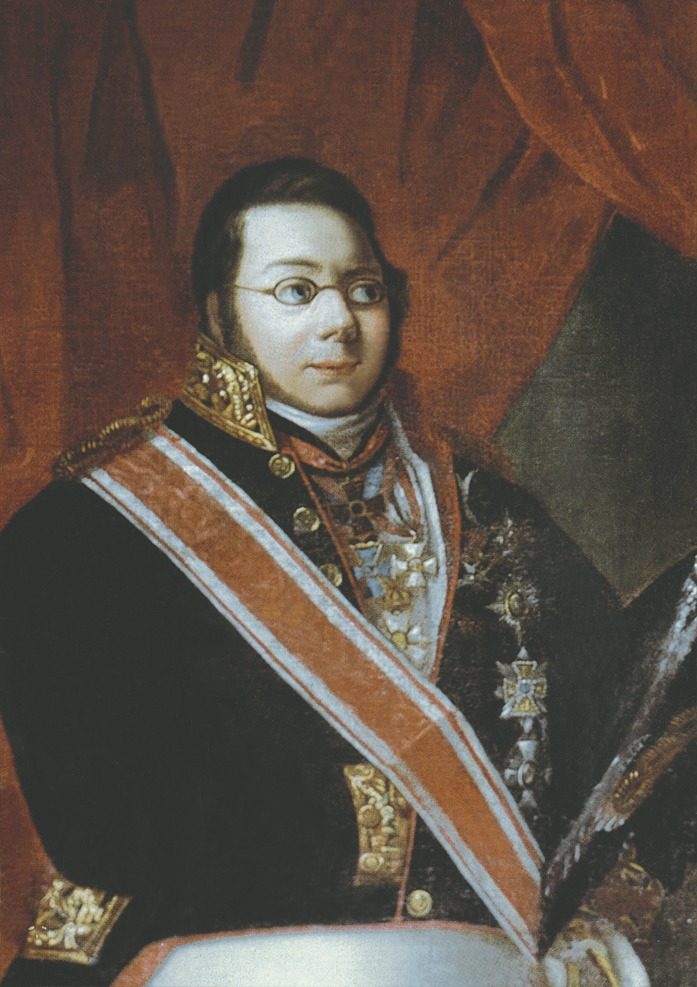
Posthumous portrait of Pavel Nikolaievich Demidov. P. P. Vedenetsky, 1841. Nizhny Tagil Museum-Reserve.

Pavel (called Paul) Nikolaievich Demidov (Russian: Павел Николаевич Демидов; 6 September 1798 Saint Petersburg - 25 March 1840 Mainz) was a Russian nobleman of the Demidov dynasty, philanthropist and industrialist. His father was Ober-Chamberlain Nikolai Nikitich Demidov (1773-1828) and his mother Baroness Elizaveta Alexandrovna Stroganova (1779-1818). He was the second eldest of four children, two of which lived to the adult age. Most of his childhood was spent in Paris, where also his parents preferred to live.

== Family ==
The ancestor of the Demidov family, Paul Nikolaievich's great-great-grandfather Nikita Demidovich Antufyev (1656–1725) was a blacksmith and a weapon-maker in Tula in the 17th century. He had gained the favour of Tsar Peter the Great with his well manufactured pistols and granted rights over the mines and foundries on the eastern slopes of the Urals, as well as to the thousands of serfs who toiled in them. Of these, Nizhny Tagil was the most important area. The mines produced iron, copper, gold and platinum, as well as valuable types of stone and malachite and gemstones. The riches of the family grew into astronomical dimensions.

During the reign of Empress Catherine II, the Demidov family had their own army and they minted their own money. The Demidov dynasty had a huge impact on the development of the Urals and Siberian regions: industry, mining, and mineral exploration. Members of the family also made large donations to charity and promotion of arts, including the construction of schools and hospitals.

== Philanthropy ==
Under the management of Pavel Nikolaievich, the Demidov company employees made redundant due to old age, received a life pension which was half of their salary. 5,000 rubles was annually allocated "for benefits to the crippled and infirm servants and artisans in cases of need." In 1829, he donated 500,000 rubles to help the widows and orphans of officers and soldiers who died during the Russo-Turkish war of 1828-1829. For this donation, Pavel Nikolaievich was granted the title of Chamberlain of the Court of His Imperial Majesty Nicholas I.

Due to lack of public funds, he built four hospitals during his governorship in early 1830's in Kursk for cholera patients with his own money. He also donated 50,000 rubles to help victims of cholera in Moscow. With his brother Anatoly, he took part in the construction of the Nikolaev Children's Hospital in Saint Petersburg, contributing 100,000 rubles.

In 1831 he founded the Demidov Prize, decided by the Russian Academy of Sciences, that was given annually till 1865.

Abroad he donated notable sums to the Convent of Sankt Elizabeth in Linz, Austria, Comédie-Française in Paris, the poor of Berlin, the widows and orphans of French soldiers, who died in Africa. He provided the funds needed to complete the Cathedral of Santa Maria del Fiore in Florence. The Demidov coat of arms is seen in the facade of the church.

== Life ==
As the eldest son of Count Nikolai Nikitich Demidov and Baroness Elisabeta Alexandrovna Stroganova, he lived with his father, first in Vienna at the Russian embassy, and then in Paris, where he studied at the prestigious Lycée Napoléon, in a six-year course at the high school level. He returned to Russia with his family in 1812 at the age of fourteen.

He fought as a young cadet in his father's own privately funded infantry regiment and received his baptism of fire at the battle of Borodino in 1812. After the war he entered the Chevalier Guards regiment. In 1828 he purchased the famous Sancy diamond. He received his regimental discharge in 1831 with the rank of captain, at which time he entered civil service as governor of the province of Kursk. As his illness got worse, in 1834 he entered service in the Ministry of the Exterior as Imperial Master of the Hunt, later State Councillor.

He was ill and tired of life at the age of 38, suffering from rheumatism. He was capricious and nervous, demanding in nature like a spoiled child, those who knew him said.

Pavel Nikolaievich's father and youngest brother Anatoly had already settled abroad. They gathered art treasures in their castles in France and Italy and set up nursing homes and hospitals. In Russia, this export of property to foreign countries was condemned. The general perception was that his bride Aurora Stjernvall was hoped to persuade her husband to return to Russia and manage his property wisely and for the benefit of his own country and emperor. The younger brother, Anatoly was already considered a hopeless case. He spent a princely life in Paris and in the castle of San Donato near Florence, and had, with his whims and outrage, expelled his wife, Princess Mathilde Bonaparte, and donated money recklessly wherever he choose.

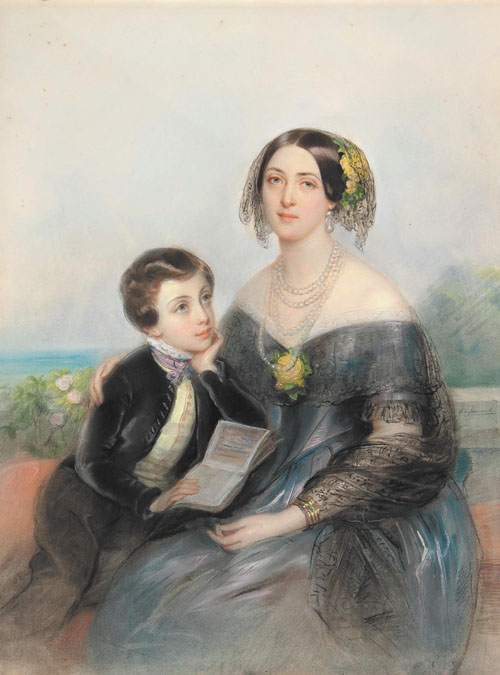
Aurora Demidova with son Paul by L. H. de Liomenil, 1840s. Sold by the Demidoff family at Christie's auction in New York, 2007.

In Helsinki on 9 January 1836 Paul married the well-known society beauty and maid-of-honour to Her Majesty the Empress Alexandra Feodorovna, Baroness Aurora Stjernvall (1808–1902). The bridegroom was so ill from rheumatism that he had to be carried to the altar. The morning gifts for both the young wife and her hometown were princely. Helsinki's orphan girls' craft school and the boys' Lancaster school, received a total of 30,000 rubles, and another 50,000 rubles as a dowry fund for well learning girls. The bride received a gold jewelry box with the world's seventh largest diamond attached to a platinum chain, the famous Le Sancy.

Difficulties arose soon after the wedding. Demidov fell ill and refused to leave for Saint Petersburg. The court life disgusted him as much as financial matters. The couple spent almost their entire life together - though leading separate lives - about three and a half years at various health spas in Germany. Wife Aurora was allowed to visit Saint Petersburg alone to show her respect for the emperor Nicholas I in accordance with the etiquette and, no doubt, her genuine gratitude.

When their son Paul was born in October 1839, Demidov had already agreed to a plan of returning to Saint Petersburg, where the palace on Bolshaya Morskaya Street was being renovated. Before the following summer, however, Demidov's health finally collapsed, and he died suddenly in Mainz in 1840 of heart failure. He was buried in Saint Petersburg, where from his son Paul transferred his father's remains in 1875 to the family mausoleum in Nizhny Tagil in the Vyysko-Nikolskaya Church (russian: Выйско-Никольской церкви), where also the ancestor, gunsmith Nikita Demidov is buried. Pavel Nikolaievich's tomb memorial by James Pradier was erected in 1844.

Pavel and Aurora had one child, Pavel Pavlovich Demidov, 2nd Prince of San Donato (1839–1885), whose daughter Aurora was mother of Prince Paul of Yugoslavia.

Pavel also had an illegitimate son Nikolai (b. 1829) from a relationship with the Demidov Lyon trade representative's daughter Anette Bodin.
