= Portrait of Mathilde Bonaparte =

Painting by Édouard Dubufe

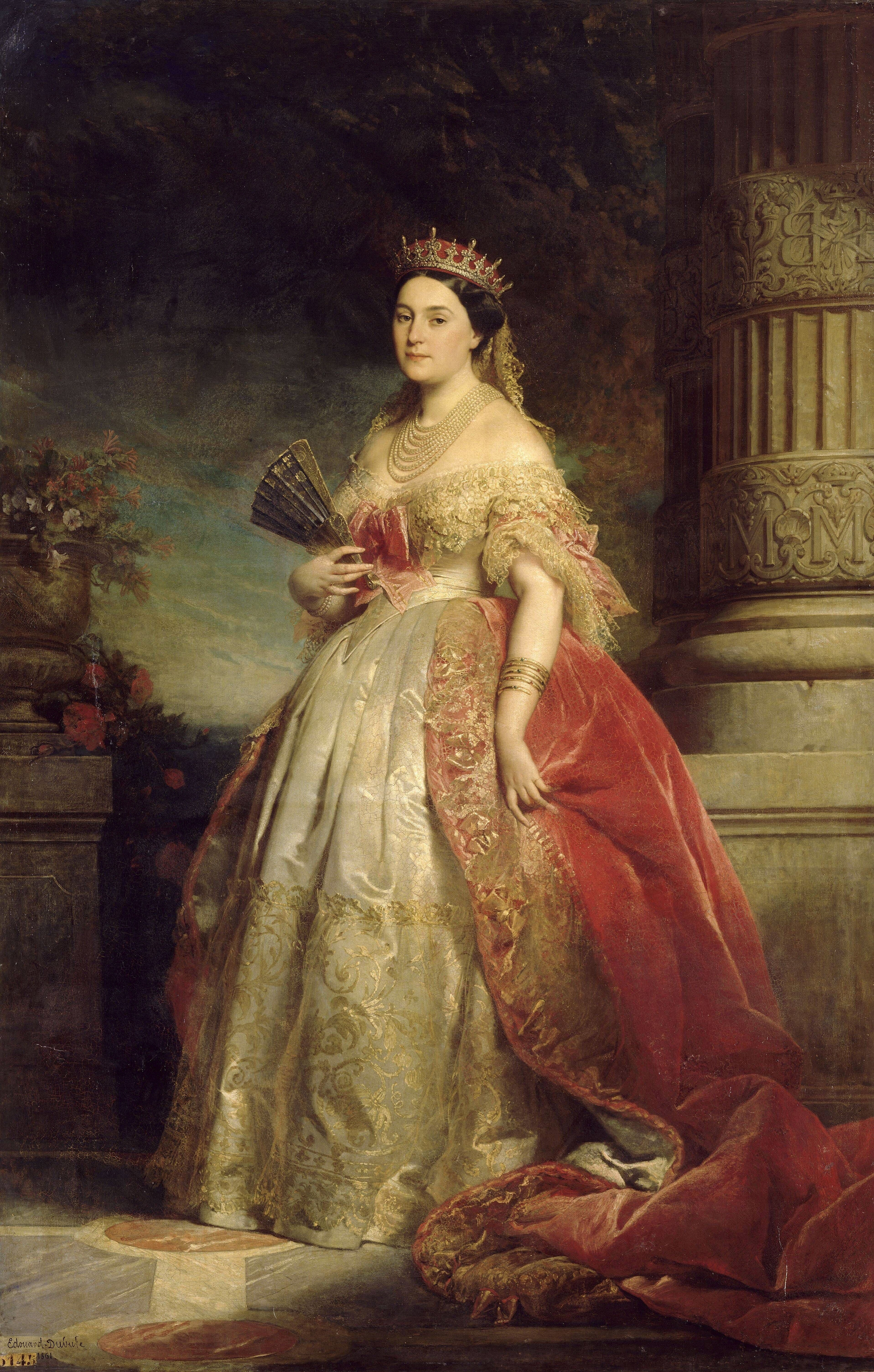
- Artist: Édouard Dubufe
- Year: 1861
- Type: Oil on canvas, portrait painting
- Dimensions: 219 cm × 143 cm (86 in × 56 in)
- Location: Palace of Versailles, Versailles

Portrait of Mathilde Bonaparte is an 1861 portrait painting by the French artist Édouard Dubufe. It depicts Mathilde Bonaparte, a member of the Bonaparte dynasty, at full-length in court dress. Dubufe chose a very classical composition for the painting.

The daughter of Jérôme Bonaparte She had once been engaged to her cousin who by 1861 was the Emperor of France Napoleon III. Although the prospective marriage fell through she subsequently became the wife of the Russian nobleman Anatoly Demidov, 1st Prince of San Donato and a prominent figure in Parisian society as the lover of the influential Émilien de Nieuwerkerke. Dubufe was a noted portaitst of the Second Empire era.

The picture was exhibited at the Salon of 1861 held in Paris and was presented to the French state by the sitter a few years later. Today it is part of the collection of the Museum of French History at the Palace of Versailles, having been acquired in 1968.

== Bibliography ==
- Kühn, Joachim. Prinzessin Mathilde Bonaparte; Geschichte einer Weltdame, 1820-1862. Deutsche Verlagsgesellschaft für Politik und Geschichte, 1929.
- Smith, William Herbert. Napoleon III; The Pursuit of Prestige. Collins & Brown, 1991.
- Watson, Peter. The French Mind: 400 Years of Romance, Revolution and Renewal. Simon & Schuster, 2022.
