= Villa di Quarto =

Historic Landmark Designated Villa in Florence, Italy

Coordinates: 43°49′7.10″N 11°14′29.63″E

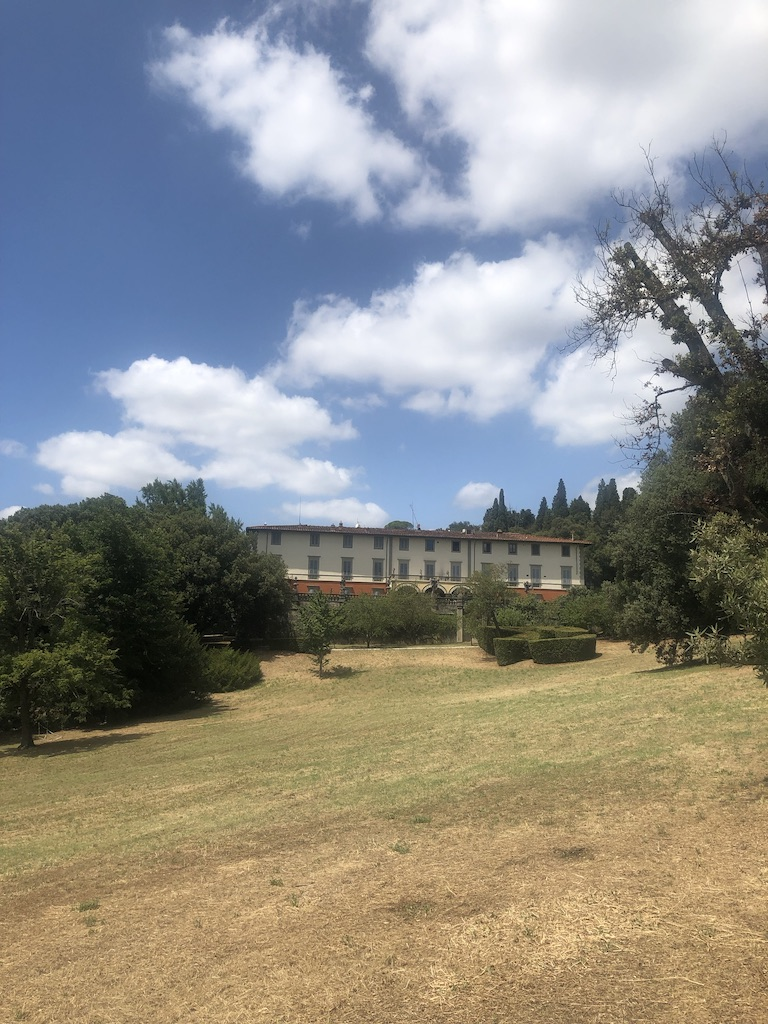
Villa di Quarto

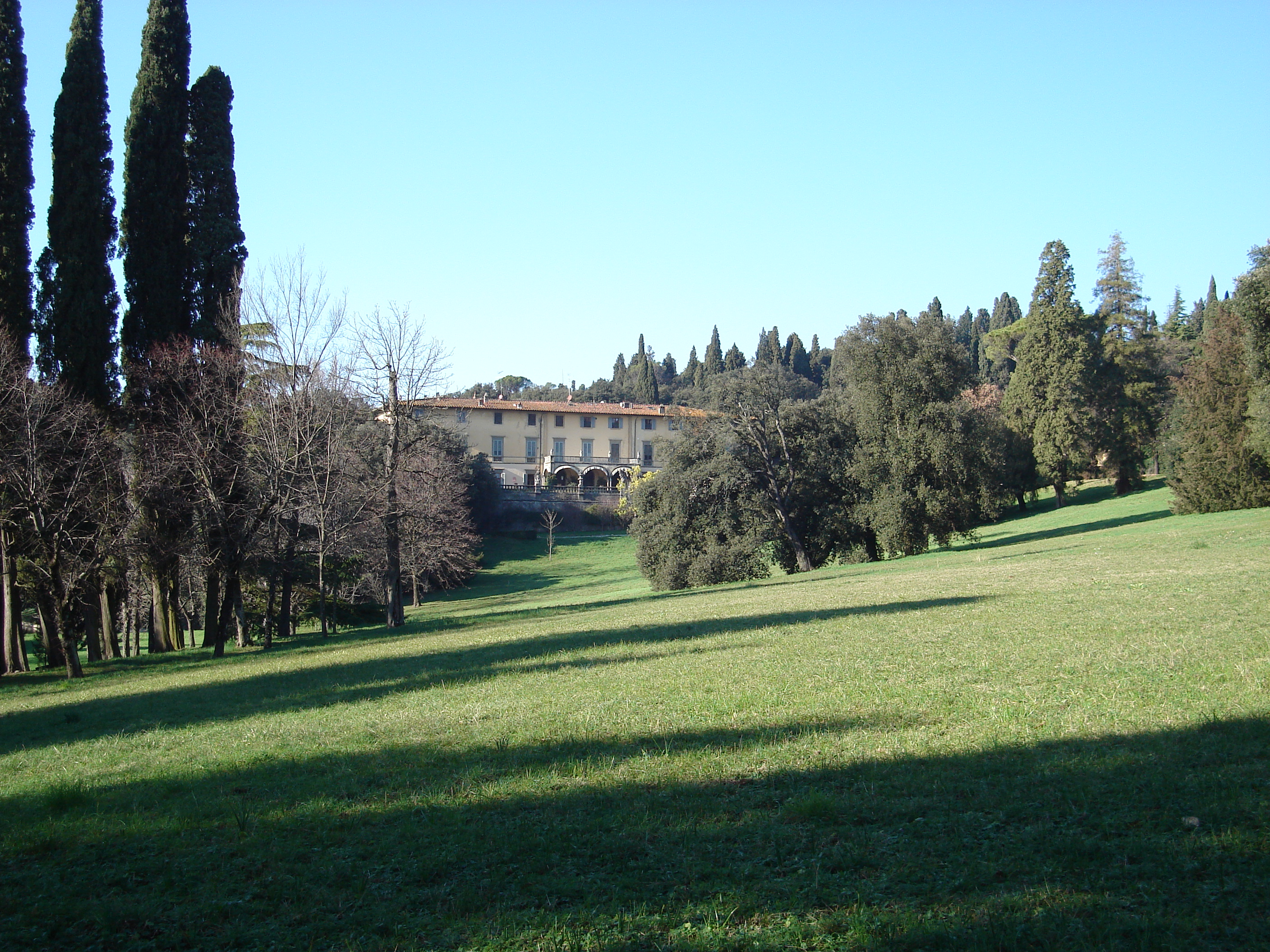
Villa and gardens

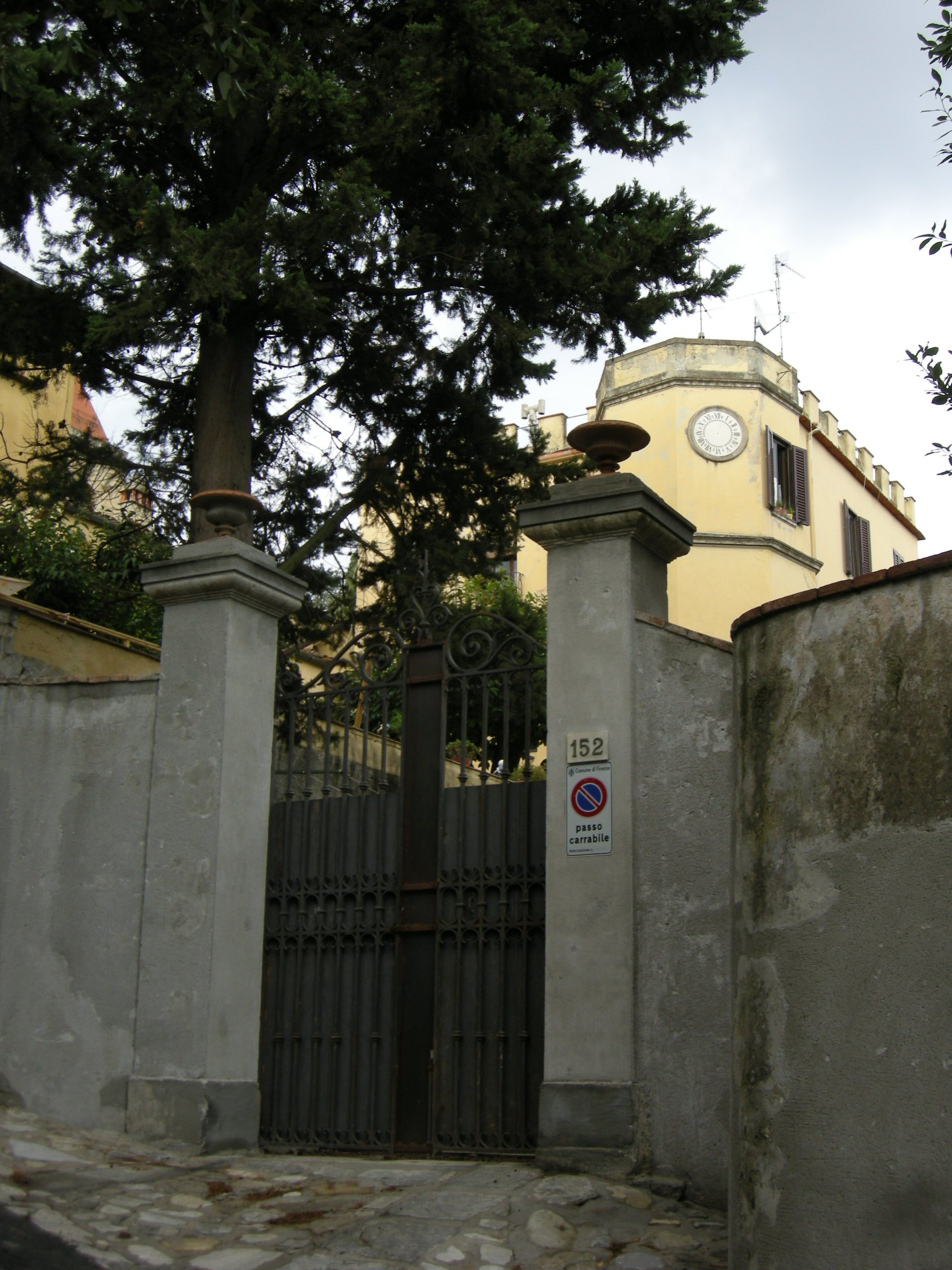
Entrance

The Villa di Quarto is a historic landmark designated villa on via Pietro Dazzi in Florence, in the hilly zone at the foot of the Monte Morello. Quarto (fourth) is one of the toponyms relating to the Roman milestones, the most famous of which in this area is Sesto Fiorentino, with 45,000 inhabitants.

== History ==
The villa was built in the 15th century and, after various changes of ownership, in 1613 it was passed to the Pasquali family, who had it rebuilt by Alfonso Parigi, designer of the Boboli extension. In the 19th century the villa took on its present appearance - it then belonged to Jérôme Bonaparte, former king of Westphalia, who left it to his daughter Princess Mathilde Bonaparte, wife of the Russian nobleman and industrialist Anatoly Nikolaievich Demidov, 1st Prince of San Donato.

In 1862, Grand Duchess Maria Nikolaevna of Russia, Duchess of Leuchtenberg, eldest daughter of Tsar Nicholas I, bought the Villa and filled it in the following years with works of art. Karl Eduard von Liphard was head of the circle of advisers around. Until her death in St. Petersburg in 1876 she bought lavishly. The Villa Quarto was inherited by her daughter Helena Countess Stroganov, from the second morganatic marriage to Belyakova, Zoia, Grand Duchess Maria Nikolaevna and her palace in St. Petersburg, London.

The villa's many famous guests included the French historian and statistician Adolphe Thiers. Among its most famous residents -and certainly the resident who wrote most about his stay there- was the author Mark Twain.

=== Mark Twain's stay ===
Mark Twain (Samuel Langhorne Clemens) lived at the villa with his ill wife and children, prior to her death in 1904. In his autobiography, he describes the villa, in almost all its parts, in a bad and moody way. This includes the interior, the scale of the rooms, the colors and the "countess" - the divorced wife of a New Yorker businessman, "Countess Massiglia" a.k.a. Frances Lloyd Paxton - who lived there alongside the Clemenses.

== Villa ==
The building has a simple layout, with three floors that are 200 feet long by 60 feet wide. On the garden side, there opens up a nineteenth-century loggia with three arches on twin columns, replacing an older eighteenth century arcade. The main entrance is located on the side hill, with large doors that lead to a hall enriched by marble busts and a frescoed vault. From the atrium starts monumental gray stone that leads to the first floor where the main saloon is located, the latter about 8 meters high, with vaulted and frescoed ceilings featuring nineteenth century motifs. This is connected to other rooms as grand and the gallery, running parallel to the terrace above the outside portico, from which is possible to enjoy the view of the large Italian garden and the great lawn of the English park. Currently, the landmark villa has been restored with structural and protective interventions in the outer parts completed in 2019.
