= Lorenzo Bartolini =

Italian sculptor (1777–1850)

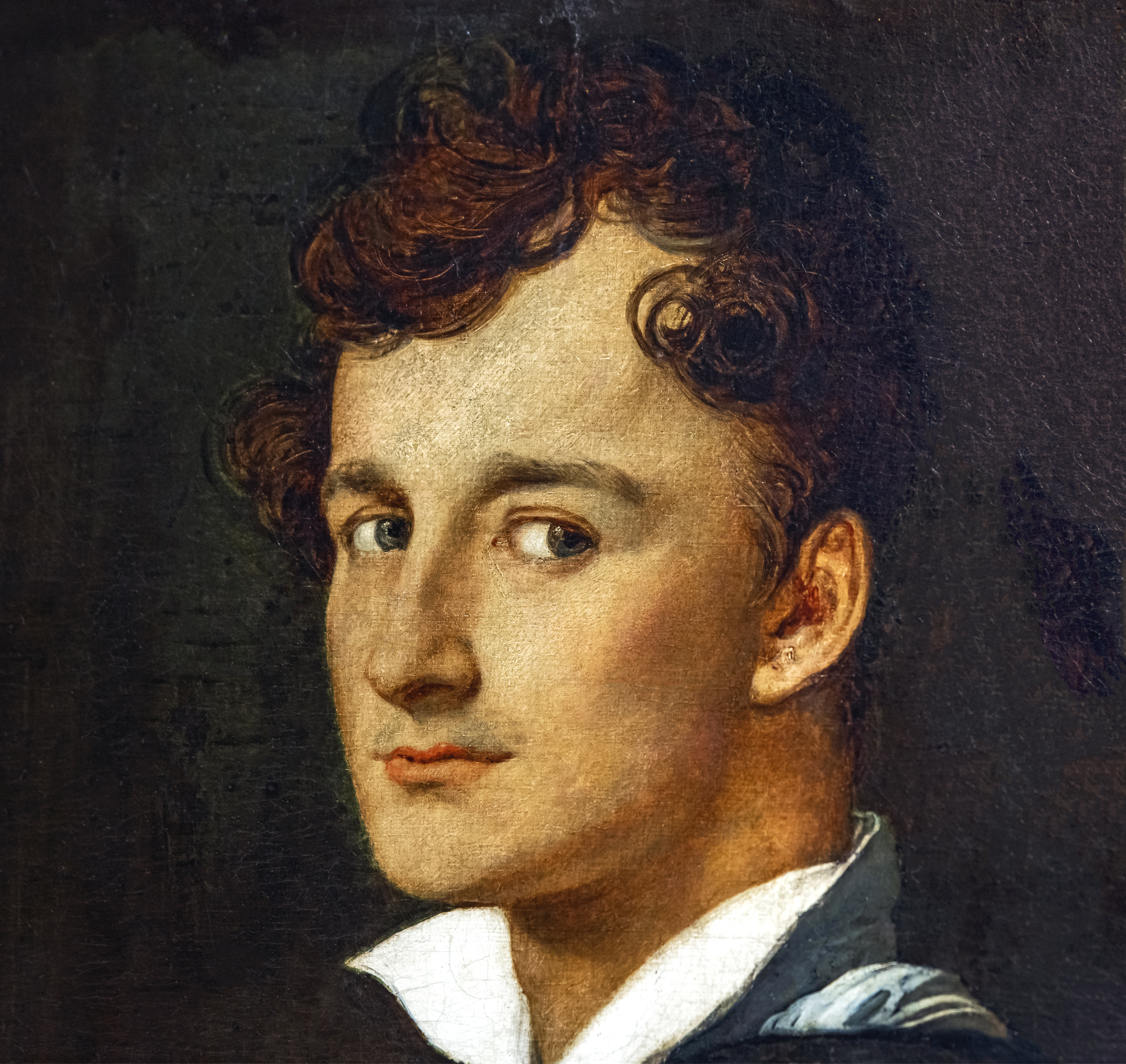
- Portrait by Ingres (detail, 1805)
- Born: 7 January 1777
- Died: 20 January 1850 (aged 73)
- Known for: Sculpture

Lorenzo Bartolini (Prato, 7 January 1777 – Florence, 20 January 1850) was an Italian sculptor who infused his neoclassicism with a strain of sentimental piety and naturalistic detail, while he drew inspiration from the sculpture of the Florentine Renaissance rather than the overpowering influence of Antonio Canova that circumscribed his Florentine contemporaries.

== Biography ==
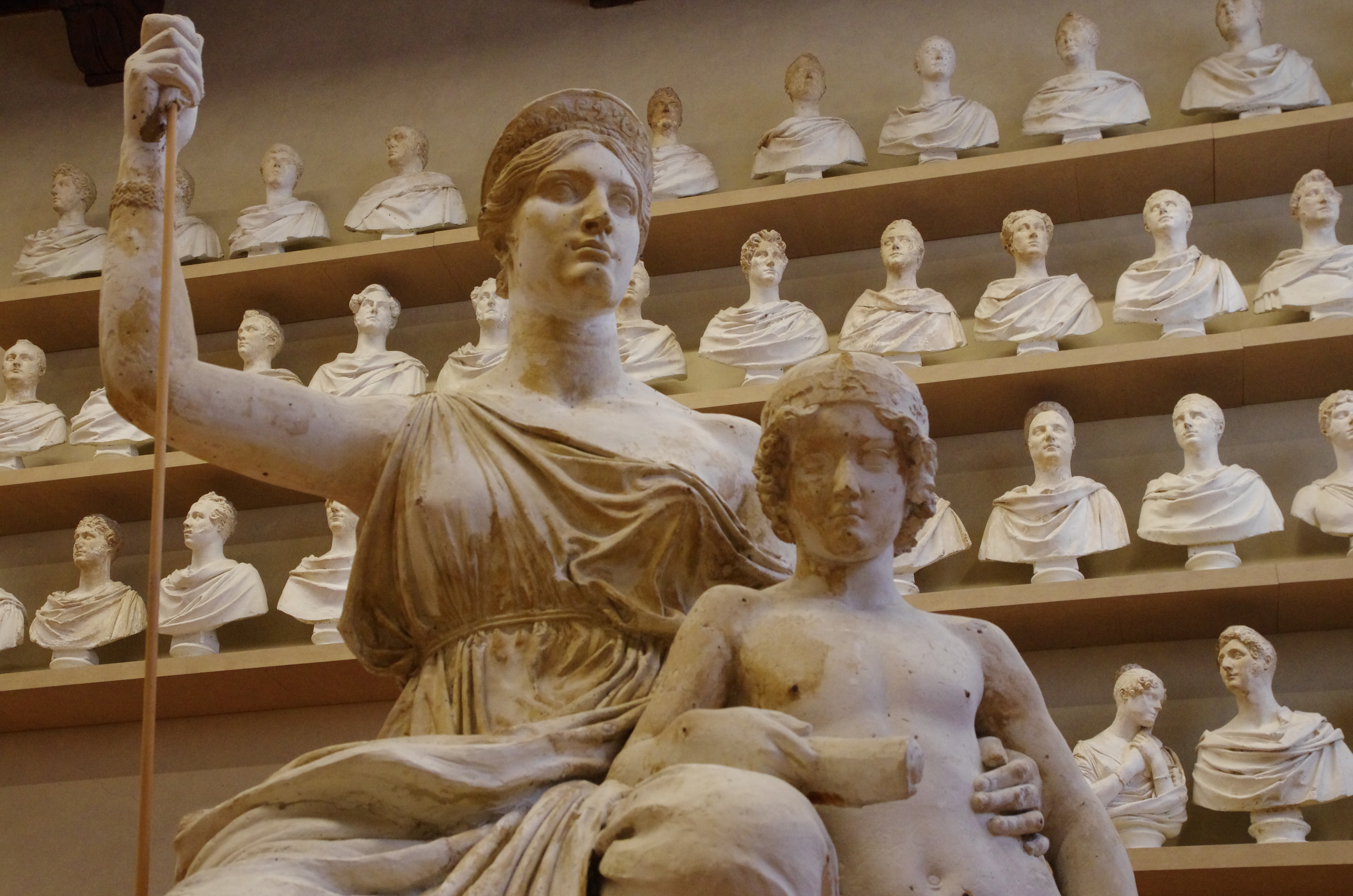
Monument to Elisa Bonaparte Baciocchi, Grand Duchess of Tuscany (the Magnanimity of Elisa)

Bartolini was born in Savignano di Prato, near Prato, Tuscany.

After studying at the Florentine Academy of Fine Arts, honing his skills and reputation as a modeller in alabaster, he went in 1797 to Paris, where he studied painting under Jean-Baptiste Frédéric Desmarais, and afterwards sculpture under François-Frédéric Lemot. The bas-relief Cleobis and Biton, with which he gained the second prize of the Academy in 1803, at once established his fame as a sculptor and gained for him a number of influential patrons. His bas-relief of the Battle of Austerlitz was among those executed for the column erected in Place Vendôme. He also executed many minor pieces for Vivant Denon, besides portrait busts of the opera composers Méhul and Cherubini.

His great patron, however, was Napoleon, for whom he executed a colossal bust, and who sent him, on the recommendations of his sister Elisa Baciocchi, to the Accademia Carrara in Bergamo in 1807, to teach sculpture, in spite of local opposition. Here he remained as the quasi-official portrait sculptor to the Bonapartes until after the fall of Napoleon. In 1833, Bartolini was elected to the National Academy of Design as an Honorary member. He then took up residence in Florence, where he lived until his death.

He is buried in the Church of Santa Croce in north-east Florence.

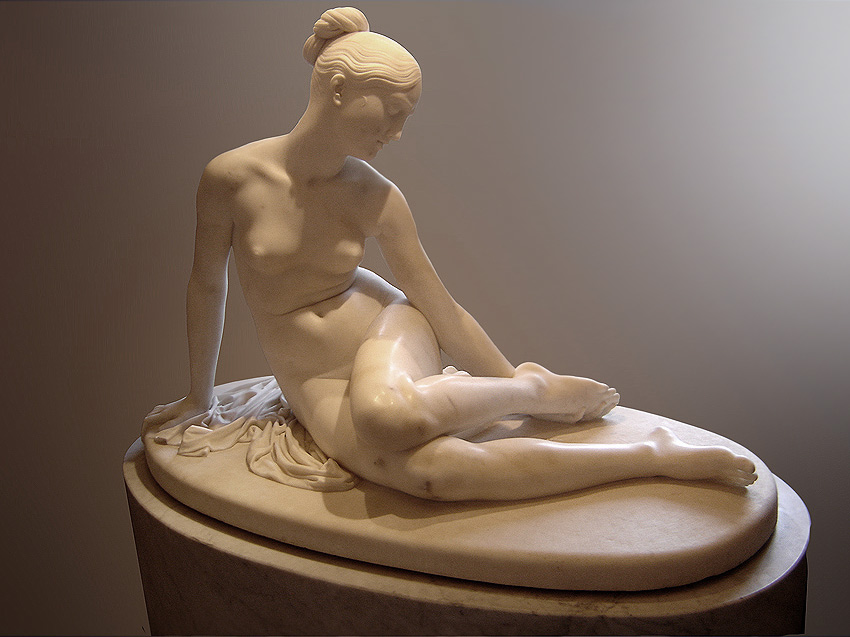
Nymph and the Scorpion, Louvre Museum

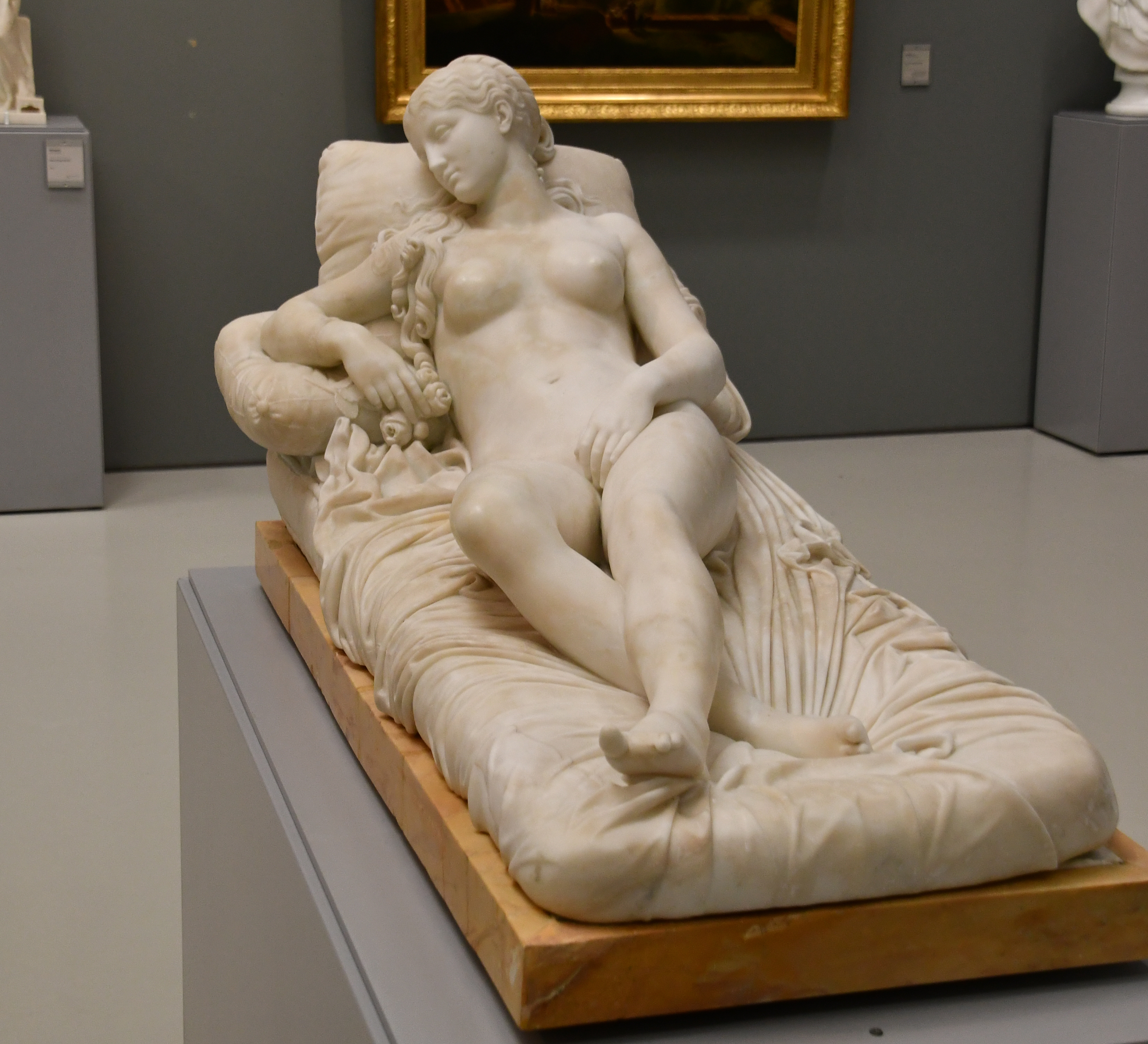
Lying Venus, 1820–1830, Musée Fabre, Montpellier

== Works ==
In Florence, his Bonapartist associations and his departures as an artist from the strict Canovan classicism being taught at the Academy" limited his opportunities. His naturalistic and somewhat sentimental marble L'Ammostatore ("The Bird's-nest Stealer", 1820) took its inspiration from under-appreciated Quattrocento Florentine sculptors like Andrea del Verrocchio. In his decade of impoverishment, supportive commissions came from foreigners; the funeral monument to Princess Zofia Czartoryska in the Santa Croce, Florence's Westminster Abbey, is an anti-classical statement for naturalism. Two other Bartolini monuments in Santa Croce can be compared with it; in the Capella Giugni is his monument to Charlotte Bonaparte, but when the occasion required a more formal approach, as in the monument to Leone Battista Alberti, the result could be chilly.

A major commission came in 1830 from the sons of the Russian emigree prince Nicola Demidoff, who had retired to Florence. The sons commissioned the Monument to Nicola Demidoff to honor their father, which was placed in Piazza Demidoff, Florence. The commission's multiple figures took shape during Bartolini's last decades; it was completed by Bartolini's assistant Pasquale Romanelli.

His works are varied and include an immense number of portrait busts. The best are, perhaps, the group of Charity (1824), the Hercules and Lichas and Faith in God, commissioned by the widow of Giuseppe Poldi Pezzoli (1768-1833), a wealthy landowner. His portrait statue of Machiavelli took its place as his only commission among the long series of historical Florentine males provided for the empty exterior niches of the Uffizi. He sculpted the Monument to Maria Luisa di Borbone depicting the former Duchess and located in the piazza in front of the Ducal Palace of Lucca.

== Honours ==
- 1847: Member of the Royal Academy of Science, Letters and Fine Arts of Belgium
