= Salvatore Tonci =

Italian painter (1756–1844)

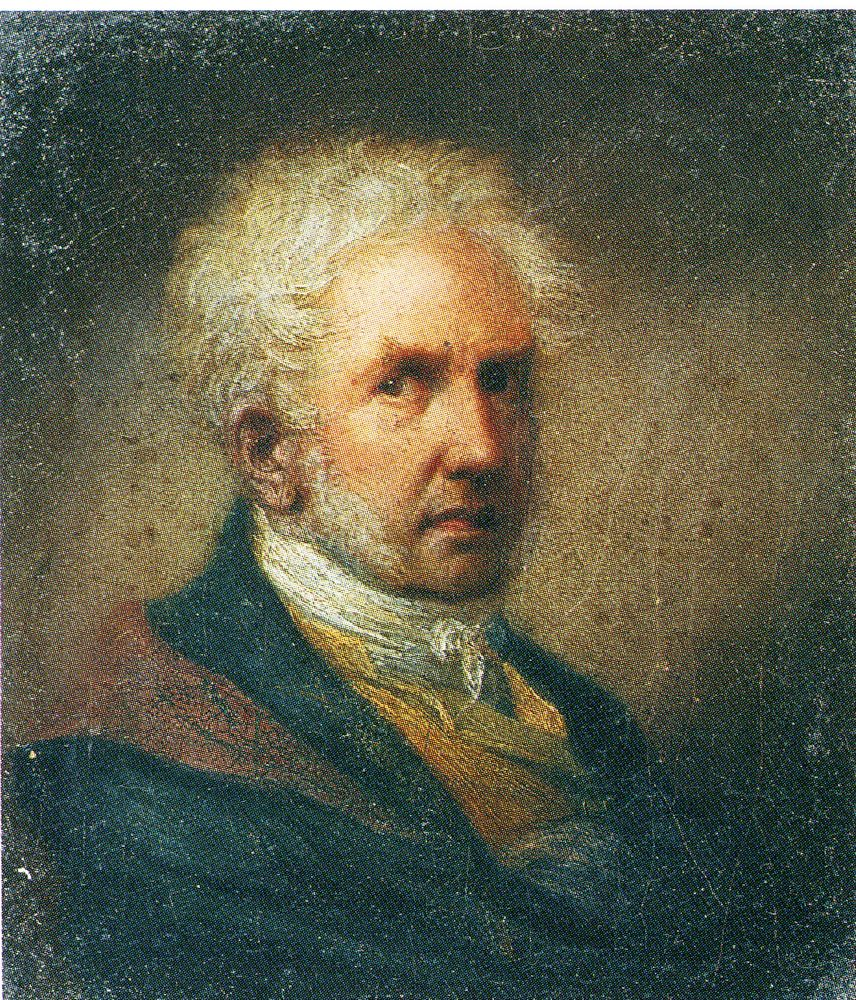
Self-portrait (1812)

Salvatore Tonci (Russian: Сальваторе Тончи; January 1756, Rome – December 1844, Moscow) was an Italian-born painter, musician, singer and amateur poet who spent most of his career in Russia. He generally called himself "Nikolai Ivanovich", in preference to "Salvatore Sigismondovich".

== Biography ==
His father was a doctor from Siena. In his youth, he was a member of the Royal Guard of the Kingdom of Naples. During this time, he also studied singing and painting. In 1793, he spent some time at the Accademia di Belle Arti di Bologna.

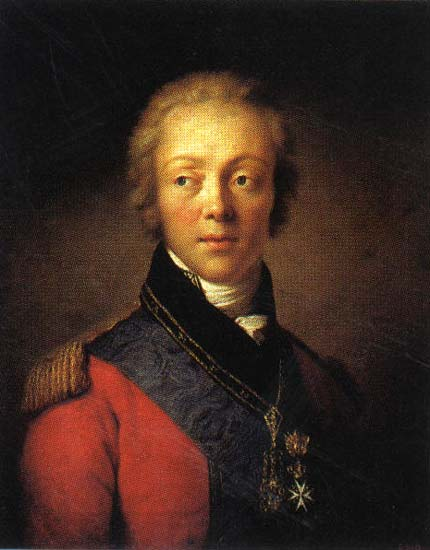
Fyodor Rostopchin

Soon after, he left Italy and went to Poland to become a singer in the court of King Stanislaw II. This position did not last long, however, as the Third Partition forced the King to abdicate in 1795. Tonci followed him into exile in Saint Petersburg but, as the King was virtually a prisoner in the Marble Palace, Tonci had to find other means of support.

After 1800, he worked in Moscow, where he established himself as a portrait painter. In 1805, by that means, he met and married Princess Natalia Gagarina (1778–1832), the daughter of Prince Ivan Sergyevich Gagarin. Although the marriage was considered a misalliance by her family, it served as his introduction into high society, where he became a good friend of Count Fyodor Rostopchin. The union produced two daughters; Sofia, who died at the age of nine, and Maria, who lived in a monastery until her death in 1898 at the age of eighty-six.

In September 1812, he witnessed the brutal and bloody mob murder of Mikhail Vereshchagin, a writer who had been denounced as a traitor by Count Rostopchin. Only a few days later, most of Moscow was destroyed by fire. He fled to Vladimir but became lost on the way and, because of his foreign accent, was arrested as a spy. Although the misunderstanding was cleared up, he was in a disturbed state of mind and attempted to cut his throat with a razor. He missed his jugular vein and survived. As a way of giving thanks for his recovery, he created a large painting of the "Baptism of Vladimir the Great" for Dormition Cathedral. He lived there for two years and returned to Moscow in 1814.

After 1815, he worked for the "Экспедиция кремлёвского строения" (roughly: Dispatch Office for Kremlin Buildings), an agency that was responsible for construction and repairs at the Imperial palaces in Moscow. For twenty-five years, he was Supervisor of the drawing classes at the Moscow School of Painting, Sculpture and Architecture. In 1831, he began preparing his poems and other written works for publication, but they remain in manuscript. Due to ill health, in 1842 he retired from all of his positions, with the rank of Collegiate Counselor, and died two years later.

== Selected portraits ==
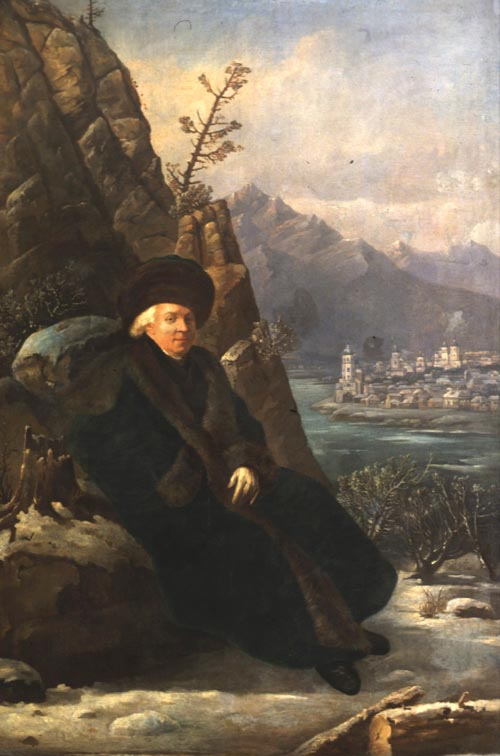
Gavrila Derzhavin

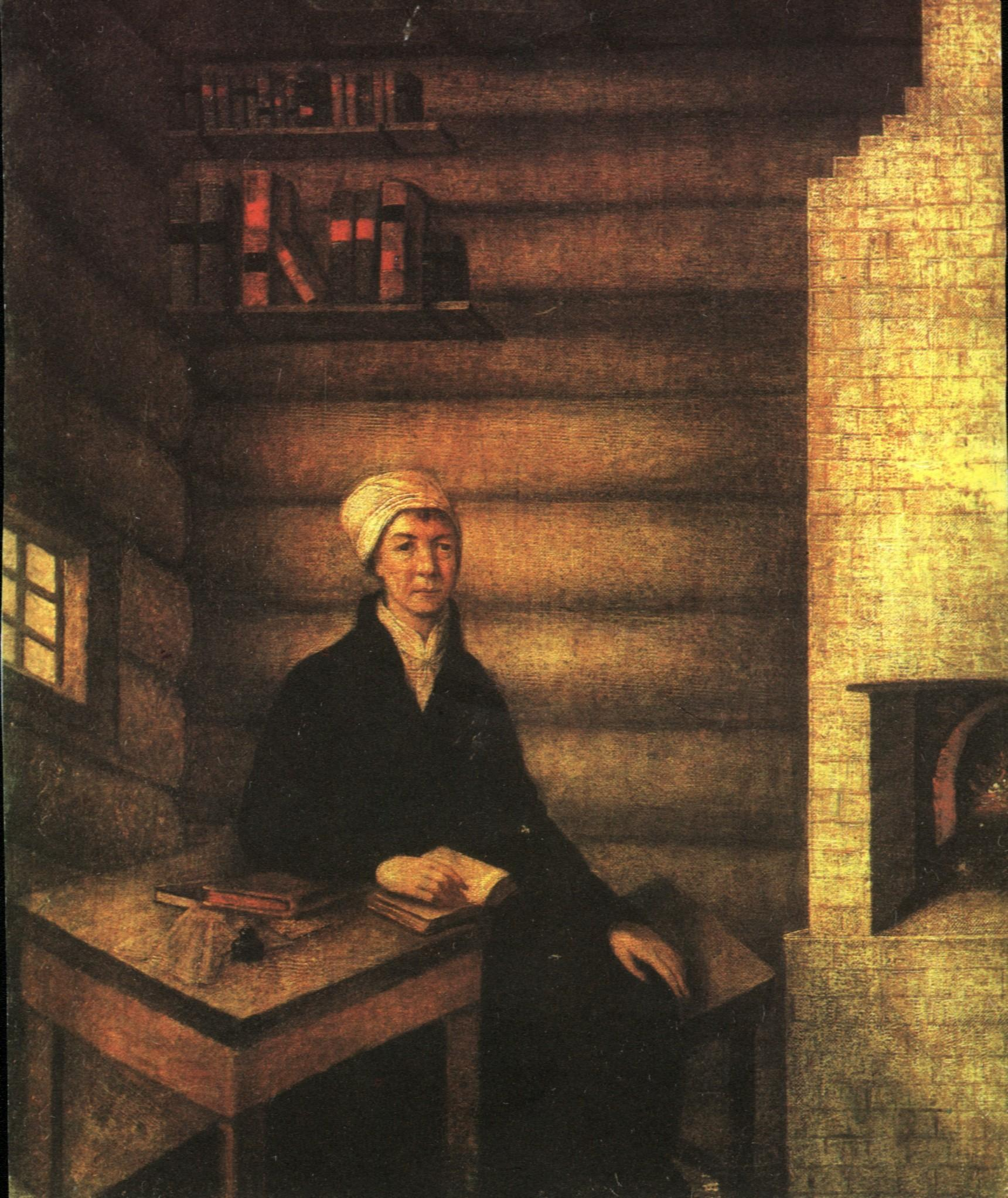
Yekaterina Vorontsova-Dashkova in Exile

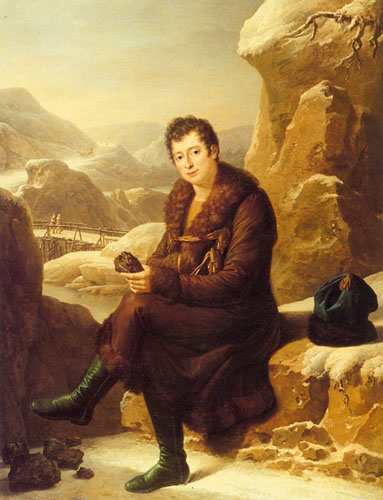
Nikolai Nikitich Demidov

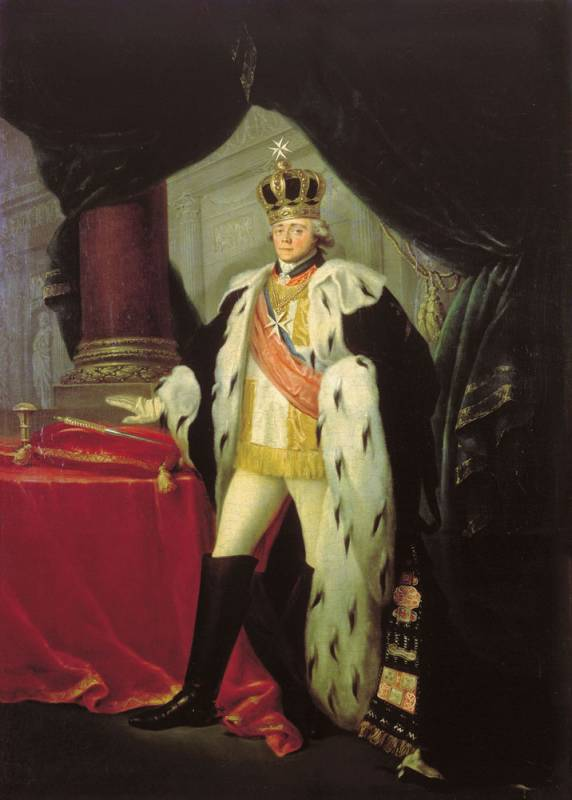
Paul I as Grand Master of the Order of Malta
