= Elizaveta Alexandrovna Stroganova =

Russian aristocrat (1779–1818)

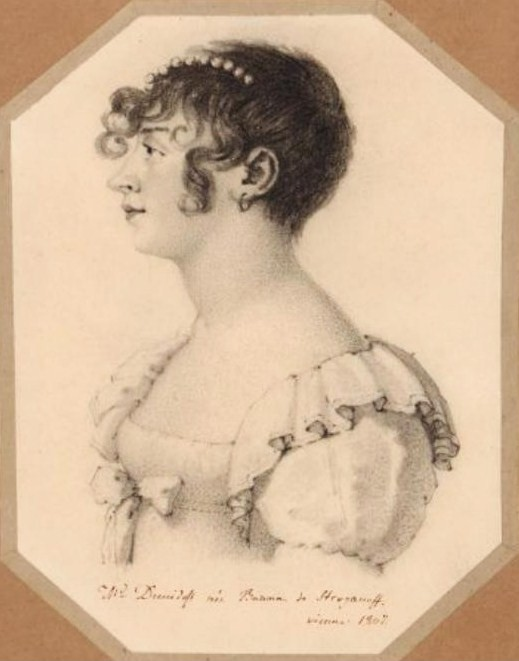
Elizaveta Alexandrovna Demidova née Stroganova. Unknown artist, 1807.

Portrait by Robert Lefèvre (c. 1800–1805), Saint Petersburg, Hermitage.

Baroness Elizaveta Alexandrovna Demidova (née Stroganova; 3/5 February 1779, Saint Petersburg, Russian Empire – 8 April 1818, Paris; Russian: Елизавета Александровна Строганова) was a Russian aristocrat of the Stroganov family. She was the hostess of an aristocratic salon and the wife of industrialist Nikolai Nikitich Demidov. Known for her gallomania, spent most of her life in Paris.

== Life ==
The youngest daughter of the actual privy councilor, Baron Alexander Nikolaevich Stroganov (1740–1789) from his marriage to Elizaveta Alexandrovna (1745–1831), daughter of Chief General A. A. Zagryazhsky. By birth she belonged to the highest nobility of the capital. Elizabeth's father was the owner of the Taman and Kynovsky factories and more than half a million acres of land. Her mother Elizaveta Alexandrovna Zagryazhskaya was a lady in waiting and a famous beauty of Catherine II's court.

Born in St. Petersburg, baptized on 2 December 1776 in St. Sergius Cathedral under the adoption of sister Catherine and brother Gregory. Elizabeth's uncle, Count Alexander Sergeevich Stroganov, not only owned the Bilimbaevsky mountain district in the Urals, but was also a major statesman close to Catherine II and Paul I. Elizaveta was also the cousin of N. I. Goncharova (mother-in-law of Alexander Pushkin).

In September 1795 in Saint Petersburg, she married Count Nikolai Nikitich Demidov at the age of 17. Husband Nikolai Demidov became a diplomat in 1800 and the young couple set up home in Paris, in the Hôtel de Brancas-Lauragais, at the corner of Rue Taitbout and Boulevard des Italiens, becoming strong supporters of Napoleon I of France.

However, mounting tensions between France and Russia forced Russia to call Nicolas back home in 1805. The couple then set up home in Italy before returning to Russia in 1812 to settle in Moscow.

They were of completely different characters and often lived apart. She was beautiful, light and witty, and her husband more introspective, and so they soon grew bored with each other. After Anatole's birth in 1812, they separated and she returned to live in Paris without her husband; he and his children lived in Rome, and then in Florence.

She died at the age of 41, after a short illness, having converted, as her contemporaries persistently said, to Catholicism. She is buried in the Père Lachaise Cemetery. Later, by order of her son Anatoly Demidov, the architect Zhoret and the sculptor Quaglia created a majestic mausoleum with white marble columns.

== Children ==
They had two children, who lived to adult age:

- Pavel (Paul) Nikolaievich Demidov (1798–1840)
- Anatoly (Anatole) Nikolaievich Demidov (1812–1869)

Two other died as young children:

- Aleksandra Nikolaievna Demidova (19 October 1796 – 24 August 1800)
- Nikolai Nikolaievich Demidov (17 February 1799 – 24 August 1800)

== Legend ==
According to legend, she was buried in a glass coffin, and her legacy could be given to the person who spent 365 nights in the mausoleum (Père Lachaise Cemetery in Paris ). Several people tried this, but it was so scary that no one could stand it (or went crazy). The story emerged much later after the countess's death, and is presumably a fabrication.
