= Monument to Maria Luisa di Borbone, Lucca =

Coordinates: 43.84140°N 10.50250°E

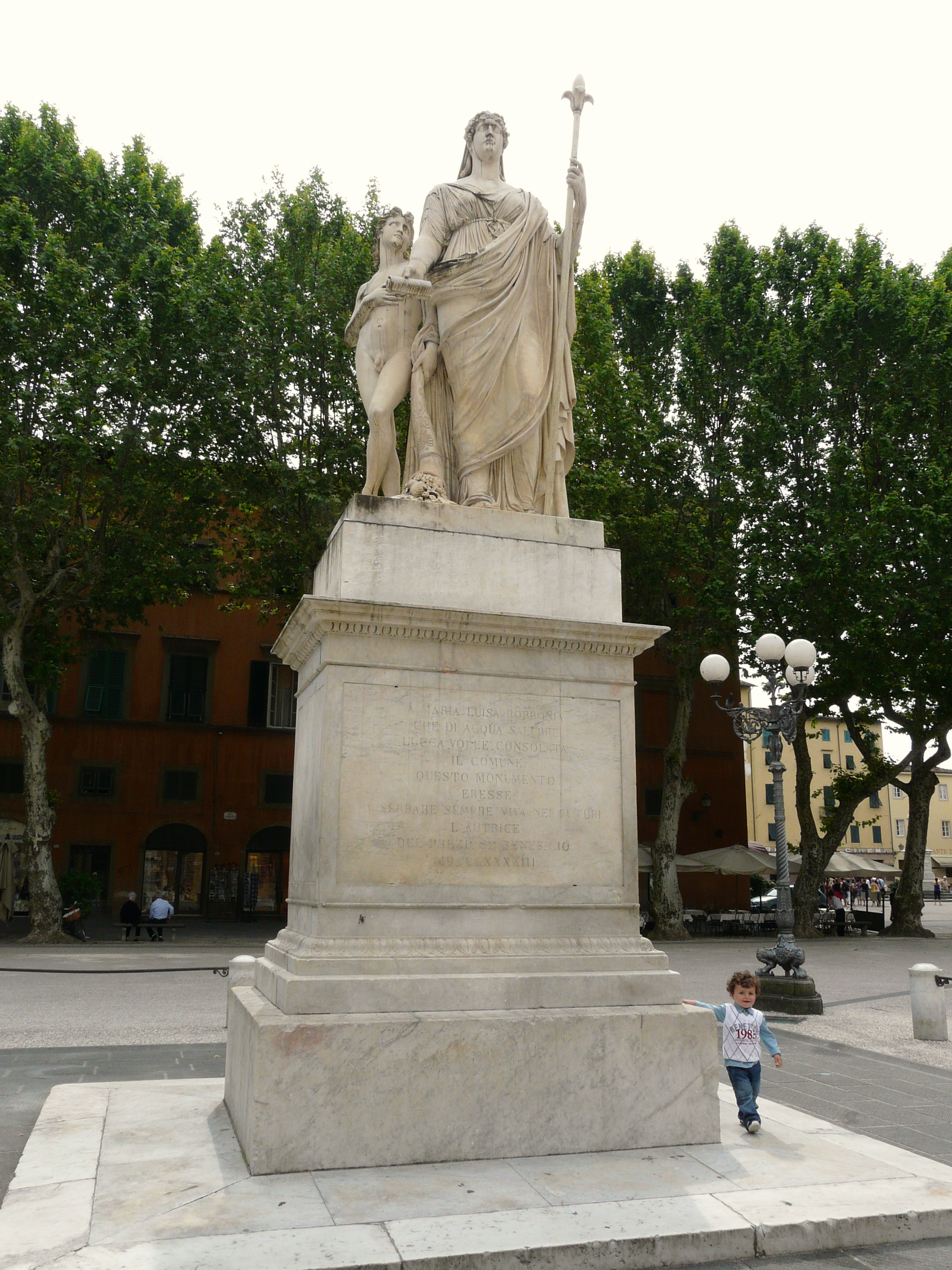
Monument to Maria Luisa di Borbone

The Monument to Maria Luisa di Borbone is a marble statuary group depicting the former Duchess of Lucca, sculpted by Lorenzo Bartolini, and located in the center of the piazza in front of the Ducal Palace of Lucca, in the region of Tuscany, Italy.

After the death of Maria Luisa in 1824, the commune voted for the creation of a statue in her honor, and contracted for a design by Lorenzo Bartolini. The sculpture is in the center of the large rectangular Piazza Grande, or Piazza Napoleone, in front of the palace had been cleared in 1806 by the Napoleonic government, in the process razing houses, warehouses, and the church of San Pietro Maggiore. Initially a statue honoring Napoleon had been planned for this spot, but Maria Luisa, who held a personal antipathy to the former French emperor and his family (Napoleon's sister Elisa Bonaparte had ruled Lucca as Princess of Lucca and Piombino until 1814), squelched that idea in favor of a monument to Charles II, Duke of Parma. That monument was putatively moved to the ramparts of the town. In 1823, the year before the death of Maria Luisa, it was decided to dedicate a statue in her honor in gratitude for her patronage of the city aqueduct. The monument was designed by the Neoclassical Tuscan sculptor Bartolini.

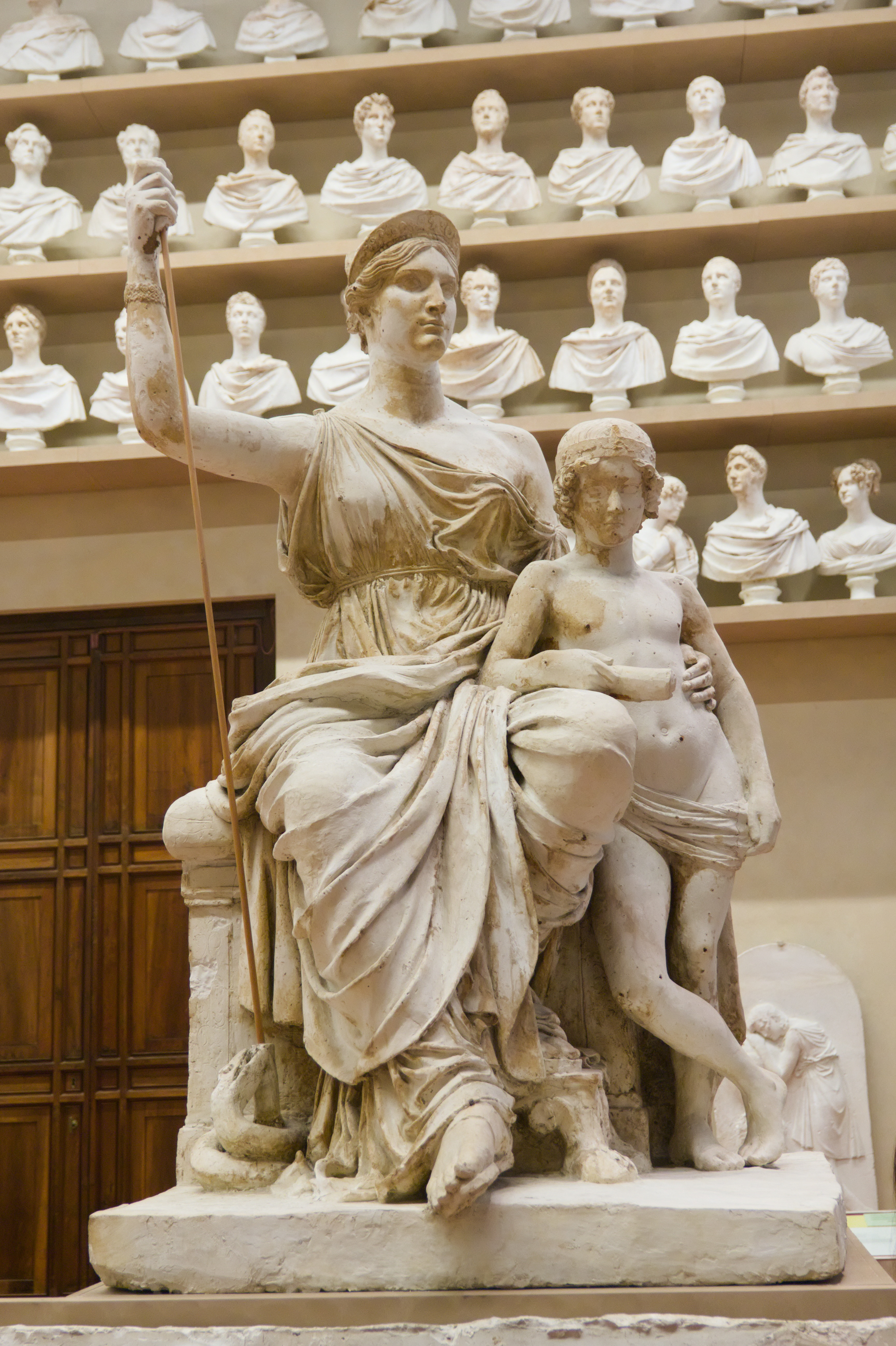
Bartolini's Monument to Elisa Bonaparte Baciocchi

The awkward statue depicts the somewhat rotund Duchess with naked boy at her side. He holds a cornucopia, she holds a roll of paper and a peculiar staff. The arrangement, also somewhat awkwardly, does have some similarities (woman with staff beside a young boy) with Bartolini's earlier Monument to Elisa Bonaparte Baciocchi.
