= Nikolai Nikitich Demidov =

Russian businessman and arts patron

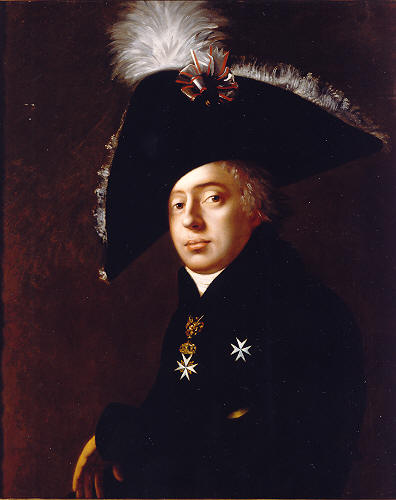
Nikolay Nikitich Demidov (1798-1840). Collection Alexandre Tissot Demidoff.

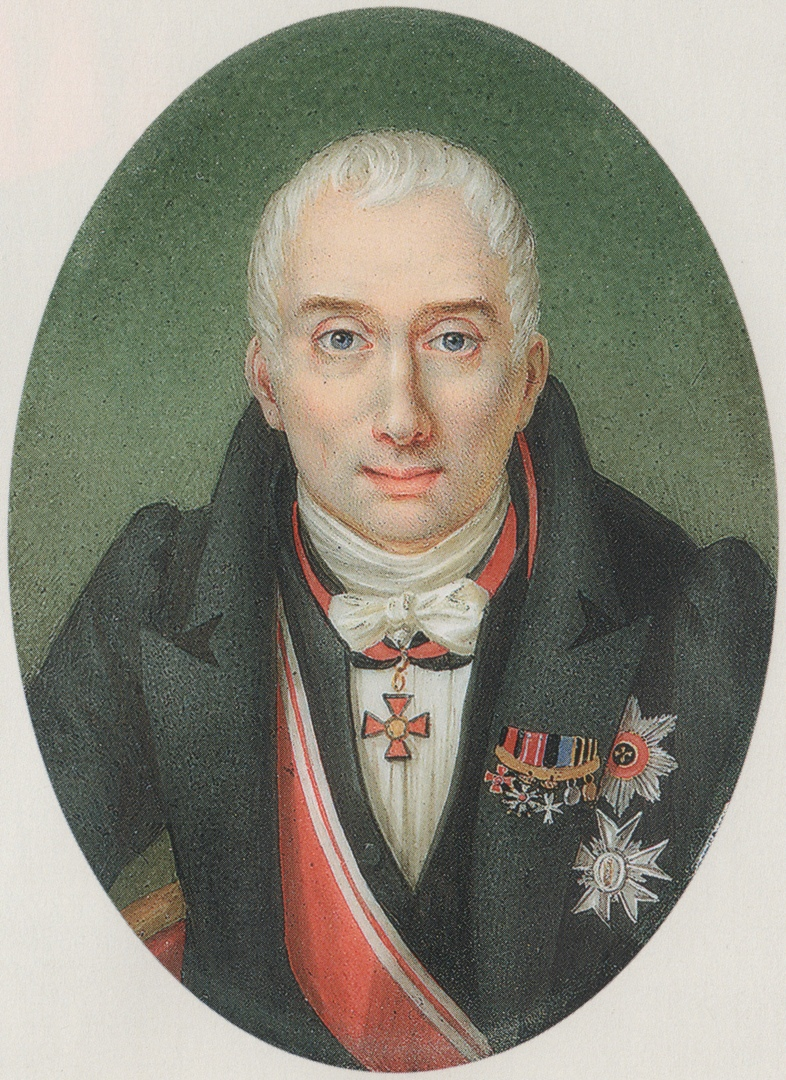
Nikolaiy Nikitich Demidov. Portrait on ceramic by an unknown artist, 1820´s. Kramskoy Historical and Art Museum, Ostrogozhsky.

Nikolai Nikitich Demidov (9 October / November 1773 Chirkovitsi village near Saint Petersburg – 22 April 1828) was a Russian industrialist, privy councillor, diplomat, lieutenant colonel, collector, and arts patron of the Demidov family.

== Life ==
The son of Nikita Akinfiyevich Demidov (1724–1786) and his third wife Alexandra Evtikhievna Safonova (1745-1778), Nikolai Demidov inherited his father's industrial empire aged only 15 and began to spend so recklessly that the government had to send in the receivers. He inherited the iron and coppersmelting plants of Nizhny Tagil, Nizhny Saldinsky, Verkhne-Saldinsky, Tšerno Istochensky, Visimo Utkinsky, Visimo Shaitansky, Laisky and Vyisky and with them also 11,550 serfs (souls).

== Career ==
Nikolai entered the diplomatic service and the young couple moved to Paris, becoming ardent supporters of Napoleon I of France and setting up home in the Hôtel de Brancas-Lauragais, at the corner of Rue Taitbout and Boulevard des Italiens.

However, rising Franco-Russian tensions forced his recall and they moved back to Russia via Italy, arriving in Russia in 1812. He fought with distinction in the Russo-Turkish War (1806–1812) and at the start of the French invasion of Russia he financed the creation of an infantry regiment, including his son Pavel as one of its officers, which he then commanded against Napoleon's forces, fighting at Oravais and Borodino.

== Patron of Sciences and Arts ==
Returning to Russia in 1806, Demidov, wanting to introduce all the latest improvements in terms of technology at his factories, ordered Professor Ferry, then a famous expert in mining, from France, and put him 15,000 rubles a salary a year, a very significant amount for that time. Wishing to train experienced craftsmen for his factories, Demidov, at his own expense, sent more than a hundred serfs abroad to England, Sweden and Austria to study special branches of mining.

In 1813 he gave his important collections to the mineralogical museum of Moscow founded by his uncle Pavel Grigoryevich to replace those lost in the fire of the city, giving art collections to Moscow University in the same vein.

He also financed the construction of four cast iron bridges in Saint Petersburg. With age, he also became a wiser industrialist, modernising his factories' infrastructure and doubling his fortune. He gave his home over to many industries and public utility services, perfecting the exploitation of mines and raising his income to 5 million. At the Nizhny Tagil plant he founded a school in which, in addition to general education subjects, they also taught "the general principles of mechanics and practical mining art." This school, which gave the best craftsmen for the factories of Demidov and others, was transformed into a district school in 1839 and subordinated to the department of the Ministry of Public Education.

He also acclimatised Bordeaux and Champagne vines and Lucca olive trees to the Crimea, imported horses from England, Merino sheep from Switzerland, ordered Kholmogory cattle, Orenburg goats and Caucasian mountain horses, in addition, he made experiments in the cultivation of cotton and saffron.

Nikolai Demidov served as chamberlain to the Emperor, a Hereditary Commander of the Order of Saint John of Jerusalem, and member of the privy council.

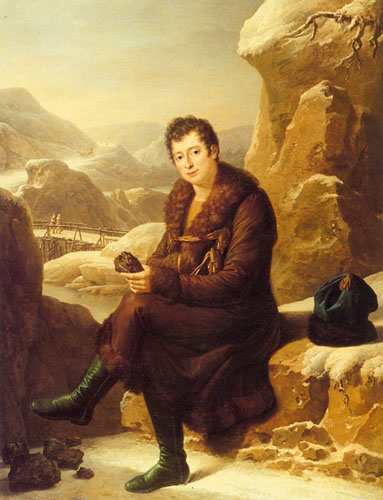
Nicolas Demidoff (1773-1828), by Salvatore Tonci (1756–1844). Russian Museum.

In 1819 he was made Russian ambassador to the court of Tuscany. After divorcing his wife, who moved back to France, he lived his last years in France and Italy among scholars, financing the creation of schools, hospitals and other charitable institutions in Tuscany. He bought 42 acres (170,000 m^{2}) of marshland north of Florence from the Catholic Church and there built the Villa San Donato from 1827 to 1831, where he set up richly decorated private rooms, a suite of 14 rooms housing his enormous art collection, a theatre and a foreign languages academy.

That collection, reputed among the most lavish private collections in Europe, was divided between his residences in San Donato, Saint Petersburg, Paris and Moscow, included works by Flemish and Italian masters, decorative art objects and a famous collection of weapons now in the Wallace Collection in London. His collection of ancient Greek and Roman sculptures is now at the Hermitage Museum. By decree of Leopold II, Grand Duke of Tuscany, on 23 February 1827 Demidov was made "Count of San Donato" for the services he had rendered to Tuscany by setting up a silk factory.

He had built a home for the elderly and orphans and donated a special capital for its maintenance. The grateful citizens of Florence in honour of the donor named one of the squares, near the Demidov Charity House, Demidovskaya and placed on this square a statue of Nikolai Nikitich. A public Monument to Nicola Demidoff designed by Lorenzo Bartolini is located on "Piazza Demidoff" overlooking the river Arno in Oltrarno.

== Titles and awards ==
- Chamberlain, Russia, 1794
- Ober-Chamberlain, Russia, 1796
- Privy Councillor, Russia 1800
- Honorary Member, University of Moscow, 1813

== Family ==
In September 1795 in Saint Petersburg he married Baroness Yelizaveta Alexandrovna Stroganova (Saint Petersburg, 5 February 1779 – Paris, 27 March 1818). By marrying her, Demidov further increased his already enormous wealth.

They had four children:

- Aleksandra Nikolaievna Demidova (19 October 1796 – 24 August 1800), died as a child
- Pavel Nikolaievich Demidov (1798–1840)
- Nikolai Nikolaievich Demidov (17 February 1799 – 24 August 1800), died as a child
- Anatoly Nikolaievich Demidov, 1st Prince of San Donato (1812/1813–1870).

He also had one illegitimate daughter Natalie Wodimov (19 February 1819 - 6 April 1876 Stuttgart, Baden-Württemberg).

Elisabeta Alexandrovna Stroganova. Portrait by Robert Lefèvre (c. 1800–1805), Saint-Petersburg, Hermitage
