= Anatoly Demidov, 1st Prince of San Donato =

Russian botanist and diplomat and art collector (1812–1870)

Anatoly Demidov
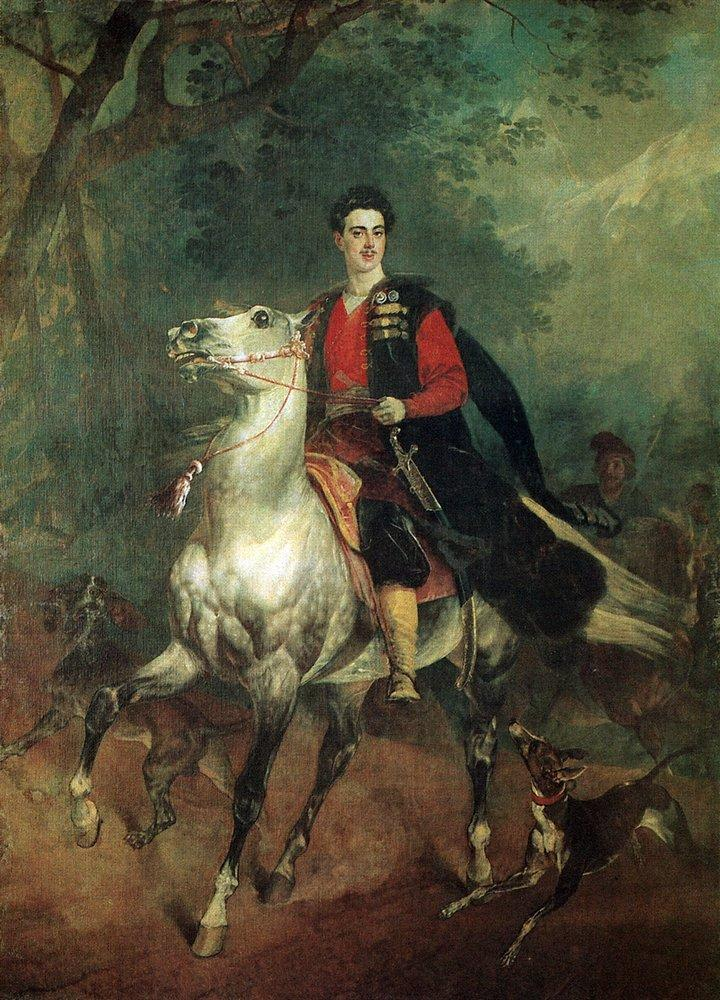
- Anatoly Demidov, by Karl Brullov, 1831

Prince of San Donato
- Reign: 1840-1870
- Predecessor: Creation
- Successor: Pavel Demidov
- Born: 24 March 1813; Saint Petersburg, Russian Empire
- Died: 29 April 1870 (aged 57); Paris, France
- Spouse: Mathilde Bonaparte (m. 1840; sep. 1843)
- House: Demidov
- Father: Nikolai Nikitich Demidov
- Mother: Baroness Elisabeta Alexandrovna Stroganova

Anatoly Nikolaievich Demidov, 1st Prince of San Donato (Russian: Анатолий Николаевич Демидов; 5 April OS: 24 March 1813 – 29 April 1870) was a Russian industrialist, diplomat, active state councillor, and arts patron of the Demidov family.

== Early life ==
Born in Saint Petersburg or Moscow, he was the second surviving son of Count Nikolai Nikitich Demidov and Baroness Elisabeta Alexandrovna Stroganova. He grew up in Paris, where his father was ambassador.

His paternal grandparents were Nikita Akinfiyevich Demidov and, his third wife, Alexandra Evtikhievna Safonova. His maternal grandparents were Baron Alexander Nikolaevich Stroganov and Elizaveta Alexandrovna (a daughter of Chief General A. A. Zagryazhsky).

== Career ==
He served briefly as a diplomat himself in Paris living in the hôtel built by Charles de Wailly for the sculptor Augustin Pajou, at 87 rue de la Pépinière, now the rue La Boétie, Rome and Venice.

Upon his father's death in 1828, Anatole settled for good in Western Europe, returning to Russia as little as possible. This attitude alienated him from tsar Nicholas I of Russia, who always had an antipathy towards him.

=== Scholarly endeavours ===
In 1837–38, he organised a scientific expedition of 22 scholars, writers and artists, of which Auguste Raffet and the critic Jules Janin became Demidov's friends, to southern Russia and the Crimea, headed up by Frédéric Le Play. It cost 500,000 francs and its results were published as Voyage dans la Russie méridionale et la Crimée (4 vol., 1840–1842), with 100 original lithographs by Raffet and dedicated to the tsar despite his not having taken any interest in the book, irritated by that most of the expedition's members had been French.

Demidov also financed a trip to Russia by André Durand in order to identify landscapes, which were published under the title Voyage pittoresque et archéologique en Russie in 1839. In 1840, Demidov himself published a series of articles on Russia in the Journal des Débats – these were collected as Lettres sur l’Empire de Russie in 1840 with the aim of fighting certain received French ideas about Russia. Nevertheless, these works irritated Nicholas I due to their description of Russia's feudal system. In 1847 Demidov made a trip to Spain with Raffet, publishing an account of it later as Etapes maritimes sur les côtes d’Espagne in 1858. In 1842, he was elected a foreign member of the Royal Swedish Academy of Sciences.

=== Art collector ===
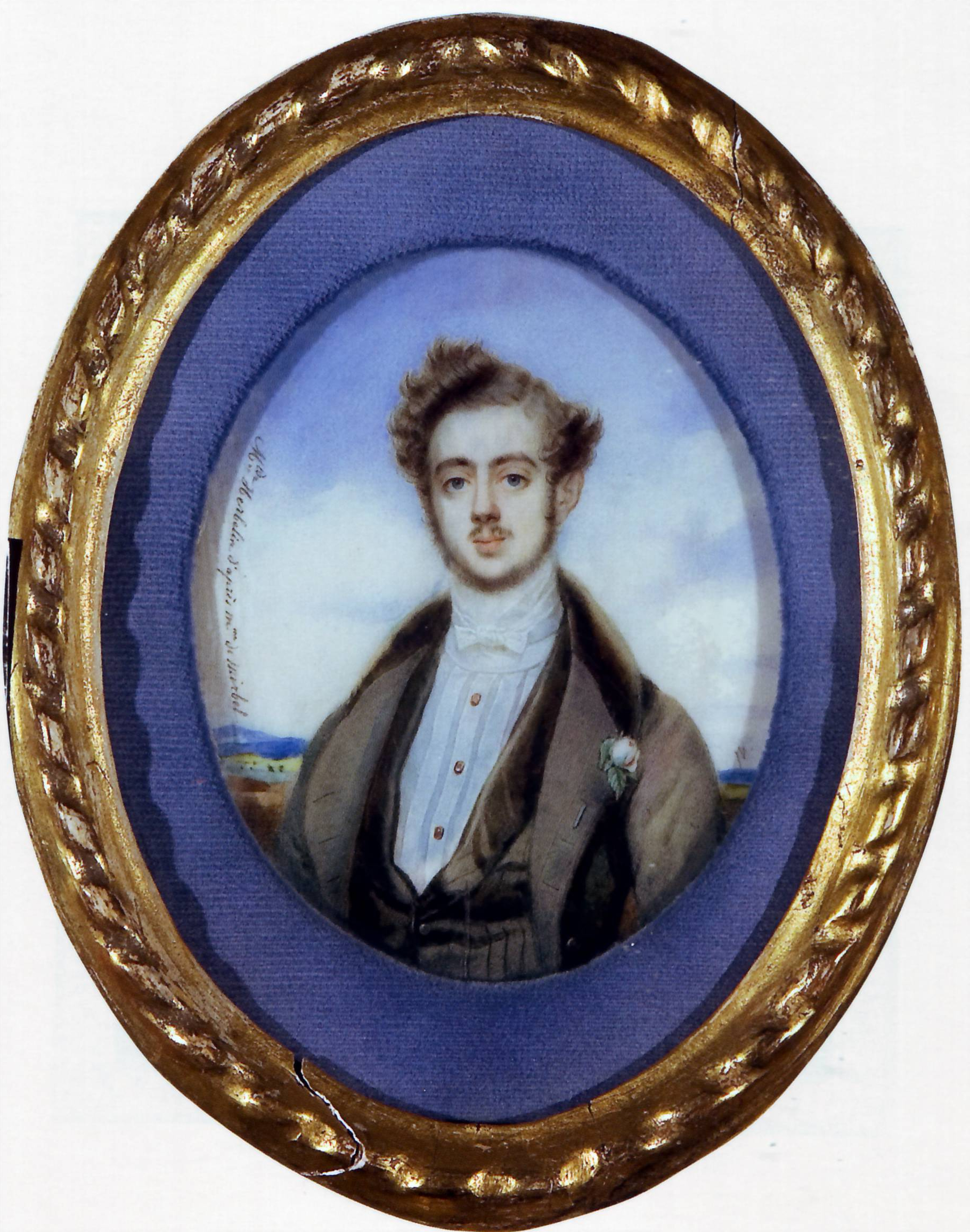
Anatol Demidov

He also considerably expanded the Demidov collection assembled by his father at the Villa San Donato near Florence, being particularly interested in Romantic art. In the Paris Salon of 1834 he acquired Paul Delaroche's The Execution of Lady Jane Grey, at the present in the National Gallery, London. In 1833, he bought François Marius Granet's The Death of Poussin, which caused a sensation at the 1834 Salon.

He commissioned paintings from Eugène Delacroix and watercolours from Richard Parkes Bonington and Théodore Géricault, as well as Briullov's The Last Day of Pompeii. His collection was split up in public sales in Paris in 1863 and shortly before the prince's death in 1870.

The family owned copper and malachite mines in the Urals and Demidov was known as "the king of Malachite". In 1835 he presented Tsar Nicholas I with the amazing malachite Rotunda which is now on display in the Fore Hall before the Nicholas Hall of the Hermitage in St Petersburg. Later he donated 15 tons of malachite for columns in St Isaac's Cathedral, and his mines supplied the material for the Malachite Room in the Winter Palace, constructed after the fire of 1837.

=== Marriage and separation ===
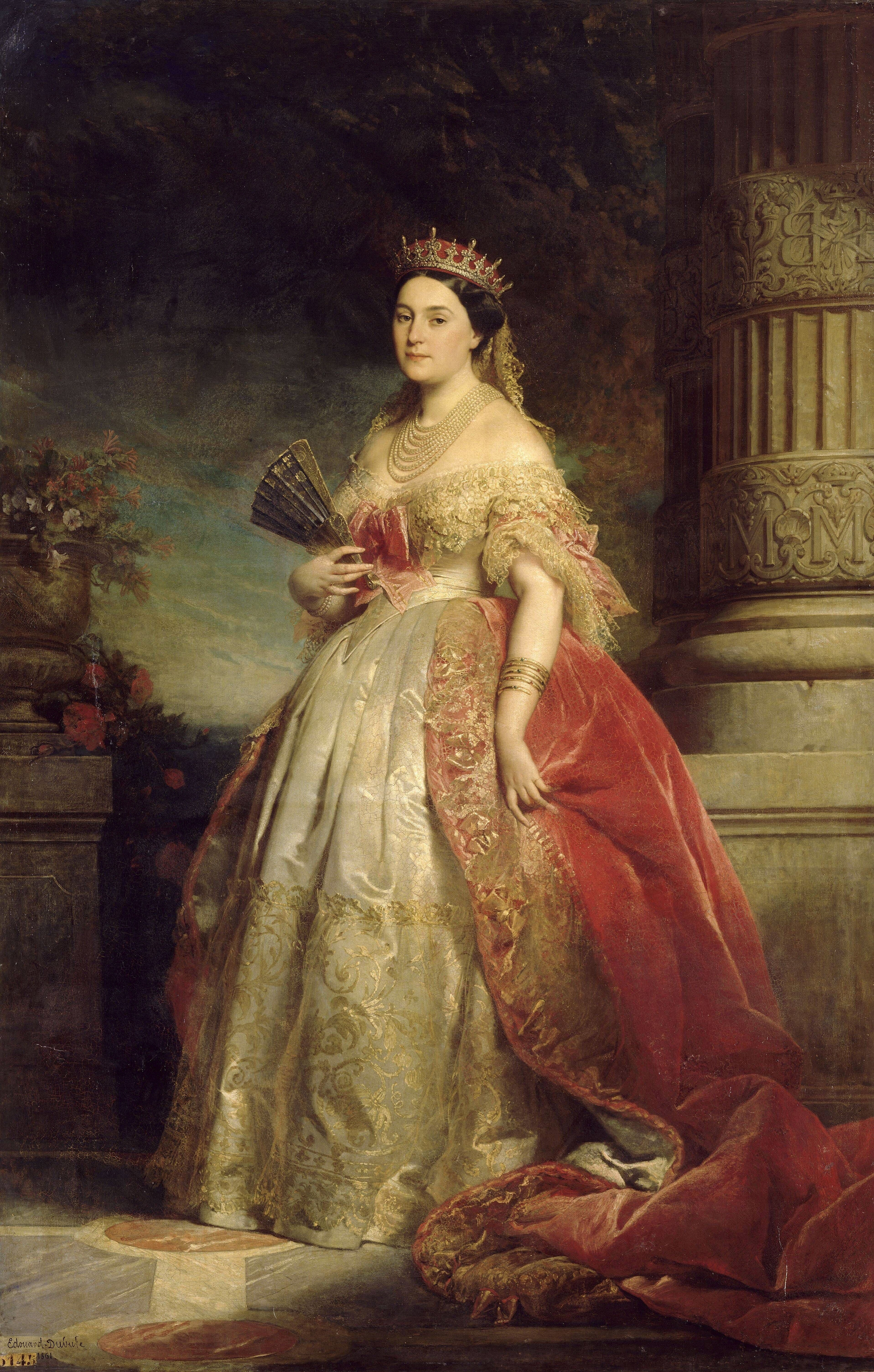
Portrait of Mathilde Bonaparte by Édouard Dubufe, 1861

Like his parents, Demidov was a great admirer of Napoleon I of France. He built a museum below the house of San Martino on Elba, where Napoleon had lived during his first exile, and he caused a mass to be sung at Portoferraio every 5 May (which is still sung today). In 1839, he was introduced by Jules Janin into the circle of Jérôme Bonaparte, former king of Westphalia, who was living in exile at the Villa di Quarto in Florence.

A plan to marry Jérôme's daughter princess Mathilde-Létizia Bonaparte to Demidov was quickly formed. It was agreed that she would receive a dowry of 50,000 francs in jewels (bought by Demidov for 1 million francs from Jérôme, always short of money) and 240,000 francs in money, payable in instalments. A decree of 20 October 1840 also made Demidov the Prince of San Donato to allow the princess to hold onto her title, though Demidov's princely title was never recognised in Russia. The marriage took place in Rome or Florence on 1 November 1840.

In March 1841, the couple went to Saint Petersburg, where the Tsar was full of attention for his first cousin Mathilde, through her mother, and losing no opportunity to humiliate Demidov by any means possible. In spite of this, Anatole began his own infidelities. On 17 August 1841, the couple arrived in Paris, where they lived at hôtel Demidoff at 109 rue Saint-Dominique until June 1842, when they moved to spend a year in Saint Petersburg before finally setting up home at the Villa San Donato. Their relationship soon soured, with Demidov refusing to give up his mistress Valentine de Sainte-Aldegonde, duchesse de Dino, following the princess taking Count Émilien de Nieuwerkerke as her lover.

Mathilde made a violent scene with Valentine during a costume ball in 1845 and in reply Demidov slapped her face twice in public. Separated since 1843, in September 1846 Mathilde fled to Paris to take refuge with Nieuwerkerke, taking with her the jewels from her dowry. Even so, Demidov was condemned by a tribunal in Saint Petersburg to send Mathilde an annual pension of 200,000 francs and was never able to recover his jewels.

In many ways, Demidov felt he deserved such punishment, and their separation was authorised in 1847 by a personal decision of tsar Nicholas I. Demidov's many other mistresses included Maria Calergis, considered one of the most beautiful women of her era, Ernestine Duverger, and Fanny de la Rochefoucauld (daughter of François, 8th Duke of La Rochefoucauld, with whom he had an illegitimate son.

=== Later life ===
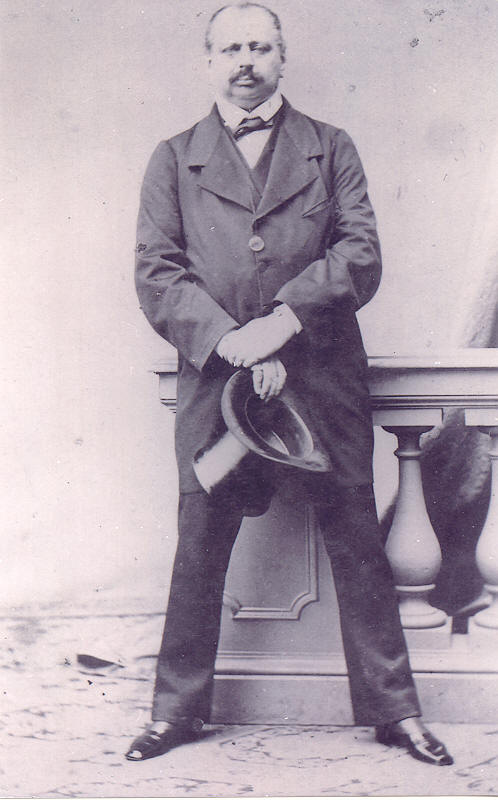
Anatole Demidoff, prince of San Donato (1813–1870). Unknown photographer.

Demidov tried to repair the damage the separation had done to his social standing by increasing his charitable donations. He created hospitals, orphanages and started an international committee to aid prisoners of the Crimean War, as well as giving 1 million roubles to finance that war for which tsar Alexander II of Russia made him chamberlain and Councillor of state. In 1860, he, the duc de Morny and doctor Oliffe made up the consortium of investors which founded the bathing resort at Deauville, and he took part in the famous Carnival de Paris, a painting at the musée Carnavalet shows his team taking part.

A bon viveur, two chicken dishes were named after him, including Chicken Demidoff—elaborately stuffed, smothered, trussed, and garnished, and the Demidoff name is also applied to dishes of rissoles and red snapper. He died in 1870 of a pulmonary congestion in his hotel on rue Saint-Dominique in Paris. Dying without legitimate issue, his title of Prince of San Donato passed to his nephew Pavel Pavlovitch Demidov.

== Works ==
- Anatolīĭ Demidov (principe di San Donato), André Durand, Denis Auguste Marie Raffet: Voyage pittoresque et archéologique en Russie par le Hâvre, Hambourg, Lubeck, Saint-Petersbourg, Moscou, Nijni-Novgorod, Yaroslaw et Kasan, exécutée en 1839 sous la direction de M. Anatole de Démidoff. Paris, Gihaut frères, [1840-1848]

Italian nobility
Preceded by Creation	Prince of San Donato; 1840-1870	Succeeded by Pavel Demidov
