= Édouard Dubufe =

French painter (1819–1883)

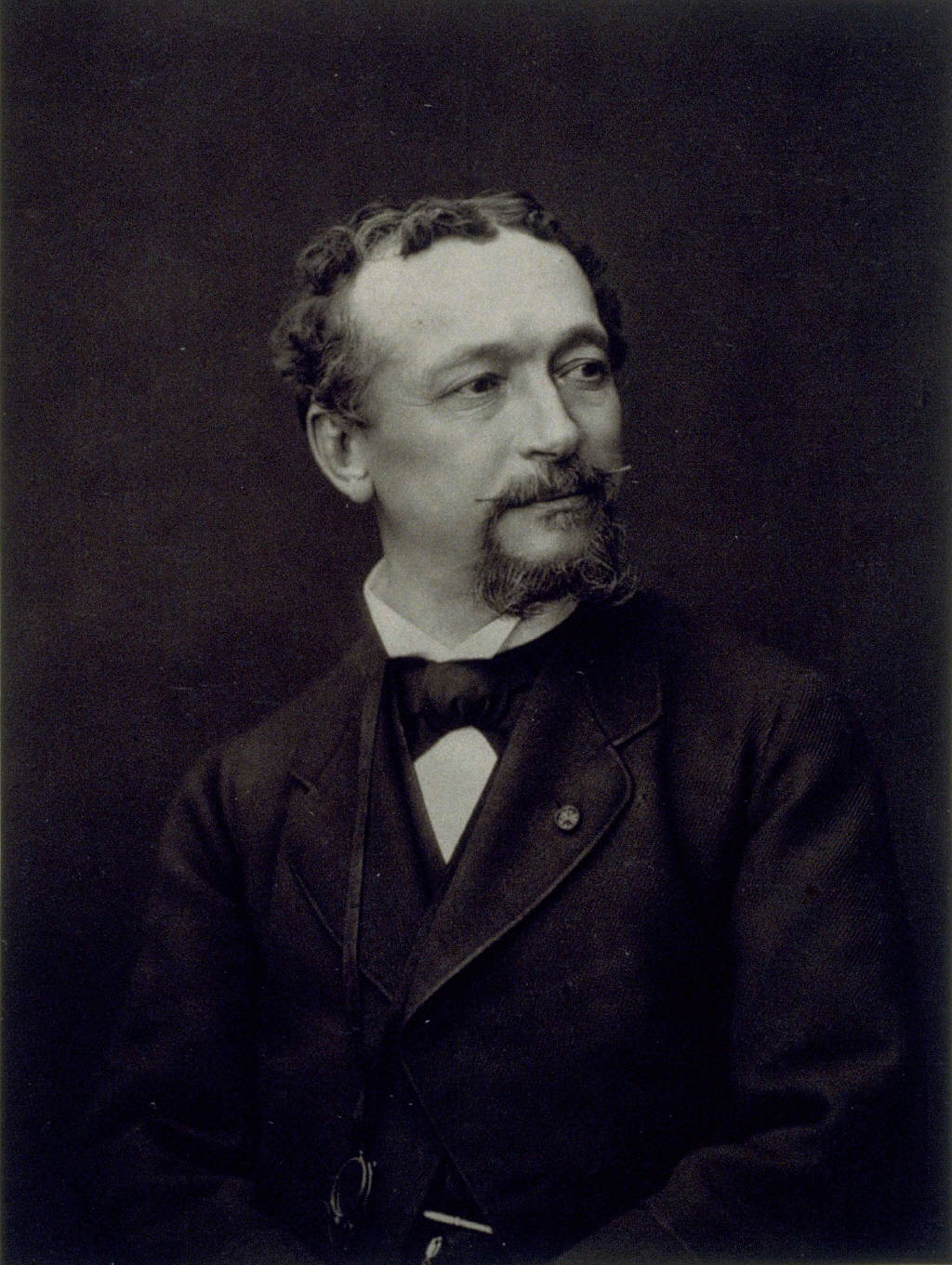
- Édouard Louis Dubufe (c.1880); photograph by Ferdinand Mulnier
- Born: Édouard Louis Dubufe; 31 March 1819; Paris, France
- Died: 11 August 1883 (aged 64); Versailles, France
- Education: Claude Marie Paul Dubufe (father); École des Beaux-arts
- Known for: Painter (portraits)

Édouard Louis Dubufe (French pronunciation: [edwaʁ lwi dybyf]; 31 March 1819 – 11 August 1883) was a French portrait painter.

== Biography ==
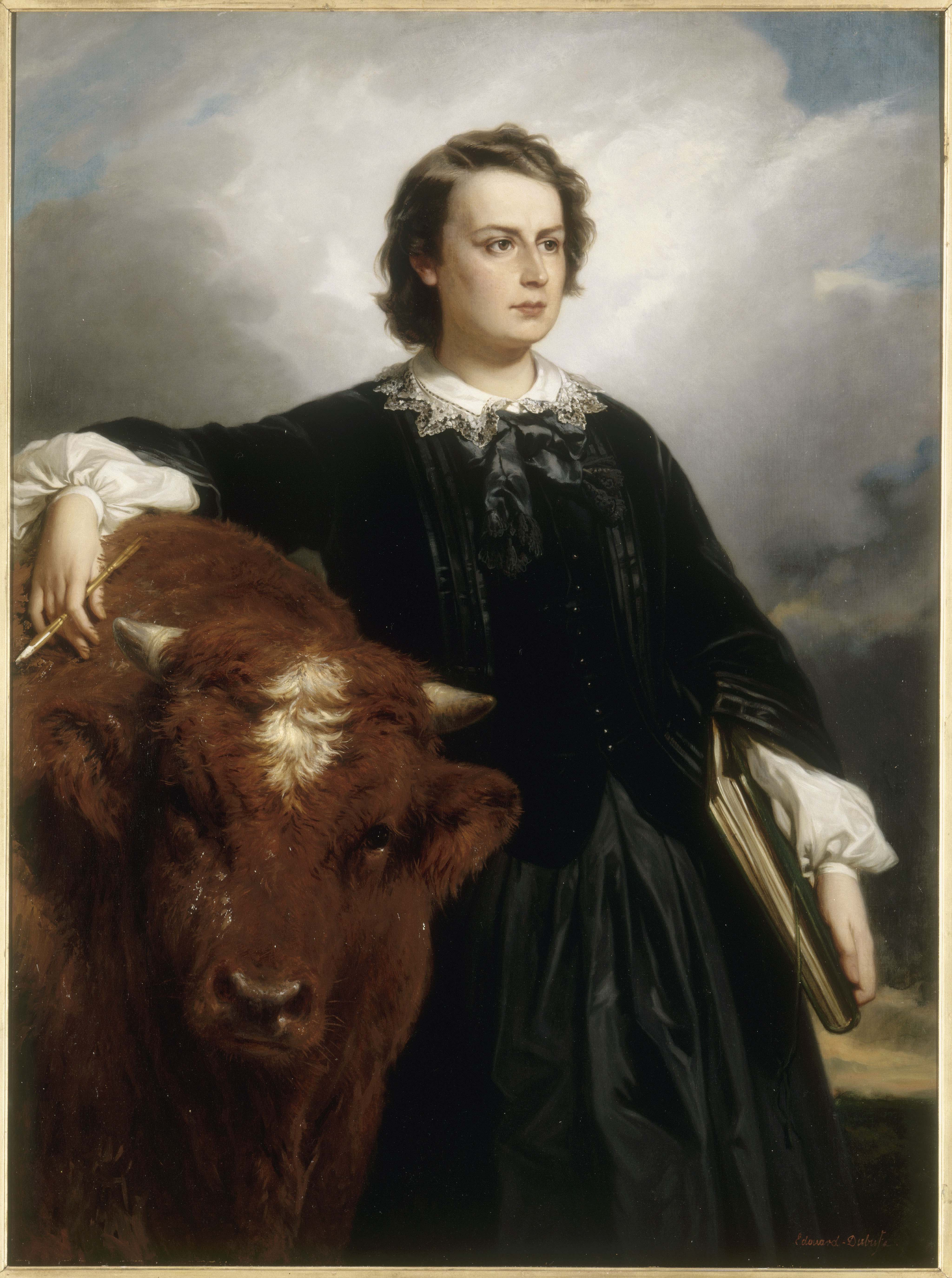
Rosa Bonheur with Bull (1857)

Dubufe was born in Paris. His father was the painter Claude Marie Paul Dubufe, who gave him his first art lessons. Later he studied with Paul Delaroche at the École des Beaux-arts. He was awarded the third-class medal at the "Salon des Artistes Français" in 1839.

In 1842, he married Juliette Zimmerman (the daughter of composer and pianist Pierre-Joseph-Guillaume Zimmerman) who was a sculptor. The composer Charles Gounod became Édouard's brother-in-law (and lifelong friend) when he married Juliette's sister Anna. During a stay in England, from 1848 to 1851, Dubufe discovered the great English portrait painters, who he would seek to emulate.

His official career as a portrait painter began in 1853 with portrayals of Emperor Napoléon III and the Empress Eugénie. That same year saw the birth of his son Guillaume, who would also become a well-known painter. In 1855, Juliette died in childbirth.

Dubufe continued to enjoy great success with the aristocracy, receiving a commission from the Emperor to paint the Congress of Paris in 1856. Later, the Empress asked for his assistance in decorating her "Salon Bleu" at the Tuileries Palace. In April 1866, the journal L'Événement ran an article by Émile Zola that criticized Dubufe's qualifications for acting as a judge at the Salon and suggested that he belonged to academic cliques that compromised his judgment.

That same year, Dubufe remarried. He died in Versailles on 11 August 1883 after a long illness.

== Works ==
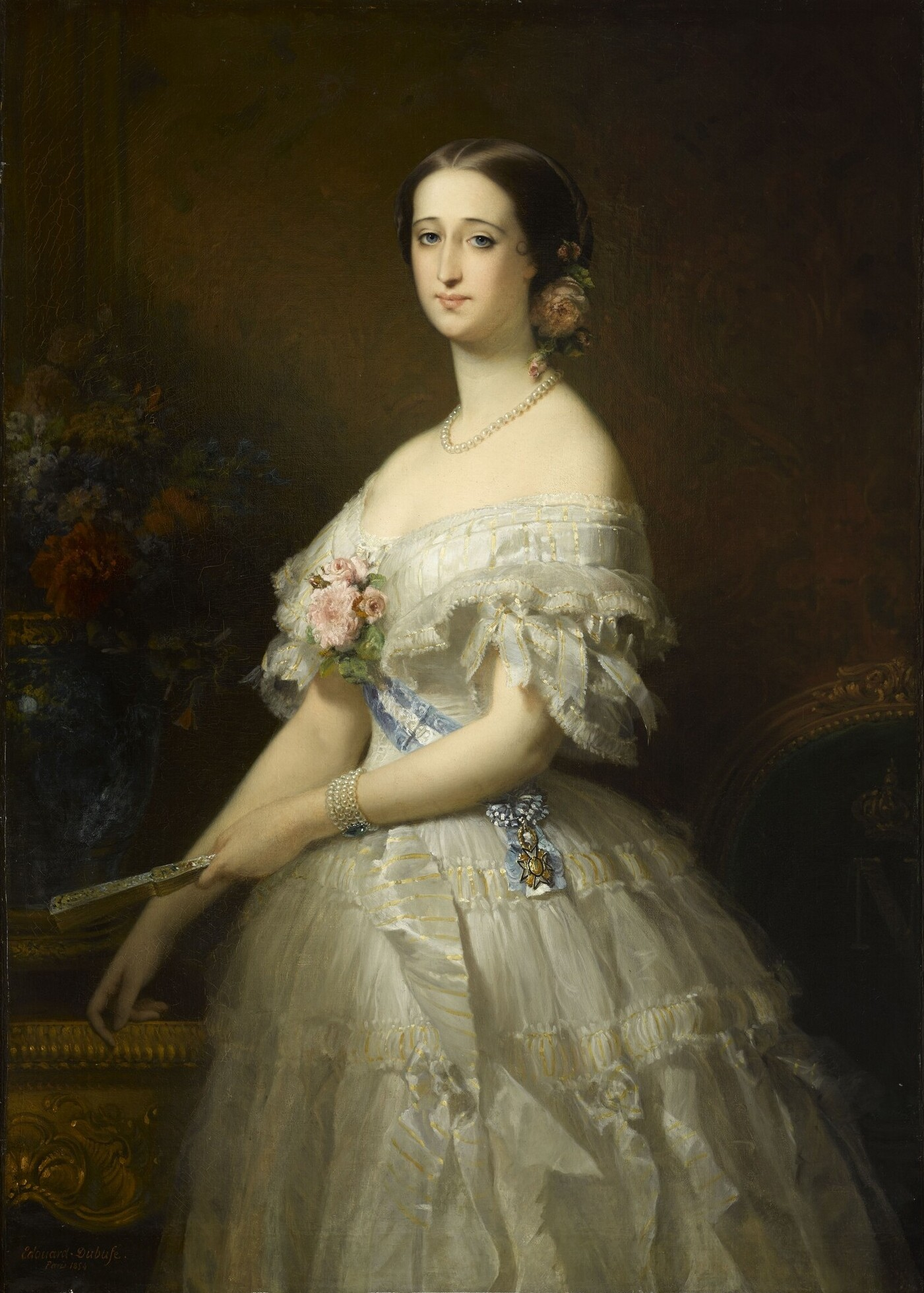
Eugénie de Montijo, Empress of the French, represented in a ball gown, 1854

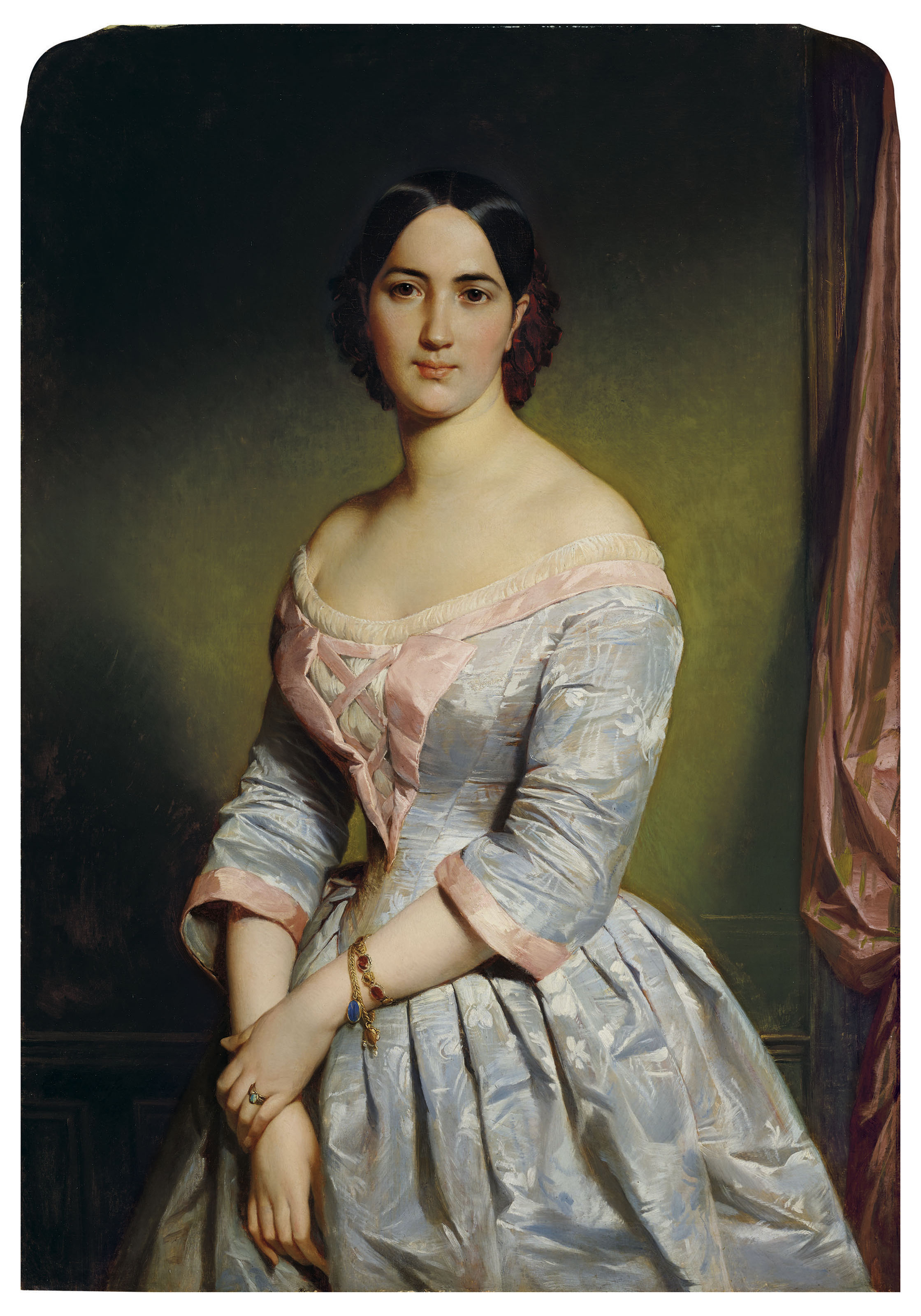
Anne-Arsene Charton, 1849

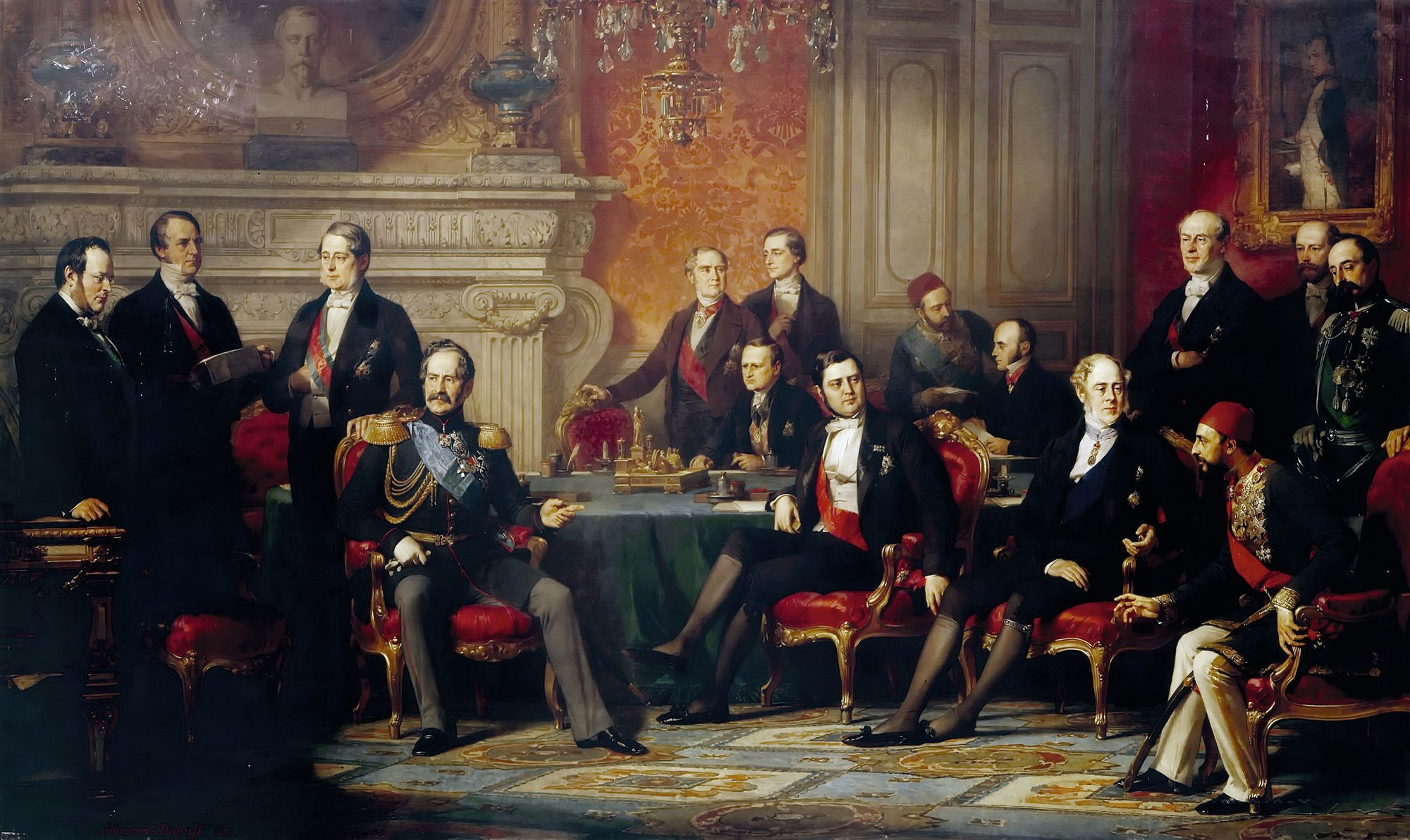
The Congress of Paris, 1856

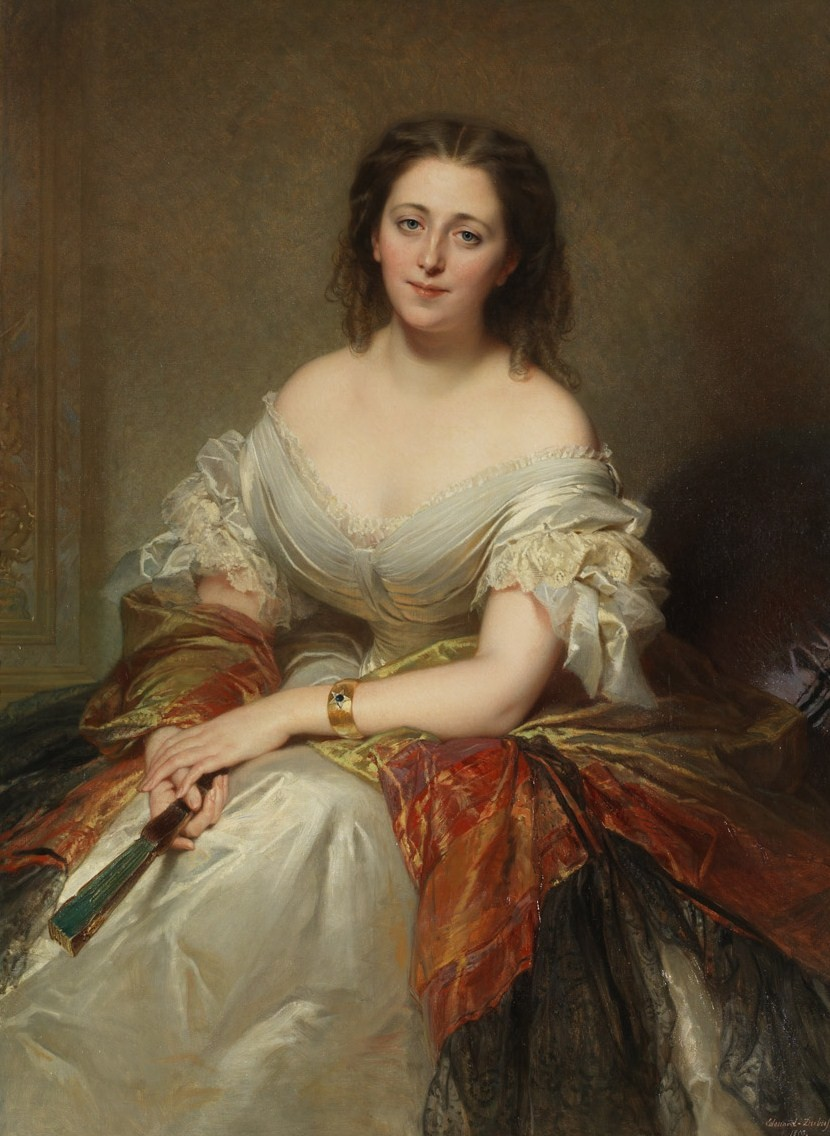
Comtesse Colonna Walewska, née Marianna Ricci, 1859

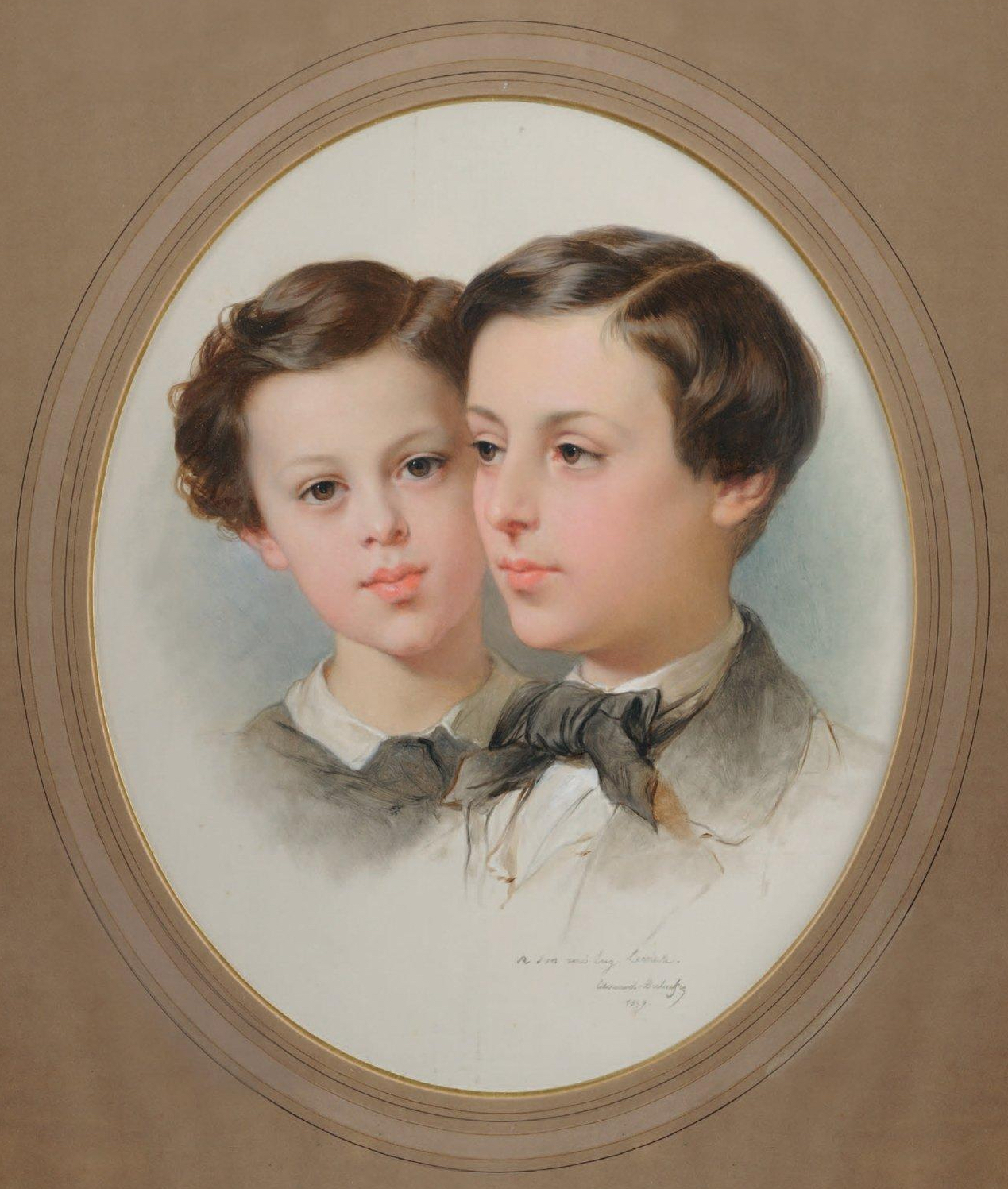
Jean Frédéric André Poupart, Baron de Neuflize, and his brother, 1859

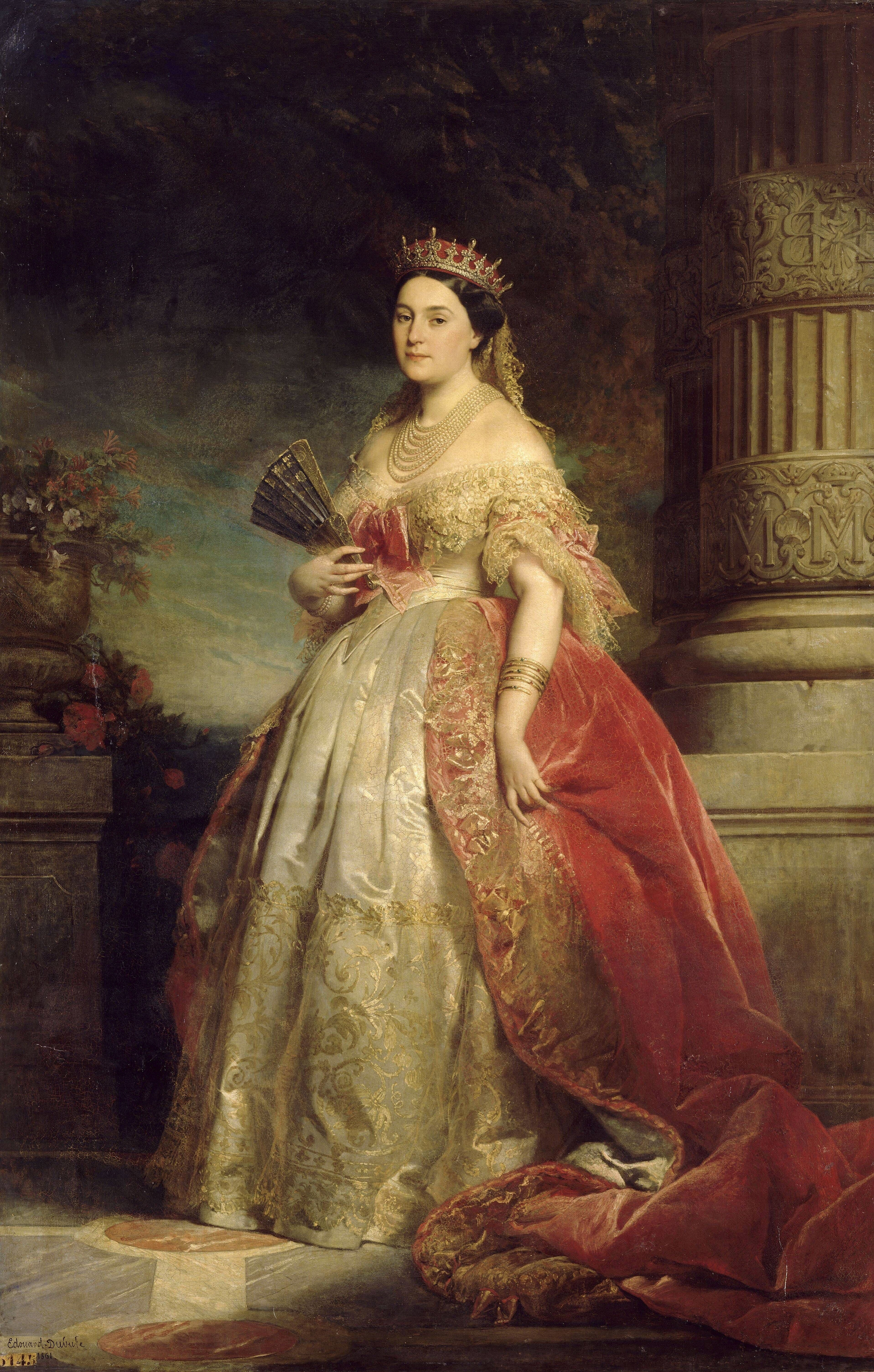
Portrait of Mathilde Bonaparte, 1861

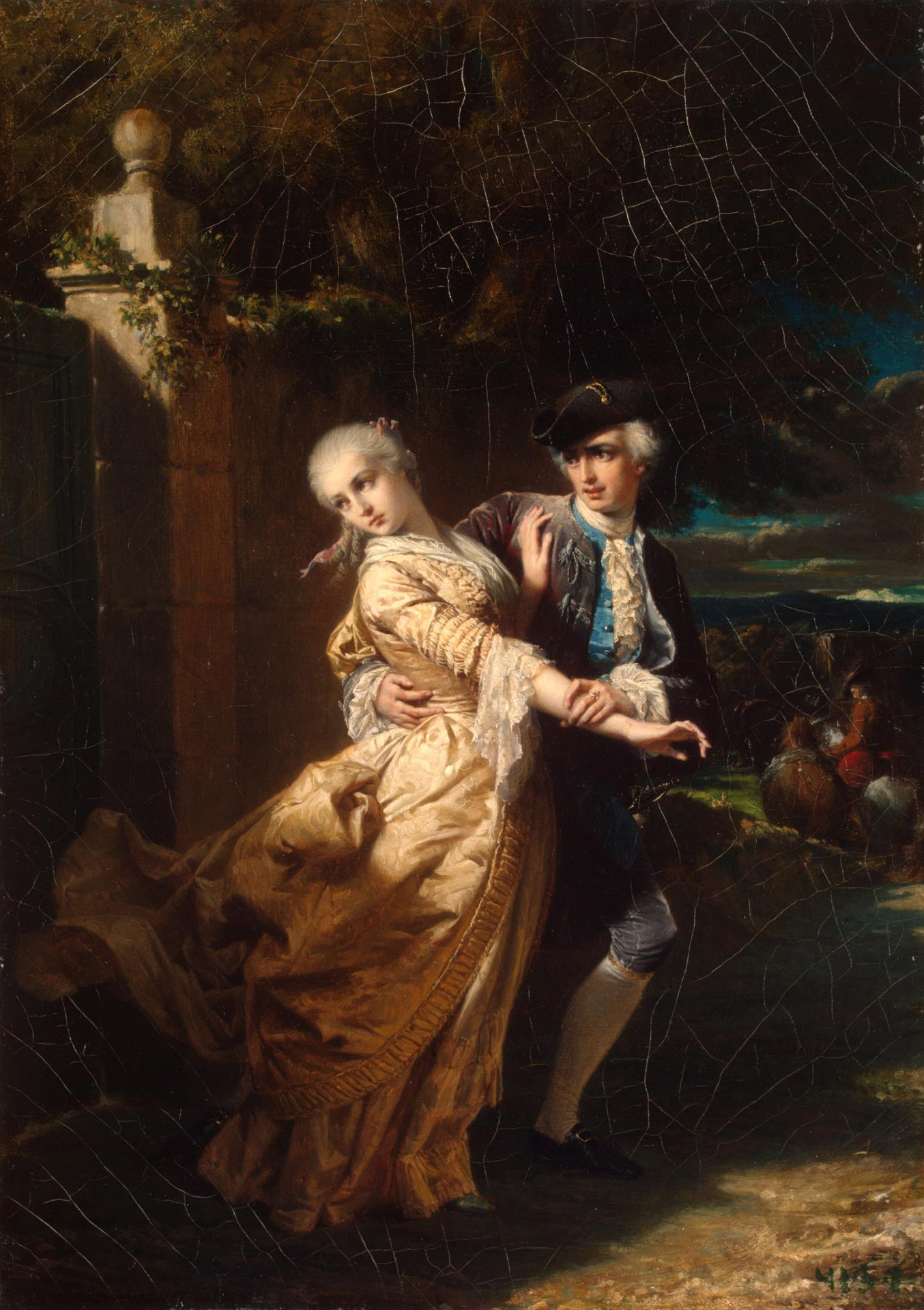
Lovelace Abducting Clarissa Harlowe, 1867

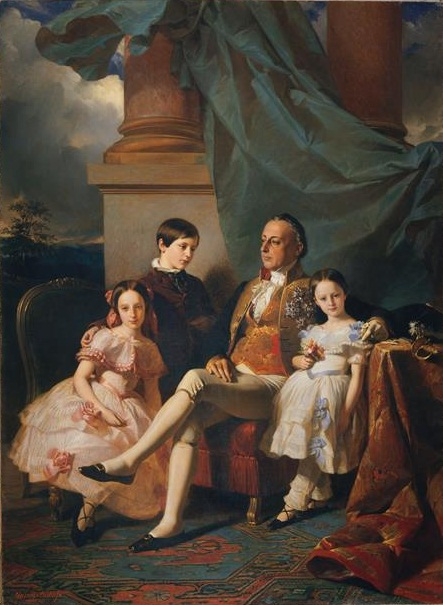
Prince Vincenzo Ruffo and his children, 1852

== Sources ==
- Whiteley, Jon (2003). "Dubufe, (Louis-)Edouard". Grove Art Online.
