= Nikita Akinfiyevich Demidov =

Russian businessman

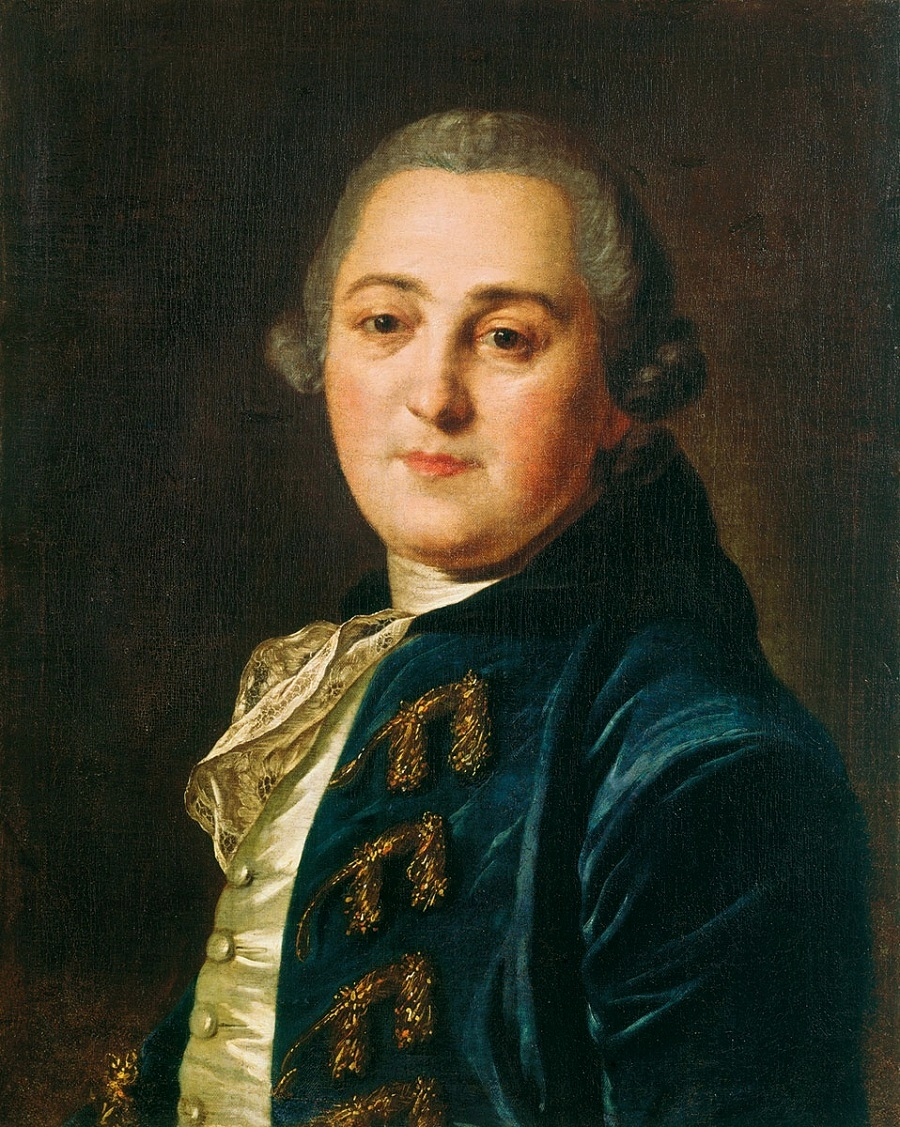
- Born: 7 September 1724
- Died: 7 May 1789 (aged 64)
- Occupations: Russian industrialist and arts patron

Nikita Akinfiyevich Demidov (Russian: Никита Акинфиевич Демидов) (7 September 1724 – 7 May 1789) was a Russian industrialist and arts patron.

== Life ==
He was the younger son of Akinfiy Demidov, brother of Prokofi Demidov and father of Nikolai Demidov.

He was married three times: firstly to Natalia Yakovlevna Evreinova (1732-1756), secondly to Maria Sverchkova (1644–1776) and thirdly to Alexandra Evtikhievna Safonova (1745-1778). His children from the first marriage were:

- Akinfiy Nikitich Demidov and
- Elizaveta Nikitichna Demidova.

From the third marriage:

- Jekaterina Nikitichna Lvova (1772-1832),
- Nikolai Nikitich Demidov and
- Maria Nikititchina Durnova (1776-1847).

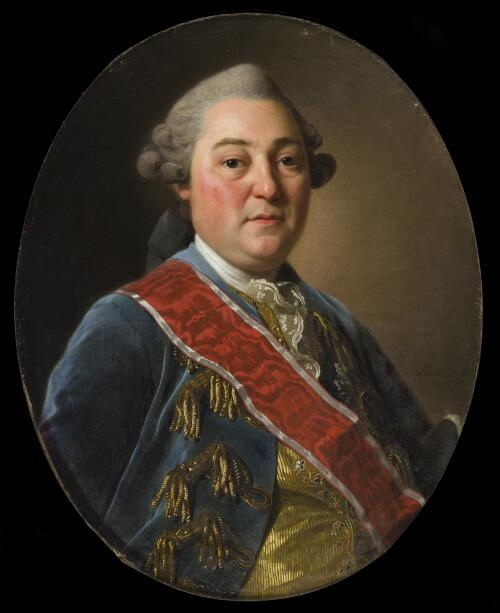
Portrait by Alexander Roslin, 1772

Inheriting mines and metallurgical factories in the Urals and Siberia, he was also a major landowner, with properties in central and southern Russia and in Italy. He left eight metallurgical factories, a huge annual income and 12,000 serfs to his son Nikolai on his death.

He was an amateur scientist, the first member of the Demidov family to protect the arts actively and a major traveller, journeying abroad to see Europe's industrial innovations, manners and culture.

In 1786 he published a Journal of his foreign travels, and also corresponded with Voltaire and Diderot.

In 1779 he set up a medal to reward a success in mechanics, to be decided by the Russian Academy of Sciences.
