= Prince Nikita Romanov =

Russian prince (1923–2007)

Prince Nikita Nikitich
- Born: 13 May 1923; London, England
- Died: 3 May 2007 (aged 83); New York City, U.S.
- Spouse: Janet Schonwald (m. 1961)
- Issue: Prince Fedor Nikitich
Names
- Nikita Nikitich Romanov
- House: Holstein-Gottorp-Romanov
- Father: Prince Nikita Alexandrovich of Russia
- Mother: Countess Maria Vorontsova-Dashkova

Prince Nikita Nikitich Romanov (13 May 1923 – 3 May 2007) was a British born American historian and writer, author of a book about Ivan the Terrible. He was a member of the Romanov family, a son of Prince Nikita Alexandrovich of Russia and a great nephew of Nicholas II of Russia, the last Tsar.

== Russian prince ==
He was born in London the son of Prince Nikita Alexandrovich of Russia and his wife Countess Mariya Ilarianovna Vorontzova-Daschkova. Prince Nikita was a grandson of Grand Duchess Xenia Alexandrovna and Grand Duke Alexander Mikhailovich of Russia and a great nephew of the last Russian Emperor, Nicholas II. He had one younger brother Prince Alexander Nikitich and together they spent their early years in Britain.

After serving in the British Army, Prince Nikita moved to the U.S. He attended the University of California, Berkeley where he graduated as a Master of Arts in history. He later taught history at San Francisco State University. In 1975 Prince Nikita co-authored the book Ivan the Terrible with Robert Payne.

Prince Nikita was married to Janet Schonwald and they had one son.

- Prince Fedor Nikitich Romanoff (1974–2007), a vegan who studied classical, Egyptian, and ancient languages at Columbia and Brown universities, where he received a master's degree with honors. He died by suicide, jumping from a window in Pompano Beach, Florida on 25 August 2007.

Nikita died a few months before his son, after suffering a stroke in New York City.

== Ancestry ==
Ancestors of Prince Nikita Romanov

8. Grand Duke Michael Nikolaevich of Russia
4. Grand Duke Alexander Mikhailovich of Russia
9. Princess Cecilie of Baden
2. Prince Nikita Alexandrovich of Russia
10. Alexander III of Russia
5. Grand Duchess Xenia Alexandrovna of Russia
11. Princess Dagmar of Denmark
1. Prince Nikita Nikitich of Russia
12. Count Illarion Ivanovich Vorontsov-Dashkov
6. Count Illarion Illarionovich Vorontsov-Dashkov
13. Countess Elizabeth Andreevna Shuvalov
3. Countess Maria Illarionovna Vorontsova-Dashkova
14. Vasili Lvovich Narychkin
7. Irina Vasilevna Narychkina
15. Princess Fevronia Pavlovna Jambakur-Orbeliani
