= Elizabeth Vorontsova-Dashkova =

Russian courtier (1845–1924)

Countess Elizabeth Vorontzova-Dashkova
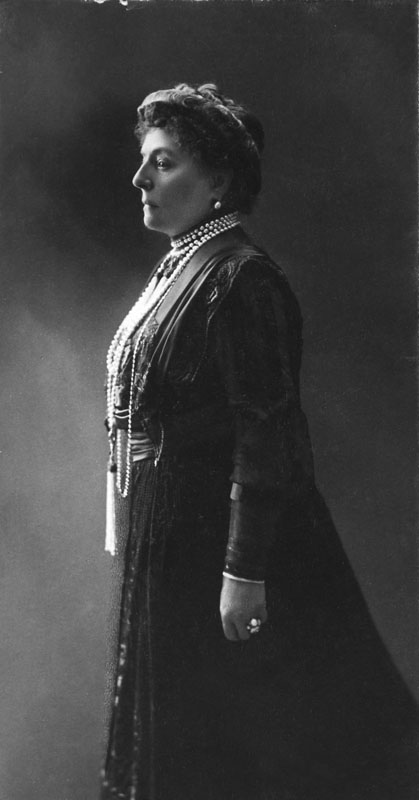
- Born: Elizaveta Shuvalova; 6 August 1845; Saint Petersburg, Russian Empire
- Died: 28 July 1924 (aged 78); Wiesbaden, Germany
- Spouses: Illarion Ivanovich Vorontsov-Dashkov (m. 1867, wid. 1916)
- Issue: Ivan Vorontsov Dashkov; Alexandra Vorontsov-Dashkov; Sophia Vorontsov-Dashkov; Maria Vorontsov-Dashkov; Irina Vorontsov-Dashkov; Roman Vorontsov-Dashkov; Hillarion Vorontsov-Dashkov; Alexander Vorontsov-Dashkov
- Father: Andrei Pavlovich Shuvalov
- Mother: Sophia Michaelovna Vorontsova

Countess Elizabeth Andreievna Vorontsova-Dashkova, née Countess Shuvalova (6 August 1845 - 28 July 1924), known as Lily was a lady-in-waiting at the Russian Court, as well as the wife of Count Illarion Vorontsov-Dashkov, Minister of the Imperial Properties and Viceroy of the Caucasus. She was also a knight dame in the Order of Saint Catherine. While she was officially a lady-in-waiting to Anastasia of Montenegro from 1896, she was known for her friendship to Maria Feodorovna. All Lily's four daughters would serve as ladies-in-waiting to Maria Feodorovna; Alexandra and Sophia from 1889, Maria from 1890 and Irina from 1891 onwards.

== Biography ==
=== Early years ===
Elizabeth, known as "Lily" was born as the eldest child of Andrei Pavlovich Shuvalov (1817-1876), Active State Councillor, and Sophia Voronstova (1825-1879). The marriage was unhappy and the couple lived in separate houses. According to S. D. Sheremetev, Sophia was "a harmless and completely colorless creature, never distinguished by beauty and extremely underdeveloped physically and mentally" While Andrei carried on an affair, Sophia raised Lily and her younger siblings Paul (1846), Catherine (1848), Michael (1850) and Maria (1856) alone.

=== Marriage ===
On 22 January, 1867, she married her fourth cousin, Count Illarion Vorontsov-Dashkov, in what was described as a hasty wedding. Originally, Grand Duke Alexander had wanted his friend Illarion to marry Maria Meshcherskaya, his own lover, but he chose Lily instead. The union was described as happy. When Lily fell ill in 1876, Count Vorontsov-Dashkov refused to serve to stay with his wife, and informed Maria Feodorovna by telegrams about the progress of the recovery.

Illarion and Lily had eight children:

1. Ivan "Vanya" Vorontsov-Dashkov (29 April 1868 - 8 December 1897), who married Varvara Orlova and had three children. His son Illarion (1893-1920) died in the Russian Revolution. In 1908, his widow had an illegitimate child with Grand Duke Sergei Mikhailovich of Russia.
2. Alexandra "Sandra" Vorontsova-Dashkova (6 September 1869 - 11 July 1959), who married Count Shuvalov and had eight children. Her son Nikolai (1896-1914) died in the First World War, and her son Paul (1891 - 1919) died in the Russian Revolution.
3. Sophia "Sophka" Vorontsova-Dashkova (9 August 1870 - 16 April 1953), who married Count Elim Demidov, son of Maria Meshcherskaya.
4. Maria "Maya" Voronstova-Dashkova (6 September 1871 - 13 September 1927), who married Count Musin-Pushkin and had five children.
5. Irina "Ira" Vorontsova-Dashkova (2 December 1872 - 3 January 1959), who married Count Sheremetev and had eight children. Her son Nikolai married Princess Irina Yusupova, and her daughter Praskovia married Prince Roman of Russia.
6. Roman "Romashka" Vorontsov-Dashkov (24 June 1874 - 1 April 1893)
7. Hillarion Vorontsov-Dashkov(12 May 1877 - 20 April 1932), who married Irina Naryshkina and had five children. His daughter Maria married Prince Nikita of Russia.
8. Alexander Vorontsov-Dashkov (22 April 1881 - 4 October 1938), who married Anna Chavchavadze and had three children.

The couple was quite wealthy, owning more than 160.000 acres of land, including 10 oil fields. It was said that "Count Illarion was rich, but his wife was even richer!" Illarion and Lily were close to Emperor Alexander III and his wife, Maria Feodorovna, and they often hunted and played cards together. After Alexander III's death, Nicholas II considered them intimates as he had grown up around the Vorontsov children, who were of his age. His sister Olga was fond of the eldest Vorontsov-Dashkov daughter Sandra.

In the 1890s, Lily suffered multiple losses. In 1893, her son Romashka died unexpectedly at the age of 19 the night before her sister's wedding. Just four years later, her eldest son Ivan died of an infection after a hunt. Lily was also upset with her son Hillarion for not having consulted herself and her husband before proposing to Irina Naryshkina. After the death of her childless brother Michael in 1903, Lily inherited the vast holdings of the younger Shuvalov line, including the Pargolovo estate and the Vorontsov Palace in Alupka, which she restored. In 1905, Lily's son-in-law Count Shuvalov, mayor of Moscow, was killed by a terrorist.

=== Caucasus years ===
From 1905 to 1915, Illarion Vorontsov-Dashkov was Viceroy of the Caucasus, which meant he and Lily moved to Tiflis. As her husband's illness progressed, Lily ruled in his stead with a "wilful and decisive character". Deputy Nikolay Chkheidze complained to the Duma that "the Caucasian Army is commanded not by the Supreme Commander-in-Chief or the Viceroy, but by Countess Vorontsova-Dashkova!"

Grand Duke Cyril reported: "Poor Count Vorontsov-Dashkov has lost all control. The Countess does not let anyone see him, personally receives all reports and personally manages the entire Caucasus, both the civilian and military parts." She had a reputation of being stern, proud, intimidating and inaccessible. However, she was also known for her bravery. During the panic in Tiflis that occurred in December 1914 due to the failures of the Russian army at Sarykamysh, Elizaveta Andreyevna was offered to evacuate, to which she received the Countess’s answer: “Only cowards run away. Instead of organizing the defense of their native land, their native city, part of the population, especially the Armenians, are shamefully fleeing, not sparing any means for this. I will not leave."

The Count left the Caucasus with his wife and son Alexander shortly before his death, which occurred on January 15, 1916 in Alupka . Empress Alexandra Feodorovna wrote on that day: “Poor Countess Vorontsova. She will miss her dear old husband…”

Her last meeting with the Empress took place on 8 February 1917. After the revolution, the Countess left for Yessentuki, where most of the family soon gathered. She was later arrested and imprisoned in Pyatigorsk . During the offensive of the Volunteer Army, the Vorontsov-Dashkovs managed to leave Russia: in April 1919, Lily and the family of the Countess's youngest daughter I. I. Sheremeteva left her Alupka Palace on one of the English ships, heading for Malta .

Countess Elizaveta Andreevna Vorontsova-Dashkova died in 1924 and was buried in the Wiesbaden cemetery.

== Legacy ==
Grand Duchess Olga Alexandrovna remembered Lily as her mother's favourite lady in her memoirs, writing that despite having eight children neither husband nor children interfered with her attendance at court and that

"Her capacity for gossip was incredible. She could smell scandal for miles. And I am afraid my mother liked listening to her. Newspapers in those days did not print idle title-tattle, especially not the Russian newspapers. And Lily Vorontsov had the art of building a story out of someone's imprudent hint. I disliked her, though I had to be very polite to her - for the sake of peace. Still, I became rather fond of Sandra, her eldest daughter."

The 2016 Broadway Musical "Anastasia" features both Empress Maria Feodorovna and her favourite lady-in-waiting, Countess Lily Malevsky-Malevich. It is thought that the latter character was based on Lily Vorontsova-Dashkova.

The actress Anne Wiazemsky is Countess Vorontsova's great-great-granddaughter.
