= Maria Meshcherskaya =

Russian lady-in-waiting (1844–1868)

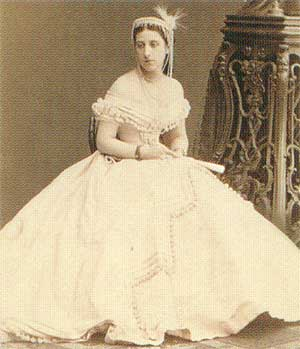
- Born: Maria Elimovna Meshcherskaya; 13 July 1844
- Died: 2 July 1868 (aged 24)
- Spouse: Pavel Pavlovich Demidov (m. 1867)
- Issue: Elim Pavlovich Demidov
- House: Meshchersky
- Father: Elim Petrovich Meshchersky
- Mother: Varvara Stepanova Zhikhareva

Princess Maria Elimovna Meshcherskaya (Russian: Мари́я Эли́мовна Меще́рская; 13 July 1844 – 2 July 1868) was a Russian noblewoman. She is known for her love affair with the future Alexander III of Russia, who attempted to renounce his place as heir to the throne in order to marry her, a plan he was forced to abandon. She married Pavel Pavlovich Demidov, 2nd Prince of San Donato in 1866.

== Early life ==
Princess Maria Elimovna Meshcherskaya was born into an old House of Meshchersky. She was the daughter of the diplomat and poet Prince Elim Petrovich Meshchersky and his wife, Varvara Stepanovna Zhikhareva (1819–1879), the daughter of the writer S. P. Zhikharev. In 1844, when Maria was not yet a year old, her father died. Maria Elimovna spent her childhood in Paris and Nice, constantly moving between her mother and grandmother. Abroad, Varvara Stepanovna, who was known for her lovers, later marrying Count Borbon del Monte, lead such an eccentric lifestyle that Empress Alexandra Feodorovna took her daughter and placed Varvara in an institute.

The Empress was forced to turn for help to her relative Princess Elizaveta Nikolaievna Chernysheva (widow of the Minister of War Alexander Chernyshyov), and asked her to take Maria in. When she was eighteen years old, Maria was received into the house of her aunt, Princess Elizabeth Baryatinskaya (1826–1902). But the Princess was jealous of her niece because her husband was particularly attached to the girl – some sources even say in love.

"It cannot be said that Princess Baryatinskaya spoiled her. On the contrary, she rather kept her in a black body. She took the last place in the house..."

— Count Sergei Dmitrievich Sheremetev

== Romance with Grand Duke Alexander ==
Not long after, her relatives petitioned and Maria became a lady-in-waiting to Empress Maria Alexandrovna and settled in the Winter Palace.

In the spring of 1864, at the court, Maria met with the Grand Duke Alexander Alexandrovich, the second son of the Empress. Her name appeared in the Grand Duke's letters. In June of the same year, he wrote to his mother:

"We went with the company to Pavlovsk to the farm and drank tea there. M. E. Meshcherskaya also rode with us on horseback and often visited Pavlovsk with us."

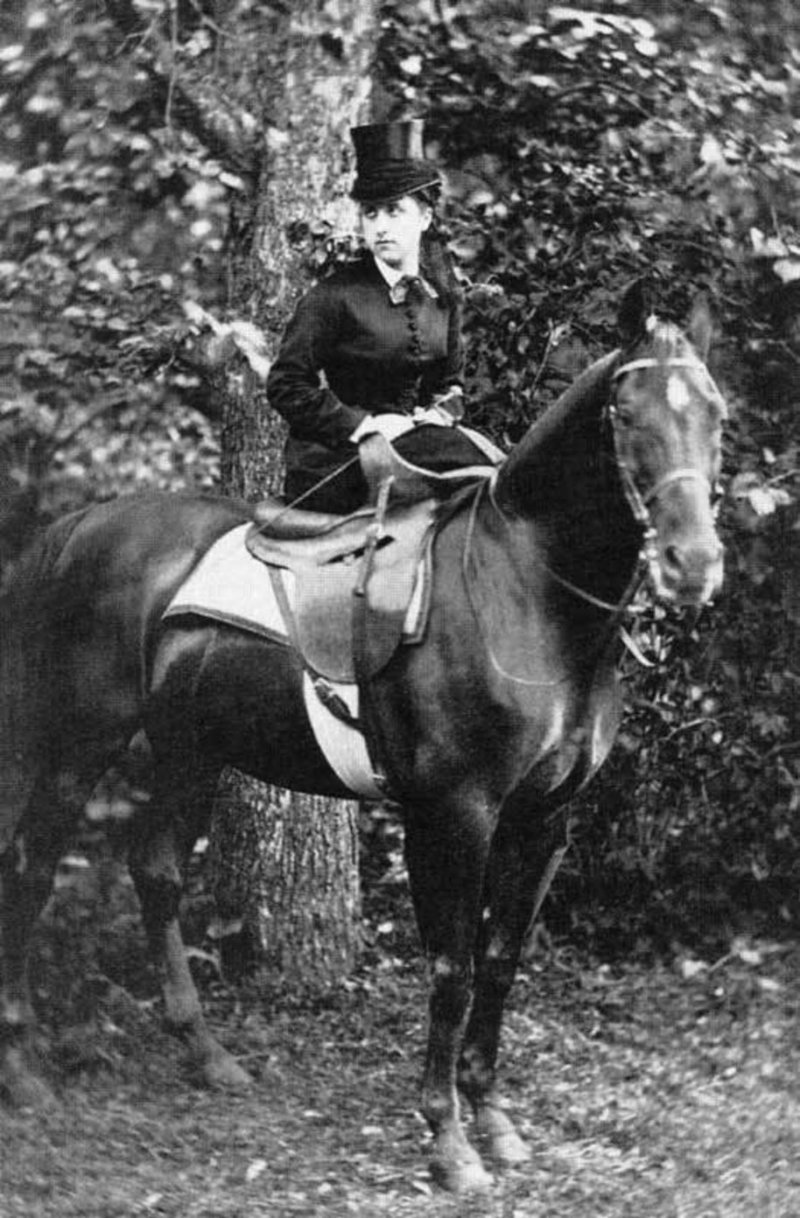
Princess Maria Elimovna Mescherskaja on horseback

Gradually she is included in the company formed at the court from the representatives of the "golden youth". In addition to the Grand Duke Alexander, it included: Tsarevich Nikolai, Grand Duke Vladimir, and their cousins Nikolai of Leuchtenberg, Nikolai Konstantinovich, Prince Meshchersky, Count Illarion Vorontsov-Dashkov, Prince Vladimir Baryatinsky, and lady-in-waiting Alexandra Zhukovskaya. The youth had fun, danced, played cards, and more and more often Alexander tried to choose Maria as a partner. According to a contemporary, the Princess was "extraordinarily beautiful, wonderfully built, rather tall, her black eyes, deep and passionate, gave her graceful face an extraordinary charm. The sound of her voice was methodical, and the stamp of some mysteriously restrained sad feeling, very charming, was imposed on her whole being."

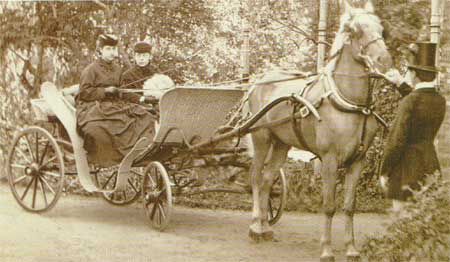
Princess Meshcherskaya and Alexandra Zhukovskaya for a walk in Tsarskoye Selo Park, 1865

In 1865, Tsarevich Nikolai Alexandrovich died, and Alexander became the heir apparent to the throne. In the same year, the feelings of the Grand Duke also changed: from friendly to something more serious. On June 7, he wrote in his diary:

"Every day is the same, it would be unbearable if it were not for M."

They allegedly met by chance on a walk in the park, but soon the Emperor and Empress learned about this relationship. Maria Alexandrovna found this behavior of her son "indecent". On June 19 on the English road from Tsarskoe Selo to Pavlovsk, the Tsarevich said that "they can no longer be in such a relationship as they were up to now." As a souvenir, Marie presented her photo with Sasha Zhukovskaya with the inscription: "In remembrance of the last day in dear Tsarskoe." On November 4 of the same year, the Princess gave Alexander her self-portrait.

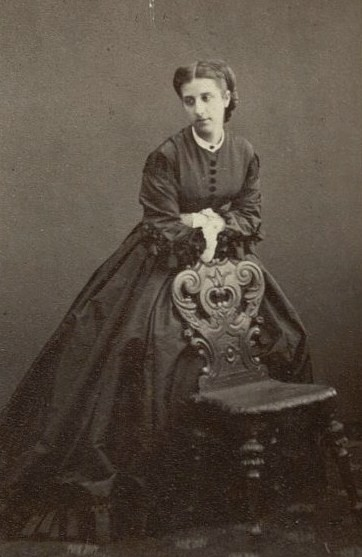
Maria Elimovna Mescherskaja 1864

Maria's cousin, Vladimir Meshchersky, stole the letters to her from the heir to the throne and handed them over to the Empress, after which a scandal erupted in the Imperial family though they continued to meet. They were helped by Alexandra Zhukovskaya, who delivered notes, settled disagreements, and guarded the peace during walks. The Tsarevich was not sure of Maria's feelings, he was afraid that she might accept someone elses proposal, so he offered his close friend and heir to a huge fortune, Count Illarion Vorontsov-Dashkov, to marry Maria. However, the count soon married Countess Elizaveta Shuvalova.

The meetings became more frequent, and Meshcherskaya was reprimanded. Countess Catherine von Tiesenhausen (1803-1888) claimed that the Maria was behaving indecently, openly running after the heir apparent. And in order to avoid 'serious consequences' she must stop seeing the Tsarevich. In November 1865, Alexander II expressed a desire for the Tsarevich and Nikolai's former bride, the Danish princess Dagmar of Denmark, to marry. The Tsarevich felt conflicted between his feelings for Meshcherskaya and duty. He wrote in his diary on March 15: “I really love her, and if I were a free man, I would certainly marry her, and I am sure that she would completely agree”.

At a ball on April 18, Meshcherskaya informed the heir that Prince zu Sayn-Wittgenstein-Sayn had proposed to her. The Tsarsevich's parents insisted on a trip to Denmark, and in May he wrote in his diary: “I only think now about giving up my plight and, if possible, marrying sweet M.E. I want to refuse to marry Dagmar, which I cannot love and do not want ... Maybe it will be better if I renounce the throne ... I do not want another wife, like M. E.". At the same time, the Grand Duke feared that “when the decisive moment comes, she will abandon me, and then everything was lost”.

In May 1866 the Emperor announced that an article was published in Danish newspapers that the Tsarevich did not want to marry Dagmar because of his feelings for Meshcherskaya. Christian IX of Denmark sent a letter to the Imperial family asking them to confirm the heir's plans for his daughter. There was a major quarrel, during which Alexander declared his desire to abdicate the throne and marry 'dear Dusenka', which was not understood by Alexander II, who threatened to expel Maria. After himself explaining with Maria, Alexander decided to go to Denmark. The only thing he asked his father was not to punish the girl. The Empress reassured her son that Meshcherskaya would go to Paris with her aunt Princess Chernysheva.

The engagement of Tsarevich Alexander and Princess Dagmar of Denmark took place on June 17, 1866 and a wedding followed on October 28. Princess Meshcherskaya saw the heir again in 1867 in Paris, where he came with his father at the invitation of Emperor Napoleon III.

== Later life ==
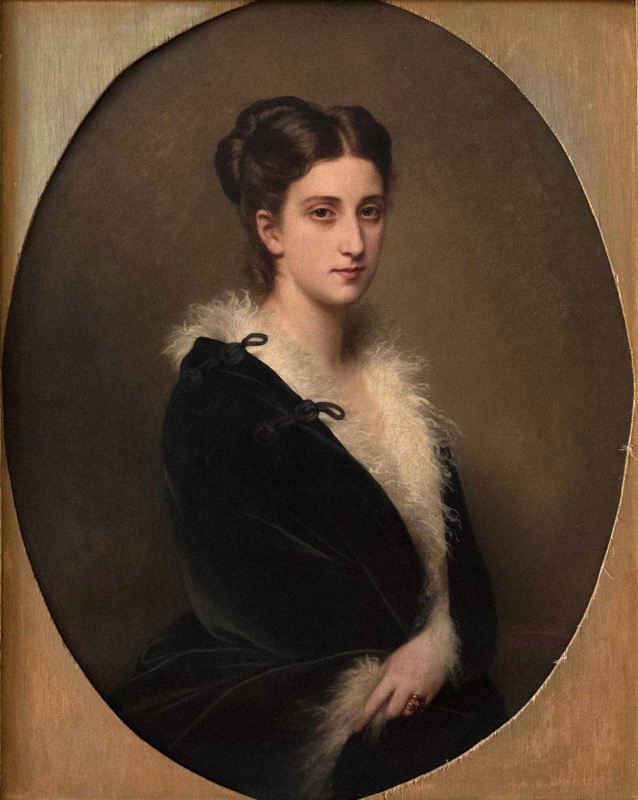
Maria Mescherskaja Demidova

After leaving the Imperial court, Maria lived with Princess Chernysheva. In March 1867, at the Austrian court, she met the secretary of the Russian embassy in Vienna, the wealthy Pavel Pavlovich Demidov (1839–1885). On June 7, 1867, their wedding was celebrated. The guarantors for the groom were Prince Alexander Ivanovich Baryatinsky and Baron Andrey Fedorovich von Budberg-Bönninghausen (1817-1881); the guarantors for the bride were Count Dmitry Karlovich von Nesselrode (1816-1891) and Count Illarion Ivanovich Vorontsov-Dashkov. The young couple spent their honeymoon near Florence at the Villa San Donato. Demidov adored his young wife and surrounded her with luxury. Maria Elimovna had the most beneficial influence on her husband. According to a contemporary, after marriage, Demidov became a completely different person, his crazy spending and evenings in the casino stopped.

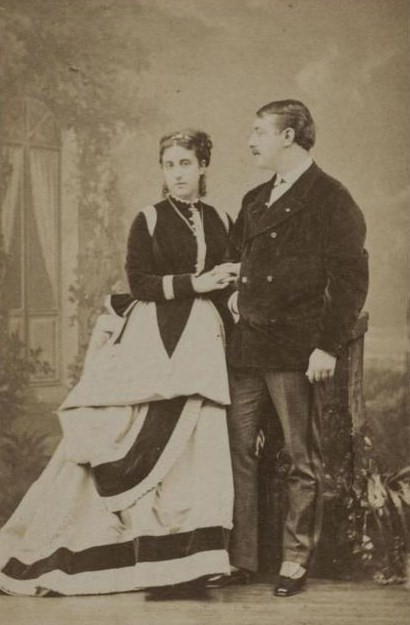
Маria and Paul Demidov

In the spring of 1868, before the birth of her son, Maria and her husband moved to Vienna in order to seek the advice of a famous professor. In Vienna, she often went to church, where she was seen praying in tears. Her pregnancy was difficult, mother-in-law Aurora Karamzin came to Vienna from Finland in order to support her son and daughter-in-law. The women became good friends and spent a lot of time together.

On July 25, 1868, Maria Elimovna gave birth to her son Elim, named after her own father, and died the next day from eclampsia. The doctors managed to save the boy, who was also in danger. On the eve of her death, Maria Elimovna confessed to her friend A. Zhukovskaya that “she never loved anyone except the Tsarevich.” Her husband found a letter addressed to him, in which she said goodbye to him and thanked him for the happiness that he gave her, which had lasted less than a year.

Grief-stricken, Demidov refused to see his son for several months, and considered himself the culprit in his wife's death. He starved himself and was on the verge of suicide. Meanwhile, his mother Aurora Karamzin took care of the little Elim. After meeting with some Jesuits, Pavel came to his senses and became very religious. He lived modestly, often took walks, no longer wore a tailcoat, and spent a lot of money on charity work. In memory of his wife, he established the Mariinsky needlework workshop for 200 women in Paris. In 1871, he married secondly Princess Elena (Hélène) Petrovna Trubetskaya (1853-1917) and had six more children.

Princess Maria Demidova was buried in Vienna at the Orthodox cemetery of St. Mark. Allegedly, her ashes was later transported to the Demidov family tomb at the Père Lachaise Cemetery in Paris, though, according to the diary of Grand Duke Alexander Alexandrovich in 1880, her ashes were still in France.
