= Petrovskoye-Alabino =

Coordinates: 55.532599°N 36.995889°E

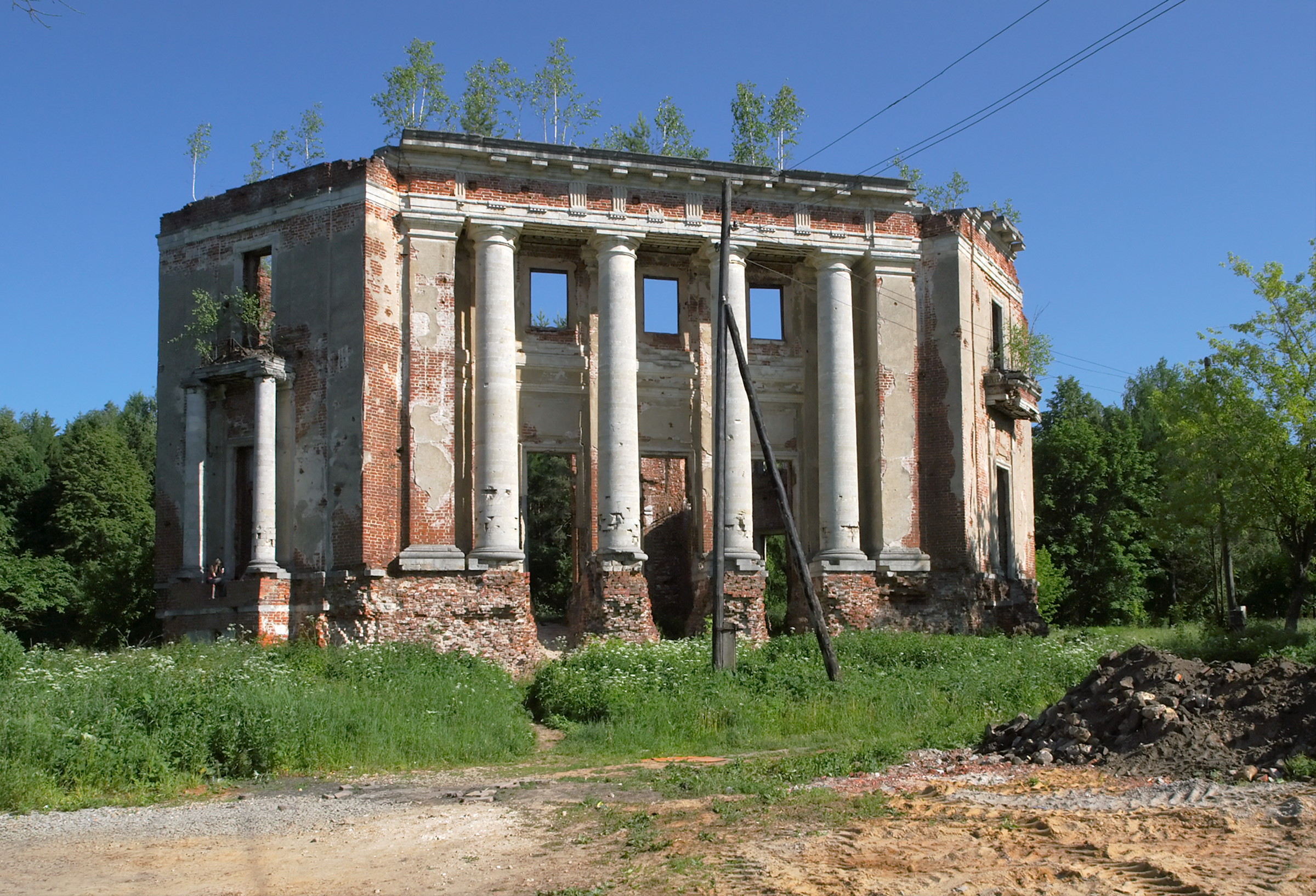
Northwest façade, 2011

Petrovskoye-Alabino (Russian: Петро́вское-Ала́бино) is a ruined country house near the village of Alabino, in the Naro-Fominsky District of the Moscow Oblast. It is sited near the Desna River, about 50 kilometres (31 mi) southwest of Moscow, beside the route towards Kyiv. The classical house was built in the late 18th century, probably designed by Matvey Kazakov, or perhaps his mentor Vasili Bazhenov, for the Demidov family. It has been described as "one of the most splendid of Moscow's country estates" and as one of the "most grandiose monuments" to the southwest of Moscow.

== Background ==
The land belonged to a monastery in the 17th century. It was acquired by Tsar Peter the Great and given to his vice-chancellor Peter Shafirov, who built a six-roomed wooden house, and also a church.

The property was acquired by members of the Demidov family in the 1740s, in the middle of the reign of Tsarina Catherine II. The Demidov family grew rich from iron founding in the Urals. Nikita Akinfiyevich Demidov, grandson of the blacksmith and gun manufacturer Nikita Demidov, decided to rebuild the house.

== House ==
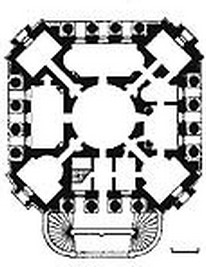
Floor plan

A new house was built in brick faced with stone in 1776–80. The main house was similar in design to the Villa Capra but with canted corners. It has an octagonal main block of two storeys, with a cupola on a round central drum above a central circular hall. The estate is situated on a hill, with the main façades facing northwest, northeast, southeast and southwest. Each of the four main façades was dominated by a loggia decorated with four giant Tuscan columns spanning both main floors, with entablature and cornice above. Each canted corner had a single-storey entrance portico with two Ionic columns and balcony above, leading to a corner room, with diagonal corridors leading to the circular central hall.

The house was surrounded at each diagonal by four identical two-storey rusticated pavilions, forming a cour d'honneur surrounded by a brick wall. The courtyard was surrounded by a landscaped park to the north, east and south. The southwestern entrance to the courtyard was decorated by two obelisks, which remain in place. A route through the park to the northeast towards the Desna River was decorated with sculptures, ending with a hill surmounted by a large statue of, originally, Catherine II and later replaced by one of Apollo, which was melted down in 1919.

The main entrance was to the northwest, leading to the church of St. Peter the Metropolitan, where the tomb of Nikita Demidov is located. The model village of Petrovskoye was laid out nearby.

== History ==
The house was later acquired by Prince Nicolas Petrovich Meshchersky in the mid-19th century, and the Meshchersky family continued to hold the property at the time of the Russian Revolution in 1917. His daughter Princess Ekaterina Nicolaievna Meshchersky wrote about her life at Petrovskoye-Alabino.

The house became a hospital after the Revolution. It suffered extensive damage in the 1930s, and there are rumours of a plan to blow up the house shortly before Russia was invaded by Nazi Germany in 1941. Metalwork was removed for scrap during the Second World War. The area was fought over in late 1941 as the Germans attempted to seize Moscow.

The building was in ruins before the beginning of the 21st century, leaving a brick shell with no internal floors or roof, and with only fragments of plaster and some limestone columns remaining. It has been given Russian Federation cultural heritage object number 5010311000. In recent years, descendants of the Meschersky family have attempted to reclaim the house.

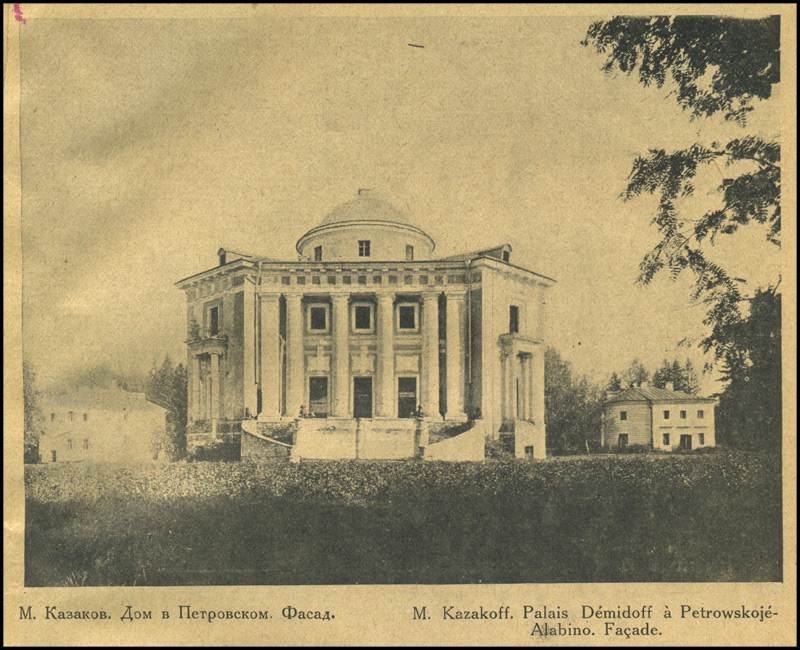
c.1930

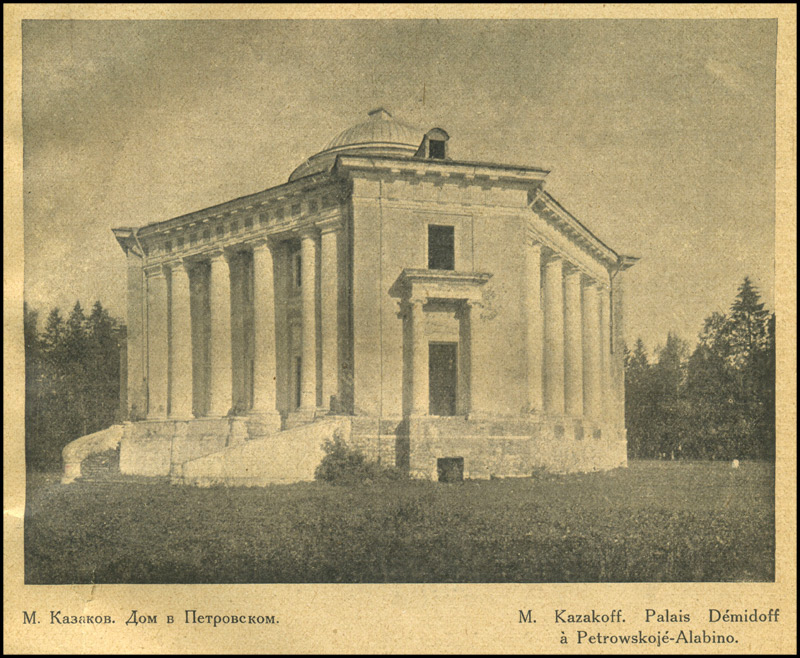
c.1930

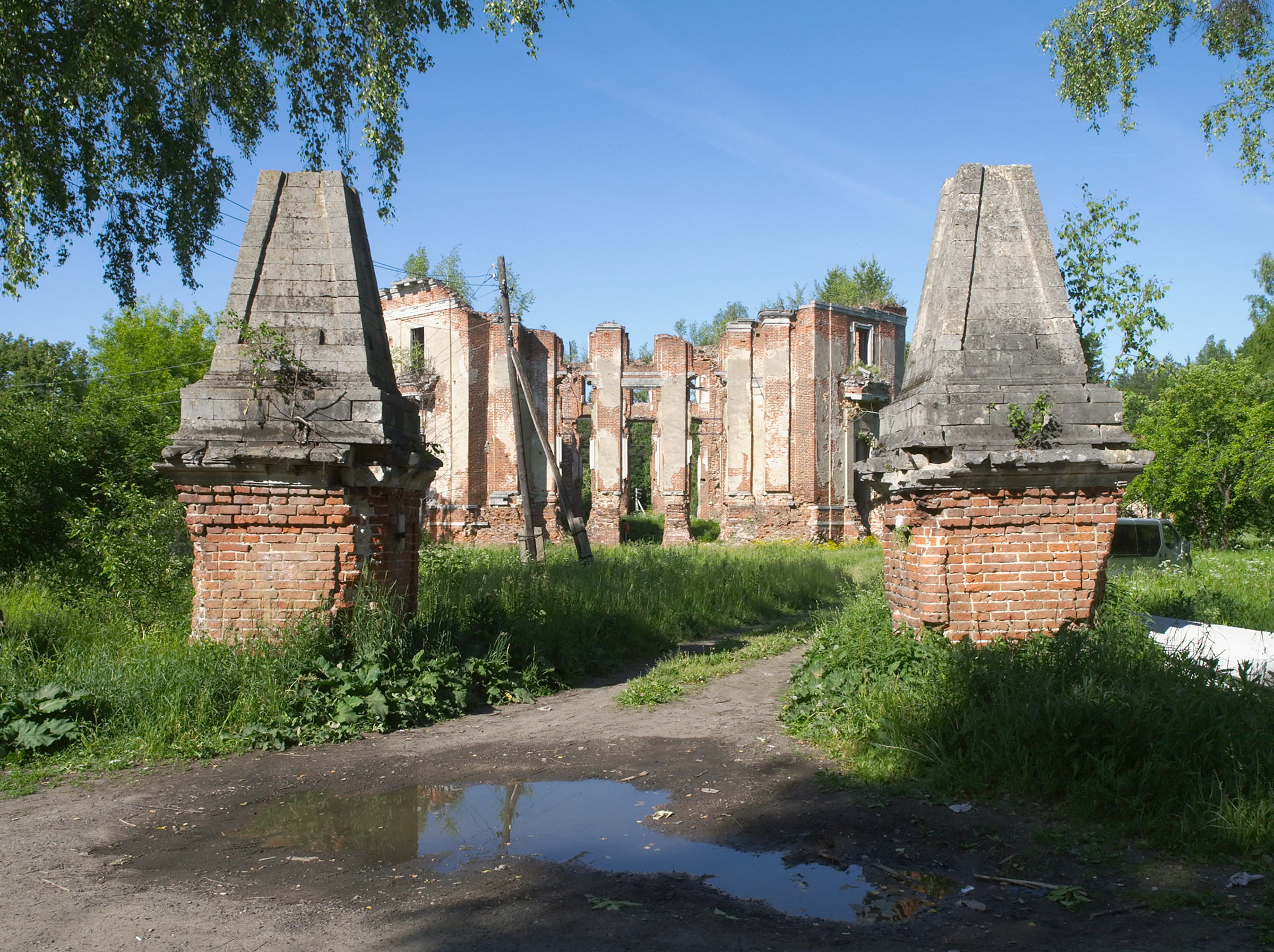
Entrance obelisks, 2011

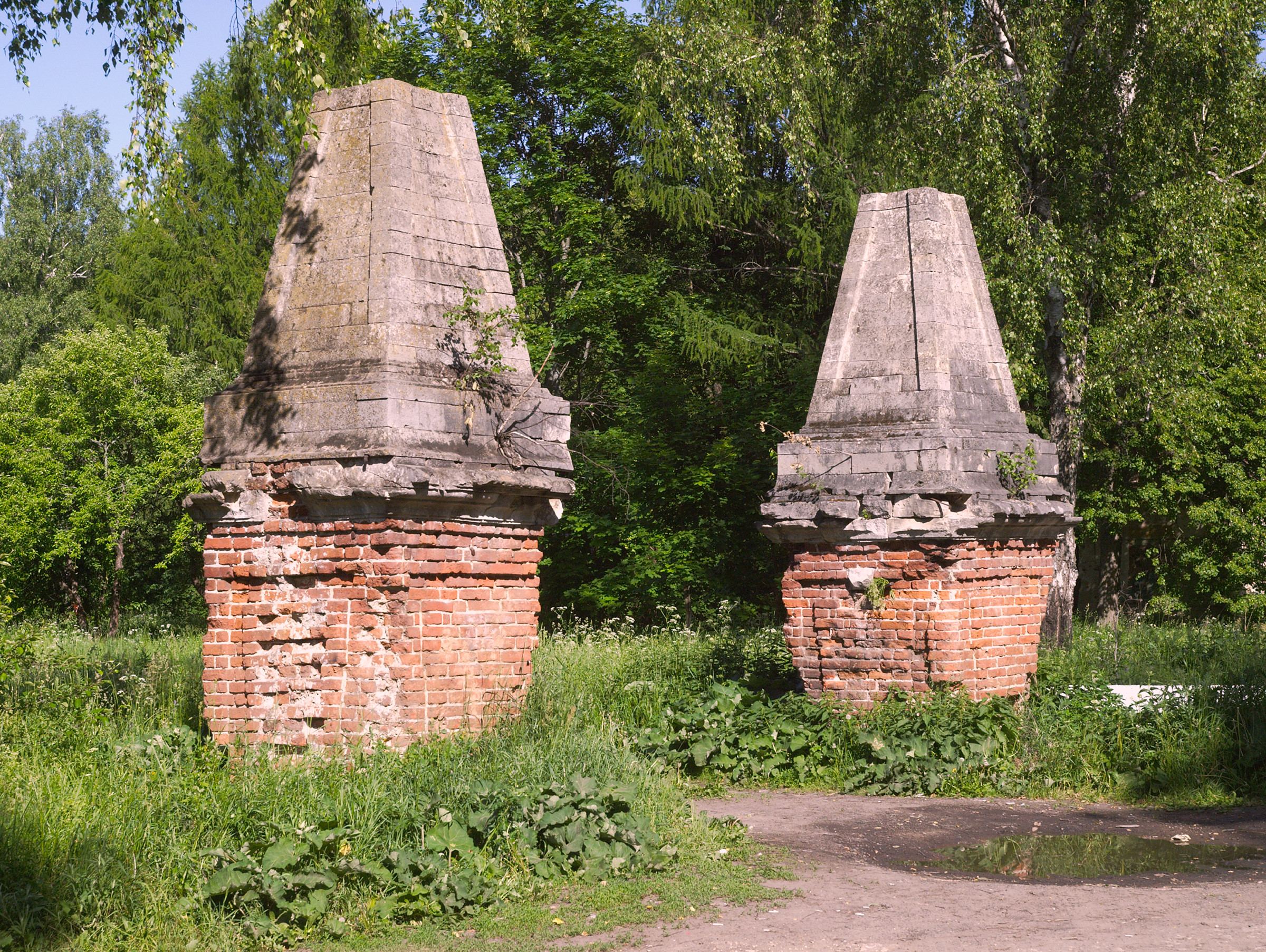
Obelisks

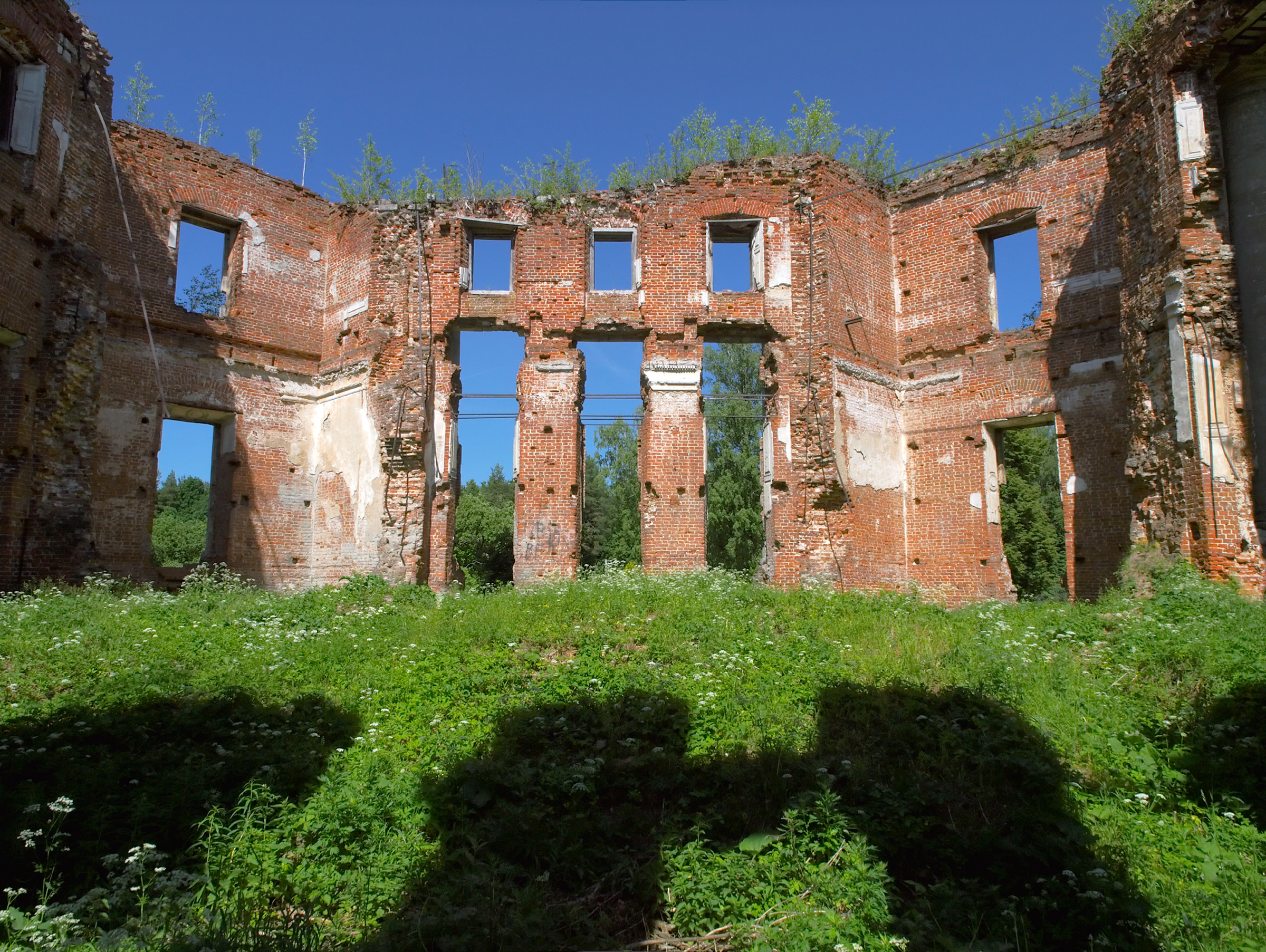
Inside

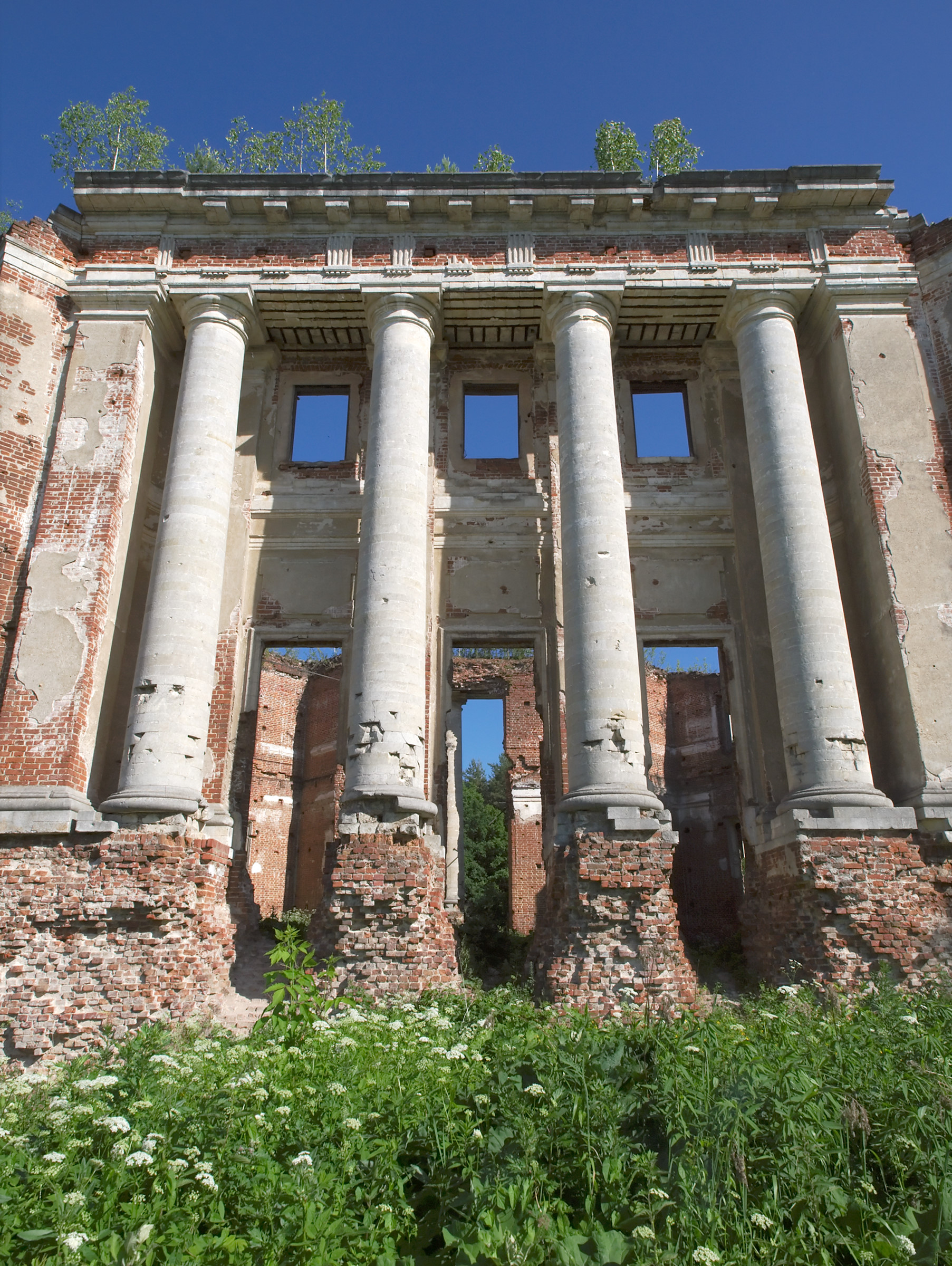
Columns of the northwest façade, 2011

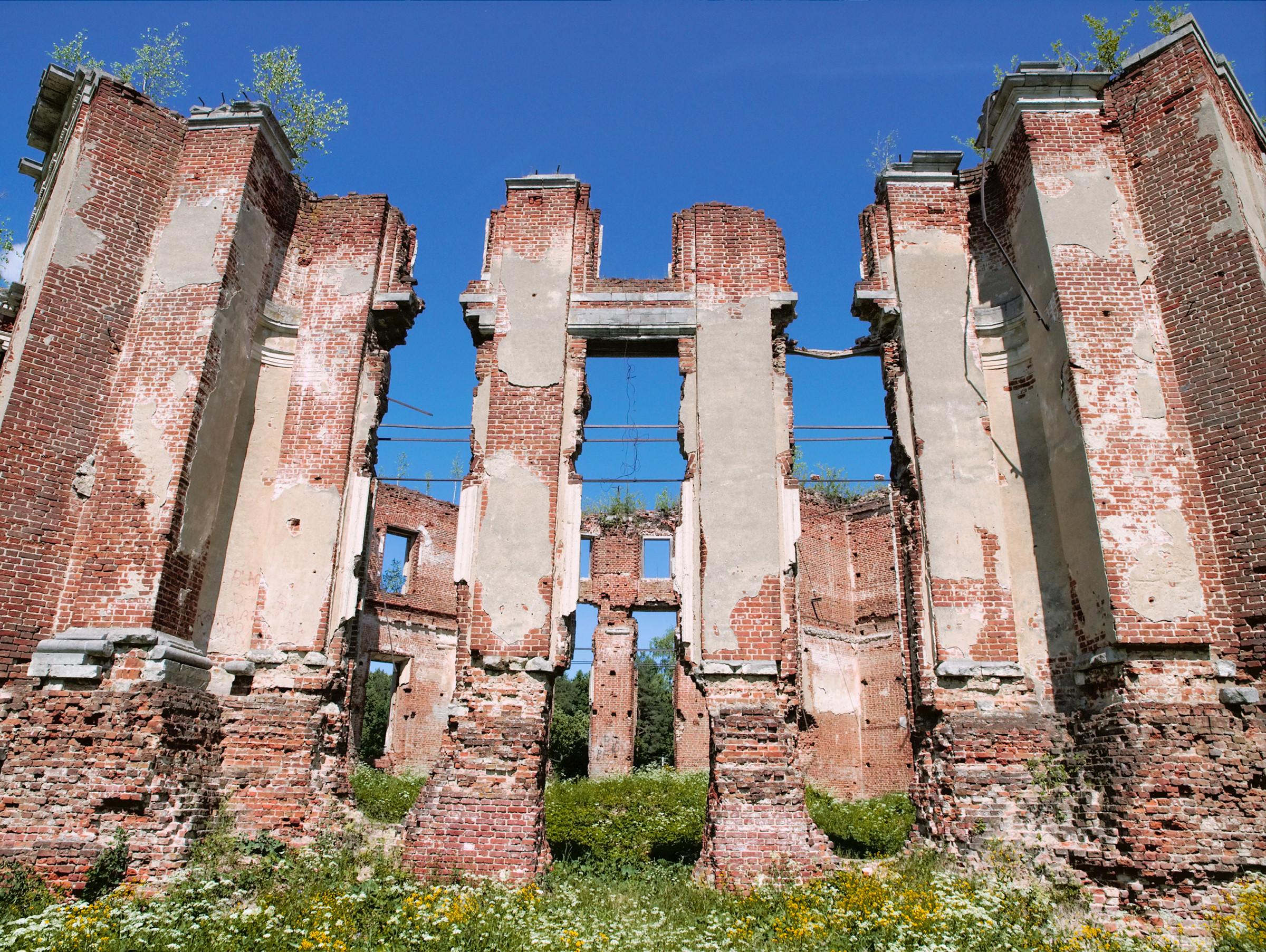
Southwest façade, 2011

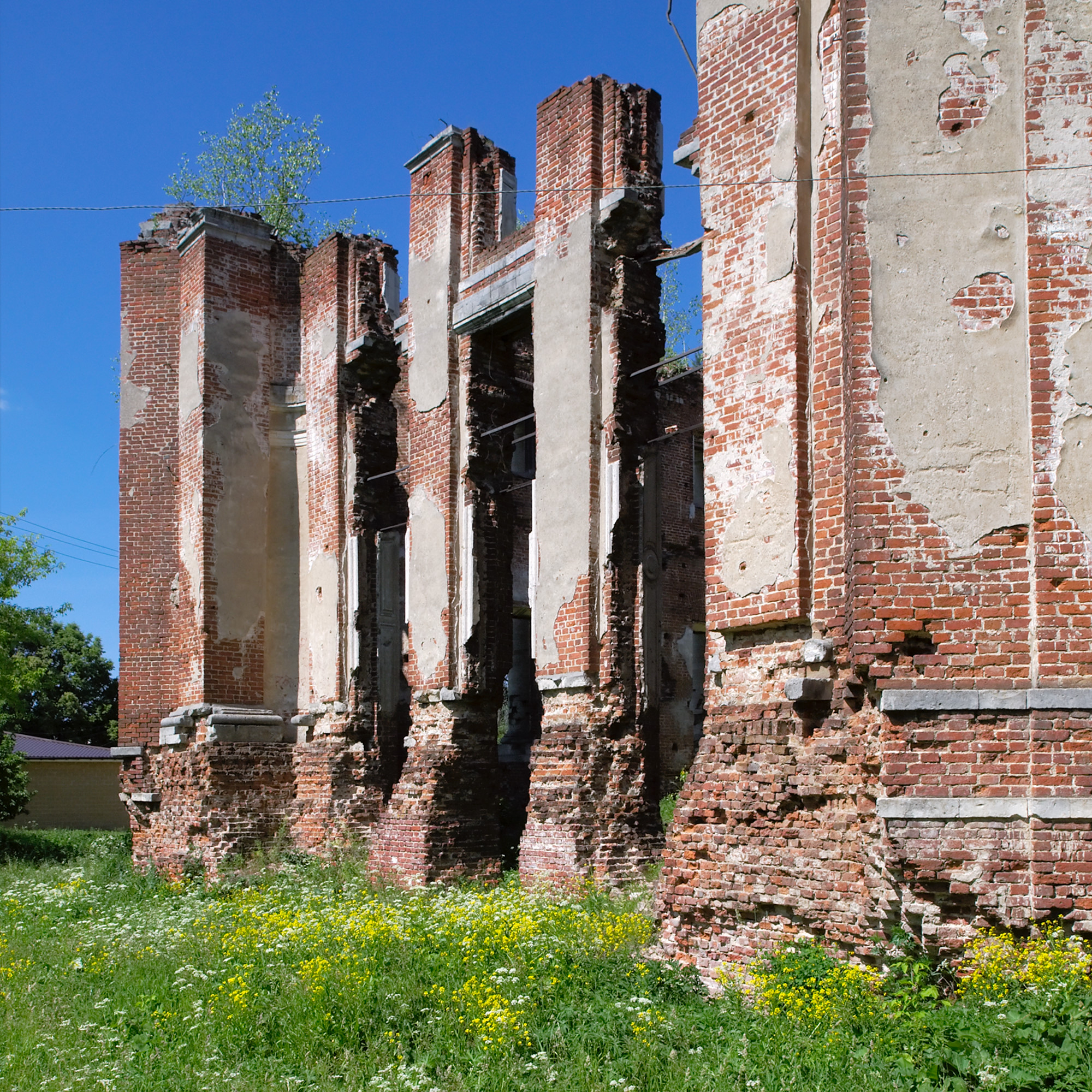
Southwest façade, 2011

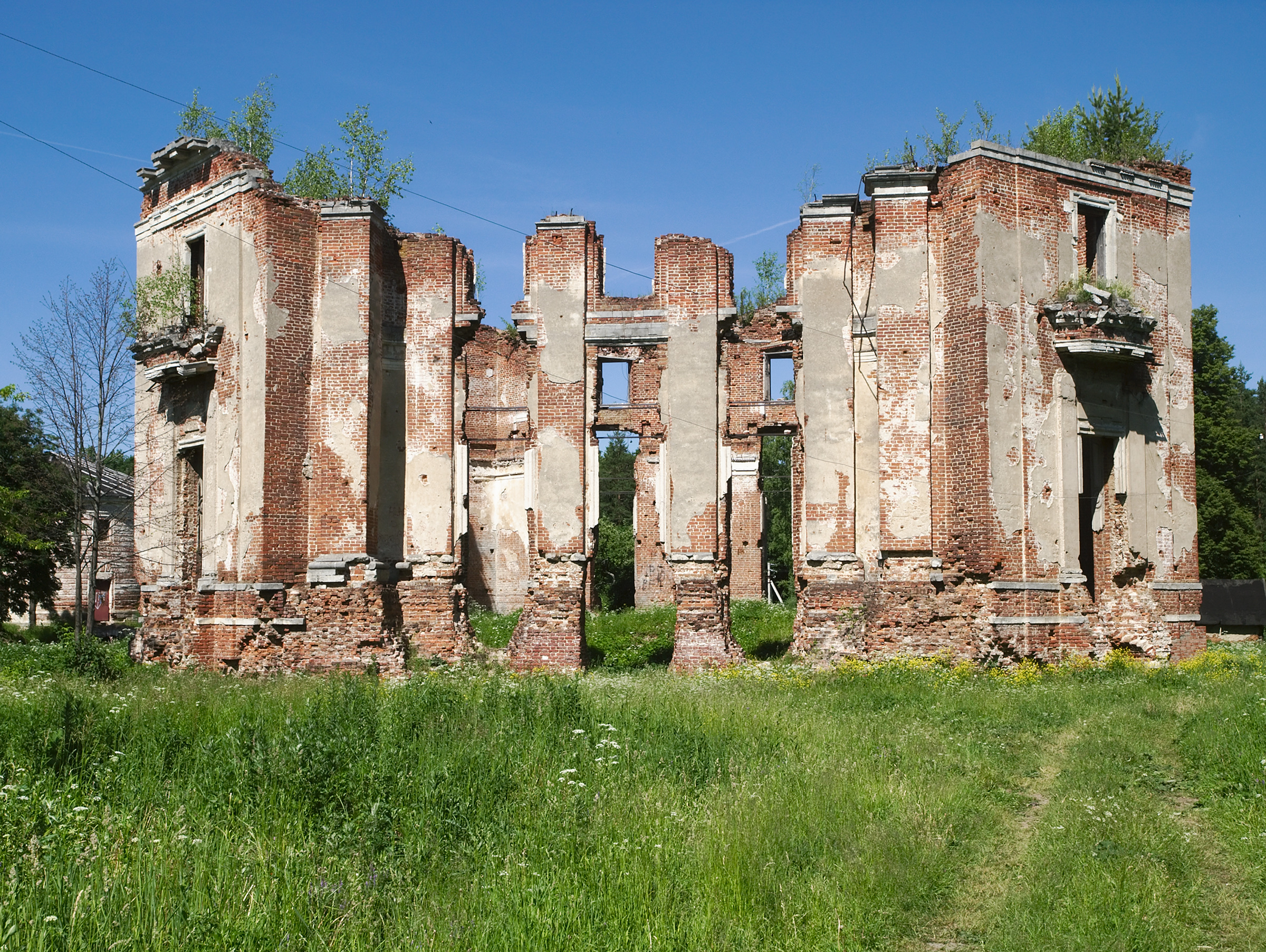
Southwest façade, 2011

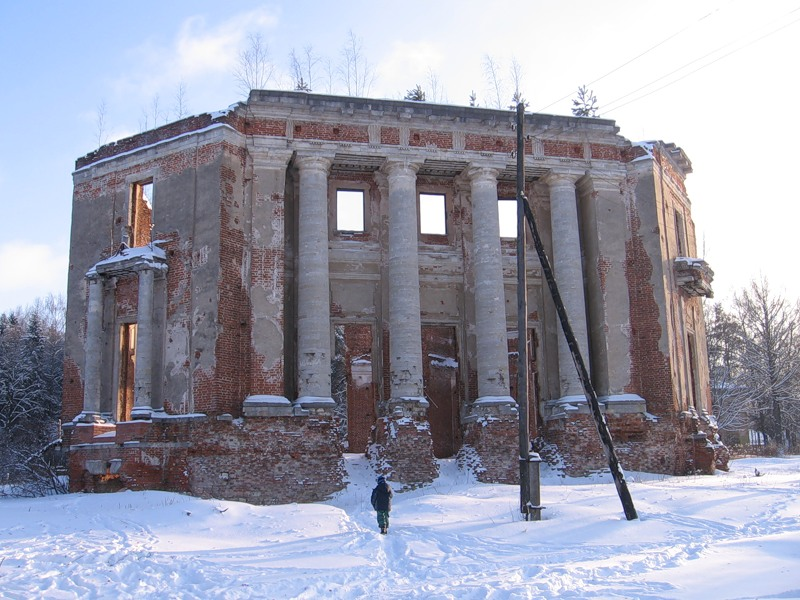
