= Meshchersky =

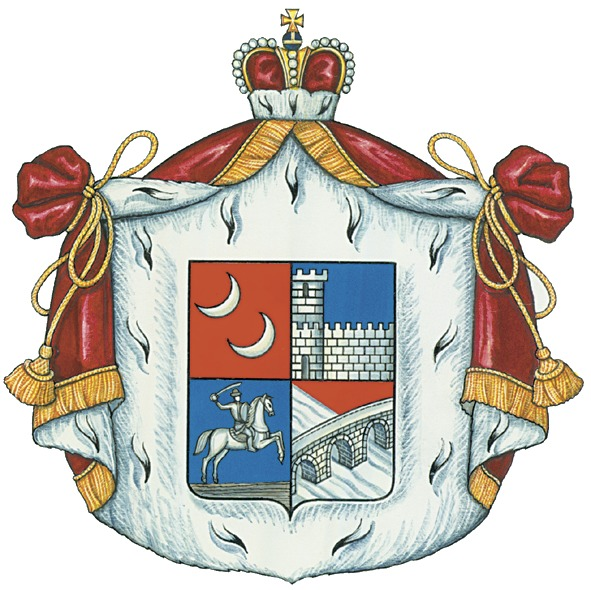
The coat of arms of the Princes Meshchersky

The House of Meshchersky (Russian: Меще́рский) is an old princely family whose title was recognized by the Russian Empire.

== Origin ==
The family descends from the medieval independent rulers of the Meshchera tribe. Their title of prince was confirmed by the Emperor Paul I of Russia on 30 June 1798.

According to the Velvet Book of the 17th century, Bakhmet Husein, the Prince of Shirin, after some disagreement in the Great Horde (according to Dmitry Ilovaysky princes of Shirin had a disagreement with Tsar of the Great Horde (Note: In 1298 the ruler of the Golden Horde was Toqta.)), moved to Volga region and later conquered the land of Meschera in 1298. He had a son by the name of Beklemish who in Andreev Gorodok (Andrew's City) was baptized as Mikhail. Mikhail later build the temple of Transfiguration and along with oneself baptised a number of people. His descendants until 1398 kept as their own the Meschera domain. A grandson of Beklemish, Yuriy Fedorovich, joined with his regiment the Great Prince of Moscow Dmitriy Donskoy at the Kulikovo Battle. In the 16–17th centuries many princes of Meschera were polk (regiment) or grad (city) voivodes.

The family was somewhat arbitrarily grouped in documentation together with Tatar princely families of the Russian Empire. The neighboring Tatar kingdom subjugated lords of the Meshchera tribe under its suzerainty, and some of them converted to Islam and bore Muslim-like first names; but soon, under Russian subjugation, subsequent generations converted to the Eastern Orthodox faith and used Slavic Christian names. The family was listed in the first part of the Registers of the Nobility of Russia, which became formalized in the 19th century or earlier.

The book Notice sur les principales familles de la Russie does not mention the Meshchersky family at all, which may be attributable to the well-established animosity towards the Meshcherskys of its author, Prince Pyotr Vladimirovich Dolgorukov.

== Estates ==
The Meshcherskys had estates particularly in Ukraine, examples of their lands being at: Pokrovskoe, Petrovskoe, Lotoshino, and the Vesholi-Podol Palace in Poltava. The estate of Petrovskoye-Alabino, near Moscow, is currently claimed by Yevgeniy Meshchersky.

== Members ==
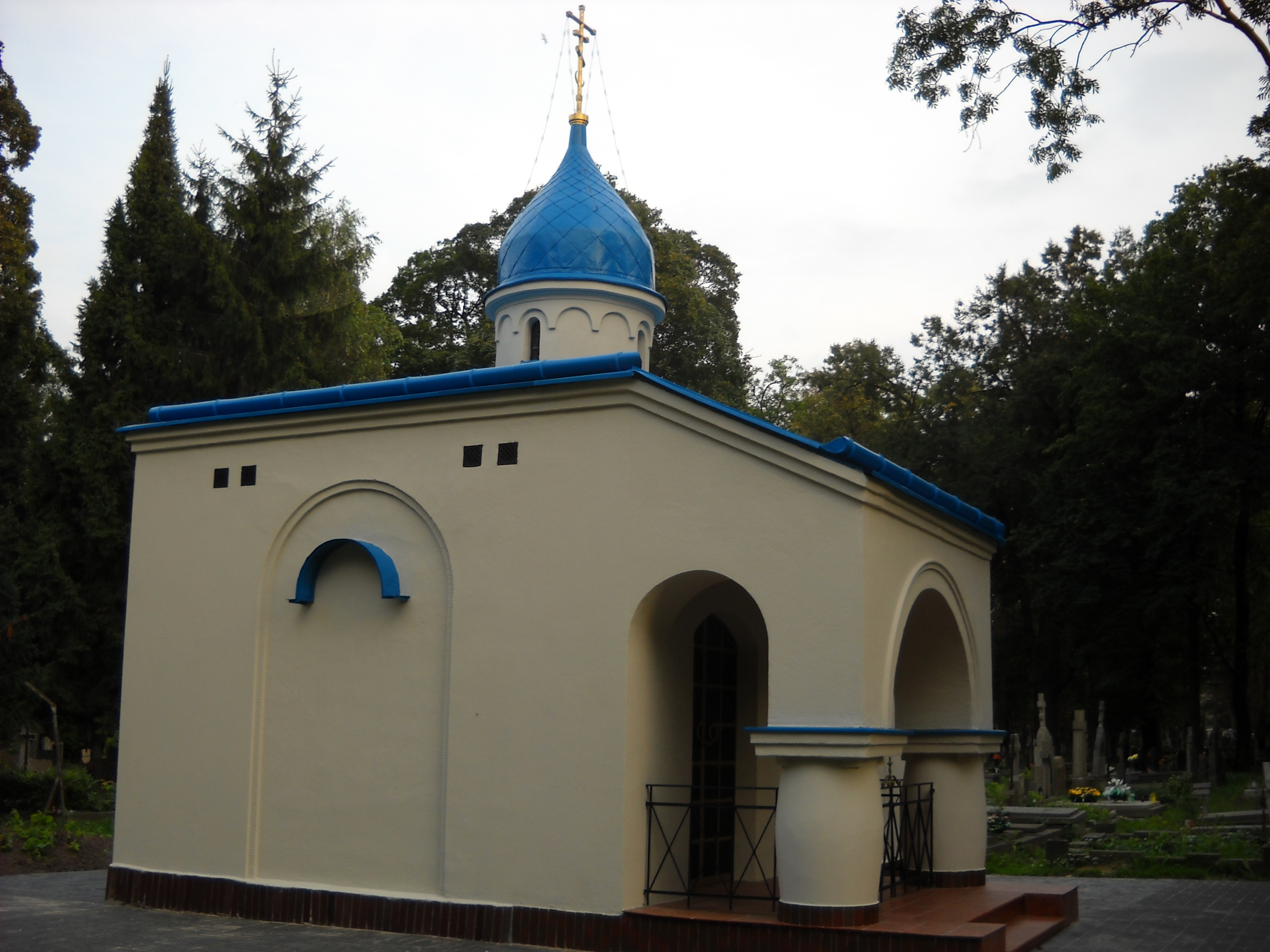
A Meshchersky family chapel and crypt in Warsaw cemetery.

Prince Ivan Sergeyevich Meshchersky (b. 11 December 1775 – d. 17 March 1851) m. to Sophia Sergeyevna Vsevolojskaya (b. 19 January 1775 – d. 4 October 1848)

- Prince Vassili Ivanovich Meshchersky (b. 1791 – d. 14 February 1871)
  - Prince Boris Vassilovich (b. 1818, d. 1884)
    - Prince Boris
    - Prince Alexis
    - Prince Serge
  - Prince Alexandre Vassilovich
  - Prince Ivan Vassilovich
  - Prince Serge Vassilovich
  - Prince Vassili Vassilovich
  - Princess Elena Vassilievna Meshcherskaya (b. St.Petersburg 14 January 1820 – d. Wartenberg 7 October 1905) m. Prince Calixt Gustav Hermann Biron von Curland (b. Schleise 3 January 1817 – d. Wartenberg 8 March 1882)
  - Prince Nicolas Vassilovich
    - Prince Serge Nicolaevich
    - Prince Ivan Nicolaevich
    - Prince Nicolas Nicolaevich
    - Prince Peter Nicolaevich
      - Prince Kirill Petrovich
      - Princess Tatjana Petrovna
- Prince Peter Ivanovich Meshchersky (b. 28 May 1802 – d. 14 April 1876) m. Ekaterina Mikhailovna Karamzina (b. 1806 – d. 1867)
  - Prince Nicolas Petrovich Meshchersky (b. 1828 – d. Dushno 11 January 1901), m. Countess Maria Alexandrovna Panina (d. Dushno 30 September 1903)
    - Princess Ekaterina Nicolaievna (b. 1855)
    - Prince Alexander Nicolaevich Meshchersky (b. 9 April 1862)
    - Princess Alexandra Nikolaievna Meshcherskaya. B. in Moscow 28 September 1864, d. in Budapest 7 July 1941. M. in Dugino 29 June 1887 to Prince Pavel Pavlovich Galitzine (b. 1856 – d. 1916).
    - Princess Maria Nicolaievna Meshcherskaya, b. 10 April 1866 at St. Petersburg, m. Count Nicolas Mikhailovitch Tolstoy and died in Asnières, France 30 October 1948.
    - Princess Sonja Nicolaievna Meshcherskaya m. Boris Wassiltchilkoff.
    - Prince Peter Nicolaevich Meshchersky (b. Moscow 24 May 1869 – d. Paris 17 November 1944), m. Vera von Struve (b. Tokyo 4 February 1876 – d. Sainte-Geneviève-des-Bois 17 December 1949), daughter of Karl von Struve
      - Prince Nicolas Petrovich Meshchersky (b St. Petersburg 21 November 1905 – d. Versailles 18 July 1966), m. Berlin 12 January 1948 to Yvonne Claire Marie Amélie Leroux (b. Les Mureaux 7 June 1911 – d. Louveciennes 9 August 2004)
        - Prince Piotr Nicolaevich Meshchersky (b. Paris 4 June 1948) m. Saint-Michel-en-Brenne 8 June 1973 to Caroline Marie Paule Sophie Lebaudy (b. Neuilly-sur-Seine 9 June 1950)
          - Prince Nikolai Alexander Maria Petrovich Meshchersky (b. Neuilly-sur-Seine 8 February 1976) m. to Laurie Callier
          - Prince Kirill Petrovich Meshchersky (b. Paris 31 March 1977)
          - Princess Sophie Petrovna Meshscherskaya (b. Paris 10 January 1980)
      - Prince Kyrill Petrovich Meshchersky (b. St. Petersburg 1907 – d. 1947), m. in Paris 1944 to Maria Januaria Baffa
      - Prince Nikita Petrovich Meshchersky (b. St. Petersburg 1909 – d. 1942) m. Antoinette de Guéhéneuc de Boishüe (b. Laval 28 November 1908 – d. Sainte-Geneviève-des-Bois 31 December 2008)
      - Princess Marina Petrovna Meshcherskaya (b. St. Petersburg 1913) m. (1) Count Michael Vorontsov-Dashkoff (b. 9 July 1904 – d. 14 March 1983) (2) Count Ivan Schuvaloff
    - Princess Natasha Nicolaievna Meshcherskaya (b. 1877 – d. 1944) m. in Nice 16 April 1903 to Count Pavel Ignatieff (b. 1870 – d. 1945)
  - Prince Vladimir Petrovich (b. 11 January 1839 – d. 23 July 1914)

Prince Petr Sergeyevich Meshchersky (b. 1778 – d. 1857) m. to Ekaterina Ivanova Chernysheva

- Prince Elim Petrovich Meshchersky (b. 1808 – d. 1844)
  - Princess Maria Elimovna Meshcherskaya (b. 1844 – d. 1868) m. to Pavel Pavlovich Demidov, 2nd Prince of San Donato
