= Elim Meshchersky =

Russian diplomat and writer (1808–1844)

Elim Petrovich Meshchersky
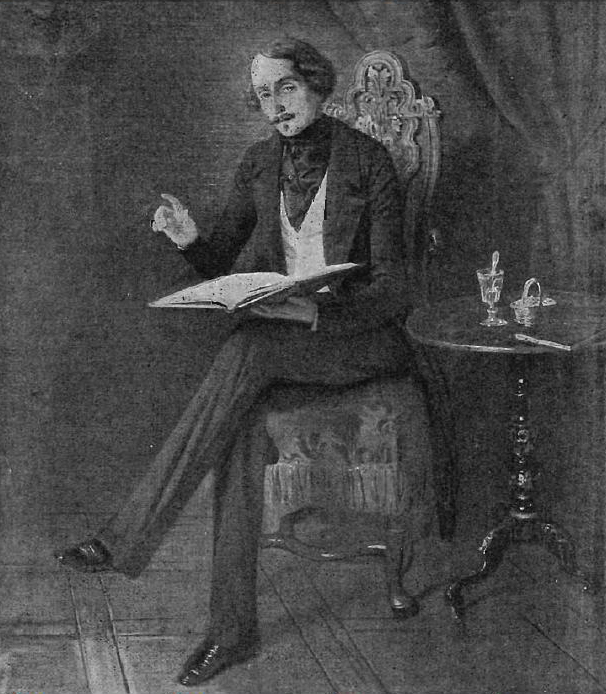
- Born: 26 October 1808; Saint Petersburg, Russia
- Died: 2 October 1844 (aged 35); Paris, France
- Spouse: Varvara Stepanovna Zhikhareva
- Issue: Maria Meshcherskaya
- Father: Pyotr Sergeevich Meshchersky
- Mother: Ekaterina Ivanovna Chernysheva
- Occupation: Poet; diplomat; translator

Prince Elim Petrovich Meshchersky (Russian: Эли́м Петро́вич Меще́рский; 26 October 1808 – 2 October 1844) was a Russian diplomat, poet, who wrote mainly in French. He was engaged in the translation of Russian literature into French. He compiled the posthumously published anthology Les poètes russes ("Russian poets", Paris, 1846). His daughter, Mariya Meshcherskaya, became the lover of the future Alexander III, before his marriage.

== Biography ==
Prince Elim Meshchersky was born on 26 October 1808 in Saint Petersburg in the Meshchersky family. His father was Prince Pyotr Sergeyevich Meshchersky (1779–1856), privy councilor, chief prosecutor of the Holy Synod, chairman of the Bible Society. His mother, Ekaterina Ivanovna, née Chernysheva (1782–1851), was the sister of Alexander Chernyshyov, a participant in the wars with Napoleon, who later under Nicholas I of Russia became Minister of War and Chairman of the State Council.

Elim was baptized on 14 November 1808 in the Church of the Dormition of the Most Holy Theotokos on Sennaya Square, with the acceptance of Prince I. S. Meshchersky and grandmother Evdokia Dmitrievna Chernysheva.

Due to illness, he received his education at home. He spent his childhood in Weimar, Germany, with his mother, where he was introduced to Johann Wolfgang von Goethe and kept in touch with him all his life. Despite the fact that he did not live with his father, Elim Meshchersky never broke ties with him. Pyotr Sergeevich had a great influence on the formation of his son's worldview, on his political views, and in his correspondence, Elim Meshchersky often shared observations about the formation of his character and his views on life.

When Meshchersky was 18 years old, the Russian ambassador to Dresden Vasily Khanykov, wishing to please his mother, petitioned for the young man to receive one of the oldest Saxon orders - the Ancestral Order of Vigilance, or the White Falcon, which was awarded by the Duke of Weimar.

Meshchersky returned to Russia as an adult with views formed under the influence of German philosophy. After graduating from Saint Petersburg University in 1823, Meshchersky served in the department of the Ministry of Foreign Affairs in Dresden, then at the Russian mission in Turin, then – attaché of the Russian embassy in Paris. At this time, Meshchersky had the court rank of chamber-cadet and the civil rank of titular adviser.

The diplomatic service did not interest him so when Sergey Uvarov, Minister of Public Education of the Russian Empire, was looking for a person who could keep him informed about "all the most remarkable things that happen in the field of sciences and arts, in particular, in the course measures taken by the French government in relation to educational institutions", Meshchersky in 1833, took the position of "personal correspondent of the minister."

In 1836, the functions of "literary correspondent" were transferred to Yakov Tolstoy, who was better suited to the position. Meshchersky continued to be nominally on the staff of the Russian embassy in Paris, and then was assigned to the mission in Turin, still living in Paris. Both he and his mother, Ekaterina Ivanovna née Chernysheva, who had separated from his father, moved to Paris. Her literary salon was visited by many famous French writers and publicists, among them Honoré de Balzac, Charles Augustin Sainte-Beuve, Alfred de Musset, Alfred de Vigny, Alexandre Dumas, Victor Hugo, and others. Meshchersky himself arranged poetry readings.

In June 1836, Meshchersky went on vacation to Saint Petersburg. Here he first met with Alexander Pushkin, who presented him with Boris Godunov, inscribed with Meshchersky's name. This indicates that Meshchersky came to the liking of the poet. In Pushkin's library there is a book by Antoni Deschamp "Dérnières paroles" (Paris, 1835), donated by the author to Meshchersky (with an autograph). Pushkin knew Meshchersky's fiancée, Varvara Zhikhareva, as he was close with her parents.

In 1839, Meshchersky married Varvara Stepanovna Zhikhareva (1819—1879), whom he had courted since 1831. She was the daughter of the writer S. P. Zhikharev. Varvara came from an old noble family that was not rich, so the marriage was not approved by the Prince's mother. In her youth, Varvara Stepanovna was known in Moscow society for her "captivating" beauty, and later for her love affairs.

Meshchersky died at the age of thirty-five from dropsy, with the rank of Court councillor and the rank of chamberlain. His daughter Maria, was not yet a year old. The poet was buried in Tsarskoye Selo at the Kazan cemetery. His widow later married to Count Borbon del Monte.

== Personal views ==
Meshchersky shared the ideology of the French Catholic philosophers of the Restoration era, such as the conservative Count Joseph-Marie de Maistre and the traditionalist Viscount Louis de Bonald.

He met with the philosopher and zealous Christian, Louis Eugène Marie Bautain, to whom he confided his thoughts on the unity of the universal Church.

Meshchersky was sympathetic to Freemasonry. In Paris, he helped the Russian court acquire documents related to the history of Freemasonry. Meshchersky set out his views in the compilation treatise De la foi dans la science ("On Faith and Science"), which affirmed the idea of the moral strength of the Russian people, not spoiled by rationalism, capable of becoming the center of the Christian revival of Europe, serving the unification of East and West (see East–West Schism), which Meschersky believed had caused spiritual, religious and political decline.

Meshchersky's views on the future of the Russian Empire were complementary to the thoughts of his boss about the greatness of Russia, its messiahship, and with the conviction that the reign of Nicholas was the beginning of the “Russian era” of Europe.

== Notable works ==
An ardent patriot, he wanted to give the French a true view of Russia by fostering cultural ties between the two countries.

His work in this direction began as early as 1830 with a speech On Russian Literature at the Atteneum Society in Marseille.

In the speech first expressed the idea that the French influence on Russian literature had been overcome, with Russia developing a distinct style of literature.

Meshchersky also owned the anonymously published book Lettres d'un russe adressées à MM les rédacteurs de la Revue Européenne, ci devant du Correspondant, which spoke a lot about Pushkin and was discussed in Saint Petersburg circles and gained popularity. Vyazemsky spoke about this work of Meshchersky in a letter to his wife:

"Worst of all, the brochure is very stupid. There is a lot of… servile patriotism in my feelings". -"Encounters with the past." T.5. Soviet Russia, 1984

Subsequently, continuing to acquaint the French public with Russian literature, Meshchersky published the articles On Russian satire in various epochs of the development of Russian society and Poetry of the Cossacks (1834).

To improve the image of the Russian Empire, he began to cooperate with many French metropolitan publications (such, Le Panorama Littéraire de l'Europe). There Meshchersky publishes two articles. One is dedicated to Russian satire, the other to folk poetry.

In the magazine Revue européen par les rédacteurs du Correspondent, his article appeared, the author of which was listed as Un russe des vous abonnés ("Your Russian subscriber").

He asks literary critics in personal correspondence "to show sympathy or at least impartiality towards Russia".

The Journal général de l'introduction publiqué et des cours scientifique et littéraire published an article On Education in the Russian Empire, claiming that the Russian government had spies in universities watching students and teachers. Meshchersky brought several issues of the Journal of the Ministry of Public Education to the editorial office to show what the Russian government is concerned about the education of its subjects. Owing to the influence of Meshchersky, the attitude of this newspaper towards Russia changed.

At the same time, he published his notes on primary education in France, on French writers and philosophers – Alphonse de Lamartine, Arnie Lacordin, a review of one issue of the magazine Panorama littéraire de l'Europe, notes on morality in Christianity, on the French Catholic University, and progressive religiosity in France.

== Legacy ==
After resigning from the post of attaché, the prince devoted himself entirely to literary activity. Three collections of his translations have been published.

His artistic legacy remained mainly in French. Before Meshchersky, an ordinary French reader was not familiar with Russian literature or culture.

Unlike his predecessors, Meshchersky was fluent in both languages. His poems were appreciated by contemporary Parisian writers. The only collection of poems and translations published during the life of the author was published in 1839 and was named "Les Boréales" - "Northern Poems". The collection contains twenty-five of his translations of poems by Alexander Pushkin, Vasily Zhukovsky, Yevgeny Baratynsky, and Aleksey Koltsov.

After his death in 1845, through the efforts of his mother and friends, led by Émile Deschamps, a book of lyrics in French Les roses noires ("Black roses") was published.

The last book of Meshchersky, a two-volume anthology Les poétes russes ("Russian poets") was published in 1846. It included translations of 55 Russian poets of the late 18th and early 19th centuries. Meshchersky wanted to show the French reader the abundance and diversity of Russian poetry, therefore, along with the classics of the golden age of Russian poetry, less famous works were included in the anthology.

It should be mentioned that in different years he published several poems in Russian - in Nestor Kukolnik's collection Novogodnik and in the anthology Morning Dawn by Vladimir Andreevich Vladislavlev.

Vasily Kuleshov notes that, in contrast to Parisian materialism, Meshchersky tried to acquaint the French with Russian literature from a monarchical position. Meshchersky faced criticism of Russian policies, met with contempt. He even wanted to establish a special magazine in liberal Paris that would spread "correct information" about Russia. But funds for this were not allocated from the treasury and the idea of the magazine was not implemented.

Elim Meshchersky introduced Russian poetry to the French and German reading public. He brought Russian poetry to French writers not only through the publication of his translations, but also personally incessantly communicating with them in literary salons.

In Russia, Pushkin and Pyotr Vyazemsky appreciated his work. In France, Meshchersky's work was largely forgotten until his works were revived by Andre Mazon at the beginning of the 20th century.

== Sources ==
- "Мещерский, Елим Петрович" . Brockhaus and Efron Encyclopedic Dictionary (in Russian). 1906.
