= Prince Alexander Romanov =

Russian prince (1929–2002)

Prince Alexander Nikitich
- Born: 4 November 1929; Paris, France
- Died: 22 September 2002 (aged 72); London, England
- Spouse: Princess Maria Immacolata Valguarnera (m. 1971)
Names
- Alexander Nikitich Romanov
- House: Holstein-Gottorp-Romanov
- Father: Prince Nikita Alexandrovich of Russia
- Mother: Countess Maria Vorontsova-Dashkova

Prince Alexander Nikitich Romanov (4 November 1929 – 22 September 2002) was a member of the Romanov family. He was a son of Prince Nikita Alexandrovich of Russia and a great nephew of Nicholas II of Russia, the last Tsar.

Born in France, he took British citizenship in 1938 and lived with his grand mother Grand Duchess Xenia Alexandrovna in England until her death in 1960. The following year, Prince Alexander Nikitich became the first member of the Romanov family to visit Russia after the Revolution.

== Life ==
He was born in Paris, the youngest son Prince Nikita Alexandrovich of Russia and his wife Countess Mariya Ilarianovna Vorontzova-Daschkova. Prince Alexander was a grandson of Grand Duchess Xenia Alexandrovna and Grand Duke Alexander Mikhailovich of Russia and a great nephew of the last Russian Emperor, Nicholas II. He spent the early years of his life in the United Kingdom and received British nationality in 1938. By age 14 he was fluent in five languages. He was interested in geography, history, philosophy.

At the outbreak of the Second World War Prince Alexander and his family were in France and unable to return to the United Kingdom so he was taken to Rome first and then on to Czechoslovakia which resulted in the family almost being repatriated to Russia. Following the conclusion of the war he returned to Britain before moving onto the United States to study at Columbia University. He returned to Britain in 1953 and stayed with his grandmother Grand Duchess Xenia at Hampton Court. He helped to raise funds for a new Orthodox church, after the old temple near Buckingham Palace was destroyed. After the death of his grandmother in 1960, Alexander Nikitich moved to New York, where he worked as translator for a publishing house, worked in advertising, as well as doing historical and genealogical research.

On 27 May 1961, he became the first descendant of the Imperial Family to return to Russia after its members went into exile or were murdered by the Communists following the October Revolution, when he managed to get a visa to join a group of tourists. During his stay he visited Moscow, St Petersburg (although at the time the city was called Leningrad) the former capital of the Russian Empire and the estate of the Princes Yusupov in Arkhangelskoye, near Moscow.

Prince Alexander married a Sicilian princess, Maria 'Mimi' Valguarnera (29 November 1931, Palermo, Italy - 29 September 2023, New York City), daughter of Corrado, Prince of Niscemi and Castelnuovo and Duke of Arenella, on 23 February 1971 in New York City in a civil ceremony, and in a religious ceremony on 18 July 1971 in Cannes. His wife converted to Orthodox Christianity before their marriage. The couple lived in New York City and in London. They had no children.

In 1979, Prince Alexander Nikitich became a member of the Romanov family association. In 1992, he participated in the meeting of the seven princes of the Romanov family in Paris.

Prince Alexander Nikitich Romanov died after a brief illness, 21 September 2002 in London. His body was cremated at Mortlake Crematorium and buried in the ancestral tomb of his wife's family in Palermo.

== Ancestry ==
Ancestors of Prince Alexander Romanov

8. Grand Duke Michael Nikolaevich of Russia
4. Grand Duke Alexander Mikhailovich of Russia
9. Princess Cecilie of Baden
2. Prince Nikita Alexandrovich of Russia
10. Alexander III of Russia
5. Grand Duchess Xenia Alexandrovna of Russia
11. Dagmar of Denmark
1. Prince Alexander Nikitich Romanov
12. Count Illarion Ivanovich Vorontsov-Dashkov
6. Count Illarion Illarionovich Vorontsov-Dashkov
13. Countess Elisaveta Andreevna Schouvaloff
3. Countess Maria Illarionovna Vorontsova-Dashkova
14. Vassili Lvovich Narychkine
7. Irene Vassilievna Narychkine
15. Princess Fevronia Pavlovna Djambakouriane-Orbeliani
