= Alabino =

Alabino Алабино
- Village
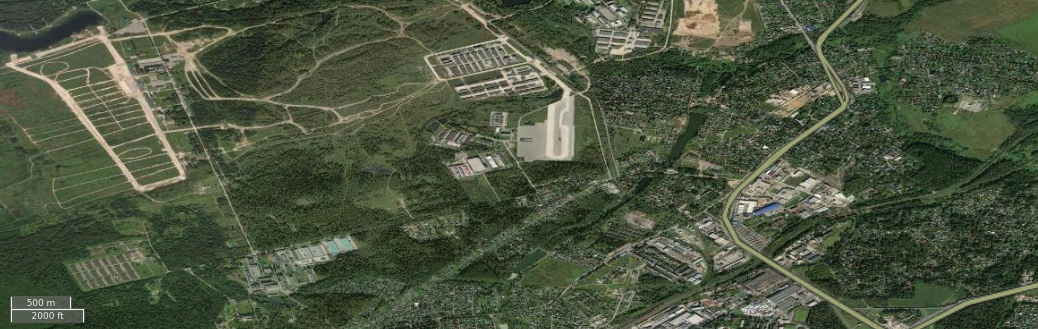
- Satellite imagery of Alabino east of its proving ground

- Location within Moscow Location within Russia
- Coordinates: 55°31′30″N 37°00′05″E
- Country: Russia
- Region: Moscow Oblast
- District: Naro-Fominsky District
- Municipality: Selyatino

Population (2010)
  - Total: 651
- Time zone: UTC+3:00 (MSK)
- Postal code: 143395

Alabino (Russian: Алабино) is a rural locality in the Moscow Oblast of Russia. With a population of over 600 people, it is part of the urban settlement of Selyatino. Until 2006, Alabino was part of the Petrovsky Rural District.

One of the main attractions in the town is the Petrovskoye-Alabino, a ruined country house which was considered to be "one of the most splendid of Moscow's country estates". The village's main form of transport has been provided since the early 20th century by the Kiyevsky suburban railway line which stops in the village to pick citizens at the train station.

== Alabino Proving Ground ==
The town hosts a proving ground of the Russian Ground Forces, utilizing it during rehearsals in late March towards 17–18 April every year for the Moscow Victory Day Parade, where in the parade is being tuned up for the main performance on Victory Day (9 May). On jubilee years, many foreign contingents from countries such as Moldova, China, India and Kazakhstan have stayed at a lodging in the proving ground. The training field is also a site of many training exercises involving the Ground Forces.

== Gallery ==
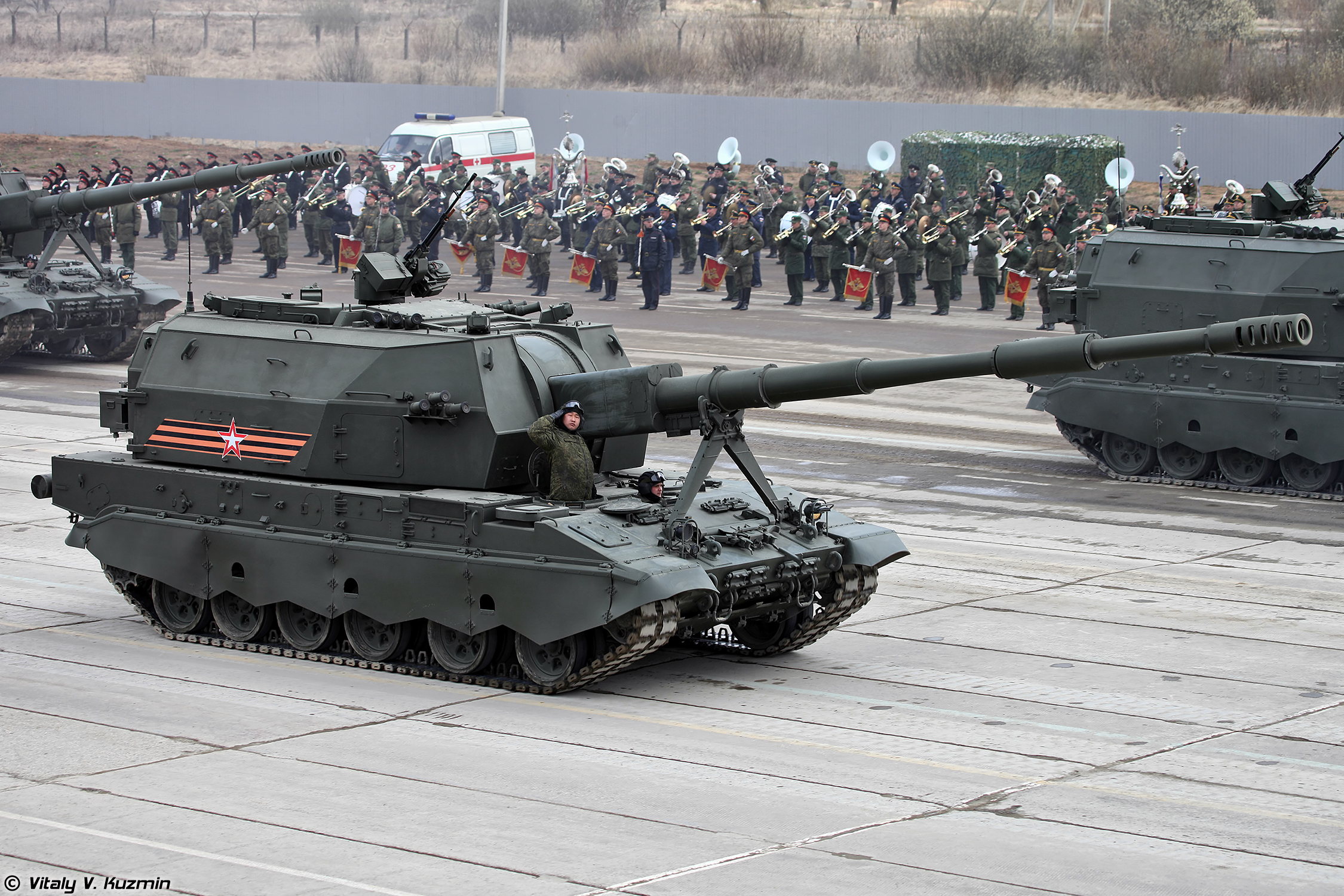
Self-propelled artillery during a rehearsal in Alabino

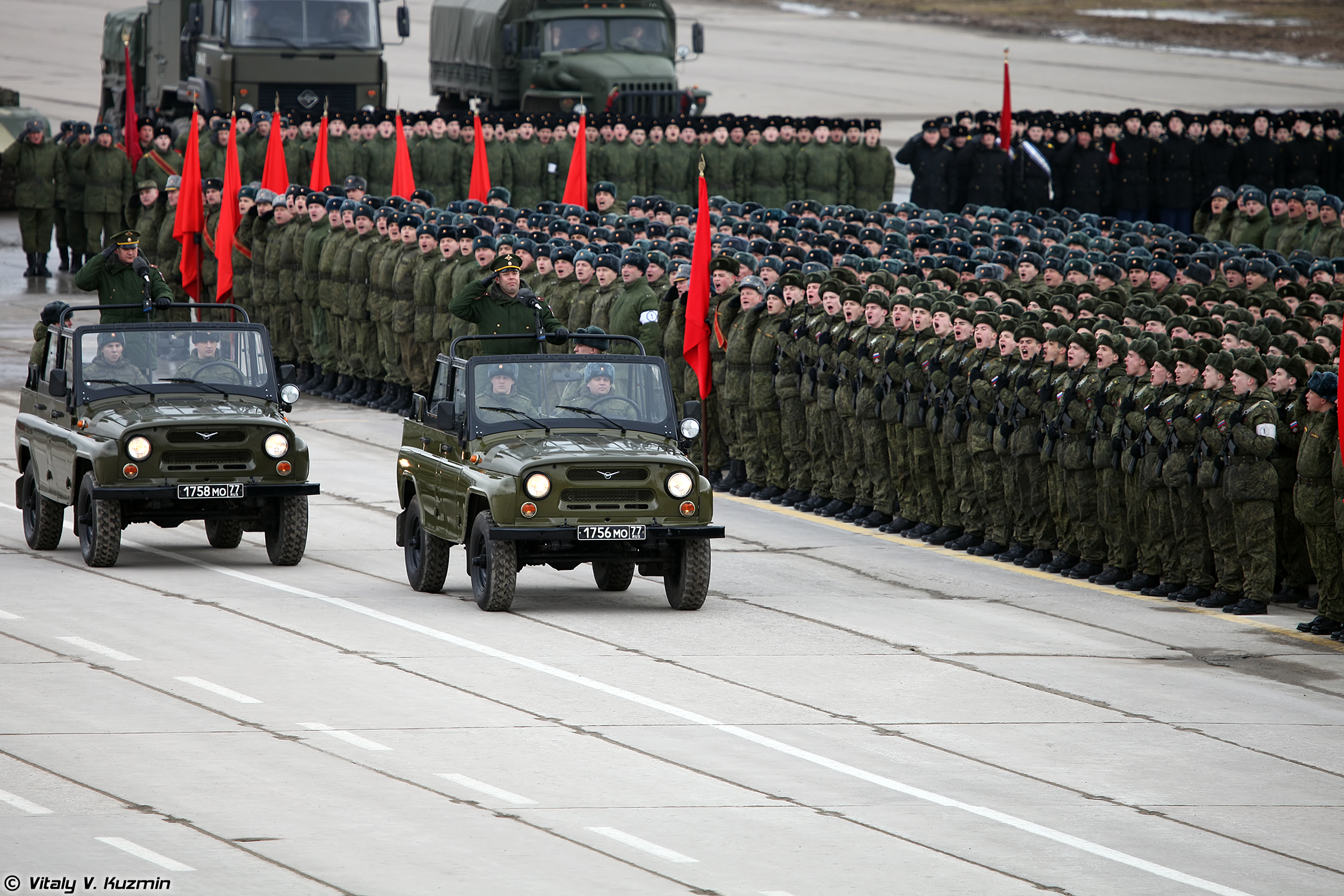
Senior officers of the armed forces inspect the Moscow Garrison in Alabino.

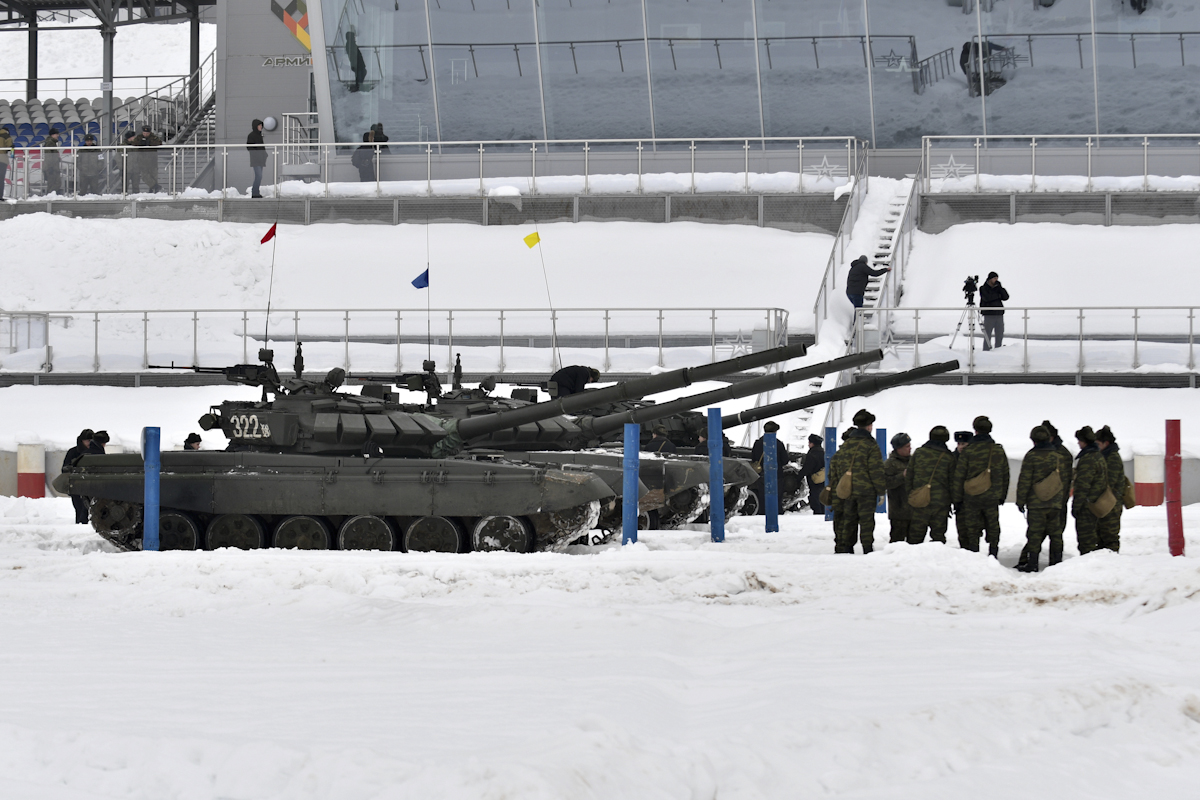
A vehicle of the 2nd Guards Motorized Rifle Division at a tank biathlon in Alabino.

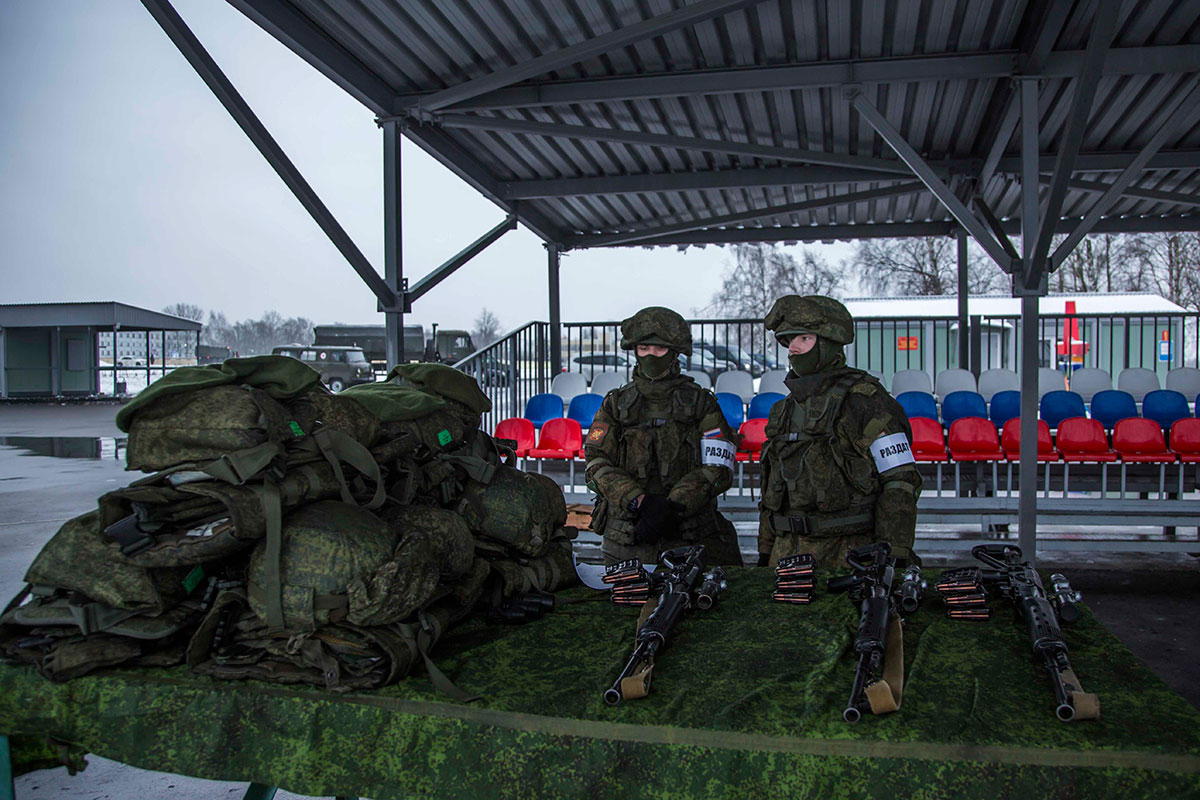
Russian Special Operations Forces meeting with officers of the Russian Ground Forces at the training ground in Alabino, 21 December 2017

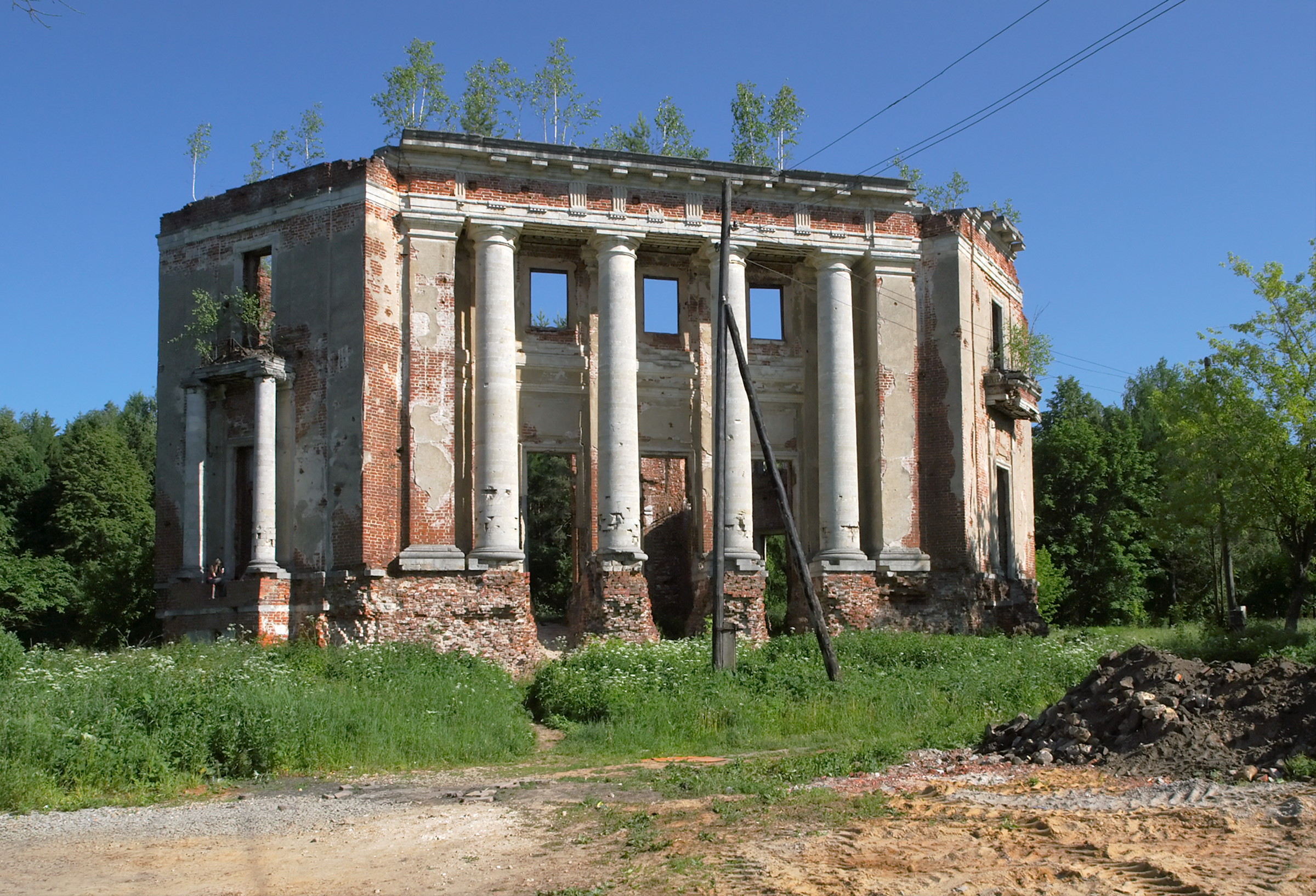
The northwest facade of Petrovskoye-Alabino, 2011.

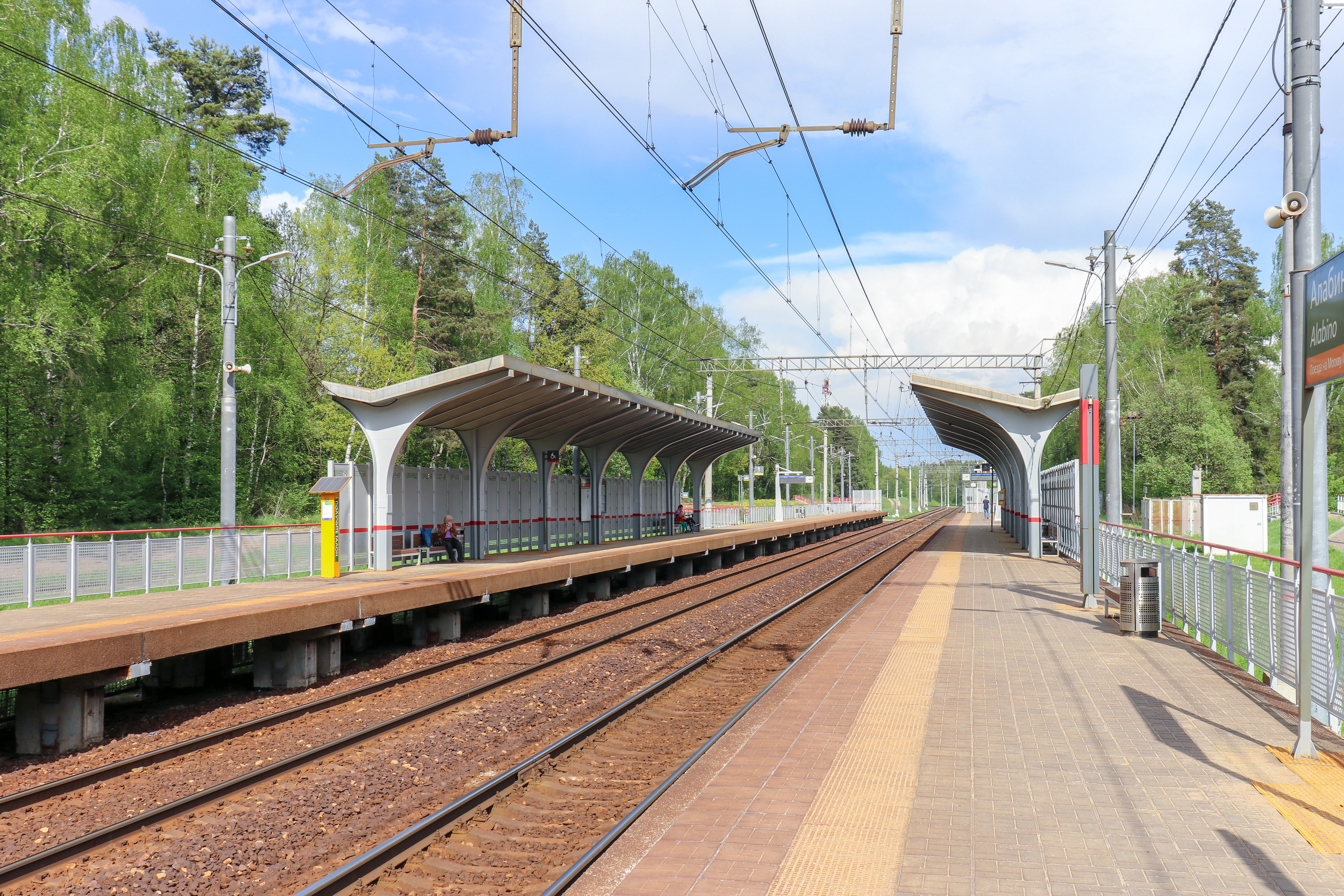
The Kiyevsky suburban railway line in Alabino
