= Prince Nikita Alexandrovich of Russia =

Russian prince (1900–1974)

Nikita Alexandrovich Romanoff
- Prince of the Imperial Blood
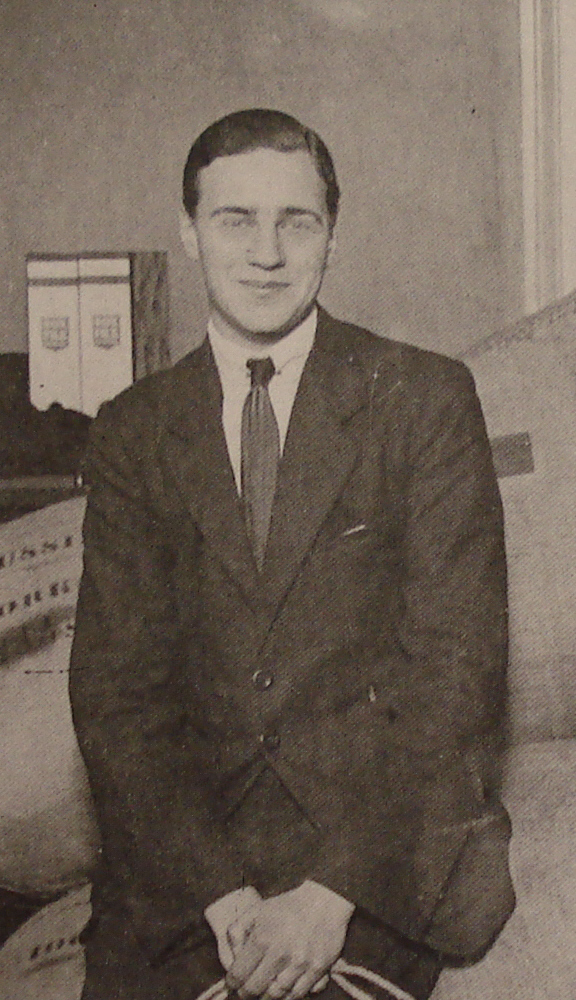
- Prince Nikita in 1919
- Born: 17 January 1900; 106 Moika Street, Saint Petersburg, Russian Empire
- Died: 12 September 1974 (aged 74); Cannes, France
- Spouse: Countess Maria Vorontsova-Dashkova (m. 1922)
- Issue: Prince Nikita Nikitich; Prince Alexander Nikitich
- House: Holstein-Gottorp-Romanov
- Father: Grand Duke Alexander Mikhailovich of Russia
- Mother: Grand Duchess Xenia Alexandrovna of Russia

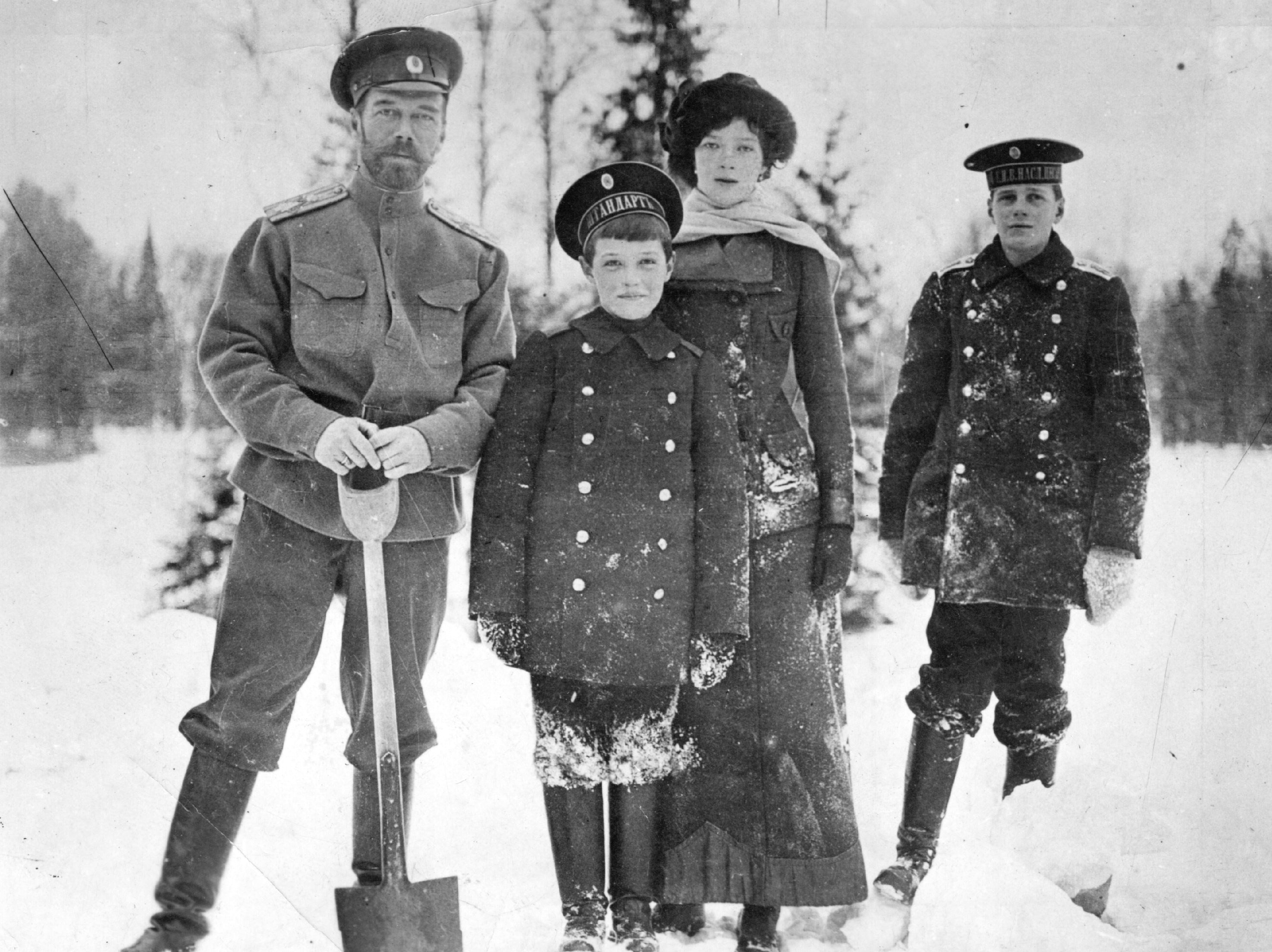
Nicholas II and his children Alexei and Tatiana, together with Nikita at Tsarskoye Selo

Prince of the Imperial Blood Nikita Alexandrovich of Russia (17 January [O.S. 4 January] 1900 – 12 September 1974) was the third son and fourth child of Grand Duke Alexander Mikhailovich of Russia and Grand Duchess Xenia Alexandrovna of Russia. He was a nephew of Tsar Nicholas II of Russia.

Born in Imperial Russia during the reign of his uncle, Prince Nikita escaped the fate of many of his relatives who were killed by the Bolsheviks. He left Russia in April 1919, at age nineteen. In 1922, he married Countess Maria Vorontsova-Dashkova. The couple had two children.

== Russian prince ==
Prince Nikita Alexandrovich was born in Saint Petersburg at his parents' palace at 106, Moika street. He was the son of Grand Duke Alexander Mikhailovich of Russia and Grand Duchess Xenia Alexandrovna of Russia. Through his mother he was a grandson of Tsar Alexander III of Russia and his consort, the Tsarina Maria Feodorovna of Russia (born Princess Dagmar of Denmark).

Prince Nikita spent his childhood and adolescence in fabulous splendor under the reign of his uncle, Tsar Nicholas II. He also traveled with his parents through Europe. A favorite destination was Ai-Todor, his father's estate, located in Crimea on the shores of the Black Sea. It was there where Prince Nikita and his immediate family found refuge from the disturbances in the former Imperial capital after the fall of the monarchy in Russia in February 1917. For a time, they lived there undisturbed. Their situation deteriorated after the Bolsheviks rose to power.

Prince Nikita was placed under house arrest with his parents and other members of the Romanov family in Crimea for sometime. He left Russia on 11 April 1919 with the help of his great-aunt Queen Alexandra of the United Kingdom (formerly Princess Alexandra of Denmark), a sister of the Dowager Tsarina Maria. King George V sent the British warship HMS Marlborough, which brought Prince Nikita's family and other members of the Romanov dynasty, headed by the Dowager Tsarina Maria Feodorovna, from the Crimea over the Black Sea to Malta and then to England.

== Exile ==
During his first years in exile, Prince Nikita lived in Paris in the house of his sister Princess Irina Alexandrovna of Russia. He moved later to England where he graduated from Oxford University. During his student years, Prince Nikita was president of the Oxford University Russian Club.

Prince Nikita Alexandrovich married a childhood friend: Countess Maria Vorontsova-Dashkova (13 February 1903 in Tsarskoye Selo, Russia – 15 June 1997 in Cannes, France) in Paris, France. Well known by White Russians in exile for her elegance and grace, the Princess was a daughter of Count Hilarion Vorontsov Illarionovich - Dashkov and his first wife, Irina, born Naryshkina. Maria was a direct descendant of several Russian noble families, including Dolgorukov, Naryshkin, and Shuvalov. The wedding took place on 19 February 1922 in Paris. The couple had two sons:

- Prince Nikita Romanov (13 May 1923 in London, England – 3 May 2007 in New York City)
- Prince Alexander Romanov (4 November 1929 in Paris, France – 21 September 2002 in London, England).

In the early 1920s in Paris, the Princess, with her husband's helped to create a collection for the company IRFE owned by Prince Felix Yusupov and his wife Princess Irina Alexandrovna, Nikita's sister. After the birth of his youngest son, Prince Nikita moved his family from Paris to England where his mother, Grand Duchess Xenia Alexandrovna lived.

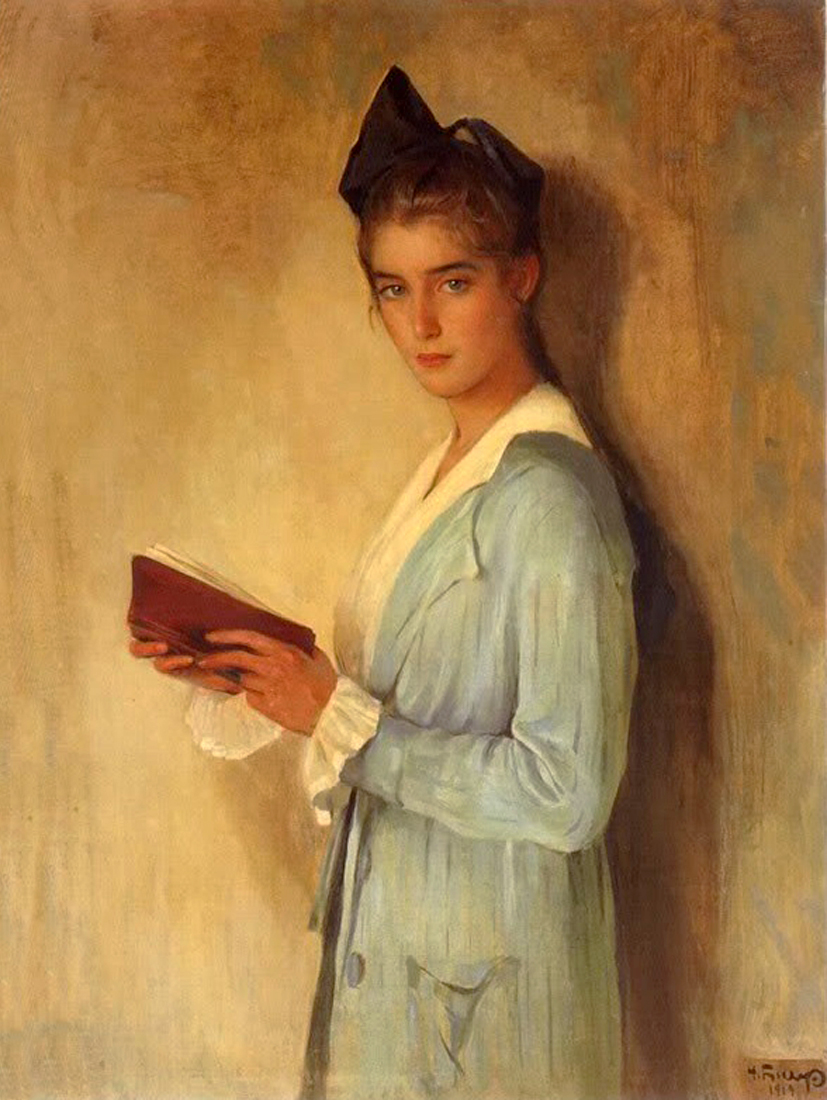
Maria Vorontsova-Dashkova, Nikita's wife

In exile, Nikita Alexandrovich was an active in the monarchist movement. He was a member of the oldest monarchist organization, the Supreme Monarchist Council. He was particularly involved during the 1920s and 1930s.

At the outbreak of World War II, Prince Nikita was living in Paris with his family. Unable to return to London, they moved to Rome and later to Czechoslovakia. As the Red Army advanced on the Eastern Front, fearing to end up in Soviet-occupied territory, the family moved back to Paris. When the war ended, they emigrated to the United States in 1946, settling in Monterey, California where Prince Nikita Alexandrovich taught Russian in army units. He later moved to New York City, working in banks and offices. In 1969, Prince Nikita Alexandrovich publicly dismissed Grand Duke Vladimir Kirillovich's claims to Grand Ducal status.

Throughout his life, Prince Nikita Aleksandrovich did not adopt any nationality, he decided to remain only Russian. In the early 1970s, Prince Nikita Alexandrovich and his wife returned to France. He died in 1974 in Cannes. He had wished to be buried in Ai-Todor in Crimea, but was buried in Roquebrune-Cap-Martin, next to his parents.

== Ancestry ==
Ancestors of Prince Nikita Alexandrovich of Russia

8. Nicholas I of Russia
4. Grand Duke Michael Nikolaevich of Russia
9. Princess Charlotte of Prussia
2. Grand Duke Alexander Mikhailovich of Russia
10. Leopold I, Grand Duke of Baden
5. Princess Cecilie of Baden
11. Princess Sofia of Sweden
1. Prince Nikita Alexandrovich of Russia
12. Alexander II of Russia
6. Alexander III of Russia
13. Princess Marie of Hesse
3. Grand Duchess Xenia Alexandrovna of Russia
14. Christian IX of Denmark
7. Princess Dagmar of Denmark
15. Princess Louise of Hesse-Kassel
