= Illarion Vorontsov-Dashkov =

Commander of the Russian Empire

Illarion Ivanovich Vorontsov-Dashkov Илларион Иванович Воронцов-Дашков
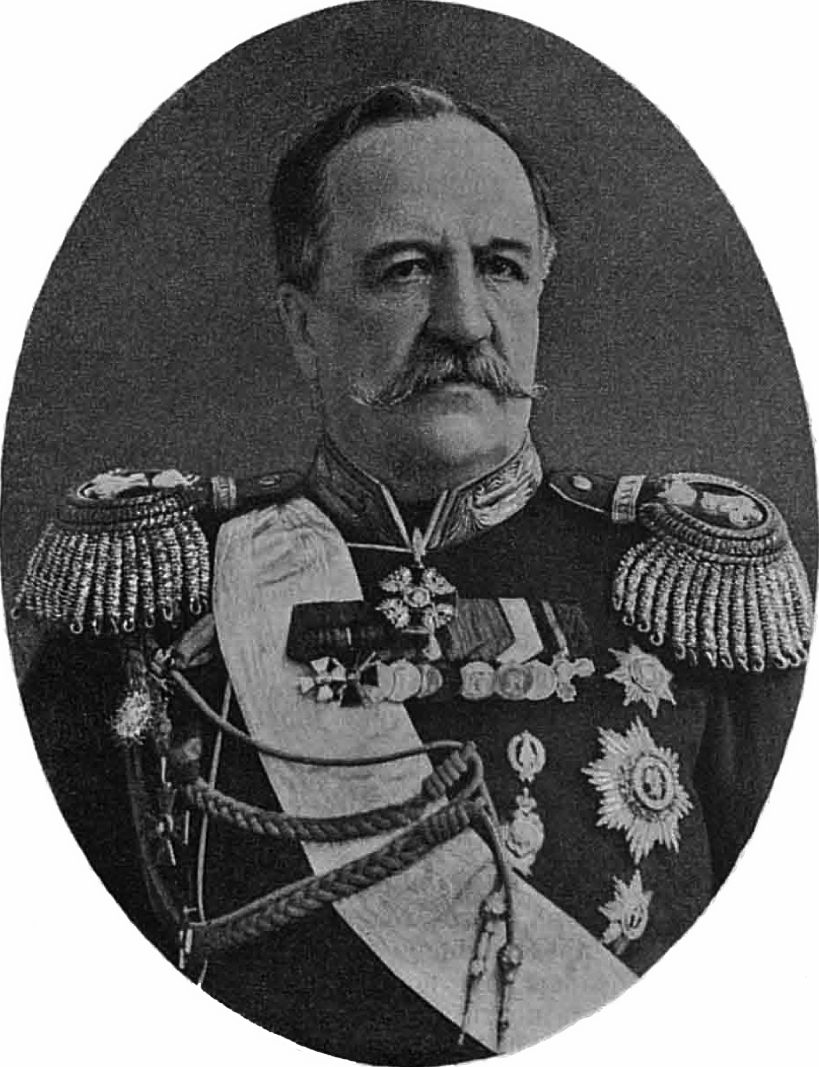
- Count Illarion Vorontsov-Dashkov
- Born: 27 May 1837; Saint Petersburg, Russian Empire
- Died: 15 January 1916 (aged 78); Alupka, Taurida Governorate, Russian Empire
- Military career
- Allegiance: Russian Empire
- Branch: Imperial Russian Army
- Service years: 1856–1916
- Rank: General of the Cavalry
- Commands: Russian Caucasus Army
- Conflicts: Caucasian War; Russo-Turkish War; Revolution of 1905; World War I
- Awards: see below

Count Illarion Ivanovich Vorontsov-Dashkov (Russian: Илларио́н Ива́нович Воронцов-Дашков; 27 May 1837 – 15 January 1916) was a Russian general and official. He served as served as Minister of Imperial Properties between 1881 and 1897 and as Governor-General of the Caucasus Viceroyalty between 1905 and 1915.

== Career ==
Illarion Vorontsov was born on 27 May 1837 in Saint Petersburg. He belonged to the noble family Vorontsov. He took part in the conquest of Central Asia in the 1860s and was appointed Major General in 1866. He was in charge of the Life Guard Horse Regiment in 1867–1874. He was on friendly terms with the future Alexander III of Russia and, following Alexander's father's assassination, established a counter-revolutionary squad, or druzhina, called the Holy Brotherhood.

Alexander III put Vorontsov-Dashkov in charge of the imperial court and made him Full General of Cavalry. He also was made responsible for imperial stud farms and vineyards. Following Nicholas II's coronation, he was dislodged from the office of Minister of Imperial Properties but was appointed to the State Council of Imperial Russia instead. The Russian Revolution of 1905 recalled Vorontsov to active service, and he ascended to the helm of the Viceroyalty of the Caucasus.

As Russia's second-to-last viceroy of the Caucasus, Vorontsov-Dashkov implemented several reformist policies, but his time in office was marred by a general era of revolution, war, and social upheaval.

He was officially in charge of the victorious Russian forces in the Battle of Sarikamish during the early months of World War I, although the effective command lay with General Alexander Myshlayevsky. In September 1915 he was removed from command and replaced with Grand Duke Nicholas. He died on 15 January 1916 in his Vorontsov Palace.

== Family ==
He married in 1867 Countess Elizaveta Andreevna Shuvalova, daughter of Count Andrei Petrovich Shuvalov. His youngest son Alexander's descendants represent the only continuation of the Vorontsov family in the male line.

== Awards and honours ==
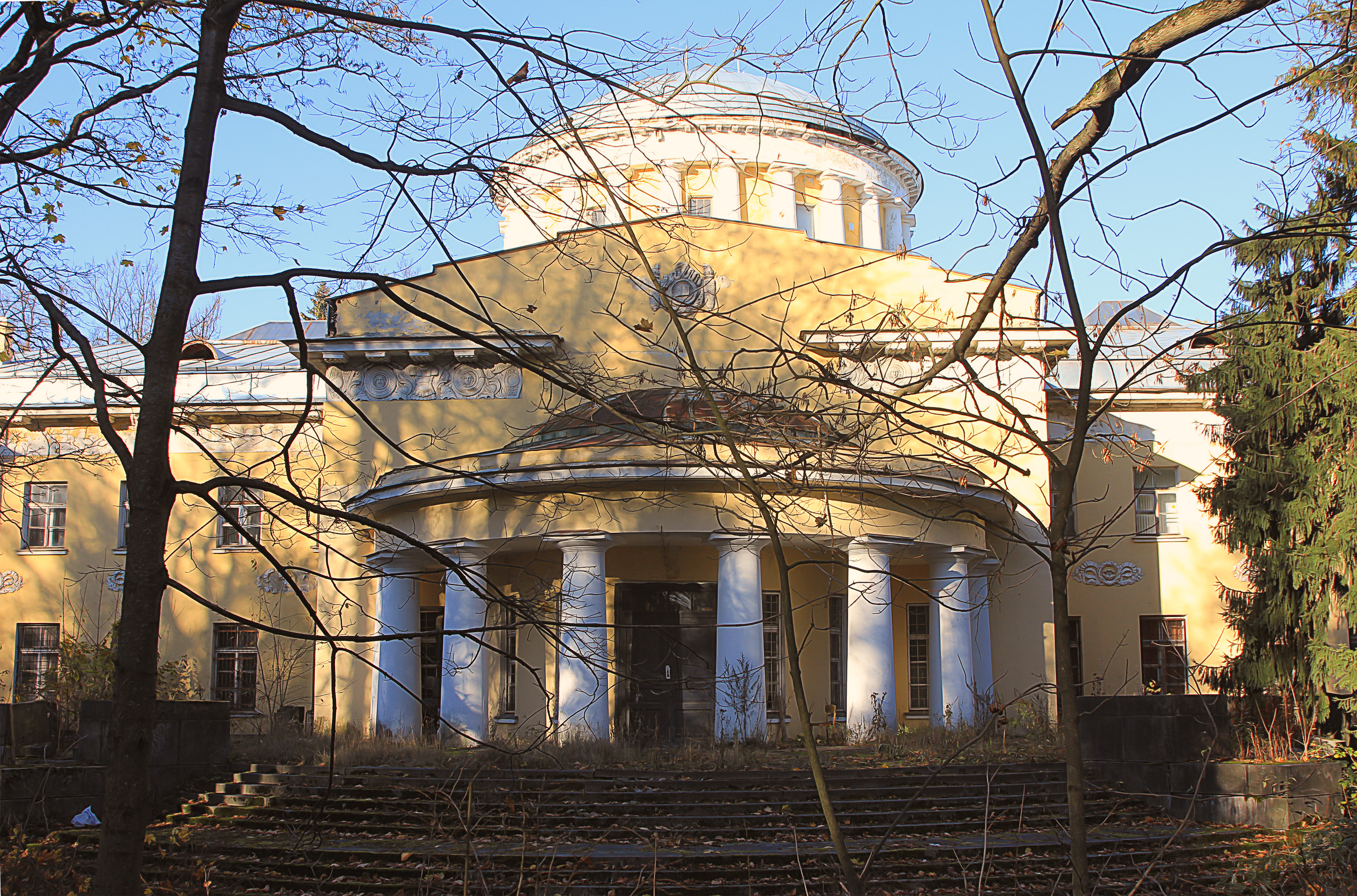
Vorontsov-Dashkov's villa in Pargolovo near St. Petersburg

Russian decorations

- Knight of St. Anna, 4th class, 1861; 3rd Class, 1864; 1st Class, 1870
- Gold Sword for Bravery, 4 June 1862
- Knight of St. Vladimir, 4th Class with Swords and Bow, 1865; 3rd Class with Swords, 1867; 2nd Class, 1874; 1st Class, 1894
- Knight of St. George, 4th class, for distinguished service during the war, 27 June 1867; 3rd Class "For the valiant skilful leadership of the Caucasian Army, whose heroic exploits achieved brilliant military success in actions against the Turks", 15 August 1915
- Knight of St. Stanislaus, 1st Class, 1868
- Knight of the White Eagle, with Swords, 1878
- Knight of St. Alexander Nevsky, 1883; in Diamonds, 1888
- Knight of St. Andrew, 14 May 1896; in Diamonds, 1904
- Portraits of the Emperors Alexander II and Alexander III, in Diamonds, 1908
- Portrait of Emperor Alexander III, in Diamonds, 21 February 1913

Foreign decorations

- Kingdom of Prussia:
  - Knight of the Red Eagle, 2nd Class with Star, 7 May 1873; Grand Cross, 9 September 1881; in Diamonds, 1884
  - Knight of the Black Eagle, 1889
- Saxe-Weimar-Eisenach: Knight of the White Falcon, 26 September 1865; Grand Cross, 1896
- Grand Duchy of Hesse:
  - Commander of the Merit Order of Philip the Magnanimous, 1st Class, 1865; Grand Cross, 1883
  - Grand Cross of the Ludwig Order, 1883
- French Empire: Officer of the Legion of Honour, 1865; Grand Cross, 1883
- Württemberg: Knight of the Württemberg Crown, 1865; Grand Cross, 1883
- (Austrian Empire) (Kingdom of Hungary) Austria-Hungary:
  - Grand Cross of the Order of Franz Joseph, 1872
  - Knight of the Iron Crown, 1st Class, 1874
  - Grand Cross of the Imperial Order of Leopold, 1883
  - Grand Cross of the Royal Hungarian Order of St. Stephen, 1884
- Sweden-Norway:
  - Commander Grand Cross of the Sword, 19 July 1875
  - Knight of the Seraphim, with Collar, 15 February 1892
- Kingdom of Greece: Grand Cross of the Redeemer, 1876
- Denmark:
  - Grand Cross of the Dannebrog, 19 August 1876; in Diamonds, 3 October 1881
  - Knight of the Elephant, 21 December 1891
- Principality of Serbia:
  - Grand Cross of the Cross of Takovo, 1881
  - Grand Cross of the White Eagle, 1896
- Principality of Montenegro: Grand Cross of the Order of Prince Danilo I, 1882
- Baden: Knight of the House Order of Fidelity, 1883
- Kingdom of Bavaria: Grand Cross of Merit of the Bavarian Crown, 1883
- Belgium: Grand Cordon of the Royal Order of Leopold, 1883
- Principality of Bulgaria: Grand Cross of St. Alexander, 1883
- (Saxe-Coburg and Gotha) (Duchy of Saxe-Altenburg) (Saxe-Meiningen) Ernestine duchies: Grand Cross of the Saxe-Ernestine House Order, 1883
- Holy See: Grand Cross of the Order of Pope Pius IX, 1883
- Empire of Japan: Grand Cordon of the Rising Sun, 1883
- Netherlands: Grand Cross of the Netherlands Lion, 1883
- Spain: Grand Cross of the Order of Charles III, 2 November 1883
- Kingdom of Italy: Grand Cross of Saints Maurice and Lazarus, 1884
- Persian Empire: Order of the August Portrait, in Diamonds, 1884
- Mecklenburg: Grand Cross of the Wendish Crown, 1889
- Siam: Grand Cross of the White Elephant, 1892
- Ottoman Empire: Order of Osmanieh, 1st Class, 1887; in Diamonds, 1893
- Oldenburg: Grand Cross of the Order of Duke Peter Friedrich Ludwig, 1895
- Kingdom of Romania: Grand Cross of the Star of Romania, 1895
- Qing dynasty: Order of the Double Dragon, Grade I Class III, 1896
- United Kingdom: Honorary Grand Cross of the Royal Victorian Order, 30 June 1896

== Ancestry ==
Ancestors of Count Illarion Ivanovich Vorontsov-Dashkov

16. Illarion Gavrilovich Vorontsov
8. Ivan Illarionovič Vorontsov
17. Anna Grigor'evna Maslova
4. Illarion Ivanovich Vorontsov
18. Artemy Petrovich Volynsky
9. Marija Artemyevna Volynskaja
19. Alexandra Lvovna Naryshkina
2. Ivan Illarionovich Vorontsov-Dashkov
20. Michail Petrovich Izmailov
10. Ivan Mikhailovich Izmailov
21. Jevdokia Vasilyevna
5. Irina Ivanovna Izmailova
22. Boris Grigorievich Yusupov
11. Alexandra Borisovna Yusupova
23. Irina Mikhailovna Zinovyeva
1. Illarion Ivanovich Vorontsov-Dashkov
24. Lev Alexandrovich Naryshkin
12. Alexander Lvovich Naryshkin
25. Marija Osipovna Zakrevskaya
6. Kirill Aleksandrovich Naryshkin
26. Alexey Naumovich Senyavin
13. Maria Alexeyevna Senyavina
27. Anna-Jelizaveta von Bradke
3. Aleksandra Kirillovna Naryshkina
28. Ivan Ivanovich Lobanov-Rostovsky
14. Yakov Ivanovich Lobanov-Rostovsky
29. Jekaterina Alexandrovna Kurakina
7. Marija Jakovlevna Lobanovaja-Rostovskaja
30. Nikolaj Nikolajevich Saltykov
15. Alexandra Nikolajevna Saltykova
31. Maria Jakovlevna Shakhovska
