= Kessenich (surname) =

Kessenich is a Low German toponymic surname, associated with Kessenich. Notable people with the surname include:

- Judy Michiels van Kessenich (1901–1972), Dutch artist
- Louise Kessenich-Grafemus (1786–1852), Prussian military officer
- Quint Kessenich (born 1967), American sportscaster
