= Musin-Pushkin House (Saint Petersburg) =

Building in Saint Petersburg, Russia

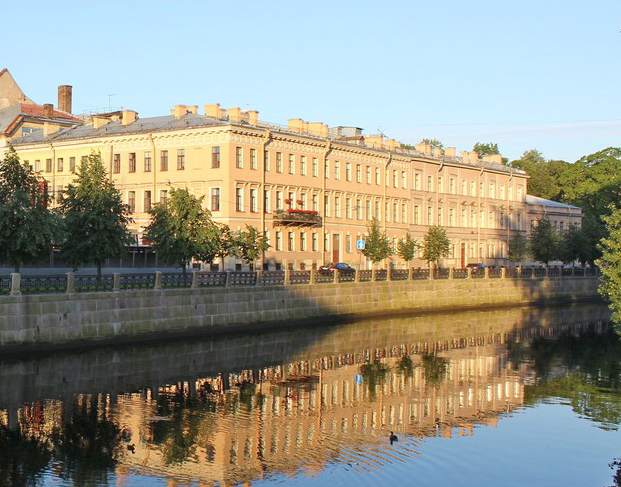
- Alternative names: Moyka River Embankment, 104

General information
- Location: 104, Moyka River Embankment, Saint Petersburg, Russia
- Coordinates: 59.9276°N 30.2918°E

The Musin-Pushkin House is an historic building in Saint Petersburg, located at number 104 on the Moyka River Embankment. It is also known as "A. I. Musin-Pushkin's House", and was built during the 18th and 19th centuries. The building's present appearance dates from 1848.

== History of the site ==
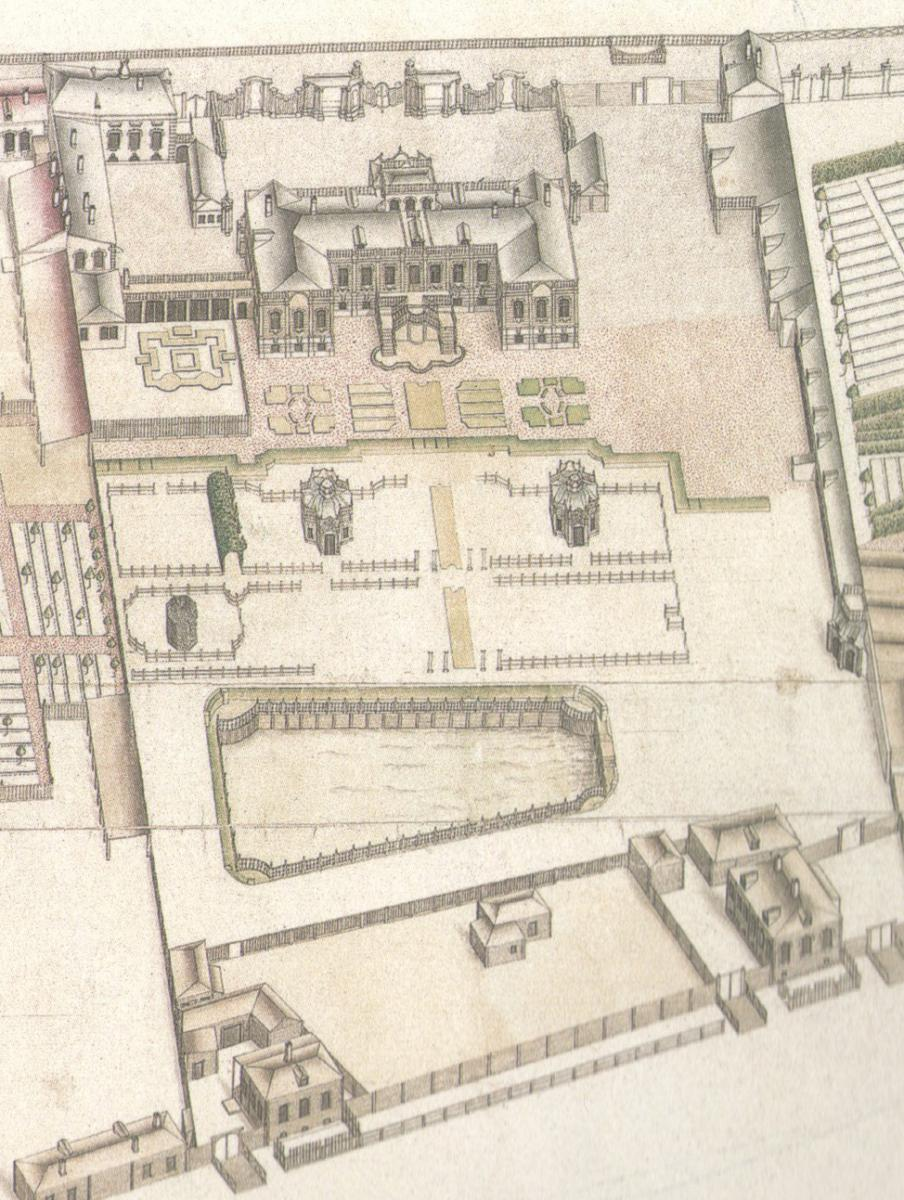
The Plot of the Musin-Pushkin Residence from the Axonometric Plan of Saint-Petersburg in Years 1765-1773 (by the P. de Saint-Hilaire, I. Sokolov, A. Gorikhvostov, et al.)

The first known owner of the site was State Councillor Anisim Semenovich Maslov, the chief procurator of the Senate. The site was later owned by Frantz Volodimerovich Gardner – a merchant who owned a rope factory in the Vyborgskaya Storona district of the city. In September 1755 the house was acquired by Nikita Akinfiyevich Demidov – a wealthy metal-industry entrepreneur who owned factories in Nizhny Tagil – from Gardner's widow. N. A. Demidov owned the estate for nearly 30 years, until 1782. In 1782 N. A. Demidov sold the house to Prince Grigory Potemkin, who immediately mortgaged it to Aleksei Musin-Pushkin. Musin-Pushkin acquired ownership of the estate in 1784 when Potemkin fell into arrears with his mortgage payments. Musin-Pushkin owned the mansion until 1798.

The next owner of the site with all the buildings and the garden was M. A. Kusovnikov, a merchant. In the 1804 city register the plot was placed in the fourth Admiralty division of the first block. The plot was numbered 46 and valued at 50,000 rubles. By the time of the 1822 register, the estate was owned by E. V. Kusovnikova, and was valued at 65,000 rubles. The house appears in Friedrich von Schubert's 1828 plan of the city, its appearance having altered slightly after the construction of an annex near the Moyka and a building along the left border of the plot of land as seen from the Moyka river. This building extended nearly up to the end of the plot and abutted the buildings of the Lithuanian castle. Two buildings parallel to each other stretched along Ofitserskaya ulitza (Officers' Street), where building 31 is now located. By 1828 that part of the estate was owned by the provisioning department of the Ministry of War, which remained its owner until 1842. In 1834 in accordance with E.V. Kusovnikova's will her granddaughter Yelena Petrovna Varentzova became the owner of the estate. That year street numeration was introduced, and the plot was designated as number 95 on the Moyka embankment.

In 1842, Y. P. Varentzova (Truveller) sold part of the plot to the Saint Petersburg City Duma, so that they could construct a street separating a prison building from local houses. In 1850 Y.P. Truveller made an official request asking St Petersburg's military Governor-General that the lane between her house and the Lithuanian castle be named Zamkovy (Castle lane). But the lane was named Tyremny (Prison lane) at the highest behest. In 1850 the house was sold to court counsellor, baron Alexander Borisovich von Vietinghoff, who presented the estate to his daughters Elizaveta and Ekaterina in 1870. In 1882 baron Rikhard Pavlovich von Vietinghoff became the owner of the whole plot, which at that time was numbered 102 on the Moyka embankment.

The site was renumbered again in the late 1880s, becoming 104 on the Moyka embankment. In 1894 von Vietinghoff's three daughters became the owners of the house and the plot, and in 1897 one of the daughters – Alexandra-Elizaveta Rikhardovna von Einsiedel, the wife of a major in the Royal Saxon Army – became the sole owner. In 1913 she sold the whole site to the Council of the Reformed Church schools. In 1918 the houses on the Moyka embankment were confiscated "on behalf of the Commissariat of the city household due to the default in payment on the part of the owners, who hadn't paid city taxes in 1917 and 1918".

== Construction history ==
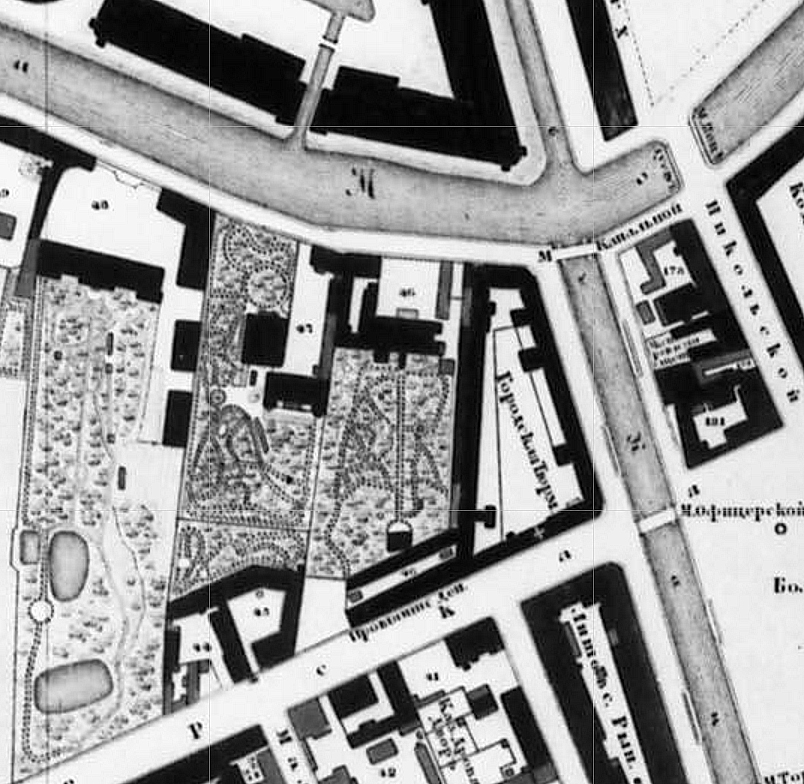
The Plot of the 104, Moyka River Embankment on the Shubert Plan, 1828

The view of the mansion with the garden was shown for the first time on Saint-Hilaire's plan: "a wooden house on a stone foundation with two risalits ("risalit" is a projection of a house) at the garden side is depicted in the back of the plot. On the right-hand part of the plot one can see that a one-storeyed stone annex facing the Moyka embankment is joined with the main house with a passage. There is a garden with a summerhouse, pavilions and a pond." A heavily sticking out projection with a broken pediment can be seen in the centre of the main façade. There is a symmetric staircase with four flights of stairs and a balustrade in the centre of the back façade. The main yard is located in front of the house, a pompous beautiful railing separates the yard from the Moyka embankment. The scientist and memoirist Yakob Shtelin wrote in his Notes of Arts in Russia about the unique iron portico, which the owner of metal-industry factories Nikita Akinfievich had set at his house on the Moyka embankment between both driveways to the yard from the street.

In 1773, Demidov leased the house to a plenipotentiary ambassador of His Majesty king of Great Britain. In the concluded contract there was a description of the house: "... situated in Admiralty division on the Moyka river opposite stone storehouses for timber. There is a big rich wooden house with all furniture in the middle of the plot. There is a kitchen in the yard and annexes for household servants to the left of the house, near the Moyka river. There are two cellars – an ice-house and a winter cellar, a stable with ten stalls, a carriage house, ... this house has got a garden with different prolific fruit... "

The plan of 1798 shows that Musin-Pushkin wasn't occupied much with alterations. The shape of one of the corners of the main building was changed a little, while the passage to the annex facing the Mojka and annex itself remained unchanged. Looking at the engineering drawings from the City Council fund one can follow the further history of alterations of the mansion. The main house remained intact until 1913 when the right-hand part of the new building of the Reformation church school replaced it (architect A.A. Gimpel). A conservatoire music school is in this building nowadays (pereulok Matveeva 1; Matveev lane 1). The garden and the household structures didn't survive.

First considerable alterations of the mansion look are connected with the names of Yelena Petrovna Truveller, her husband engineer-captain Robert Ivanovich and his brother retired engineer-major Vasily Ivanovich. A new three-storeyed stone house – nine axes along the Moyka and seven axes along the lane – was built in the style of Classicism at the corner of the Mojka embankment and the newly laid lane. Simultaneously another house was built in eight axes, with more unpretentious decoration, abutting right against the three-storey house from the lane side.

In 1847, the Truvellers decided to have storeys added to the L-shaped annex, which face the main site of the Moyka with two storeys, of the old house. They commissioned the architect N. P. Grebenka to do it. Simultaneously a new part of the house symmetrically replicating its structure was attached to the left side of the annex. Thus, the annex was completely included in the new house, only having the window decoration style changed from Baroque to Neo Renaissance. Two storeys were added to the part of the annex which faced the yard. But that part of the annex didn't lose its connection with the old wooden house on the stone basement. The Baroque window decoration of the back facade of the annex wasn't changed and has survived till the present day. A two-storeyed stone laundry built in the 18th century joins the old house with one side and the front annex with the other (the laundry building also has survived).

In 1848, the existing house on the left, the Truvellers had that house built in 1836, was completed with participation of the architect R. B. Berngard in the Classicical style. That house fully merged with Grebenka's house (with three storeys at the front facade and four storeys at the yard facade). Thus, the final look of the house was formed, and it has been unchanged till nowadays.

== Famous residents ==
Frantz Yakovlevich Gardner, the future founder of the porcelain factory in Verbilky village, lived for several years at his uncle in the house on the Mojka embankment. There is a reference to "a foreign merchant Englishman Frantz Gardner's mansion behind the river Mja" in 1737 Admiraltejsky (Admiralty) Island household census. The 1737 census indicates that Frantz Gardner was 40 years old and he had a nephew Frantz Gardner aged 27.

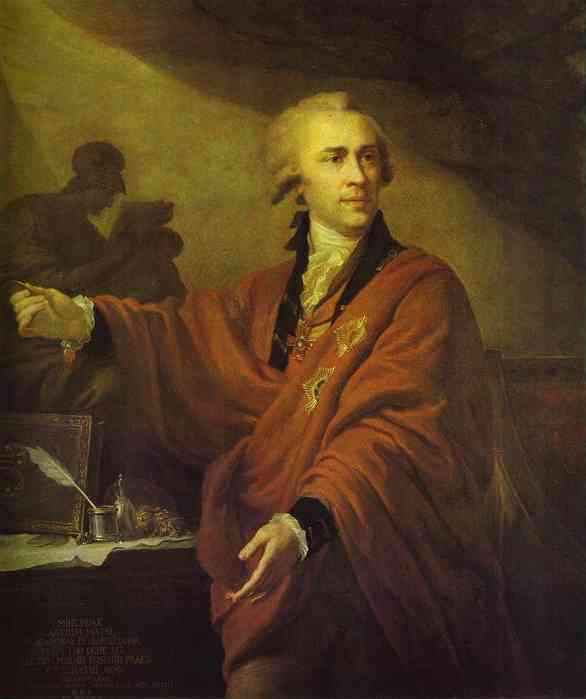
J. B. Lampi. Portrait of Aleksei I. Musin-Pushkin. 1790s

A.I. Musin-Pushkin lived for 17 years in that house, from 1782 till 1798. Nearly all his children were born there, and his main brainchild – the famous collection of Russian antiquities – was created there. Members of "Lovers of Motherland History Study Group" attended meetings there. Formed by Musin-Pushkin, the study group was based upon Vasily Tatishchev's (V. N. Tatischev) theoretical views: I. N. Boltin and Ivan Yelagin (I. P. Yelagin), historian-archivists N. N. Bantysh-Kamensky and A. F. Malinovsky and many others were members of the study group. They gathered to discuss historical and linguistic issues, and the owner willingly allowed them to use his materials. Nikolay Karamzin (N. M. Karamzin) was also associated with the study group. The main purpose of the study group was to preserve a wide range of ancient sources about history and culture of the Russian State and to use that range in social and scientific circulations. Due to Musin-Pushkin, zeal for artefacts of the past got – for the first time in Russia – hitherto unseen scale, organization and insistence to find various sphere of sources, including materials for history of the 18th century. Yaroslav the Wise (Yaroslav Mudry's) Russkaya Pravda ("The Russian Truth"), Vladimir II Monomakh's "Moral", Musin-Pushkin's own work about Tmutarakan princedom's location and Laurentian Codex (Lavrenty's annals) were made ready for publishing there. After all, it was exactly there where the pearl of his collection – the famous The Tale of Igor's Campaign – was kept and made ready for publishing. In the first publishing in 1800 "The Song ..." was titled "The ironic song about Novgorod-Seversky appanage prince Igor Svyatoslavovich's campaign against the Polovtsians. The Song was written in old Russian language at the end of the 12th century and it was transferred into presently used dialect."

The period of highest flourishing in Musin-Pushkin's state, public and collecting activities fell on his residence in Saint-Petersburg in the house on the Moyka embankment. He became a member of the Russian Academy of Sciences (1789), he was the president of Imperial Academy of Arts (1794-1797), the head of the Holy Synod (1791-1797), actual Councillor of State (1784), actual Privy Councillor (1793), the managing director of foreign coreligionists school (1789). Catherine the Second patronized him. His colleagues from the Academy were attracted to his house because of his presidency in the Academy of Arts and his collection of works of art. Musin-Pushkin was the chairman of the committee of the Academy of Sciences which awarded gold medals. It is known that the committee was usually in session at his house.

According to E. I. Krasnova, who got the Antsiferov Prize and is the author of many scientific historical discoveries, Musin-Pushkin's study and his richest collection were placed in the stone annex. Doctor of History V. S. Sobolev and director of Russian State Navy Archive Doctor of History E. V. Anisimov, who is a senior research assistant of Saint-Petersburg Institute of the Russian Academy of Sciences, support that point of view: "his collection, including 'The Song of Igor's Campaign', was exactly in the annex which faced the Moyka embankment".T The annex was assigned to Musin-Pushkin's working space, while his large family occupied the main house. By 1793 Musin-Pushkin had got more than 1700 manuscripts available, the richest collection of book rarities.

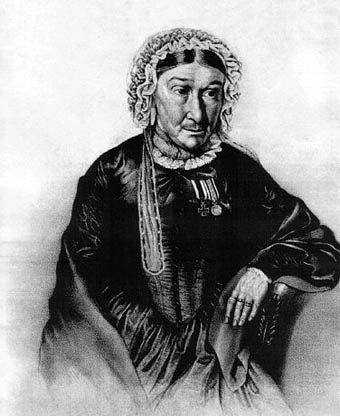
Louise Kessenih-Graphemes. 1852. Lithography of A. E. Munster from the drawing of I. S. Shedrovsky

In the 1840s, Louise Kessenih-Graphemes, a famous woman-bearer of the order, the keeper of "Red Tavern", also kept a dancing school in the house on the Moyka embankment. Louise Kessenikh, being the mother of two children, concealed her sex to become a participant in the Napoleonic Wars in 1812-1815 as a Prussian uhlan cavalry sergeant. During one of the campaigns she captured an enemy officer and six soldiers. She was awarded an Iron Cross for that exploit. Since 1817 Louise lived in Saint-Petersburg and was involved in private entrepreneur activities.

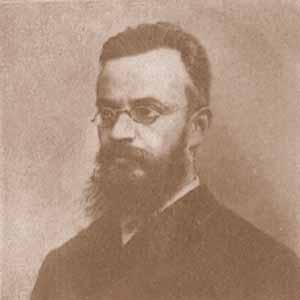
Grigory Grum-Grshimailo, Russian entomologist and researcher of Central Asia

Grigory Grum-Grshimailo (1860–1936), a Russian entomologist, best known for his expeditions to Central Asia (Pamir, Bukhara, Tian-Shan, Kan-su, and Kukunor), West Mongolia and Tuva, and the Russian Far East lived in the house from 1906 to 1913.

From 1912 till 1917 Countess Lybov Valerjanovna Golovina (b. 1851) and her family lived in that house. She was an Imperial chamberlain's widow and Countess von Hohenfelsen's sister. Countess von Hohenfelsen – Princess Olga Paley – was Grand Duke Paul Alexandrovich of Russia (Pavel Alexandrovich Romanov's) morganatic spouse. The Grand Prince was Emperor Nikolas the Second's youngest uncle. L. V. Golovina's daughter Maria Evgenevna (also called "Munya") was in the inner circle of people close to Grigori Rasputin. During the preliminary investigation of the case of his murder she testified that G. Rasputin and prince Felix Yusupov had met 5 years before that in the Golovins' apartment on the Zimnaya Kanavka (Winter Channel,) 6 (the Golovins lived there at that time). And in 1916 they met again in the Golovins' apartment on the Moyka embankment, 104. After that Yusupov under pretence of his chest pain made closer contact with Rasputin getting ready for murdering him. Olga Vladimirovna Lokhtina, an actual Councillor of State's wife, lived together with the Golovins in the house on the Mojka river. O.V. Lokhtina left home in 1910 because of her family's irreconcilable attitude to Rasputin. Lokhtina had been his admirer since 1905 when he cured her of a hazardous disease. Lokhtina was the editor of G. E. Rasputin's book "Pious Thoughts" published in 1912 in Saint-Petersburg and carried out many secretarial duties for him. She seldom went out because of her mentally unhealthy condition.

Viktor Viktorovich Sobolev (1915–1999) lived in the house 104 on the Moyka river. He was a Russian and Soviet astrophysicist, an academician of the Academy of Sciences of the USSR (1981), the founder of Leningrad astrophysicist school, the author of the famous Course of theoretical astrophysics, a Hero of Socialist Labour (1985), a bearer of the Order of Lenin and a bearer of two Order of the Red Banner. Judging by the aggregate contribution to emission transfer analytic theory, V. V. Sobolev and his school are beyond comparison in the world of astrophysics. V. V. Sobolev not only made a fundamental contribution to each of the main partitions of that theory, but also was at the origins of five of those partitions. V. V. Sobolev lectured and headed the astrophysics sub department at Leningrad State University (Saint Petersburg State University). His monograph "Moving Sidereal Covers" (Leningrad State University publishing house, 113 pages) became the classics of theoretical astrophysics. Simultaneously V. V. Sobolev worked on a voluntary basis at the Astronomical observatory of Leningrad State University as director. After that he was the head of the astronomy Branch of the department of mathematics and mechanics of Leningrad State University. Due to his efforts, one succeeded in reforming the astronomy Branch of Leningrad State University to Astronomical Institute. Nowadays Astronomical Institute of Saint Petersburg State University bears the name of V. V. Sobolev.

== Protective status of the house ==
Till 2001 the house 104 on the Moyka embankment was on the books at the State Control, Usage and Protection of historical and cultural artifacts Committee. The house was "in the list of newly discovered objects of historical, scientific, artistic or other cultural value" and was in the United protection zone of central districts of Saint-Petersburg. In 2001 the house was struck off the list.

In 2015 (the Year of Literature) an application was made to the Committee about including the house 104 on the Moyka embankment – as having features of a cultural heritage object – in the United State Register of cultural heritage objects (historical and cultural artifacts) of peoples of the Russian Federation and about setting a memorial plaque on the house. The initiative was sustained by leading core institutions and organizations of Saint-Petersburg. Among them – the Institute of Russian literature (the Pushkin House) of the Russian Academy of Sciences, the National Library of Russia, the Saint Petersburg Union of Artists, the Architects' Union of Saint-Petersburg, Art historians' and Art critics' Association of Saint-Petersburg. The initiative was also sustained by A. A. Kovalev, a deputy of Saint-Petersburg legislative assembly.

== The house in art and literature ==
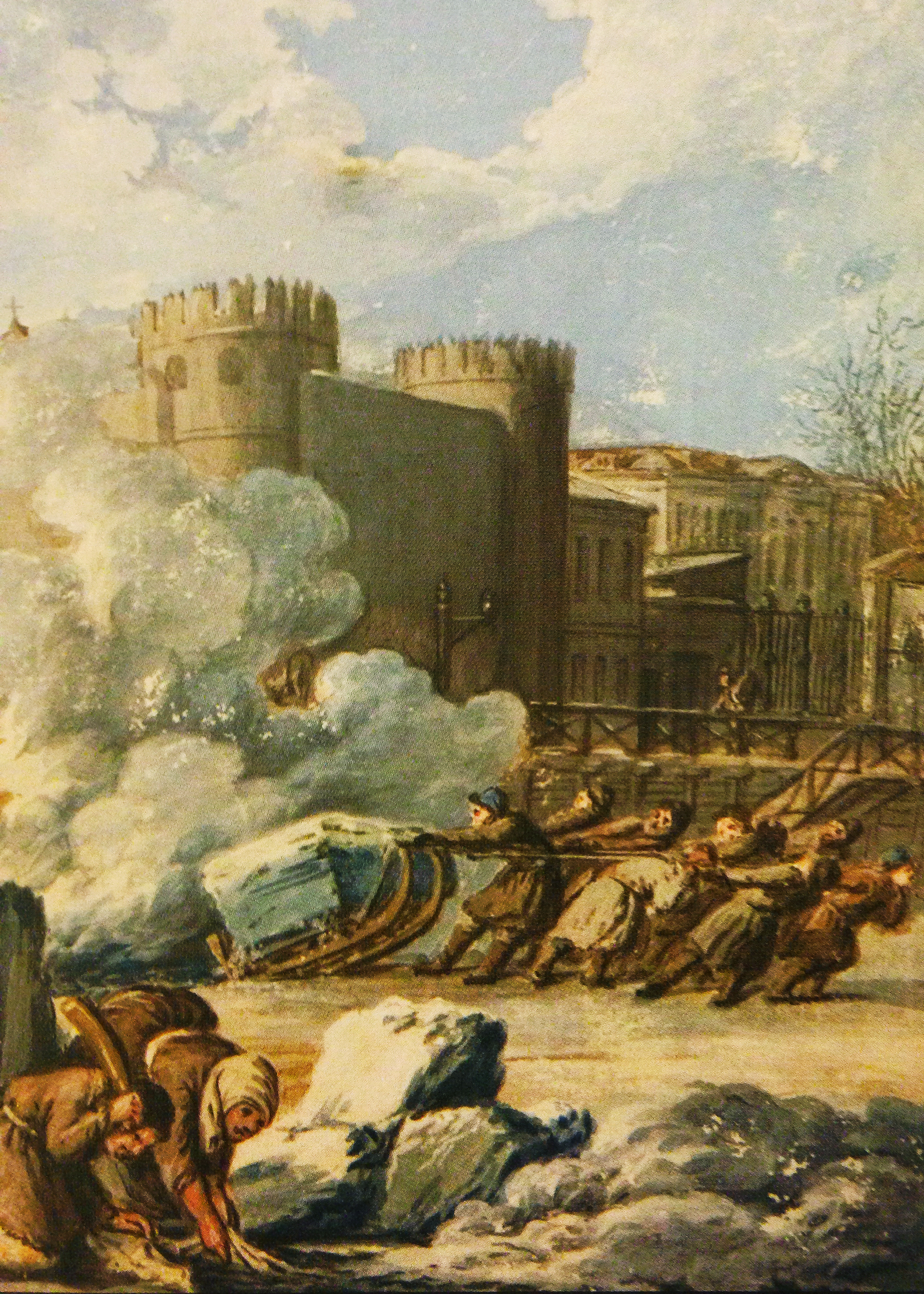
The Musin-Pushkins House in the watercolour of K. F. Knappe, 1798. Fragment

Karl Friedrikh Knappe, A. I. Musin-Pushkin's colleague at the Academy of Fine Arts, depicted in his watercolour the house during Musin-Pushkin's ownership. One can see a massive railing just behind the Lithuanian Castle, and behind the railing in the back of the plot – a fragment of the front façade of the old house, which was purchased by Musin-Pushkin from Demidov.

A description of the Golovins' way of life in the house on the Moyka (from V. A. Zhukovskaya's notes about G. Rasputin):

It was in 1914, soon after I had made the acquaintance of R. (Rasputin), when I came to them on Munya's invitation. It was an old dark house with entresols on the Mojka. The house had inner oak staircases laid over with thick carpets, a silent boy servant in a big cool anteroom, a white living-room with Venetian mirrors and lacquered furniture, a silk boudoir with a monster dog of bulldog breed sleeping in the corner of a low quilted sofa. There was also a marvelous old portrait by Levitsky in a carved frame, cracked chinaware and eerie silence of forsaken chambers, occasionally sharply broken by telephone ring. When I made acquaintance of them the father had already died, and the three women were living there: Lub. Val. with her daughters. The elder daughter – Olga Evgenjevna – was a hospital nurse and seldom came home. The grandmother – Olga Vasiljevna Karnovich – was nicknamed "an eagle" by R. She lived separately and came from time to time in her silk two-seater carriage drawn by two dark bay horses; more often the family came to visit her. She treated R. with disapproval – as she told me herself – but tenderly loving Munya, she concealed her animosity and sometimes even acknowledged meekly, that "it is not for us to judge" and asked R. to pray. The whole way of life in the house was nearly cloistral: strictly established time of dinner and breakfast, resigned respectfulness of Lub. Val. to her mother and of her daughters to herself. Orders were given in a low voice, nearly in whisper, servants slid silently. There were icon-lamps in front of sacred images, subtle smell of hothouse flowers, candles, old fabric, perfume and frankincense losing their fragrance – the smell like the one in Father Superiors' monastic cells and manor houses, where one and the same people have lived for a long time. And along with it, there was R.'s unbridled liberty, his rollicking words and dancing mania, and Munya's belief in his holiness, and Lub. Val.'s sincere commitment to him. And at the same time there was Lokhtina's wild shouting: «Prostrate yourselves in adoration! The god himself has descended on the Earth!» – her hysterical tricks and absurd clothes with waving ribbons…

In 1984, film director Vitaly Melnikov shot a full-length colour television feature film Another Man's Wife and a Husband under the Bed, based upon early short-stories by Fyodor Dostoyevsky (F. M. Dostoevsky). The film was shot at Lenfilm film studio. The shooting was made on the Moyka embankment against the background of the house 104.

One can find depictions of the house in works by Alexandre Benois (A. N. Benois) and Anna Ostroumova-Lebedeva (A. P. Ostroumova-Lebedeva).

== See also ==
- List of buildings and structures in Saint Petersburg

== Sources ==
- Перепись дворов Адмиралтейского острова в 1737 г. // Российский государственный архив древних актов. Москва. Ф. 248. Д. 201.
- Сведения к истории домов Нарвской и Адмиралтейской частей в Петербурге за 1745—1858 годы. // Центральный государственный исторический архив. Санкт-Петербург. Ф. 2263. Оп. 1. Д. 38. Л. 35.
- Контракт на сдачу внаём. 1755 г. // Российский государственный архив древних актов. Москва. Ф. 285, Оп.1, Д.407, Л. 154.
- The Axonometric Plan of Saint-Petersburg in Years 1765-1773 (by the P. de Saint-Hilaire, I. Sokolov, A. Gorikhvostov, et al.) Supplement. Saint-Petersburg, 2003. P. 93.
- Контракт на сдачу внаём. 1773 г. // Российский государственный архив древних актов. Москва. Ф. 1267, Оп.1, Д.444, Л. 198.
- Купчая на продажу дома Потемкину, от лица которого «все дела представительствовал г-н Алексей Иванович Пушкин». 1782 г. // Российский государственный архив древних актов. Москва. Ф. 1267. Oп. 1. Д. 337 Л. 366.
- Отъезжающие. // СПб Ведомости. 1798 г. С. 1695.
- Атлас г. Петербурга. 1798 г. План 4 Адмиралтейской части 1 и 2 кварталов. XXIV план // Центральный государственный исторический архив. Санкт-Петербург. Ф. 513. Оп.168. No. 319 Л. 28.
- Рукописная «Роспись домов Санкт-Петербурга» 12, составленная в самые последние годы XVIII в., указывает, что участком No. 1 на приложенном плане 4-й Адмиралтейской части владеет «тайный советник, Синода обер-прокурор Алексей Иванович Мусин-Пушкин» // Отдел Рукописей Российской Национальной библиотеки, Санкт-Петербург, 0-IV-56.
- Табель, означающая полупроцентный сбор в доход, городу подлежащий... 1804 г. // Центральный государственный исторический архив. Санкт-Петербург.. Ф. 513. Оп. 168. Д. 327—331.
- Табель процентному сбору, подлежащему в доход С.-Петербурга с переоценки обывательских домов и мест. 1822 г. // Российский государственный исторический архив. Санкт-Петербург. Ф. 1329. Оп.1 Д. 407.
- Правительствующего Сената Санкт-Петербургских департаментов объявления к Санкт-Петербургским ведомостям. 1834. No. 97, 4 дек. С. 29.
- План по 4 Адмиралтейской части, 1го квартала. 1836 г. // Центральный государственный исторический архив. Санкт-Петербург. Ф. 513. Оп.102. No. 3677. Л. 159.
- Чертежи Городской управы. 1836—1886 гг. // Центральный государственный исторический архив. Санкт-Петербург. Ф.513. Оп.102. Д.3667. Л.161-189.
- Объявление 1842 г. в Спб Ведомостях, в котором Луиза Кессених извещает почтенную публику, что в доме клуба под No. 95, против Новой Голландии, начнутся сего сентября 12, танц-классы. // Прибавление к Санкт-Петербургским ведомостям. 1842. No. 212, 19 сент.
- Весь Петербург на 1912 г. Санкт-Петербург, 1912. С. 221.
- Дневники наружного наблюдения Отделения по охранению общественной безопасности и порядка в Петрограде. 1903—1916 // Государственный архив Российской Федерации, Москва. Ф.111, Д. 2978, оп.1.
- Весь Петроград на 1917 г. Санкт-Петербург, 1917. С. 169.
- Убийство Распутина: Официальное дознание // Былое. 1917. No. 1. С. 68-71.
- Записки Якоба Штелина. Об изящных искусствах в России. В 2-х томах. Составление, перевод с немецкого, вступительная статья, предисловия к разделам и примечания К. В. Малиновского. М.: Искусство. 1990. С.165
- А. И. Мусин-Пушкин и его потомки в истории России. Проблемы сохранения рода, международная научная конференция. Рыбинск, 1994.
- Аксенов А. И. С любовью к Отечеству и просвещению. А .И. Мусин-Пушкин. Рыбинск: Рыбин. подворье, 1994.
- Мусины-Пушкины. [Книга-альбом/Сост.: Т. И. Гулина и др.]. Ярославль: Верх.-Волж. кн. изд-во, 1996.
- Краснова Е. И. На Мойке против «Новой Голландии» (История участка домов No. 104 по Мойке, No. 31 и 33 по ул. Декабристов и No. 1-5 по пер. Матвеева Ч. 1) // Петербургские чтения — 97. (Энциклопедическая библиотека «Санкт-Петербург — 2003»). СПб., 1997. С. 42—45.
- Краснова Е. И. Алексей Иванович Мусин-Пушкин в Петербурге// Мусины-Пушкины в истории России. К 250-летию со дня рождения А. И. Мусина-Пушкина. Рыбинское подворье. 1998.
- Краснова Е. И. Алексей Иванович Мусин-Пушкин в Петербурге// Невский архив. Историко-краеведческий сборник. Т.4. СПб., 1999. С. 195—207.
- Краснова Е. И., Лукоянов А. Н. На Мойке против «Новой Голландии» (История участка домов No. 104 по Мойке, No. 31 и 33 по ул. Декабристов и No. 1-5 по пер. Матвеева Ч. 2. XIX-начало XX в.) // Петербургские чтения — 97. (Энциклопедическая библиотека «Санкт-Петербург — 2003»). СПб., 1997. С. 109—113.
- Логутова Е. В. К истории художественных выставок в Санкт-Петербурге XIX- начала XX в.// Труды Исторического факультета Санкт-Петербургского университета. Выпуск No. 2 / 2010. С. 284—293.
