= Louise Kessenich-Grafemus =

Prussian military officer (1786–1852)

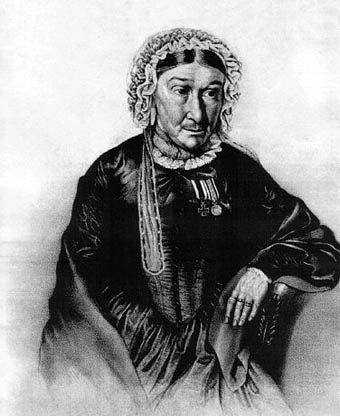
- Louise Kessenikh-Graphemes in 1852
- Born: 1785; Hanau, Prussia
- Died: 30 October 1852 (aged 65–66)

Louise Kessenich-Grafemus (1785 — 30 October 1852) was a Prussian female officer and participant in the war against Napoleon. From 1817, she lived in St. Petersburg, where she was a private entrepreneur.

== Biography ==
=== Early life and military career ===
Kessenich-Grafemus was born in 1785 as Esther Manuel, in the city of Hanau in Prussia. She was born into a Jewish family.

She married a man by the surname of Grafemus, who worked as an apprentice in a jewelry workshop. The couple lived in Fulda. In 1806, she gave birth to a daughter, followed by a son in 1808. In 1809, her husband left the family for Russia and joined as a volunteer in a Russian lancer regiment. In 1813, the Russian army entered Prussian territory while pursuing Napoleon's troops. Louise decided to leave her children in the care of relatives and volunteered as a lancer in the Prussian army in order to find her husband. In order to volunteer, Louise needed to supply her own uniform and arms. In search of patrons who could finance the purchase of a horse, weapons, and equipment, Louise turned to Princess Maria Anna of Hesse-Homburg, wife of Prussian Prince Wilhelm. The Prince and the Princess agreed to give Louise the necessary funds, and purchased her a horse, a uniform, and a gun, to send her to war dressed as a man. She joined as a volunteer in the 2nd Königsberg Uhlan Militia Regiment, commanded by Major Herman.

In early 1814, the Prussian army marched towards Paris. The regiment in which Louise served marched to the French capital via Holland. During this campaign, Louise captured an officer and six enemy soldiers. For this feat, she was awarded the Iron Cross. Louise and her regiment made a victorious march across France and arrived in Paris on 29 March 1814. As the allied troops entered Paris, Louise finally reunited with her husband, but he was killed the next day during a battle in Montmartre. When she was reunited with her husband, she revealed her identity as a woman, apparently causing a sensation among the soldiers she's been serving with.

Following the anti-Napoleon campaign, Louise was granted a pension of two thalers per month, effective March 1816. The pension was the same amount given to soldiers and lower ranks of the Prussian army, but Louise felt offended by the amount, considering it too little. The pension only made it possible to lead a very modest life, barely making ends meet. Although Louise's attempts to increase her Prussian pension failed, she was eligible to apply for a Russian pension due to the service of her husband. At the end of March 1817, Louise received her pension in Prussia for the last time, then arranged for the transfer of her pension to Russia and left for St. Petersburg. The fate of her children is unknown; Louise never returned to Prussia, remaining in Russia until her death.

=== Life in St. Petersburg ===
In St. Petersburg, Louise remarried to a well-known Riga bookbinder, a native of Cologne, German Lutheran Johann Cornelius Kessenich, and bought housing in St. Petersburg. She bought the Krasnyy kabachok tavern.

Her great-great-granddaughter was famous Soviet actress Tatyana Piletskaya.

== See also ==
- Musin-Pushkin House (Saint Petersburg)
