= Maria Feodorovna (Dagmar of Denmark) =

Empress of Russia from 1881 to 1894

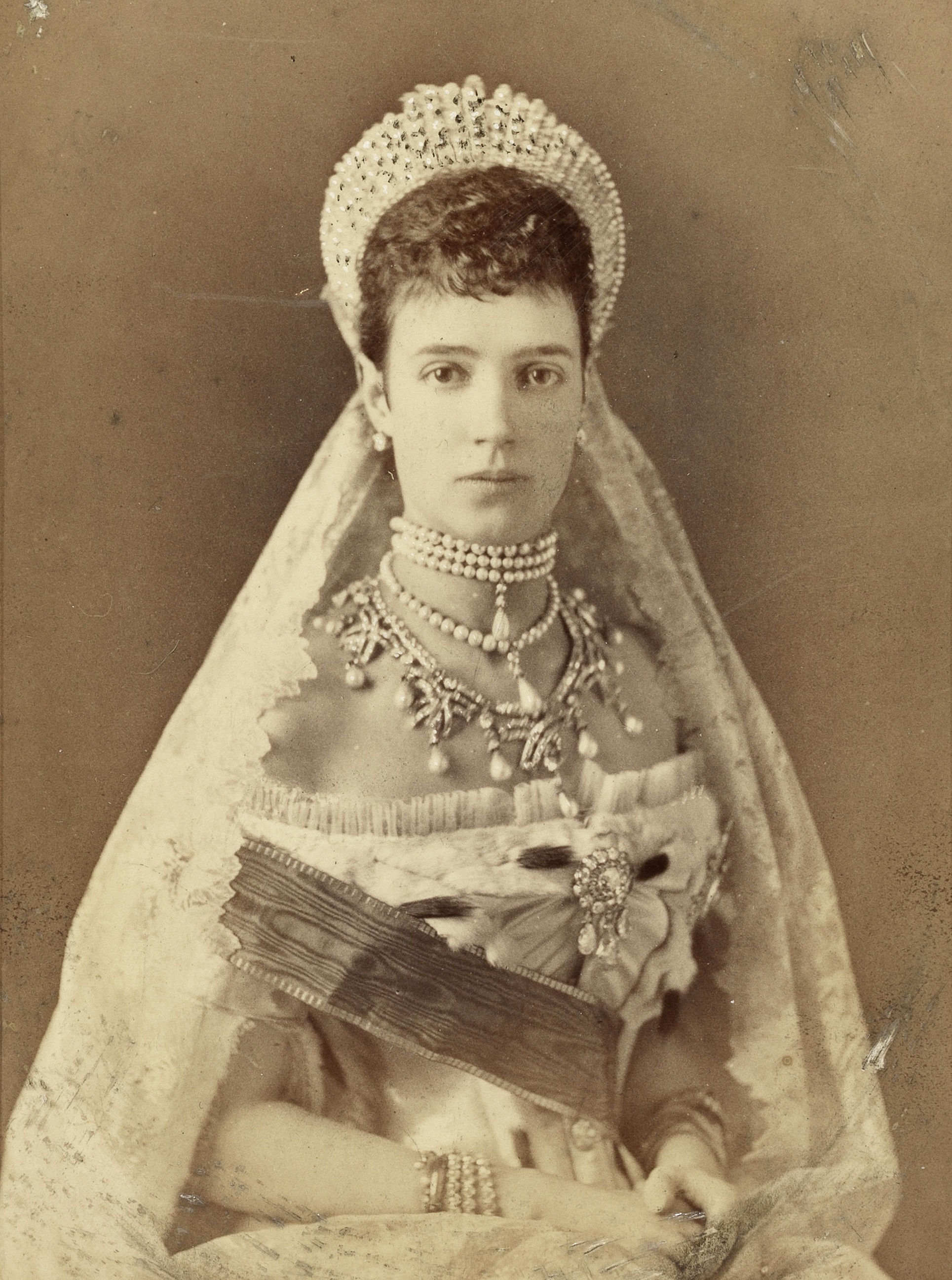
- Empress Maria in 1881

Empress consort of Russia
- Tenure: 13 March 1881 – 1 November 1894
- Coronation: 27 May 1883
- Born: Princess Dagmar of Schleswig-Holstein-Sonderburg-Glücksburg; 26 November 1847; Yellow Mansion, Copenhagen, Denmark
- Died: 13 October 1928 (aged 80); Hvidøre House, Klampenborg, Denmark
- Burial: October 1928 Roskilde Cathedral; 28 September 2006 Saints Peter and Paul Cathedral, Saint Petersburg, Russia (reinterment)
- Spouse: Alexander III of Russia (m. 1866; died 1894)
- Issue: Nicholas II; Grand Duke Alexander; Grand Duke George; Grand Duchess Xenia; Grand Duke Michael; Grand Duchess Olga
Names
- Marie Sophie Frederikke Dagmar
- House: Glücksburg
- Father: Christian IX of Denmark
- Mother: Louise of Hesse-Kassel

Maria Feodorovna (Russian: Мария Фёдоровна; 26 November 1847 – 13 October 1928), known as Princess Dagmar of Denmark before her marriage, was Empress of Russia from 1881 to 1894 as the wife of Emperor Alexander III. She was the fourth child and second daughter of Christian IX of Denmark and Louise of Hesse-Kassel. Maria’s eldest son, Nicholas II, was the last Emperor of Russia, ruling from 1 November 1894 until his abdication on 15 March 1917.

== Appearance and personality ==
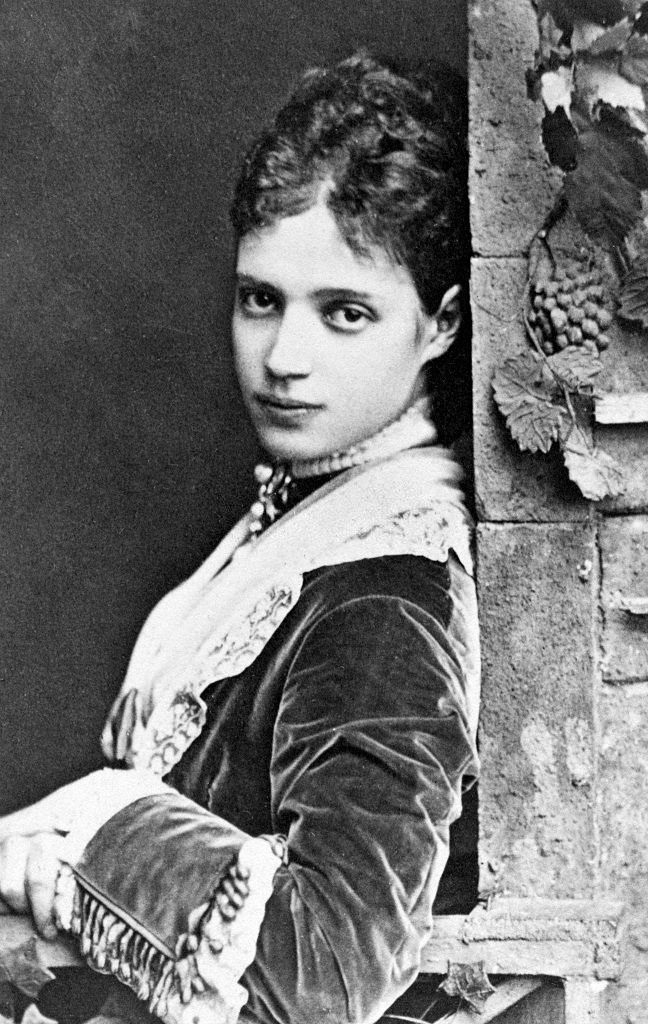
Tsesarevna Maria Feodorovna of Russia, 1870s

Dagmar was known for her beauty. Princess Mary Adelaide of Cambridge said that Dagmar was "sweetly pretty" and commented favorably on her "splendid dark eyes". Her fiancé Nicholas Alexandrovich, Tsesarevich of Russia was enthusiastic about her beauty. He wrote to his mother that "she is even prettier in real life than in the portraits that we had seen so far. Her eyes speak for her: they are so kind, intelligent, animated." When she was tsarevna, Thomas W. Knox met her at Grand Duke Vladimir Alexandrovich of Russia's wedding and wrote favorably about her beauty compared to that of the bride, Duchess Marie of Mecklenburg-Schwerin. He wrote that Dagmar was "less inclined to stoutness than the bride, she does not display such a plumpness of shoulder, and her neck rises more swan-like and gives fuller play to her finely formed head, with its curly hair and Grecian outline of face." He also commented favorably on "her keen, clear, and flashing eyes."

Dagmar was intelligent. When considering Dagmar for her second son, Prince Alfred, Queen Victoria judged that "Dagmar is cleverer [than her older sister, Alexandra]... she is a very nice girl." When she married, she was unable to speak any Russian. However, within a few years, she mastered the language and was so proficient that her husband wrote to her in Russian. She told an American minister to Russia that "the Russian language is full of power and beauty, it equals the Italian in music, the English in vigorous power and copiousness." She claimed that "for compactness of expression", Russian rivaled "Latin, and for the making of new words is equal to the Greek."

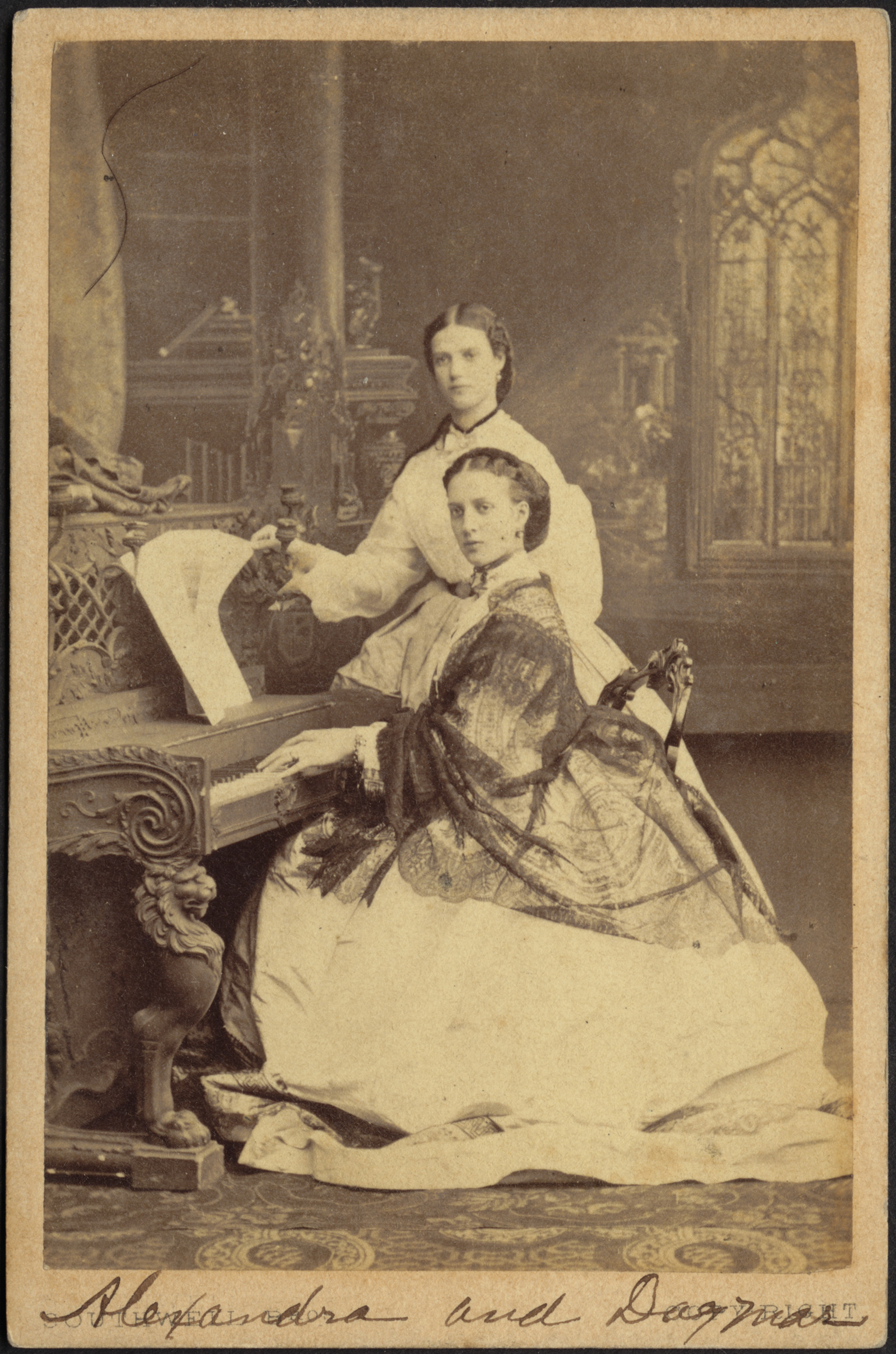
Alexandra and Dagmar, ca. 1859-1870; from the 19th Century American Trade Cards collection of the Boston Public Library

Dagmar was very fashionable. John Logan, a visitor to Russia, described her as "the best dressed woman in Europe". He claimed that Empress Elisabeth of Austria "excelled her in beauty" but that "no one touched" her "in frocks". Charles Frederick Worth, a Parisian couturier, greatly admired her style. He said, "Bring to me any woman in Europe-- queen, artiste, or bourgeoise-- who can inspire me as does Madame Her Majesty, and I will make her confections while I live and charge her nothing."

Dagmar was very charming and likable. After meeting her, Thomas W. Knox wrote, "No wonder the emperor likes her, and no wonder the Russians like her. I like her, and I am neither emperor nor any other Russian, and never exchanged a thousand words with her in my life." Maria von Bock, the daughter of Pyotr Stolypin, wrote, "kind, amiable, simple in her discourse, Maria Feodorovna was an Empress from head to toe, combining an inborn majesty with such goodness that she was idolized by all who knew her." Meriel Buchanan wrote that she possessed a "gracious and delightful charm of manner." Andrew Dickson White, the U.S. minister to Russia, said that she was "graceful, with a most kindly face and manner" and that she was "in every way cordial and kindly." Nadine Wonar-Larsky, her lady-in-waiting, noted that "her smile cheered everyone and her gracious manner always suggested a touch of personal feeling which went straight to the hearts of her subjects. She also possessed that priceless royal gift of never forgetting a face or name."

== Early life ==
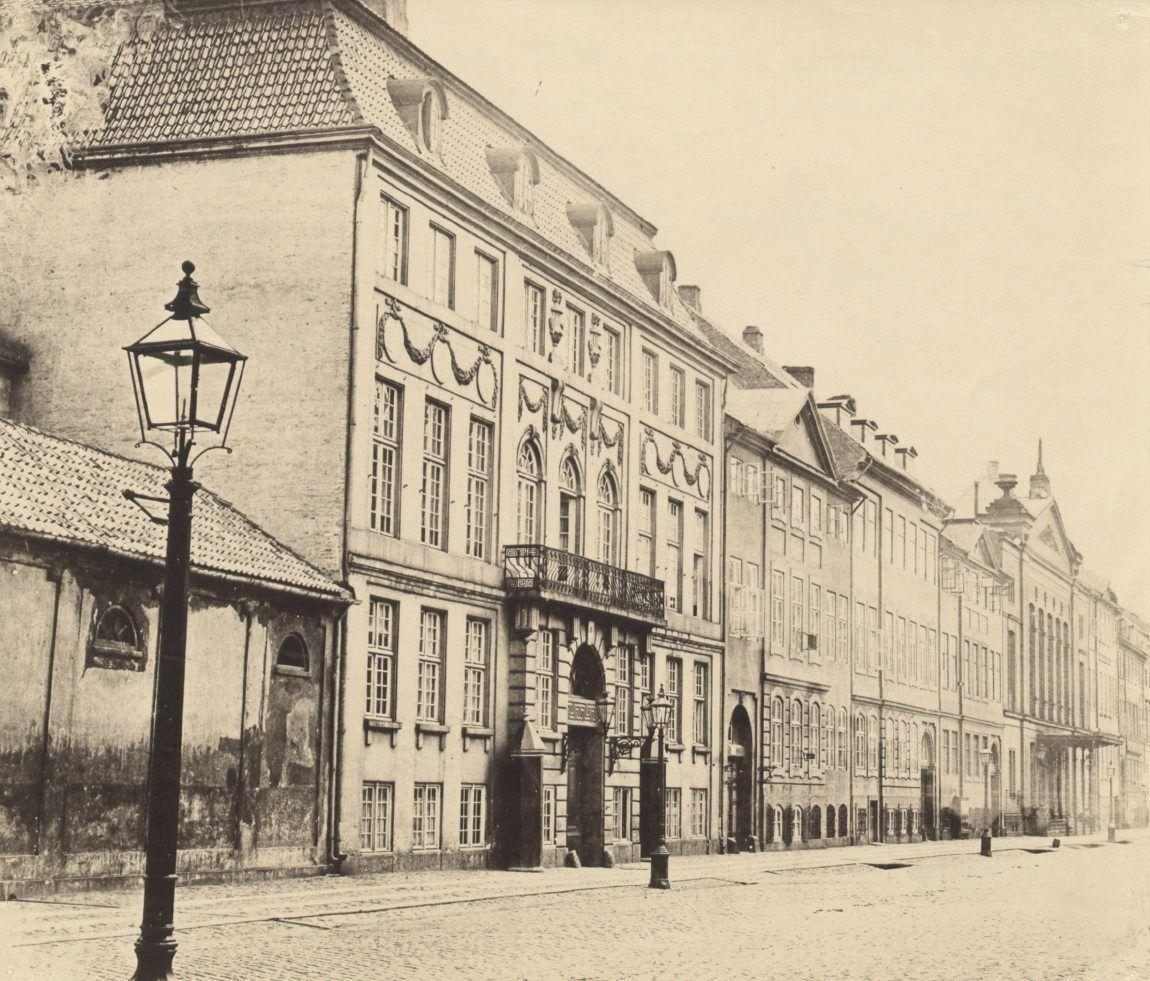
Dagmar's birthplace and childhood home, the Yellow Mansion in Copenhagen

Princess Marie Sophie Frederikke Dagmar of Schleswig-Holstein-Sonderburg-Glücksburg was born on 26 November 1847 at her parents' residence in the Yellow Mansion, an 18th-century town house at 18 Amaliegade, which is located immediately adjacent to the Amalienborg Palace complex, the principal residence of the Danish royal family in the district of Frederiksstaden in central Copenhagen. She was the fourth child and second daughter of the then Prince Christian of Schleswig-Holstein-Sonderburg-Glücksburg, a member of a princely cadet line, and his wife Princess Louise of Hesse-Kassel. She was baptised as a Lutheran in the Yellow Mansion with Queen Caroline Amalie of Denmark as her Godmother, and named after her kinswoman Marie Sophie Frederikke of Hesse-Kassel, Queen Dowager of Denmark, as well as the popular medieval Danish queen, Dagmar of Bohemia, in accordance with the national romantic fashion of the time. Growing up, she was known by the name Dagmar. Most of her adult life, however, she was known as Maria Feodorovna, the name which she took when she converted to Orthodoxy immediately before her 1866 marriage to the future Emperor Alexander III. Within her family, she was known as "Minnie" throughout her life.

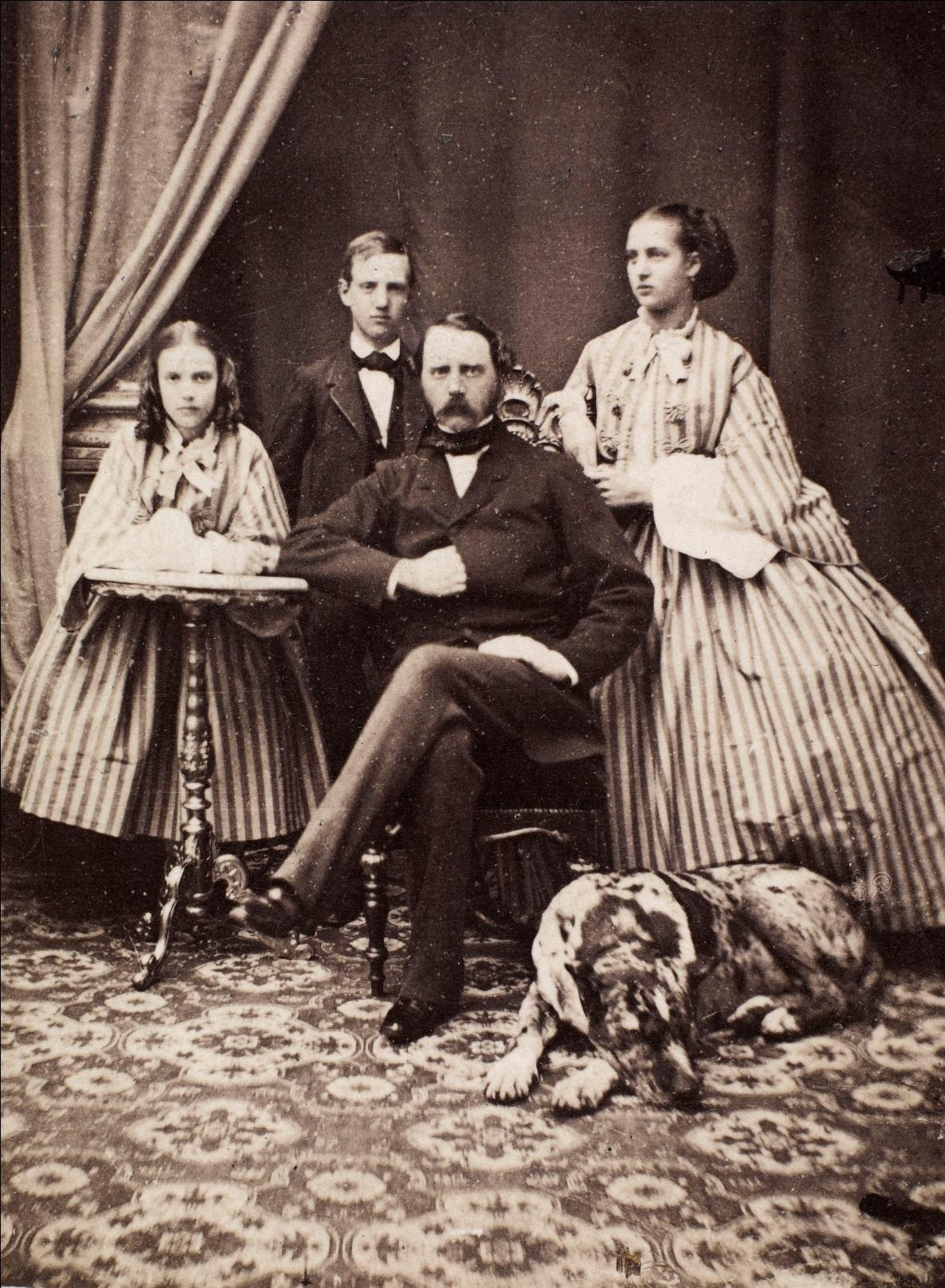
Princess Dagmar, Prince Vilhelm, Christian IX of Denmark and Princess Alexandra in 1861

In 1852 Dagmar's father became heir-presumptive to the throne of Denmark, largely due to the succession rights of his wife Louise as niece of King Christian VIII. In 1853, he was given the title Prince of Denmark and he and his family were given an official summer residence, Bernstorff Palace, north of Copenhagen. It quickly became Princess Louise's favorite residence, and the family often stayed there. The children grew up within a close-knit family, in what is described as a humble but happy environment. During the children's childhood, the father only had his officer salary to live on, and the family lived a relatively simple life according to royal norms. Their household only had six employees, and Dagmar and her siblings were allowed to walk around the streets of Copenhagen during their childhood and do such things as go to the market and visit cafes. Only very rarely did they take part in ceremonial functions and then immediately had to take off their fine clothes again so as not to risk getting them dirty. Dagmar's parents emphasized giving the children a simple civic upbringing that placed great emphasis on royal duties. Later, all the children became known for their effortless ability to interact with people, their sense of duty and ability to represent.

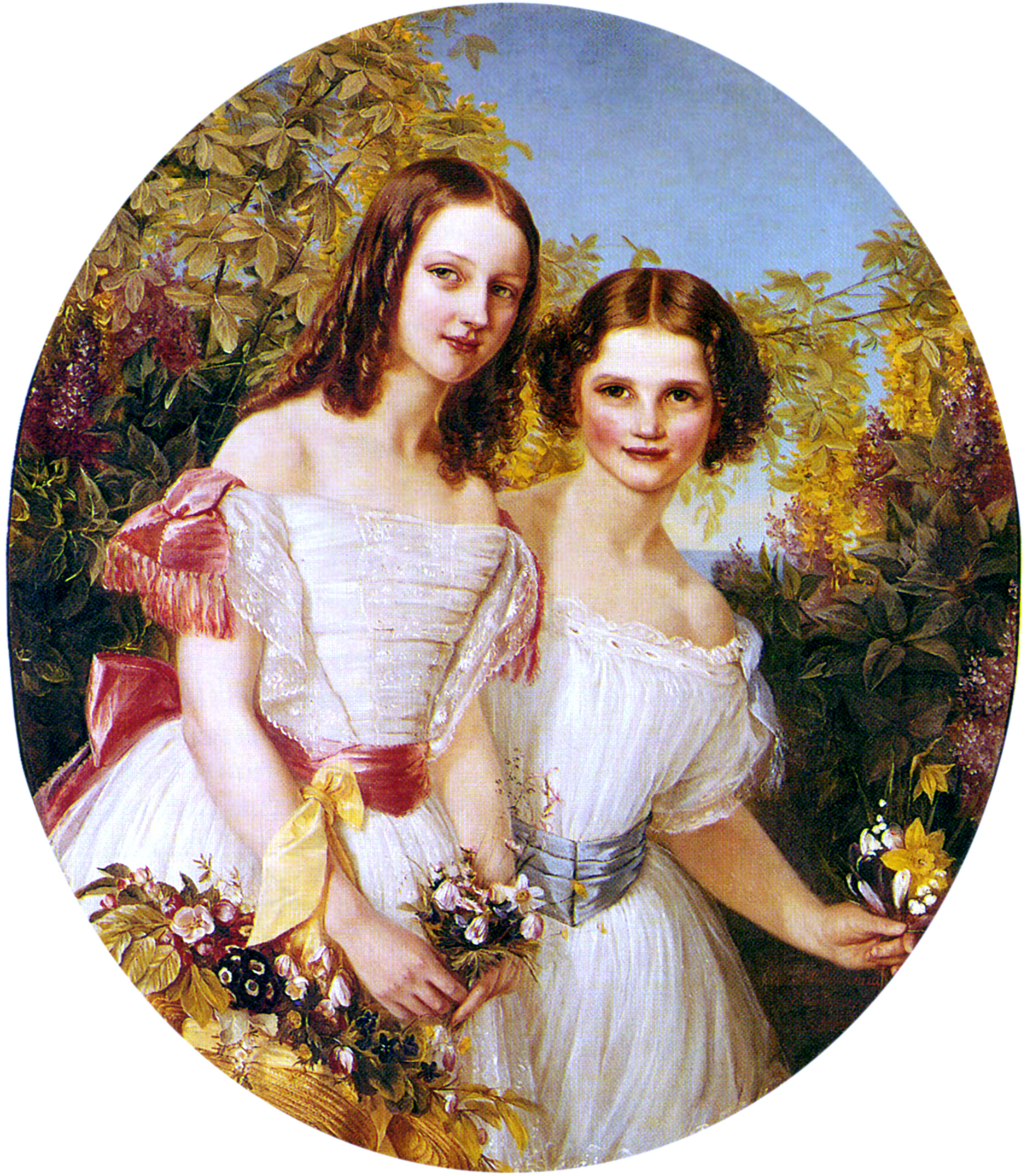
Portrait of Princesses Alexandra and Dagmar by Elisabeth Jerichau Baumann (1856)

Dagmar was closest to her eldest sister, Alexandra, and they maintained a strong connection to each other all their lives. The two princesses shared a room in the Yellow Mansion and were raised together. The sisters received the same education deemed appropriate for upper-class girls: they were taught housekeeping by their mother, and learned to dance, play music, paint and draw, and speak French, English, and German by tutors. However, the father also insisted that they learn gymnastics and sports, which was more unusual for girls. During their upbringing, Dagmar and Alexandra were given swimming lessons by the Swedish pioneer of swimming for women, Nancy Edberg; she would later welcome Edberg to Russia, where she came on royal scholarship to hold swimming lessons for women. Dagmar is described as lively and intelligent, sweet but less beautiful than Alexandra, and better at painting and drawing than her sisters, who, on the other hand, were more talented in music.

Upon the death of King Frederick VII in 1863, Dagmar's father became King of Denmark, as she turned 16 years old. Due to the brilliant marital alliances of his children, he became known as the "Father-in-law of Europe". Dagmar's eldest brother would succeed his father as King Frederik VIII of Denmark (one of whose sons would be elected as King of Norway). Her elder, and favourite, sister, Alexandra married Albert Edward, Prince of Wales (the future King Edward VII) in March 1863. Alexandra, along with being queen consort of King Edward VII, was also mother of George V of the United Kingdom, which helps to explain the striking resemblance between their sons Nicholas II and George V. Within months of Alexandra's marriage, Dagmar's second older brother, Vilhelm, was elected as King George I of Greece. Her younger sister was Thyra, Duchess of Cumberland. She also had a younger brother, Valdemar.

== Engagements and marriage ==
=== First engagement ===
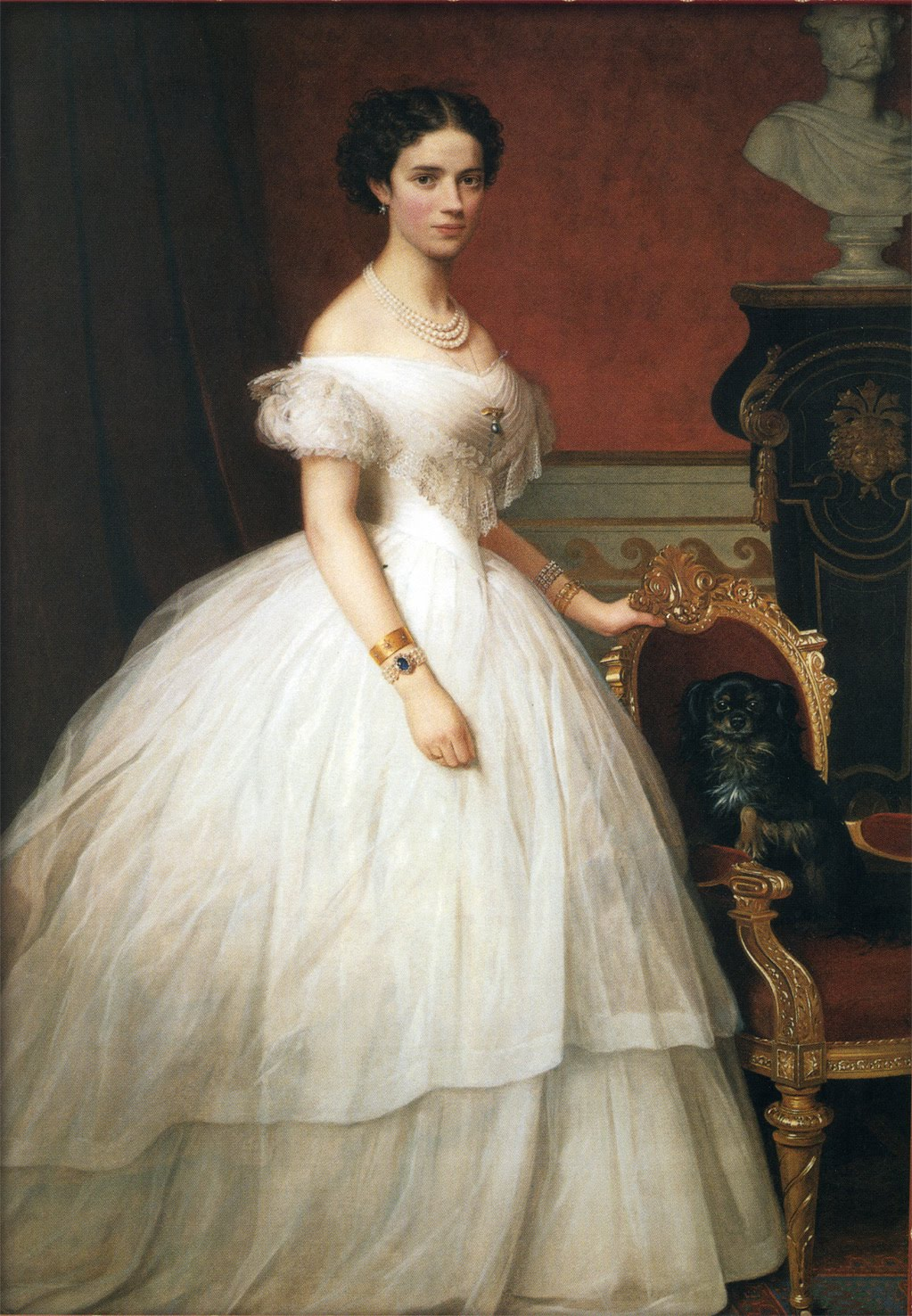
Portrait of a young Princess Dagmar with her dog in the 1860s by Andreas Herman Hunæus

At the end of 1863, as the daughter and sister of the kings of Denmark and Greece and sister-in-law of the Prince of Wales, Dagmar was now considered one of Europe's most coveted princesses. She received a proposal from Crown Prince Umberto of Italy, but was reluctant to marry him because she found him unattractive. Her mother was also reluctant to support such a marriage as she saw a greater status in the prospect of Dagmar marrying into the Russian imperial family. Due to the rise of Slavophile ideology in the Russian Empire, Alexander II of Russia searched for a bride for the heir apparent, Nicholas Alexandrovich, Tsesarevich of Russia, in countries other than the German states that had traditionally provided consorts for the tsars. Princess Dagmar was one of the candidates, and as early as 1860 the emperor had made his first inquiries about a possible engagement. There were also already family ties between the two families, as Dagmar's uncle had been married to the emperor's sister.

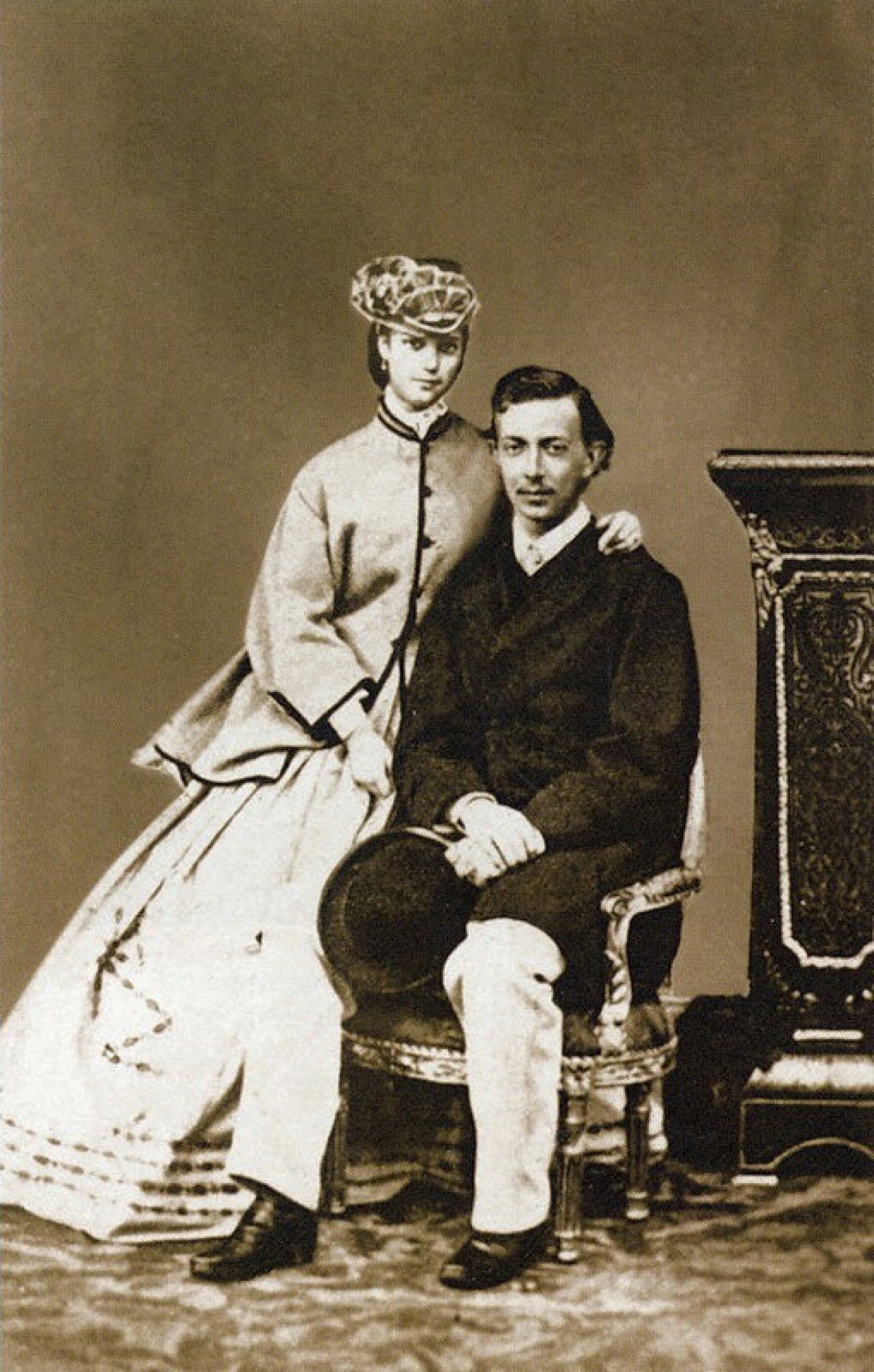
Princess Dagmar and her first fiancé Tsarevich Nicholas, 1864

In 1864, the Russian Empress Maria Alexandrovna announced that her son would visit Denmark, and during the summer Nicholas, or "Nixa" as he was known in his family, arrived at Fredensborg Palace, where the Danish royal family was staying. Nicholas had never met Dagmar, but had for a number of years collected photographs of her, and both families wanted the marriage. When they met, Dagmar and Nicholas were mutually attracted, and Nicholas wrote to his mother:

I came here as if in a fever (...) I can not describe to you what came over me, when we approached Fredenborg and I finally saw the sweet Dagmar. How can I describe it? She is so beautiful, direct, intelligent, experienced, and yet shy at the same time. She is even more beautiful in reality than in the pictures we have seen so far.

After returning to Russia to obtain his father's permission, Nicholas proposed to Dagmar on 28 September 1864 in the Bernstorff Palace Gardens and received a yes. The engagement was announced at Bernstorff Palace later the same day. Her future mother-in-law Maria Alexandrovna (Marie of Hesse) gave her a six-strand pearl necklace and Nicholas gave her a diamond bracelet. In total, the betrothal gifts Dagmar received from her future in-laws cost 1.5 million rubles.

The engagement was popular in both countries and at the same time ensured the Danish royal family even better connections. The engagement took place right during the Second Schleswig War between Denmark on one side and Prussia and Austria on the other, and during the peace negotiations after the war in October 1864, Dagmar unsuccessfully asked her future father-in-law to help Denmark against Prussia over the disputed territory of Schleswig-Holstein. In a letter, she asked Alexander II of Russia: "Use your power to mitigate the terrible conditions which the Germans have brutally forced Papa to accept... the sad plight of my fatherland, which makes my heart heavy, has inspired me to turn to you." It is believed that she did it with the consent of her parents, but it is not known if it was at their request. Her appeal was in vain, but from that moment on she became known for her anti-Prussian views.

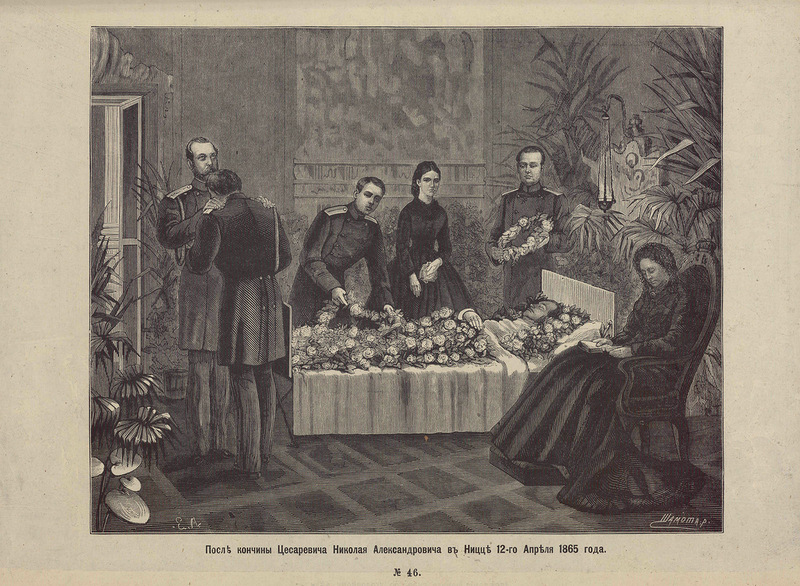
Deathbed of Tsarevich Nicholas

As Nicholas continued on his journey to Florence, Dagmar and Nicholas exchanged daily love letters for months. When he grew ill, Nicholas sent fewer letters and Dagmar teasingly asked him if he had fallen in love with "a dark-eyed Italian". In April, Nicholas grew gravely ill with cerebrospinal meningitis. Alexander II of Russia sent a telegram to Dagmar: "Nicholas has received the Last Rites. Pray for us and come if you can." On 22 April 1865, Nicholas died in the presence of his parents, brothers, and Dagmar. His last wish was that Dagmar would marry his younger brother, the future Alexander III.

Dagmar was devastated by Nicholas' death. Nicholas' parents struggled to "pull Princess Dagmar away from the corpse and carry her out." She was so heartbroken when she returned to her homeland that her relatives were seriously worried about her health. She had already become emotionally attached to Russia and often thought of the huge, remote country that was to have been her home. Many were sympathetic towards Dagmar. Princess Mary Adelaide of Cambridge wrote of "poor dear Minny's sorrow and the blight which has fallen upon her young life." Queen Victoria wrote "how terrible for poor Dagmar... the poor parents and bride are most deeply to be pitied."

=== Second engagement and wedding ===
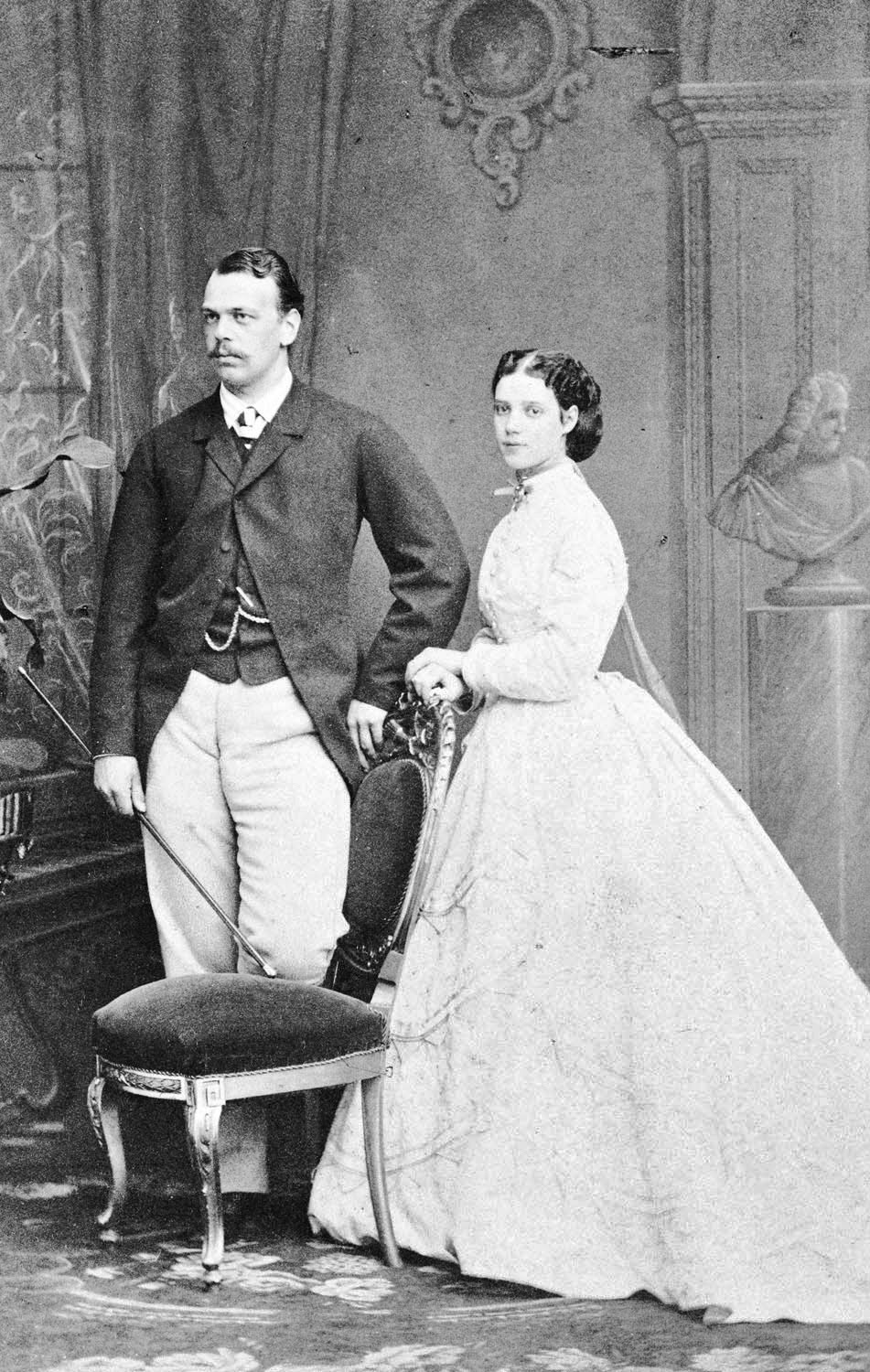
Princess Dagmar and her second fiancé, Tsarevich Alexander

Alexander II of Russia and Maria Alexandrovna had grown fond of Dagmar, and they wanted her to marry their new heir, Tsarevich Alexander. In an affectionate letter, Alexander II told Dagmar that he hoped she would still consider herself a member of their family. Maria Alexandrovna tried to convince Louise of Hesse-Kassel to send Dagmar to Russia immediately, but Louise insisted that Dagmar must "strengthen her nerves... [and] avoid emotional upsets." Dagmar, who sincerely mourned Nicholas, and Alexander, who was in love with his mother's lady-in-waiting Maria Meshcherskaya and attempted to renounce his place as heir to the throne in order to marry her, were both initially reluctant. However, under pressure from his parents, Alexander decided to go to Denmark.

In June 1866, Tsarevich Alexander arrived in Copenhagen with his brothers Grand Duke Vladimir and Grand Duke Alexei. While looking over photographs of Nicholas, Alexander asked Dagmar if "she could love him after having loved Nixa, to whom they were both devoted." She answered that she could love no one but him, because he had been so close to his brother. Alexander recalled that "we both burst into tears... [and] I told her that my dear Nixa helped us much in this situation and that now of course he prays about our happiness." On 17 June, he proposed to her during a picnic to the beach at Hellebæk by the coast of the Øresund strait near Elsinore and received a yes. The engagement was announced on 23 June at Fredensborg Palace. Both Dagmar and Alexander quickly embraced the prospect of marrying each other, and were soon described as genuinely enthusiastic.

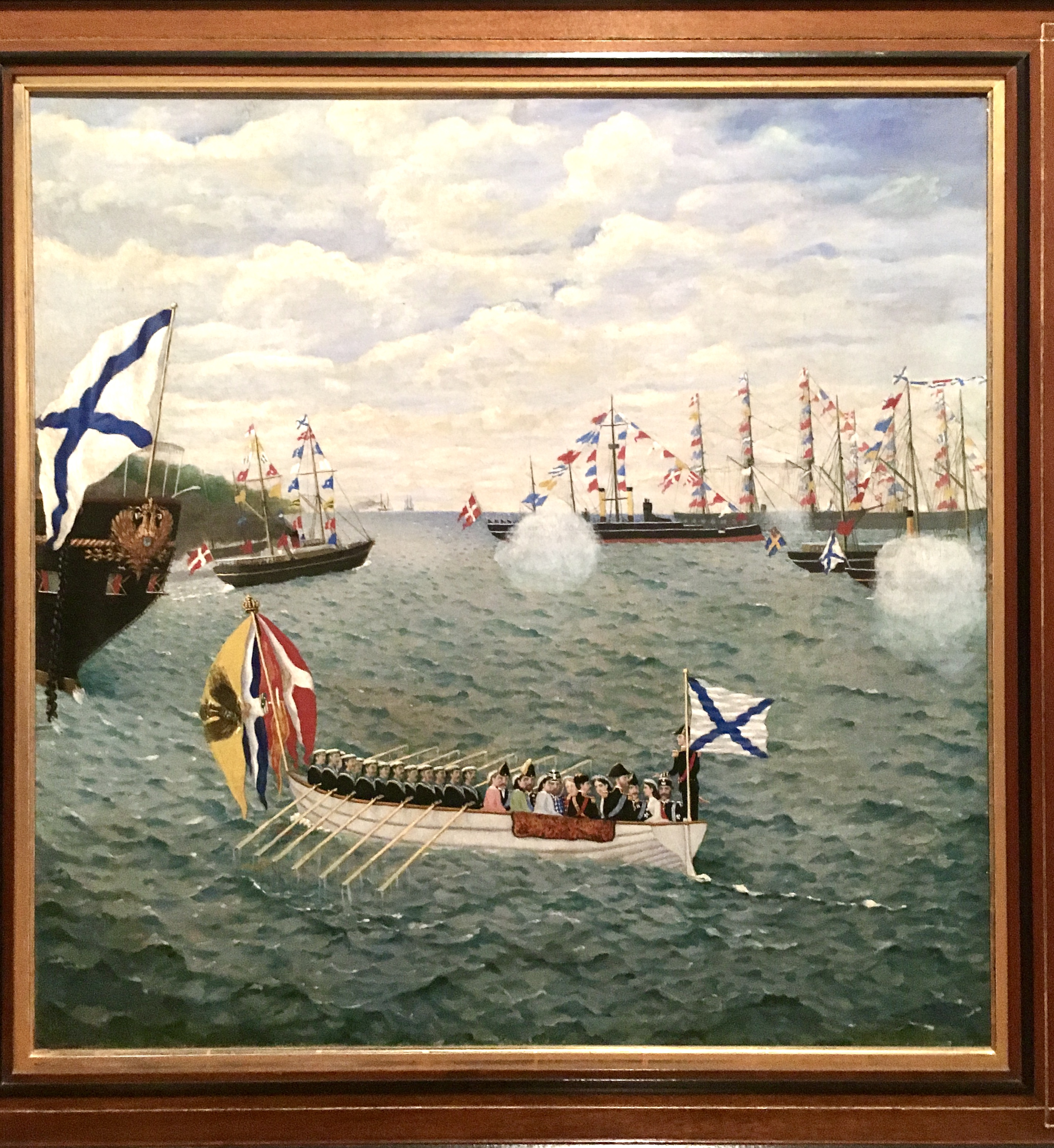
Wedding delegation in the Danish harbour, 1866

In the time leading up to Dagmar's departure to Russia, many festive events took place in Copenhagen, On 22 September 1866, Dagmar left Copenhagen on board the Danish royal yacht Slesvig escorted by the armoured frigate Peder Skram, and accompanied by her brother, Crown Prince Frederik. Hans Christian Andersen, who had occasionally been invited to tell stories to Dagmar and her siblings when they were children, was among the crowd which flocked to the quay in order to see her off. The writer remarked in his diary, "Yesterday, at the quay, while passing me by, she stopped and took me by the hand. My eyes were full of tears. What a poor child! Oh Lord, be kind and merciful to her! They say that there is a brilliant court in Saint Petersburg and the tsar's family is nice; still, she heads for an unfamiliar country, where people are different and religion is different and where she will have none of her former acquaintances by her side."

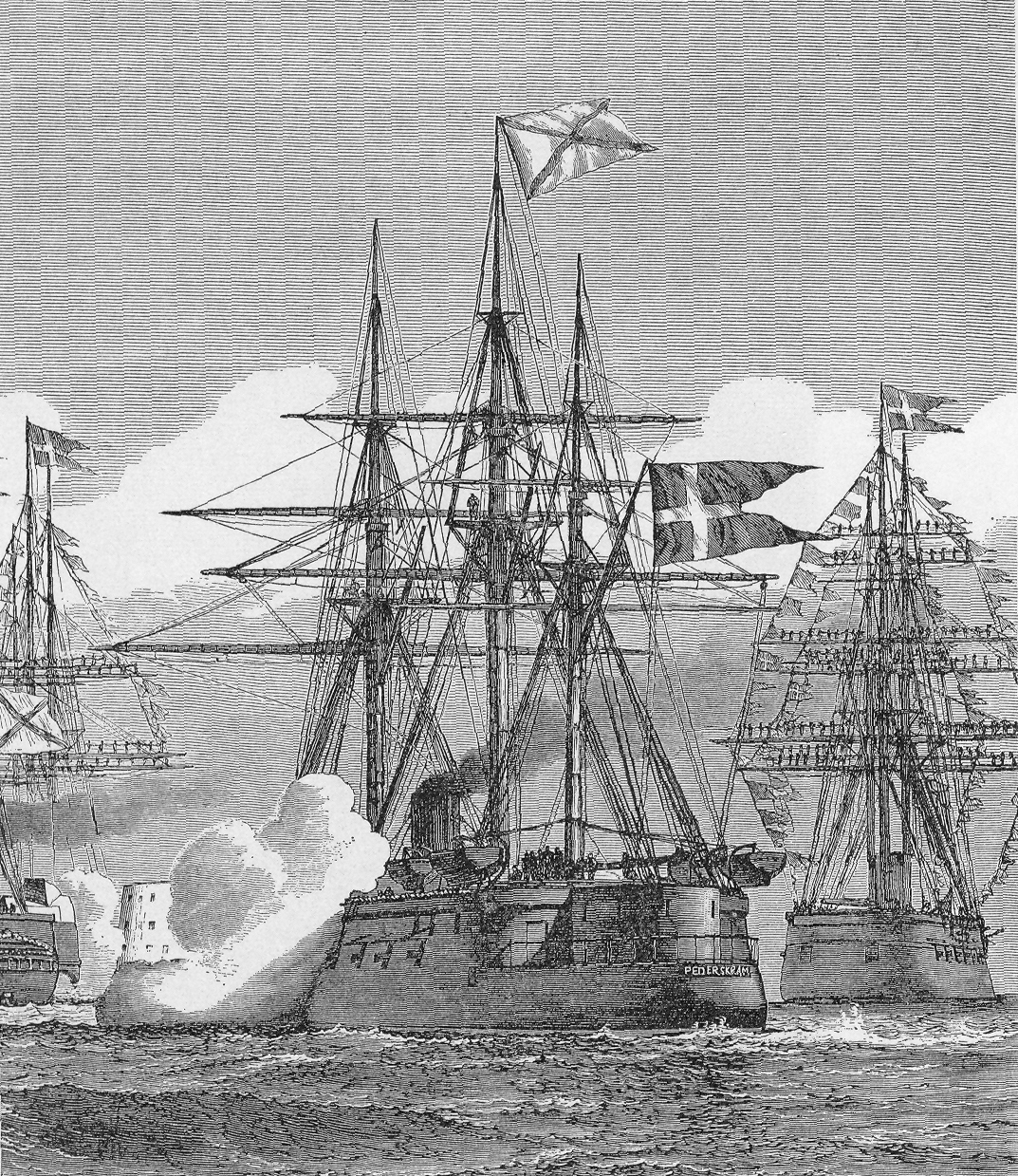
Danish armoured frigate Peder Skram, which escorted Princess Dagmar to Russia, shown here at Kronstadt in September 1866

Dagmar was warmly welcomed in Kronstadt by the emperor's brother Grand Duke Konstantin Nikolayevich of Russia and escorted to St. Petersburg, where she was greeted by her future mother-in-law and sister-in-law on 24 September. The weather on this September day was almost summery with temperatures of more than 20 °C (68 °F), which was noted by the poet Fyodor Ivanovich Tyutchev in the welcome poem dedicated to the arrival of the princess: The sky is light blue... On the 29th, she made her formal entry in to the Russian capital dressed in a Russian national costume in blue and gold and traveled with the Empress to the Winter Palace where she was introduced to the Russian public on a balcony. Catherine Radziwill described the occasion: "rarely has a foreign princess been greeted with such enthusiasm… from the moment she set foot on Russian soil, succeeded in winning to herself all hearts. Her smile, the delightful way she had of bowing to the crowds…, laid immediately the foundation of …popularity"

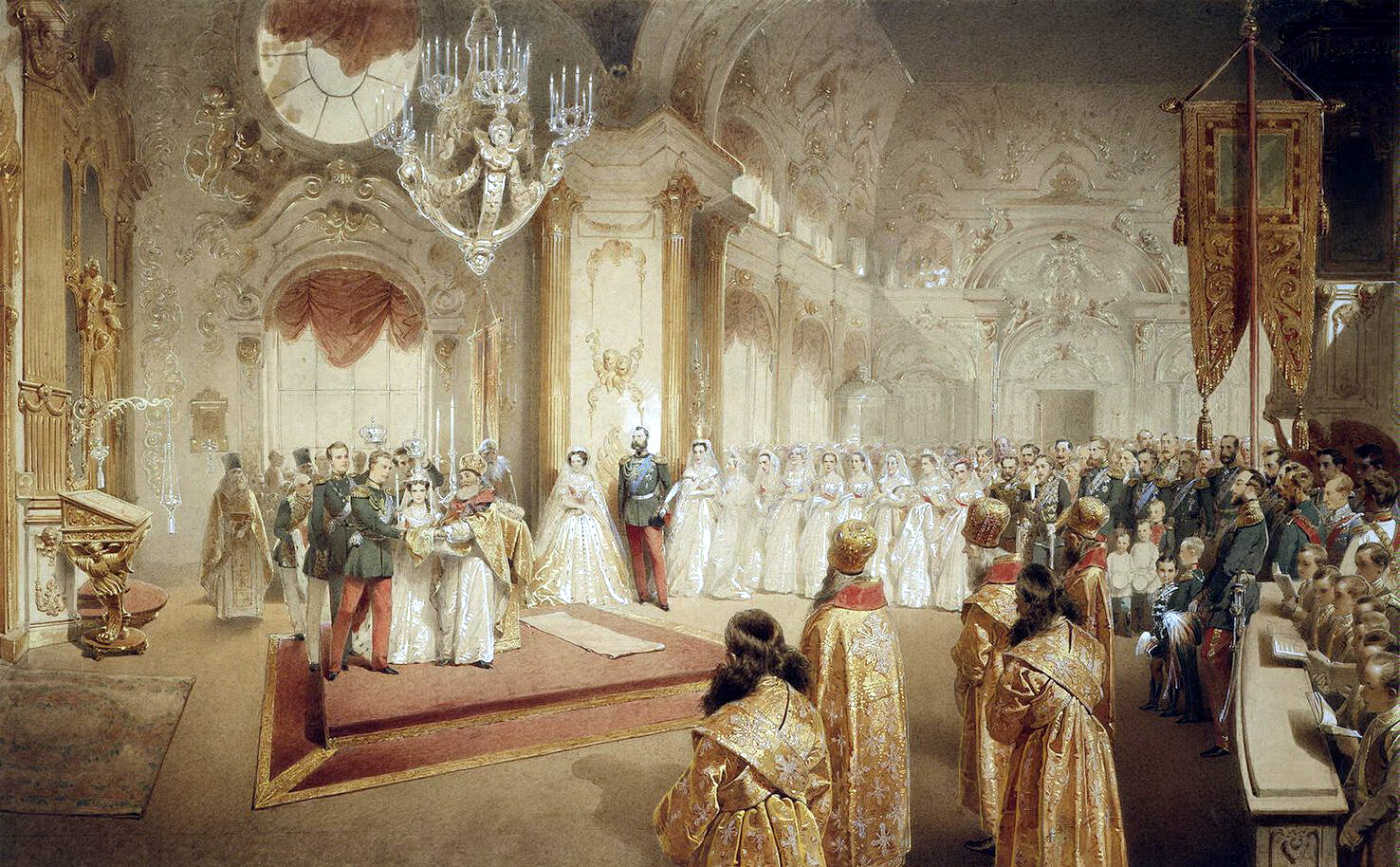
Wedding of Alexander and Maria Feodorovna in 1866, by Mihály Zichy (1867)

In the following weeks, Dagmar was educated in Russian court etiquette. She converted to Orthodoxy on 24 October [O.S. 12 October] 1866 and became Grand Duchess Maria Feodorovna of Russia the following day. However, at the Russian court, where French was practically the first language, she was often called "Marie". The lavish wedding took place on 9 November [O.S. 28 October] 1866 in the Imperial Chapel of the Winter Palace in Saint Petersburg. Financial constraints had prevented her parents from attending the wedding, and in their stead, they sent her brother, Crown Prince Frederick. Her brother-in-law, the Prince of Wales, had also travelled to Saint Petersburg for the ceremony; pregnancy had prevented the Princess of Wales from attending. After the wedding night, Alexander wrote in his diary, "I took off my slippers and my silver embroidered robe and felt the body of my beloved next to mine... How I felt then, I do not wish to describe here. Afterwards we talked for a long time."

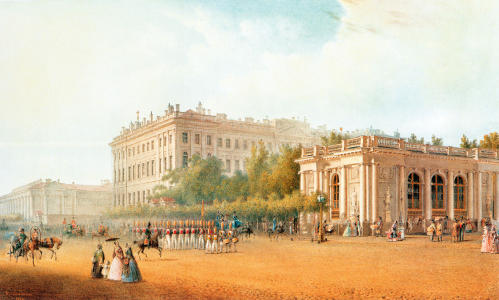
The Anichkov Palace in 1862

After the many wedding parties were over the newlyweds moved into the Anichkov Palace in Saint Petersburg where they were to live for the next 15 years, when they were not taking extended holidays at their summer villa Livadia in the Crimean Peninsula. Despite the fact that their relationship began under such strange circumstances, Maria and Alexander had an exceptionally happy marriage, and during almost thirty years of marriage, the spouses maintained a sincere devotion to each other. She was widely recognized as "the only person on the face of the earth in whom the Autocrat of all the Russias puts any real trust. In his gentle consort, he has unlimited confidence." Despite her anti-Russian sentiments, Queen Victoria wrote favorably about Maria and Alexander's marriage. She wrote that "[Maria] seems quite happy and contented with her fat, good-natured husband who seems far more attentive and kind to her than one would have thought....I think they are very domestic and happy and attached to each other; he makes a very good husband."

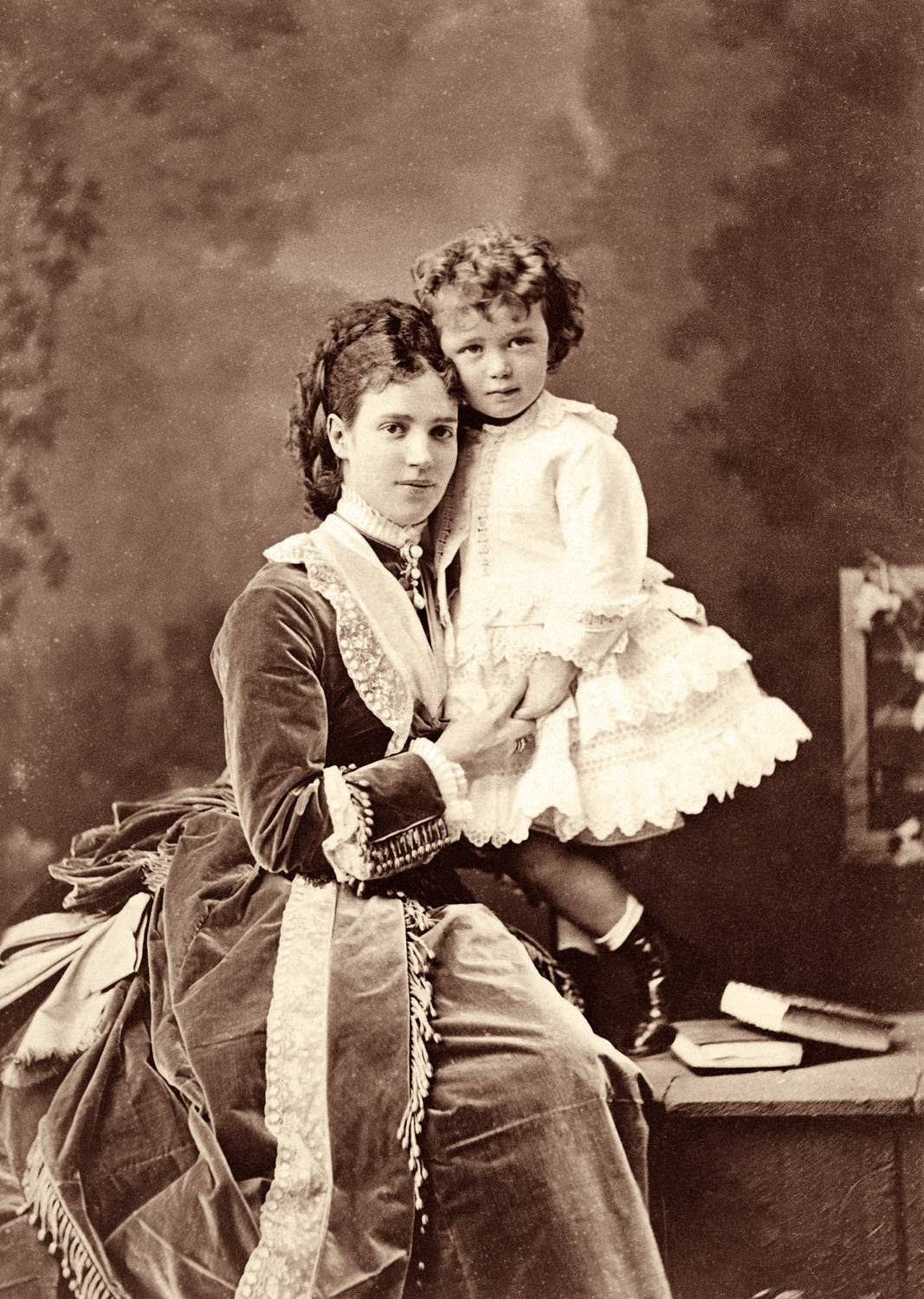
Maria Feodorovna with her son Grand Duke Nicholas, unbreeched at two years old in 1870

== Tsesarevna of Russia ==
On 18 May 1868, Maria gave birth to their eldest child, Nicholas, the future Nicholas II, at the Alexander Palace in Tsarskoye Selo south of Saint Petersburg. In his diary, the then Tsarevich Alexander recorded the momentous event of the birth of his first child,

Around 12.30 my wife came to the bedroom and lay down on a couch where everything was prepared. The pains became stronger and stronger, and Minny suffered very much. Papa ... helped me hold my darling the whole time. Finally, at 2.30, the last minute came and suddenly all her suffering stopped. God sent us a son whom we named Nicholas. What a joy it was! It is impossible to imagine. I sprang to embrace my darling wife, and she instantly became cheerful and was terribly happy. I had been weeping like a child but suddenly my heart became light and cheerful.

The entire imperial family was present at the birth of Alexander and Maria's first child. In a letter to her mother, Queen Louise, the Tsarevna wrote,

.. this bothered me immensely! The Emperor held me by one hand, my Sasha by the other, whilst every so often the Empress kissed me.

Her next son, Alexander, born in 1869, died from meningitis in infancy. She wrote to her mother, Queen Louise of Denmark: "The doctors maintain he did not suffer, but we suffered terribly to see and hear him." Maria would bear Alexander four more children who reached adulthood: George (b. 1871), Xenia (b. 1875), Michael (b. 1878), and Olga (b. 1882). As a mother, she doted on and was quite possessive of her sons. She had a more distant relationship with her daughters. Her favorite child was George, and Olga and Michael were closer to their father. She was lenient towards George, and she could never bear to punish him for his pranks. Her daughter Olga remembered that "mother had a great weakness for him."

The family often visited her many relatives across Europe. She spent periods of time in Greece, England, and Denmark, on trips with family to her various siblings. Her children thus became close friends with their first cousins, the children of the King of Greece, Prince of Wales (future King of Great Britain and Ireland), and Crown Prince of Denmark (future King of Denmark). Through these relationships, Maria arranged the marriage between her brother George I of Greece and her cousin-in-law Olga Constantinovna of Russia. When George visited St. Petersburg in 1867, she contrived to have George spend time with Olga. She convinced Olga's parents, her father Konstantin being wary of her young age, of the prospective groom's suitability. In a letter, her father Christian IX of Denmark praised her for her shrewd arranging of the marriage: "Where in the world have you, little rogue, ever learned to intrigue so well, since you have worked hard on your uncle and aunt, who were previously decidedly against a match of this kind."

Since her mother-in-law, Empress Maria Alexandrovna, was in fragile health and spent long periods abroad for health reasons, Maria Feodorovna often had to fulfill the role of first lady of the court. She did not have the best conditions to become popular in Russia, as most Russians disliked her having married Alexander after first having been engaged to his brother. However, she quickly overcame this obstacle, and became beloved by the Russian public, a popularity she never really lost. Early on, she made it a priority to learn the Russian language and to try to understand the Russian people. Baroness Editha von Rahden wrote that "the Czarevna is forming a real, warm sympathy for that country which is receiving her with so much enthusiasm." In 1876, she and her husband visited Helsinki and were greeted by cheers, most of which were "directed to the wife of the heir apparent."

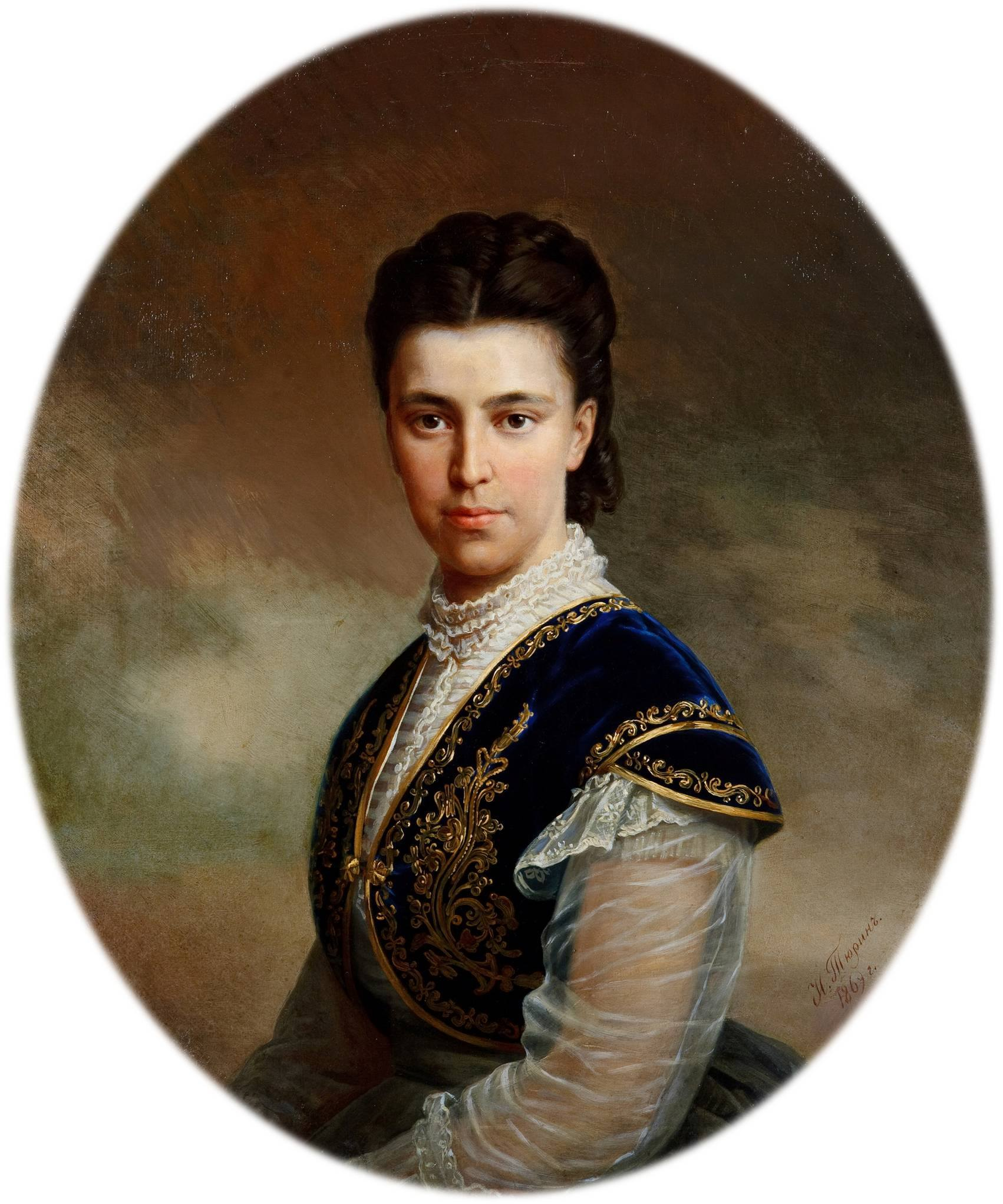
Maria Feodorovna by Ivan Tyurin (1869)

Maria rarely interfered with politics, preferring to devote her time and energies to her family, charities, and the more social side of her position. She had also seen the student protests of Kiev and St. Petersburg in the 1860s, and when police were beating students, the students cheered on Maria Feodorovna to which she replied, "They were quite loyal, they cheered me. Why do you allow the police to treat them so brutally?" Her one exception to official politics was her militant anti-German sentiment because of the annexation of Danish territories by Prussia in 1864, a sentiment also expressed by her sister, Alexandra. Prince Gorchakov remarked about that policy that "it is our belief, that Germany will not forget that both in Russia and in England a Danish Princess has her foot on the steps of the throne".

In 1873, Maria, Alexander, and their two eldest sons made a journey to the United Kingdom. The imperial couple and their children were entertained at Marlborough House by the Prince and Princess of Wales. The royal sisters Maria and Alexandra delighted London society by dressing alike at social gatherings. The following year, Maria and Alexander welcomed the Prince and Princess of Wales to St. Petersburg; they had come for the wedding of the Prince's younger brother, Alfred, to Grand Duchess Maria Alexandrovna, daughter of Tsar Alexander II and the sister of the tsarevich.

Maria and her family were targeted in an assassination attempt on the Tsar in February 1880, but which saw the Imperial family survive through a failure to arrive on time for dinner. Maria's relationship with her father-in-law, Alexander II, deteriorated because she did not accept his second marriage to Catherine Dolgorukov. She refused to allow her children to visit their grandfather's second wife and his legitimized bastards, which caused Alexander's anger. She confided in Sophia Tolstaya that "there were grave scenes between me and the Sovereign, caused by my refusal to let my children to him." At a Winter Palace reception in February 1881, she refused to kiss Catherine and only gave Catherine her hand to kiss. Alexander II was furious and chastised his daughter-in-law: "Sasha is a good son, but you – you have no heart".

== Empress of Russia ==
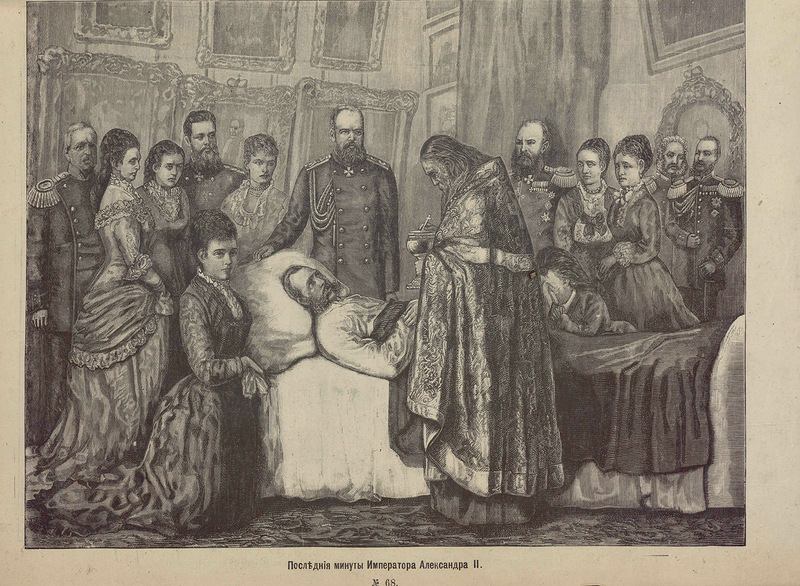
Later rendering of Maria Feodorovna kneeling at the deathbed of Alexander II

On the morning of 13 March 1881, Maria's father-in-law Alexander II of Russia was killed by a bomb attack carried out by the revolutionary socialist political organization Narodnaya Volya on his way back to the Winter Palace from a military parade. His leg was blown to pieces by the second of two bombs, and in her diary, Maria described how the wounded, still living Emperor was taken to the palace: "His legs were crushed terribly and ripped open to the knee; a bleeding mass, with half a boot on the right foot, and only the sole of the foot remaining on the left." Alexander II died of blood loss a few hours later. After her father-in-law's gruesome death, she was worried about her husband's safety. In her diary, she wrote, "Our happiest and serenest times are now over. My peace and calm are gone, for now I will only ever be able to worry about Sasha." Her favorite sister, the Princess of Wales, and brother-in-law Prince of Wales, stayed in Russia for several weeks after the funeral.

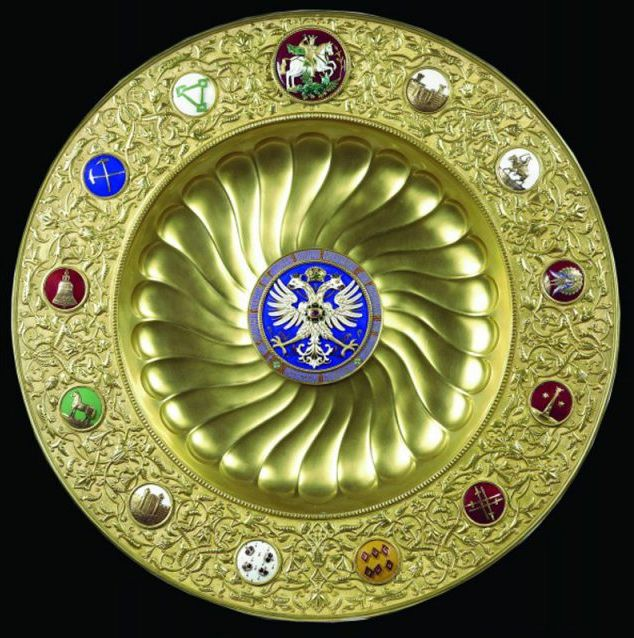
Silver-gilt plate, celebrating the coronation of Emperor Alexander Alexandrovich and Empress Maria Feodorovna, from the Khalili Collection of Enamels of the World

Alexander and Maria were crowned at the Assumption Cathedral in the Kremlin in Moscow on 27 May 1883. Just before the coronation, a major conspiracy had been uncovered, which cast a pall over the celebration. Nevertheless, over 8000 guests attended the splendid ceremony. Because of the many threats against Maria and Alexander III, the head of the security police, General Cherevin, shortly after the coronation urged the Tsar and his family to relocate to Gatchina Palace, a more secure location 50 kilometres outside St. Petersburg. The huge palace had 900 rooms and was built by Catherine the Great. The Romanovs heeded the advice. Maria and Alexander III lived at Gatchina for 13 years, and it was here that their five surviving children grew up. Under heavy guard, Alexander III and Maria made periodic trips from Gatchina to the capital to take part in official events, continuing to use the Anichkov Palace when staying there in preference to the Winter Palace.

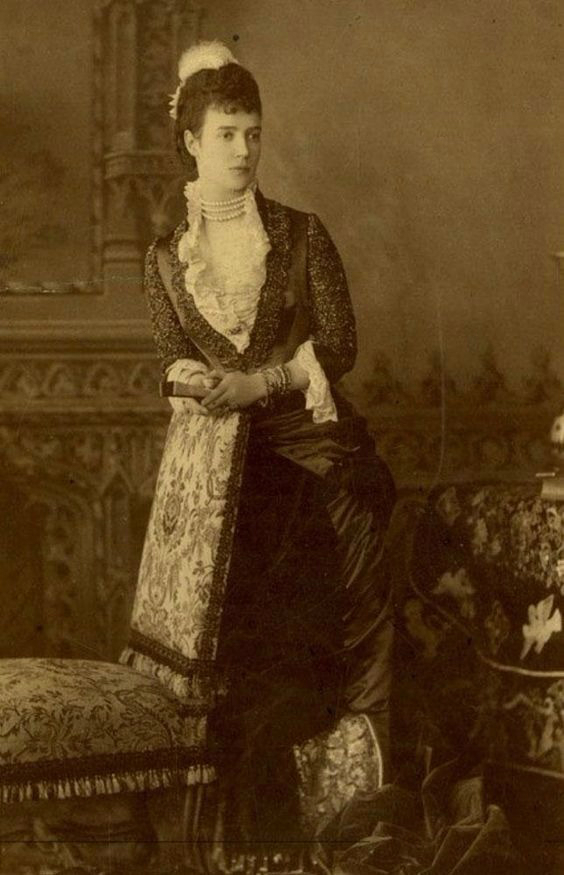
The Empress consort of All the Russias, 1880s

Duchess Cecilie of Mecklenburg-Schwerin wrote that Maria's "bearing, her distinguished and forceful personality, and the intelligence which shone in her face, made her the perfect figure of a queen... She was extraordinarily well-loved in Russia, and everyone had confidence in her... and [was] a real mother to her people."

Maria was active in philanthropic work. Her husband called her "the Guardian Angel of Russia". As Empress, she assumed patronage of the Marie Institutions that her mother-in-law had run: It encompassed 450 charitable establishments. In 1882, she founded many establishments called Marie schools to give young girls an elementary education. She was the patroness of the Russian Red Cross Society. During a cholera epidemic in the late 1870s, she visited the sick in hospitals.

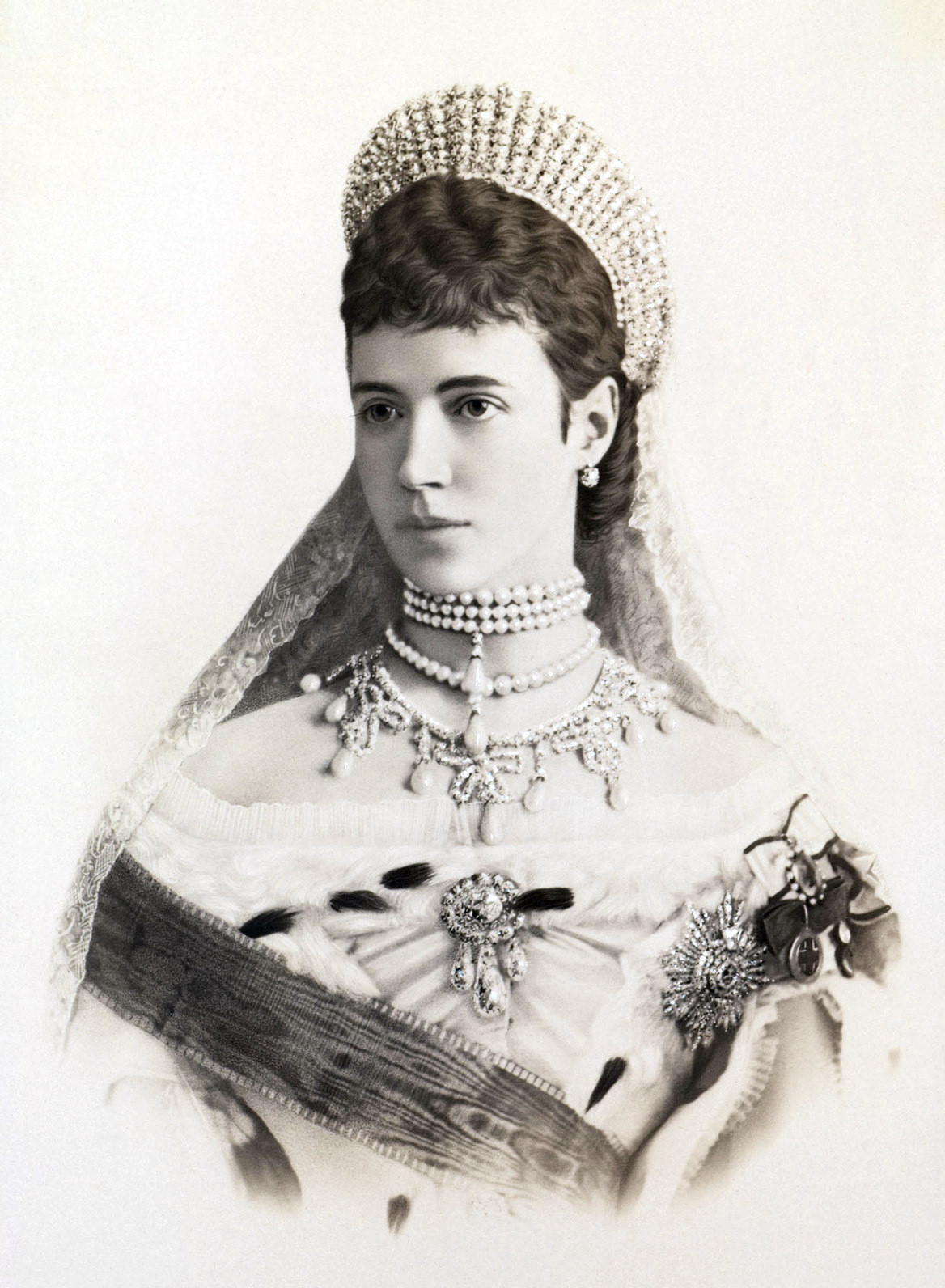
Empress Maria Feodorovna of Russia, circa 1885

Maria was the head of the social scene. She loved to dance at the balls of high society, and she became a popular socialite and hostess of the Imperial balls at Gatchina. Her daughter Olga commented, "Court life had to run in splendor, and there my mother played her part without a single false step". A contemporary remarked on her success: "of the long gallery of Tsarinas who have sat in state in the Kremlin or paced in the Winter Palace, Marie Feodorovna was perhaps the most brilliant". Alexander used to enjoy joining in with the musicians, although he would end up sending them off one by one. When that happened, Maria knew the party was over.

As tsarevna, and then as tsarina, Maria Feodorovna had something of a social rivalry with the popular Grand Duchess Marie Pavlovna, wife of her Russian brother-in-law, Grand Duke Vladimir. This rivalry had echoed the one shared by their husbands, and served to exacerbate the rift within the family. While she knew better than to publicly criticise both the Grand Duke and Duchess in public, Maria Feodorovna referred to Marie Pavlovna with the caustic epithet of "Empress Vladimir".

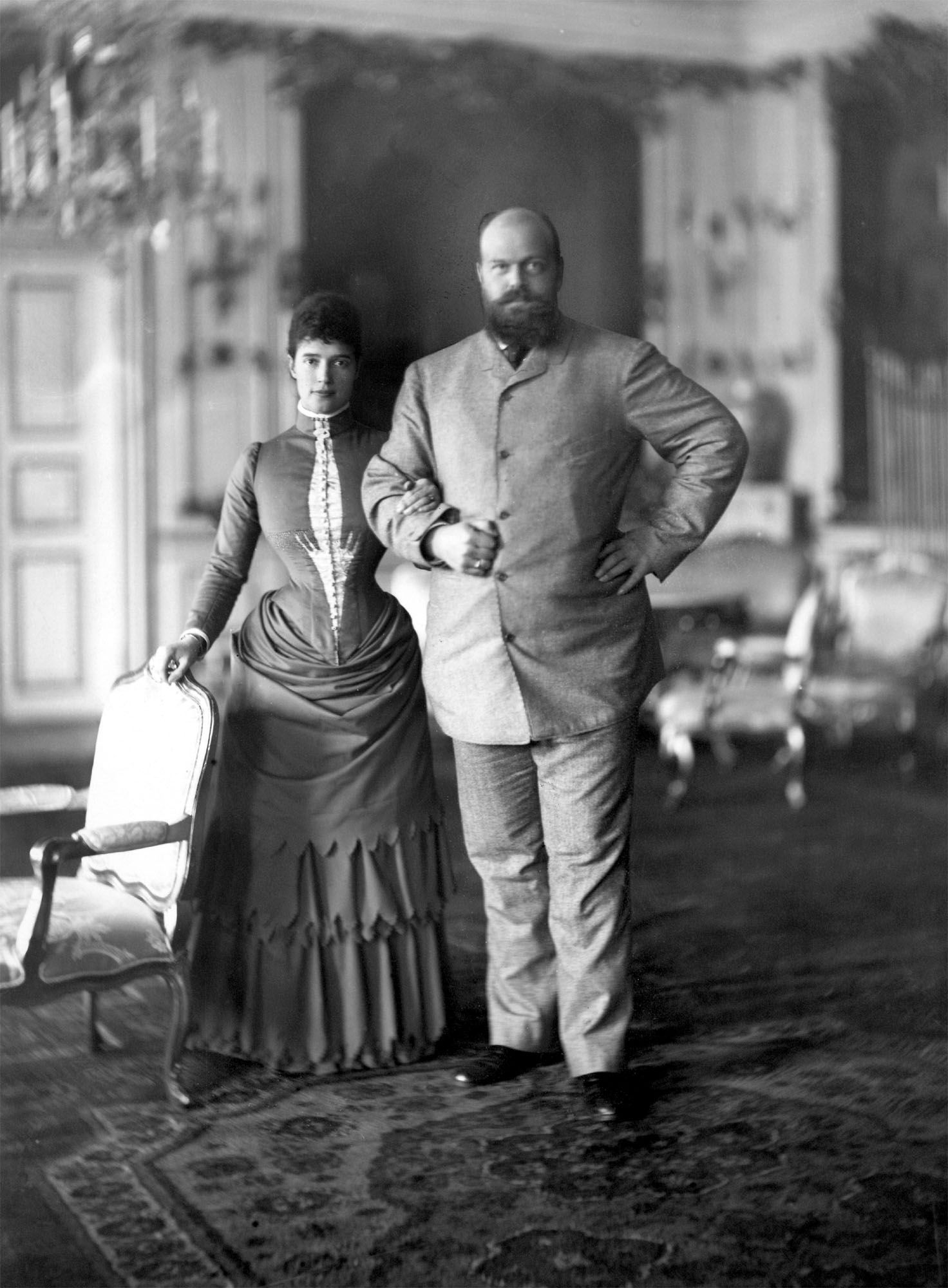
Empress Maria Feodorovna and her husband Tsar Alexander III in Denmark in 1893

Nearly each summer, Maria, Alexander and their children would make an annual trip to Denmark, where her parents, King Christian IX and Queen Louise, hosted family reunions. Maria's brother, King George I, and his wife, Queen Olga, would come up from Athens with their children, and the Princess of Wales, often without her husband, would come with some of her children from the United Kingdom. In contrast to the tight security observed in Russia, the tsar, tsarina and their children relished the relative freedom that they could enjoy at Bernstorff and Fredensborg. The annual family meetings of monarchs in Denmark was regarded as suspicious in Europe, where many assumed they secretly discussed state affairs. Otto von Bismarck nicknamed Fredensborg "Europe's Whispering Gallery" and accused Queen Louise of plotting against him with her children. Maria also had a good relationship with the majority of her in-laws, and was often asked to act as a mediator between them and the tsar. In the words of her daughter Olga: "She proved herself extremely tactful with her in-laws, which was no easy task".

During Alexander III's reign, the monarchy's opponents quickly disappeared underground. A group of students had been planning to assassinate Alexander III on the sixth anniversary of his father's death at the Peter and Paul Cathedral in St. Petersburg. The plotters had stuffed hollowed-out books with dynamite, which they intended to throw at the Tsar when he arrived at the cathedral. However, the Russian secret police uncovered the plot before it could be carried out. Five students were hanged in 1887; amongst them was Aleksandr Ulyanov, older brother of Vladimir Lenin.

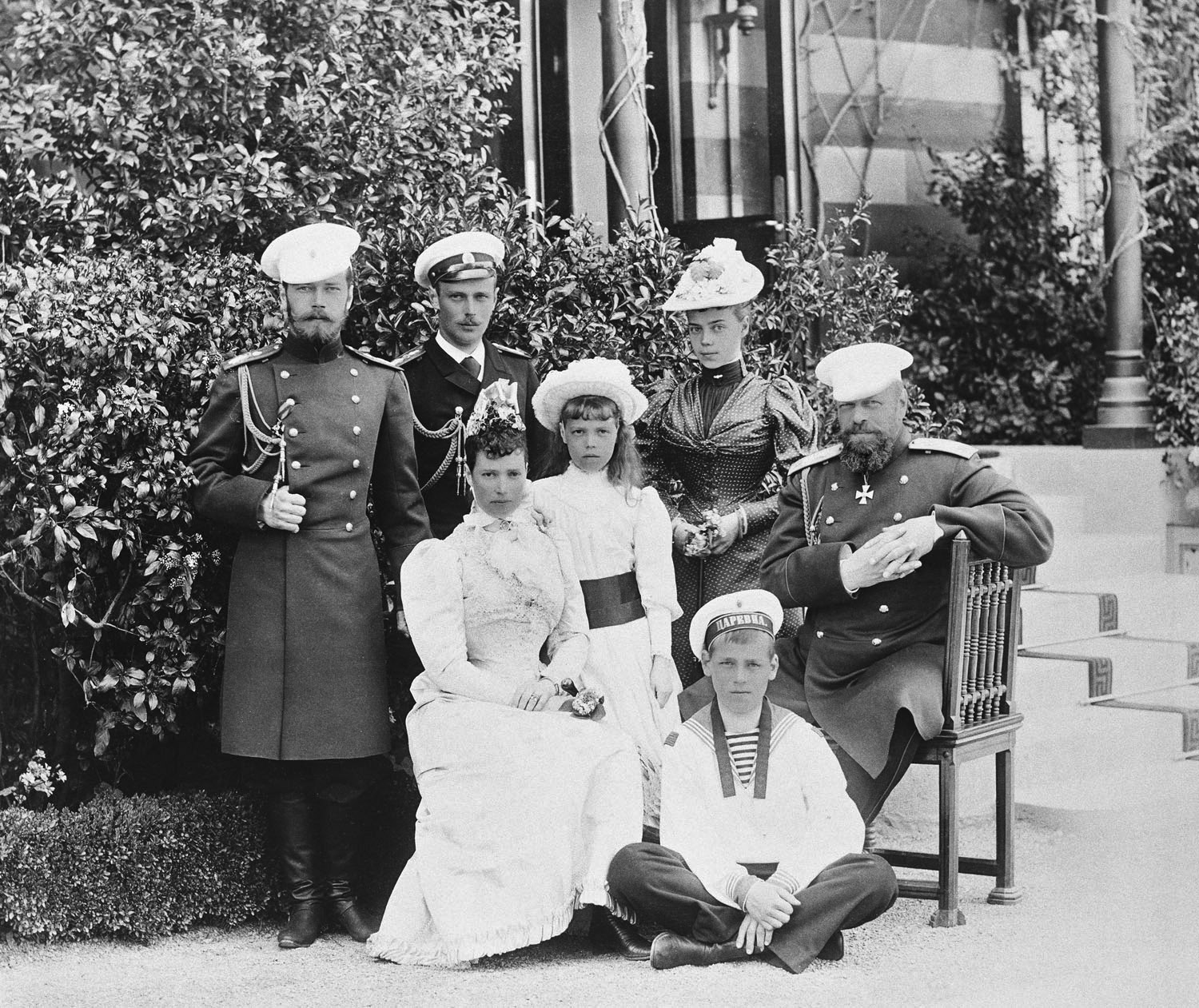
The Imperial family the year before Alexander III's death. From left to right: Tsarevich Nicholas, Grand Duke George, Empress Maria Feodorovna, Grand Duchess Olga, Grand Duchess Xenia, Grand Duke Michael, Emperor Alexander III, Livadia 1893

The biggest threat to the lives of the tsar and his family, however, came not from terrorists, but from a derailment of the imperial train in the fall of 1888. Maria and her family had been at lunch in the dining car when the train jumped the tracks and slid down an embankment, causing the roof of the dining car to nearly cave in on them.

When Maria's eldest sister Alexandra visited Gatchina in July 1894, she was surprised to see how weak her brother-in-law Alexander III had become. At the time Maria had long known that he was ill and did not have long left. She now turned her attention to her eldest son, the future Nicholas II, for it was on him that both her personal future and the future of the dynasty now depended.

Nicholas had long had his heart set on marrying Princess Alix of Hesse and by Rhine, a favourite grandchild of Queen Victoria. Despite the fact that she was their godchild, neither Alexander III nor Maria approved of the match. Nicholas summed up the situation as follows: "I wish to move in one direction, and it is clear that Mama wishes me to move in another – my dream is to one day marry Alix." Maria and Alexander found Alix shy and somewhat peculiar. They were also concerned that the young Princess was not possessed of the right character to be Empress of Russia. Nicholas's parents had known Alix as a child and formed the impression that she was hysterical and unbalanced, which may have been due to the loss of her mother and youngest sister, Marie, to diphtheria when she was just six. It was only when Alexander III's health was beginning to fail that they reluctantly gave permission for Nicholas to propose.

== Empress Dowager ==
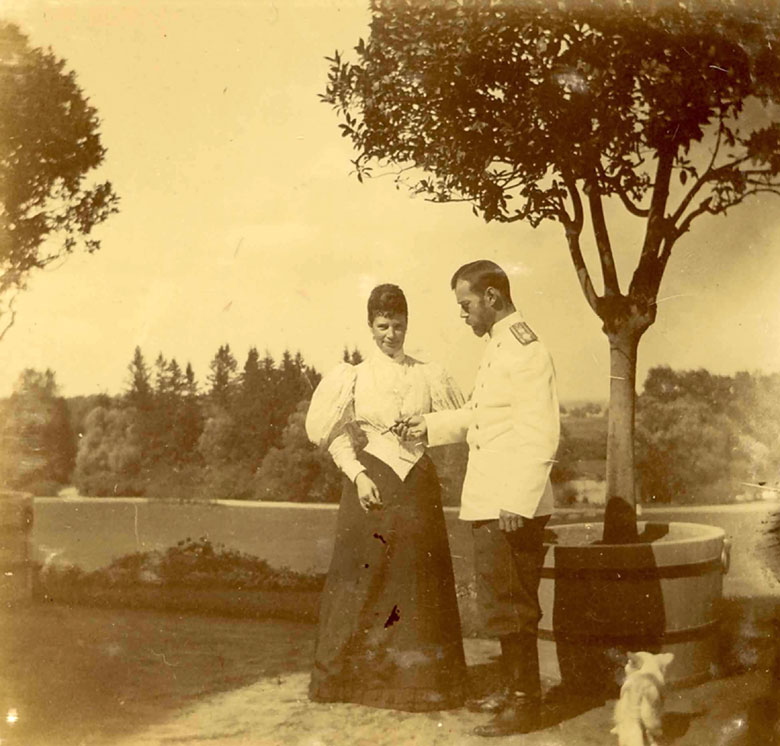
Emperor Nicholas II and his mother Empress Dowager Maria Feodorovna in 1896

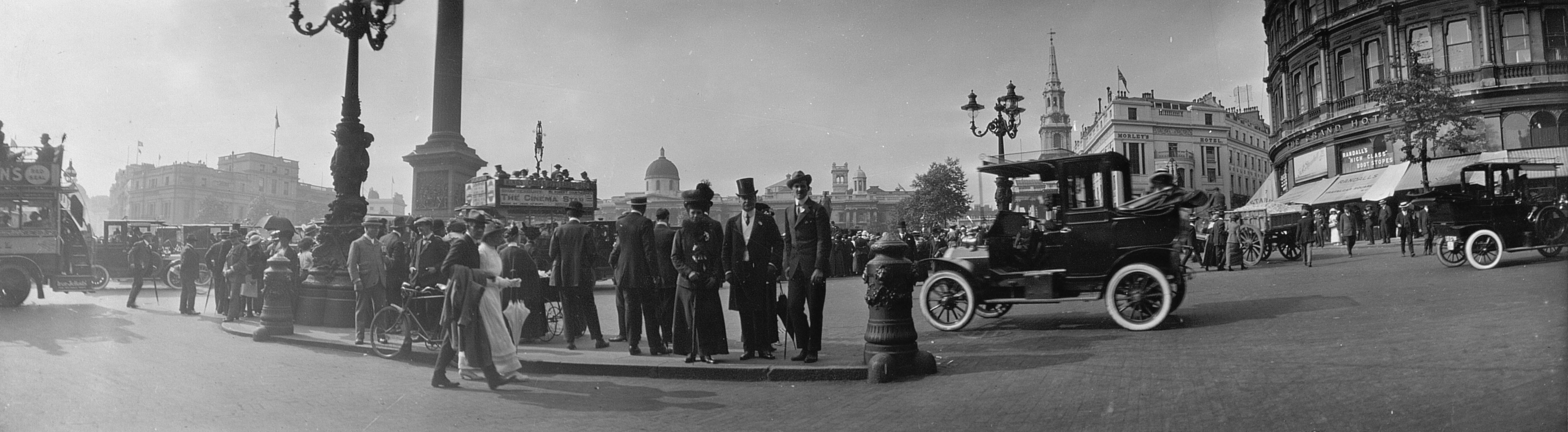
Maria in Trafalgar Square on the occasion of the Alexandra Rose Day 1914. The Empress Dowager spent much time abroad and in Great Britain, having a liberal mentality.

On 1 November 1894, Alexander III died aged just 49 at Livadia. In her diary Maria wrote, "I am utterly heartbroken and despondent, but when I saw the blissful smile and the peace in his face that came after, it gave me strength." Two days later, the Prince and Princess of Wales arrived at Livadia from London. While the Prince of Wales took it upon himself to involve himself in the preparations for the funeral, the Princess of Wales spent her time comforting grieving Maria, including praying with her and sleeping at her bedside. Maria Feodorovna's birthday was a week after the funeral, and as it was a day in which court mourning could be somewhat relaxed, Nicholas used the day to marry Alix of Hesse-Darmstadt, who took the name Alexandra Feodorovna.

As Empress Dowager, Maria was much more popular than either Nicholas or Alexandra. During her son's coronation in May 1896, she, Nicholas, and Alexandra arrived in separate carriages. She was greeted with "almost deafening" applause. Visiting writer Kate Kool noted that she "provoked more cheering from the people than did her son. The people have had thirteen years in which to know this woman and they have learned to love her very much." Richard Harding Davis, an American journalist, was surprised that she "was more loudly greeted than either the Emperor or the Czarina." Once the death of Alexander III had receded, Maria again took a brighter view of the future. "Everything will be all right", as she said. Maria continued to live in the Anichkov Palace in St. Petersburg and at Gatchina Palace.

As a new Imperial Train was constructed for Nicholas II in time for his coronation, Alexander III's "Temporary Imperial Train" (composed of the cars that had survived the Borki disaster and a few converted standard passenger cars) was transferred to the Empress Dowager's personal use.

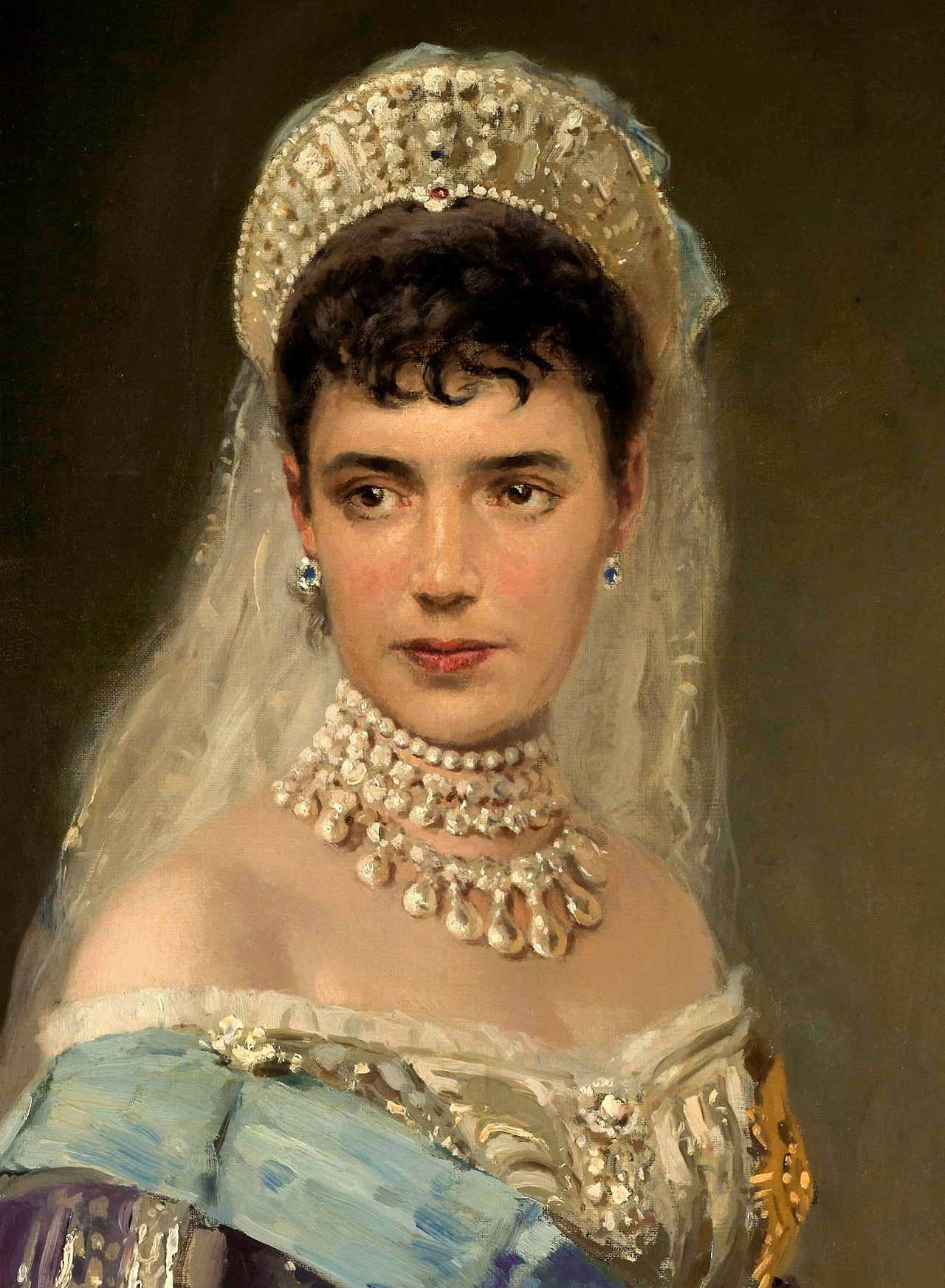
Empress Dowager Maria Feodorovna by Vladimir Makovsky (1912)

During the first years of her son's reign, Maria often acted as the political adviser to the Tsar. Uncertain of his own ability and aware of her connections and knowledge, Tsar Nicholas II often told the ministers that he would ask her advice before making decisions, and the ministers sometimes suggested this themselves. It was reportedly on her advice that Nicholas initially kept his father's ministers. Maria herself estimated that her son was of a weak character and that it was better that he was influenced by her than someone worse. Her daughter Olga remarked upon her influence: "she had never before taken the least interest … now she felt it was her duty. Her personality was magnetic and her zest of activity was incredible. She had her finger on every educational pulse in the empire. She would work her secretaries to shreds, but she did not spare herself. Even when bored in committee she never looked bored. Her manner and, above all, her tact conquered everybody". After the death of her spouse, Maria came to be convinced that Russia needed reforms to avoid a revolution. According to courtier Paul Benckendorff there was a scene when Maria asked her son not to appoint the conservative Viktor von Wahl as minister for internal affairs: "during which one [the empress dowager] almost threw herself at his [the tsar's] knees' begging him not to make this appointment and to choose someone who could make concessions. She said that if Nicholas did not agree, she would 'leave for Denmark, and then without me here let them twist your head around'". Nicholas did appoint her favored candidate in 1904, and she reportedly told that candidate, the liberal reformist Pyotr Sviatopolk-Mirsky, to accept by saying: "You must fulfil my son's wish; If you do, I will give you a kiss". After the first few years of his reign, Nicholas II replaced his mother as his political confidant and adviser with his wife, Empress Alexandra.

Maria Feodorovna's grandson-in-law, Prince Felix Yusupov, noted that she had great influence in the Romanov family. Sergei Witte praised her tact and diplomatic skill. Nevertheless, despite her social tact, she did not get along well with her daughter-in-law, Tsarina Alexandra, holding her responsible for many of the woes that beset her son Nicholas and the Russian Empire in general. She was appalled with Alexandra's inability to win favour with the public, and also that she did not give birth to an heir until almost ten years after her marriage, after bearing four daughters. The fact that Russian court custom dictated that an empress dowager took precedence over an empress consort, combined with the possessiveness that Maria had of her sons, and her jealousy of Empress Alexandra only served to exacerbate tensions between mother-in-law and daughter-in-law. Sophie Buxhoeveden remarked of this conflict: "Without actually clashing they seemed fundamentally unable … to understand one another", and her daughter Olga commented: "they had tried to understand each other and failed. They were utterly different in character, habits and outlook". Maria was sociable and a good dancer, with an ability to ingratiate herself with people, while Alexandra, though intelligent and beautiful, was very shy and closed herself off from the Russian people.

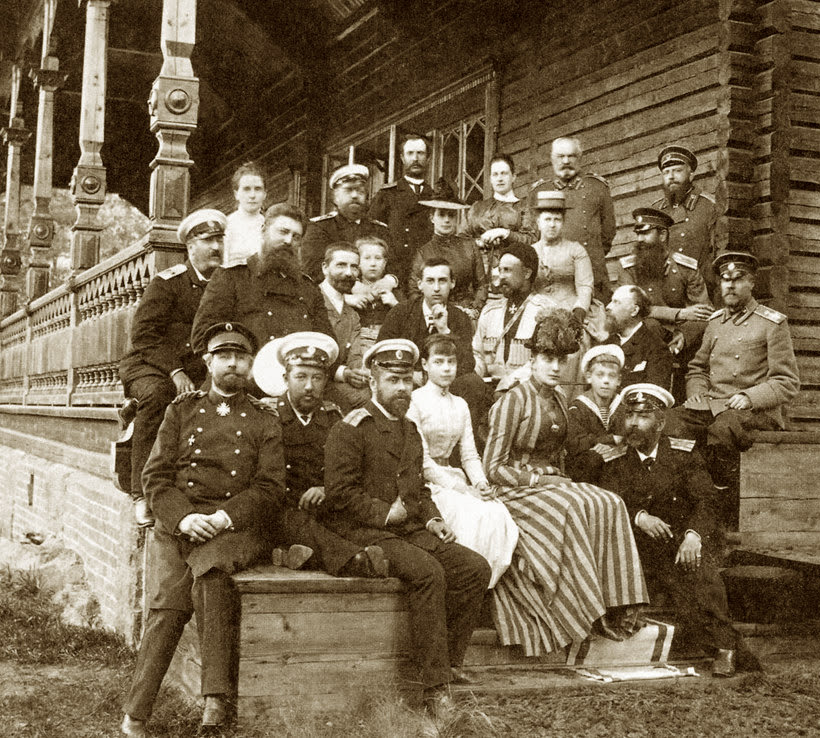
Emperor Alexander III and Empress Maria Feodorovna in the family circle on the porch of their home at Langinkoski in Kotka, Finland

By the turn of the twentieth century, Maria was spending increasing time abroad. In 1906, following the death of their father, King Christian IX, she and her sister, Alexandra, who had become queen-consort of the United Kingdom in 1901, purchased the villa of Hvidøre. The following year, a change in political circumstances allowed Maria Feodorovna to be welcomed to England by King Edward VII and Queen Alexandra, Maria's first visit to England since 1873. Following a visit in early 1908, Maria Feodorovna was present at her brother-in-law and sister's visit to Russia that summer. A little under two years later, Maria Feodorovna travelled to England yet again, this time for the funeral of her brother-in-law, King Edward VII, in May 1910. During her nearly three-month visit to England in 1910, Maria Feodorovna attempted, unsuccessfully, to get her sister, now Queen Dowager Alexandra, to claim a position of precedence over her daughter-in-law, Queen Mary.

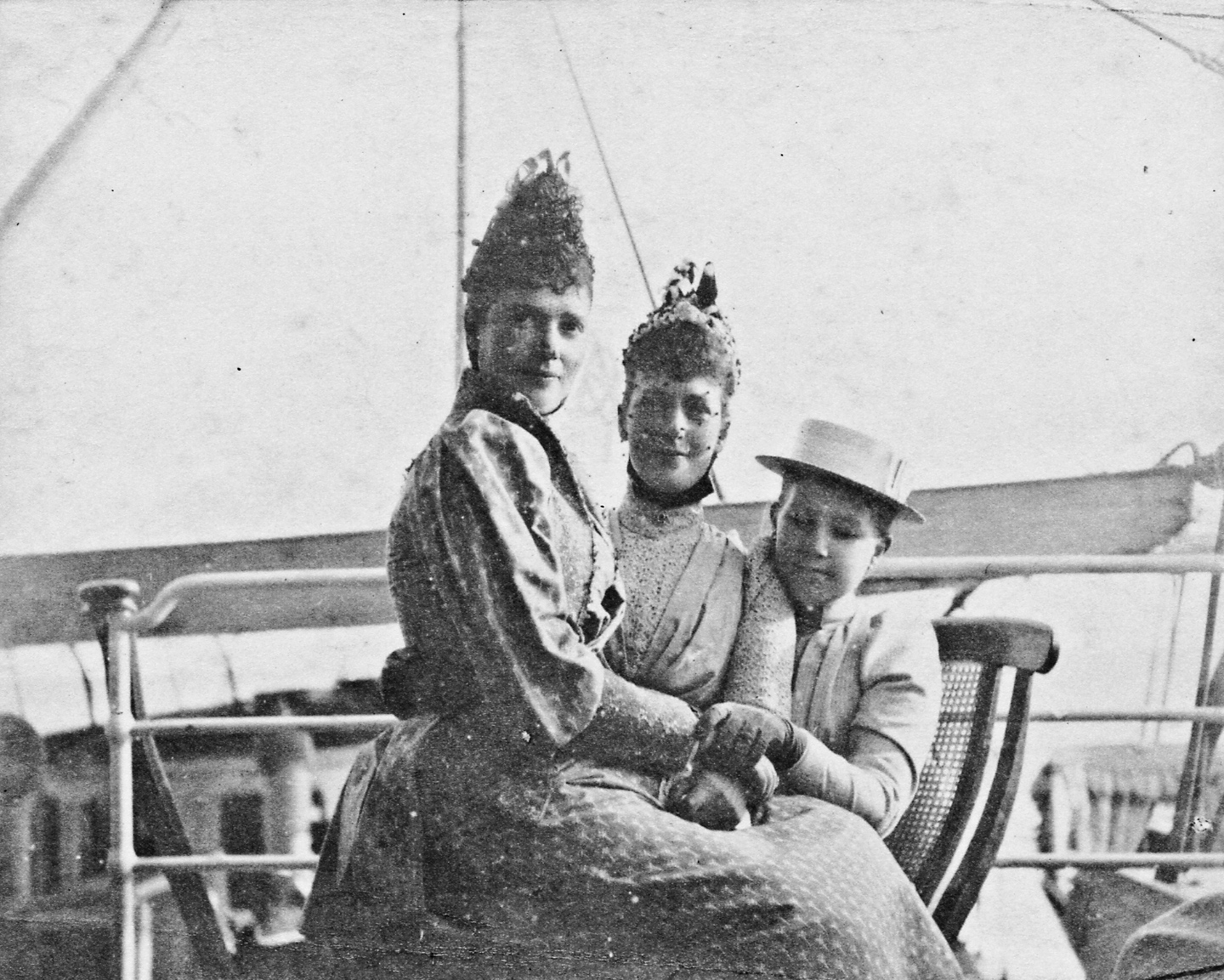
Maria Feodorovna (left) with her sister Alexandra (center) with their niece Maria of Greece, (right) circa 1893

Empress Maria Feodorovna, the mistress of Langinkoski retreat, was also otherwise a known friend of Finland. During the first Russification period, she tried to have her son halt the constraining of the grand duchy's autonomy and to recall the unpopular Governor-General Nikolai Bobrikov from Finland to some other position in Russia itself. During the second Russification period, at the start of the First World War, the Empress Dowager, travelling by her special train through Finland to Saint Petersburg, expressed her continued disapprobation for the Russification of Finland by having an orchestra of a welcoming committee play the March of the Pori Regiment and the Finnish national anthem "Maamme", which at the time were under the explicit ban from Franz Albert Seyn, the Governor-General of Finland.

In 1899, Maria's second son, George, died of tuberculosis in the Caucasus. During the funeral, she kept her composure, but at the end of the service, she ran from the church clutching her son's top hat that had been atop the coffin and collapsed in her carriage sobbing.

In 1901, Maria arranged Olga's disastrous marriage to Duke Peter Alexandrovich of Oldenburg. For years Nicholas refused to grant his unhappy sister a divorce, only relenting in 1916 in the midst of the War. When Olga attempted to contract a morganatic marriage with Nikolai Kulikovsky, Maria Feodorovna and the tsar tried to dissuade her, yet, they did not protest too vehemently. Indeed, Maria Feodorovna was one of the few people who attended the wedding in November 1916.

In 1912, Maria faced trouble with her youngest son, when he secretly married his mistress, much to the outrage and scandal of both Maria Feodorovna and Nicholas.

Maria Feodorovna disliked Rasputin and unsuccessfully tried to convince Nicholas and Alexandra to send him away. She considered Rasputin a dangerous charlatan and despaired of Alexandra's obsession with "crazy, dirty, religious fanatics". She was concerned that Rasputin's activities damaged the prestige of the Imperial family and asked Nicholas and Alexandra to send him away. Nicholas remained silent and Alexandra refused. Maria recognized the empress was the true regent and that she also lacked the capability for such a position: "My poor daughter-in-law does not perceive that she is ruining the dynasty and herself. She sincerely believes in the holiness of an adventurer, and we are powerless to ward off the misfortune, which is sure to come." When the Tsar dismissed minister Vladimir Kokovtsov in February 1914 on the advice of Alexandra, Maria again reproached her son, who answered in such a way that she became even more convinced that Alexandra was the real ruler of Russia, and she called upon Kokovtsov and said to him: "My daughter-in-law does not like me; she thinks that I am jealous of her power. She does not perceive that my one aspiration is to see my son happy. Yet I see we are nearing some kind of catastrophe and the Tsar listens to no one but flatterers… Why do you not tell the Tsar everything that you think and know… if it is not already too late".

=== World War I ===
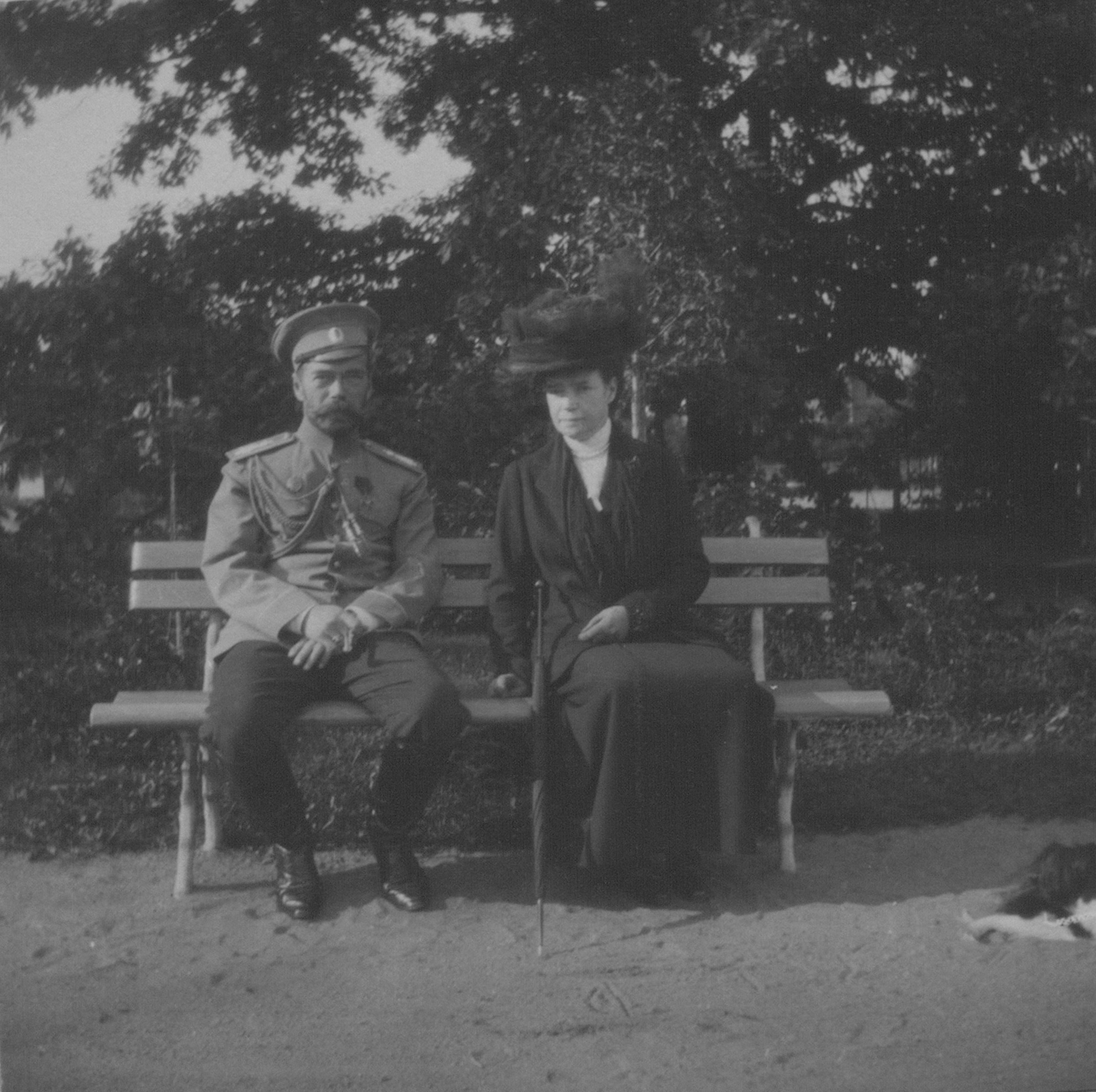
Nicholas II and his mother in the Yelagin Island, St. Petersburg, August 1915

In May 1914, Maria Feodorovna travelled to England to visit her sister. While she was in London, World War I broke out (July 1914), forcing her to hurry home to Russia. In Berlin the German authorities prevented her train from continuing toward the Russian border. Instead she had to return to Russia by way of (neutral) Denmark and Finland. Upon her return in August, she took up residence at Yelagin Palace, which was closer to St. Petersburg (renamed Petrograd in August 1914) than Gatchina. During the war she served as president of Russia's Red Cross. As she had done a decade earlier in the Russo-Japanese War of 1904–1905, she also financed a sanitary train.

During the war, there was great concern within the imperial house about the influence Empress Alexandra had upon state affairs through the Tsar, and the influence Grigori Rasputin was believed to have upon her, as it was considered to provoke the public and endanger the safety of the imperial throne and the survival of the monarchy. On behalf of the imperial relatives of the Tsar, both the Empress's sister Grand Duchess Elizabeth Feodorovna and her cousin Grand Duchess Victoria Feodorovna had been selected to mediate and ask Empress Alexandra to banish Rasputin from court to protect her and the throne's reputation, but without success. In parallel, several of the Grand Dukes had tried to intervene with the Tsar, but with no more success.

During this conflict of 1916–1917, Grand Duchess Maria Pavlovna reportedly planned a coup d'état to depose the Tsar with the help of four regiments of the imperial guard which were to invade the Alexander Palace, force the Tsar to abdicate and replace him with his underage son under the regency of her son Grand Duke Kirill.

There are documents that support the fact that in this critical situation, Maria Feodorovna was involved in a planned coup d'état to depose her son from the throne in order to save the monarchy. The plan was reportedly for Maria to make a final ultimatum to the Tsar to banish Rasputin unless he wished for her to leave the capital, which would be the signal to unleash the coup. Exactly how she planned to replace her son is unconfirmed, but two versions are available: first, that Grand Duke Paul Alexandrovich of Russia would take power in Maria's name, and that she herself would thereafter become sole empress of Russia (like Catherine the Great did over 100 years prior); the other version further claims that Grand Duke Paul Alexandrovich of Russia would replace the Tsar with his son, the heir to the throne, Maria's grandson Alexei, upon which Maria and Paul Alexandrovich would share power as regents during his minority.

Maria was asked to make her appeal to the Tsar after Empress Alexandra had asked the Tsar to dismiss minister Alexei Polivanov. Initially, she refused to make the appeal, and her sister-in-law Grand Duchess Maria Pavlovna stated to the French Ambassador: "It's not want of courage or inclination that keeps her back. It's better that she don't. She's too outspoken and imperious. The moment she starts to lecture her son, her feelings run away with her; she sometimes says the exact opposite of what she should; she annoys and humiliates him. Then he stands on his dignity and reminds his mother he is the emperor. They leave each other in a rage". Eventually, she was however convinced to make the appeal. Reportedly, Empress Alexandra was informed about the planned coup, and when Maria Feodorovna made the ultimatum to the Tsar, the empress convinced him to order his mother to leave the capital. Consequently, the Empress Dowager left Petrograd to live in the Mariinskyi Palace in Kiev the same year. She never again returned to Russia's capital. Empress Alexandra commented about her departure: "It's much better Mother-dear stays … at Kiev, where the climate is better and she can live as she wishes and hears less gossip".

In Kiev, Maria engaged in the Red Cross and hospital work, and in September, the 50th anniversary of her arrival in Russia was celebrated with great festivities, during which she was visited by her son, Nicholas II, who came without his wife. Empress Alexandra wrote to the Tsar: "When you see Mother-dear, you must rather sharply tell her how pained you are, that she listens to slander and does not stop it, as it makes mischief and others would be delighted, I am sure, to put her against me…" Maria did ask Nicholas II to remove both Rasputin and Alexandra from all political influence, but shortly after, Nicholas and Alexandra broke all contact with the Tsar's family.

When Rasputin was murdered, part of the Imperial relatives asked Maria to return to the capital and use the moment to replace Alexandra as the Tsar's political adviser. Maria refused, but she did admit that Alexandra should be removed from influence over state affairs: "Alexandra Feodorovna must be banished. Don't know how but it must be done. Otherwise she might go completely mad. Let her enter a convent or just disappear".

=== The anti-German pair ===
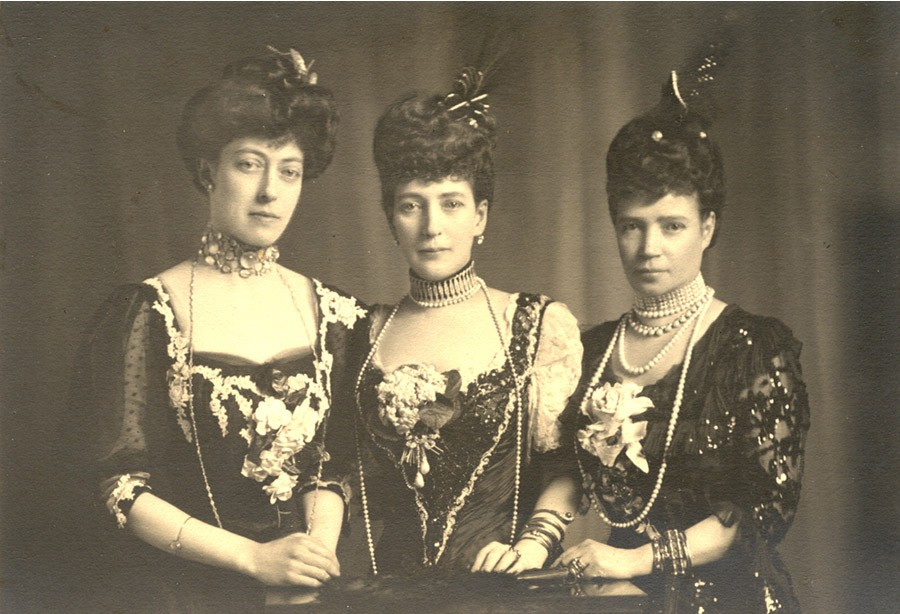
Empress Dowager Maria Feodorovna (right), with her elder sister, Queen Alexandra (centre) and her niece, Princess Victoria (left), London, 1903

Maria and her sister Alexandra, who was married to King Edward VII, were anti-German and made no secret of their feelings. Born Danish princesses, Maria and Alexandra resented the Prussian annexation of the former Danish territory of Schleswig-Holstein during the Second Schleswig War. They deeply hated and distrusted Alexandra's nephew, the German Kaiser Wilhelm II, whom Alexandra accused in 1900 of being "inwardly our enemy".

Known as the "international anti-German pair", both sisters frequently interfered in the foreign policy of their respective empires, through diplomacy or espionage, in the hope of undermining German interests. In 1905, the German Kaiser Wilhelm II wrote to Nicholas II accusing the Tsar's mother of (in collusion with Alexandra and Edward VII) fomenting anti-German sentiment at the Russian court through the diplomat Alexander von Benckendorff. The German Kaiser described von Benckendorff as having met secretly with Maria in Copenhagen at the request of Edward VII to discuss strengthening the Anglo-Russian union in an attempt to isolate Germany and curb its growing influence in Asia.

== Revolution and exile ==
Revolution came to Russia in 1917, first with the February Revolution, then with Nicholas II's abdication on 15 March. After travelling from Kiev to meet with her deposed son, Nicholas II, in Mogilev, Maria returned to the city, where she quickly realised how Kiev had changed and that her presence was no longer wanted. She was persuaded by her family there to travel to the Crimea by train with a group of other refugee Romanovs, arriving at the end of March.

After a time living in one of the imperial residences in the Crimea, she received reports that her sons, her daughter-in-law and her grandchildren had been murdered. However, she publicly rejected the report as a rumour. On the day after the murder of the Tsar's family, Maria received a messenger from Nicky, "a touching man" who told of how difficult life was for her son's family in Yekaterinburg. "And nobody can help or liberate them – only God! My Lord save my poor, unlucky Nicky, help him in his hard ordeals!"

In her diary she comforted herself: "I am sure they all got out of Russia and now the Bolsheviks are trying to hide the truth." She firmly held on to this conviction until her death. The truth was too painful for her to admit publicly. Her letters to her son and his family have since almost all been lost; but in one that survives, she wrote to Nicholas: "You know that my thoughts and prayers never leave you. I think of you day and night and sometimes feel so sick at heart that I believe I cannot bear it any longer. But God is merciful. He will give us strength for this terrible ordeal." Maria's daughter Olga Alexandrovna commented further on the matter, "Yet I am sure that deep in her heart my mother had steeled herself to accept the truth some years before her death."

Since Maria Feodorovna steadfastly believed Nicholas and his family survived, she firmly regarded Franziska Schanzkowska (famously known as "Anna Anderson") as a fraud falsely claiming to be her granddaughter, Grand Duchess Anastasia Nikolaevna of Russia. Maria vehemently opposed her daughter Olga Alexandrovna meeting with the imposter, which Olga did in 1925. Olga came to the conclusion Schanzkowska was an imposter, noting afterwards in a letter to former adjunct Anatole Mordvinov that Maria Feodorovna "isn't interested at all" in the imposter and the dowager empress "opposed my trip, but I had to go for the sake of the family." She also wrote that Schanzkowska's supporters subsequently accused Maria Feodorovna of ordering Olga (as well as others who knew Anastasia and refuted Schanzkowska's claim) to reject Shanzkowska's claim to be Anastasia, which Olga called a "huge lie".

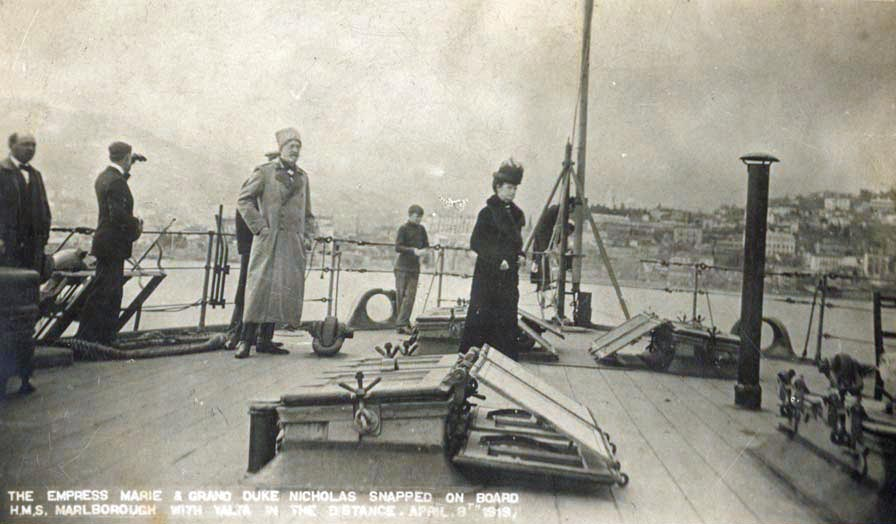
Empress Maria and Grand Duke Nicholas on board HMS Marlborough leaving Russia forever with Yalta in the distance

Despite the overthrow of the monarchy in 1917, the former Empress Dowager Maria at first refused to leave Russia. Only in early April 1919, at the urging of her sister, Queen Dowager Alexandra, did she begrudgingly depart, fleeing Crimea over the Black Sea to London. King George V sent the battleship HMS Marlborough to retrieve his aunt. The party of 17 Romanovs included her daughter the Grand Duchess Xenia and five of Xenia's sons plus six dogs and a canary.

After a brief stay in the British base in Malta, they travelled to England on the British battleship HMS Lord Nelson, and she stayed with her sister, Alexandra. Although Queen Alexandra never treated her sister badly and they spent time together at Marlborough House in London and at Sandringham House in Norfolk, Maria, as a deposed empress dowager, felt that she was now "number two", in contrast to her sister, a popular queen dowager, and she returned to her native Denmark in November 1919. After living briefly with her nephew, King Christian X, in a wing of the Amalienborg Palace, she chose her holiday villa Hvidøre, which was originally a summer retreat near Copenhagen, as her new permanent home in 1923.

There were many Russian émigrées in Copenhagen who continued to regard her as the Empress and often asked her for help. The All-Russian Monarchical Assembly held in 1921 offered her the locum tenens of the Russian throne but she declined with the evasive answer "Nobody saw Nicky killed" and therefore there was a chance her son was still alive. She provided financial support to Nikolai Sokolov, who studied the circumstances of the death of the Tsar's family, but they never met. The Grand Duchess Olga sent a telegram to Paris cancelling an appointment because it would have been too difficult for the old and sick woman to hear the terrible story of her son and his family.

== Death and burial ==
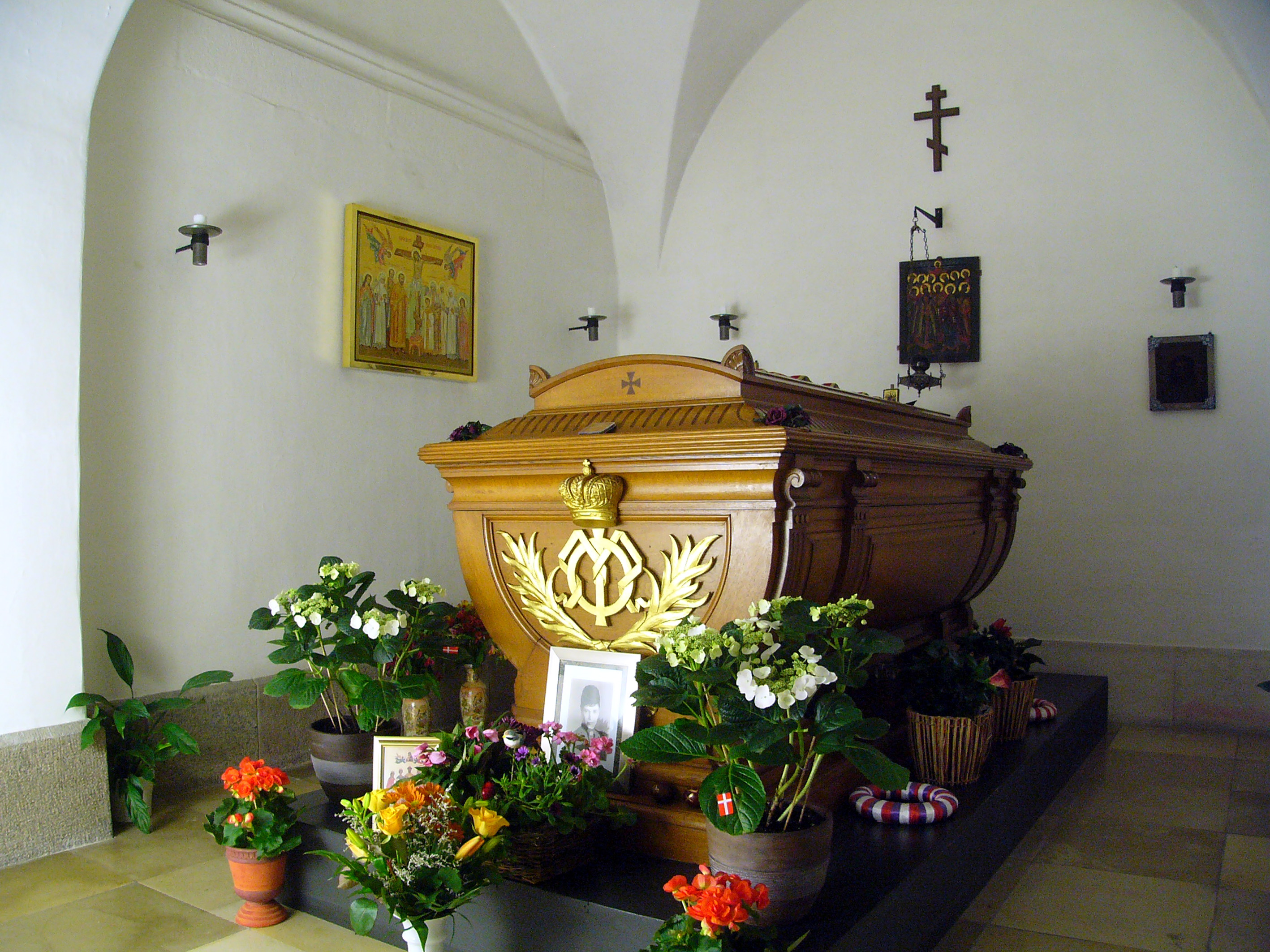
The sarcophagus of Maria Feodorovna in the vaults of Roskilde Cathedral

In August 1924, Grand Duke Kirill Vladimirovich of Russia proclaimed himself "Tsar of all the Russias", Maria Feodorovna reacted with indignation and regarded his action as presumptuous. In a telegram to him, she made clear that she did not recognise his claim to the title, writing: "I am convinced that my two beloved sons are alive and so cannot consider your act a fait accompli."

After her final visit to England in 1923, Maria Feodorovna "looked old and tired … she lost her appetite and strength." In 1925, she visited the Russian Orthodox Alexander Nevsky Church in Copenhagen, a church she had originally supported, for the last time. The church continued to serve the Russian émigré community after the Revolution, but by this time her health often prevented her from attending services. On such occasions, religious services were held at her villa at Hvidøre by her spiritual father, Archpriest Leonid Kolichev, for her and her close associates.

In November 1925, Maria's favourite sister, Queen Alexandra, died. That was the last loss that she could bear. "She was ready to meet her Creator," wrote her son-in-law, Grand Duke Alexander Mikhailovich, about Dowager Empress Maria's last years. On 13 October 1928 at Hvidøre near Copenhagen, in a house she had once shared with her sister Queen Alexandra, Dowager Empress Maria died at the age of 80 of heart failure, having outlived four of her six children. Following services in Copenhagen's Russian Orthodox Alexander Nevsky Church, the Empress was interred at Roskilde Cathedral on the island of Zealand, the traditional burial site for Danish monarchs since the 15th century.

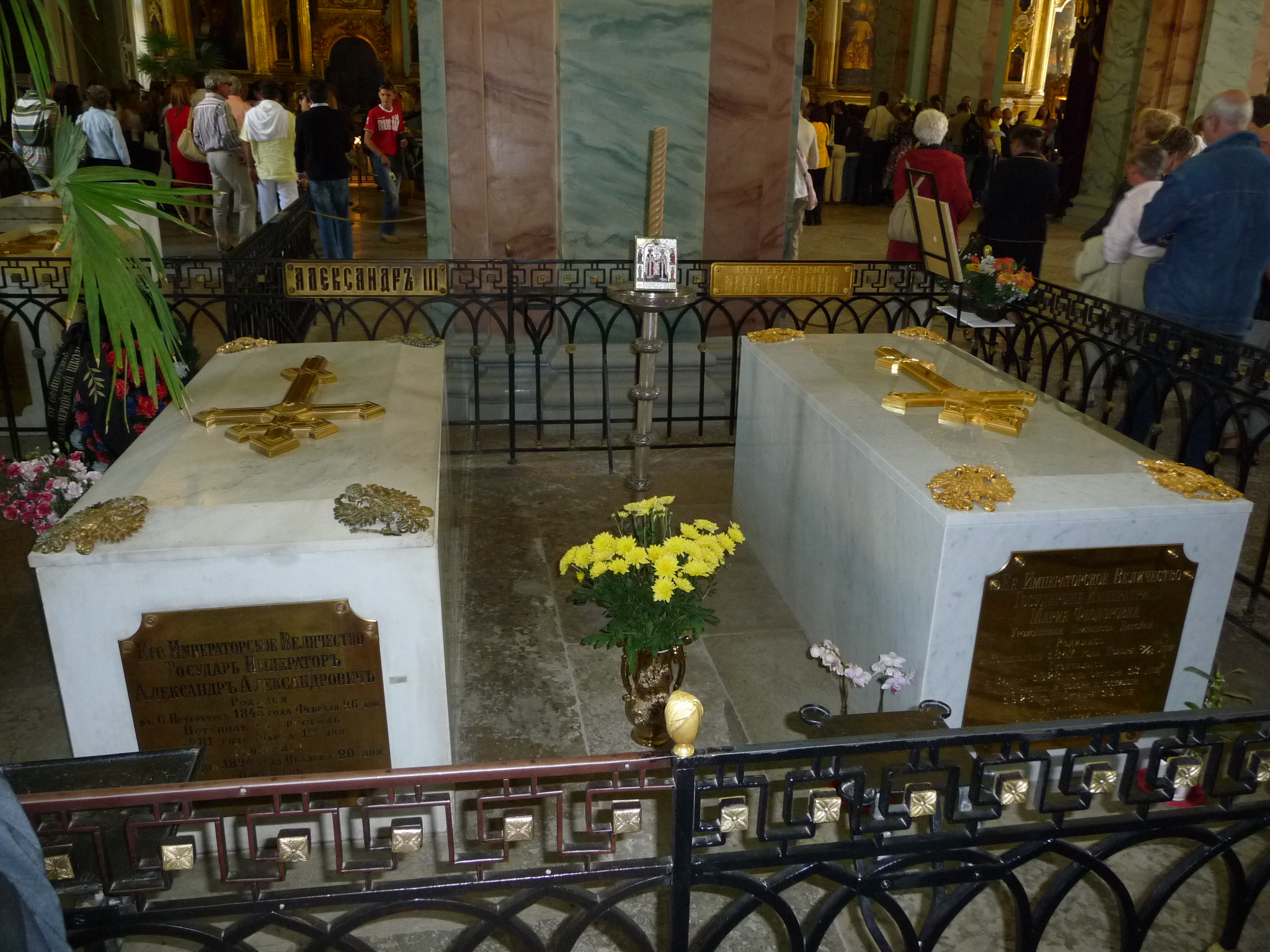
The sarcophagi of Alexander III and Maria Feodorovna in the Peter and Paul Cathedral

In 2005, Queen Margrethe II of Denmark and President Vladimir Putin of Russia and their respective governments agreed that the Empress's remains should be returned to St. Petersburg in accordance with her wish to be interred next to her husband. A number of ceremonies took place from 23 to 28 September 2006. The funeral service, attended by high dignitaries, including the Crown Prince and Crown Princess of Denmark and Prince and Princess Michael of Kent, did not pass without some turbulence. The crowd around the coffin was so great that a young Danish diplomat fell into the grave before the coffin was interred. On 26 September 2006, a statue of Maria Feodorovna was unveiled near her favourite Cottage Palace in Peterhof. Following a service at Saint Isaac's Cathedral, she was interred next to her husband Alexander III in the Peter and Paul Cathedral on 28 September 2006, 140 years after her first arrival in Russia and almost 78 years after her death.

== Issue ==
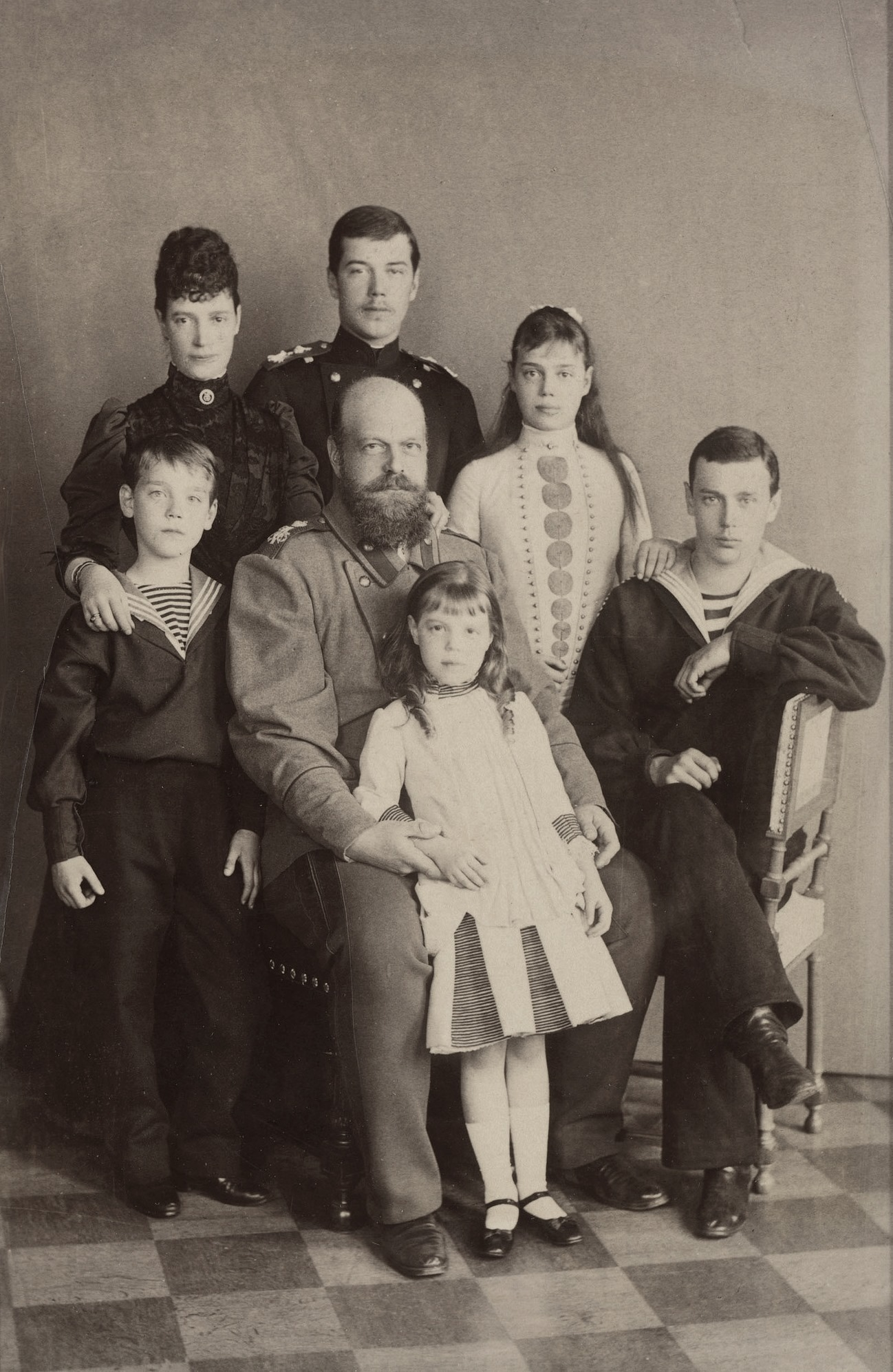
Emperor Alexander III and Empress Maria Feodorovna and their five children

Emperor Alexander III and Maria Feodorovna had four sons and two daughters:

Name	Birth	Death	Notes
Nicholas II of Russia	18 May 1868	17 July 1918	married 1894, Princess Alix of Hesse; had issue; no surviving descendants today
Grand Duke Alexander Alexandrovich of Russia	7 June 1869	2 May 1870	died of meningitis at age 10 months and 26 days
Grand Duke George Alexandrovich of Russia	9 May 1871	9 August 1899	died of tuberculosis; had no issue
Grand Duchess Xenia Alexandrovna of Russia	6 April 1875	20 April 1960	married 1894, Grand Duke Alexander Mikhailovich of Russia; had issue
Grand Duke Michael Alexandrovich of Russia	4 December 1878	13 June 1918	married 1912, Natalia Brasova; had issue; no surviving descendants today
Grand Duchess Olga Alexandrovna of Russia	13 June 1882	24 November 1960	married 1901, Duke Peter Alexandrovich of Oldenburg; no issue, 1916, Nikolai Kulikovsky; had issue

== Legacy ==
The Dagmarinkatu street in Töölö, Helsinki, and the Maria Hospital, which also previously operated in Helsinki, are named after Empress Maria Feodorovna.

She is portrayed by Helen Hayes in the 1956 Hollywood historical drama Anastasia. Irene Worth portrays her in the 1971 epic Nicholas and Alexandra. Ursula Howells played the role in one episode of the 1974 drama Fall of Eagles. Gwyneth Strong and Jane Lapotaire portrayed the Empress as a teenager and adult woman respectively in the 1975 television series Edward the Seventh. Olivia de Havilland portrayed her in the 1986 television film Anastasia: The Mystery of Anna. In the 1997 American animated version of the film Anastasia, directed by Don Bluth and Gary Goldman, Maria Feodorovna is voiced by Angela Lansbury.

== Honours ==
- Russian Empire:
  - Dame Grand Cross of the Order of Saint Catherine, 1864
  - Dame of the Order of Saint Andrew the Apostle the First-called, 1883
- Mexican Empire: Grand Cross of the Imperial Order of Saint Charles, 10 April 1865
- Kingdom of Portugal: Dame 1st Class of the Order of Queen Saint Isabel, 25 May 1881
- Kingdom of Prussia: Dame 1st Class of the Order of Louise
- Spain: Dame of the Order of Queen Maria Luisa, 6 January 1887
- Empire of Japan: Grand Cordon (Paulownia) of the Order of the Precious Crown, 23 January 1889

== Paintings by Maria Feodorovna ==
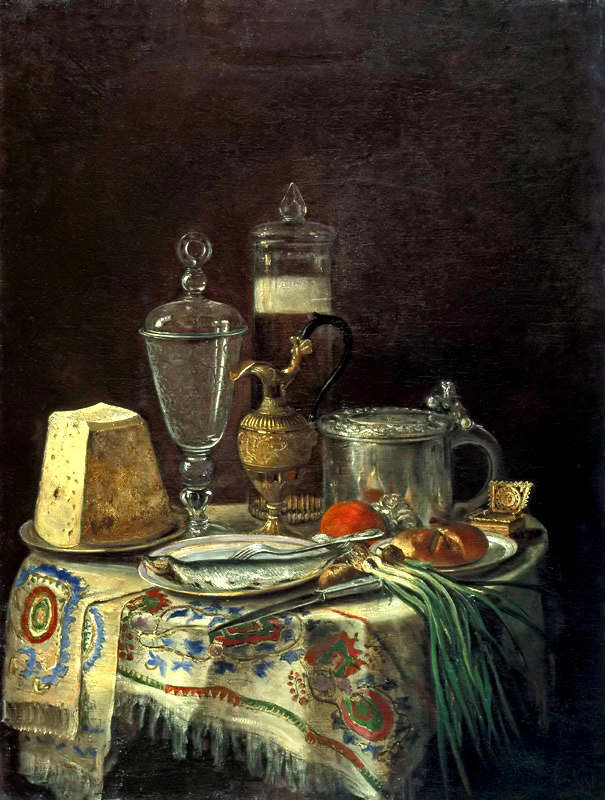
Still-life. 1868

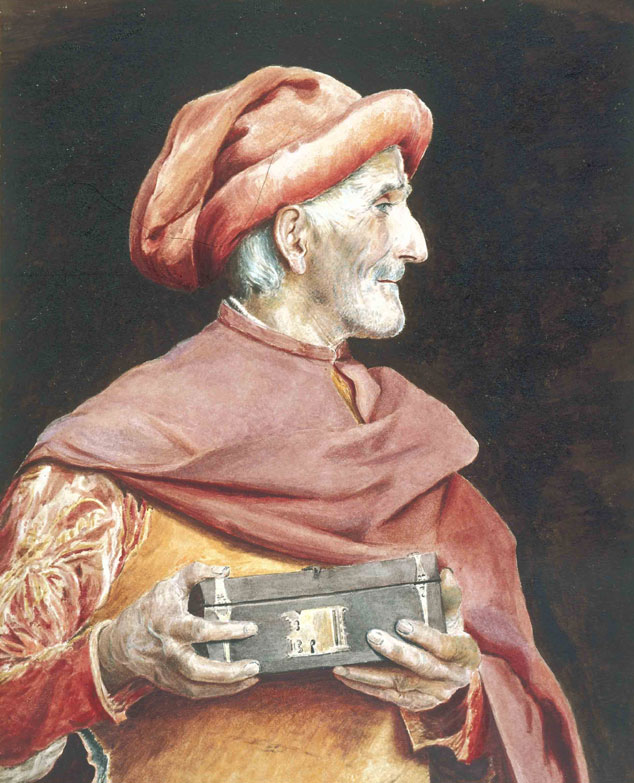
Miser. 1890

== Ancestry ==
Ancestors of Maria Feodorovna (Dagmar of Denmark)

8. Frederick Charles Louis, Duke of Schleswig-Holstein-Sonderburg-Beck
4. Frederick William, Duke of Schleswig-Holstein-Sonderburg-Glücksburg
9. Countess Friederike von Schlieben
2. Christian IX of Denmark
10. Prince Charles of Hesse-Kassel
5. Princess Louise Caroline of Hesse-Kassel
11. Princess Louise of Denmark
1. Princess Dagmar of Denmark
12. Prince Frederick of Hesse-Kassel
6. Prince William of Hesse-Kassel
13. Princess Caroline of Nassau-Usingen
3. Princess Louise of Hesse-Kassel
14. Frederick, Hereditary Prince of Denmark
7. Princess Charlotte of Denmark
15. Duchess Sophia Frederica of Mecklenburg-Schwerin

Maria Feodorovna (Dagmar of Denmark) House of Schleswig-Holstein-Sonderburg-Glücksburg Cadet branch of the House of Oldenburg Born: 26 November 1847 Died: 13 October 1928
Russian royalty
Vacant Title last held by Maria Alexandrovna (Marie of Hesse)	Empress consort of Russia; 1881–1894	Vacant Title next held by Alexandra Feodorovna (Alix of Hesse)
