= Anastasia Popova =

Anastasia Popova may refer to:

- Anastasia Popova (journalist) (born 1987), Russian journalist
- Anastasia Popova (footballer) (born 1990), Belarusian footballer
