= Atelier One =

British structural engineering company

Atelier One is a British structural engineering company, established in 1989 and based in London. The company has collaborated with architects, designers and artists (including Paul Cocksedge, Anish Kapoor and Rachel Whiteread), and has been described as "the most innovative engineering practice in the UK."

Past projects include a large number of large international projects including the shell structures of the Singapore Arts Centre, the development of Federation Square in Melbourne, Australia, and in the UK the Baltic Gallery in Gateshead and three buildings for White Cube in London.

In addition to both public and private buildings, Atelier One is also involved in a variety of art installation projects, touring exhibitions and stages. Some of the most notable completed projects are Kapoor's Cloud Gate in Chicago and stage sets for U2, The Rolling Stones and Take That.

Gardens by the Bay, a collaboration between Atelier One, Atelier Ten, Grant Associates and WilkinsonEyre, in Singapore was awarded the World Building of the Year prize at the World Architecture Festival in 2012.

In 2022 the gymnasium at the Green School in Bali, a project by Atelier One, was awarded the Supreme Award for Structural Engineering Excellence from the Institution of Structural Engineers.

== Projects ==
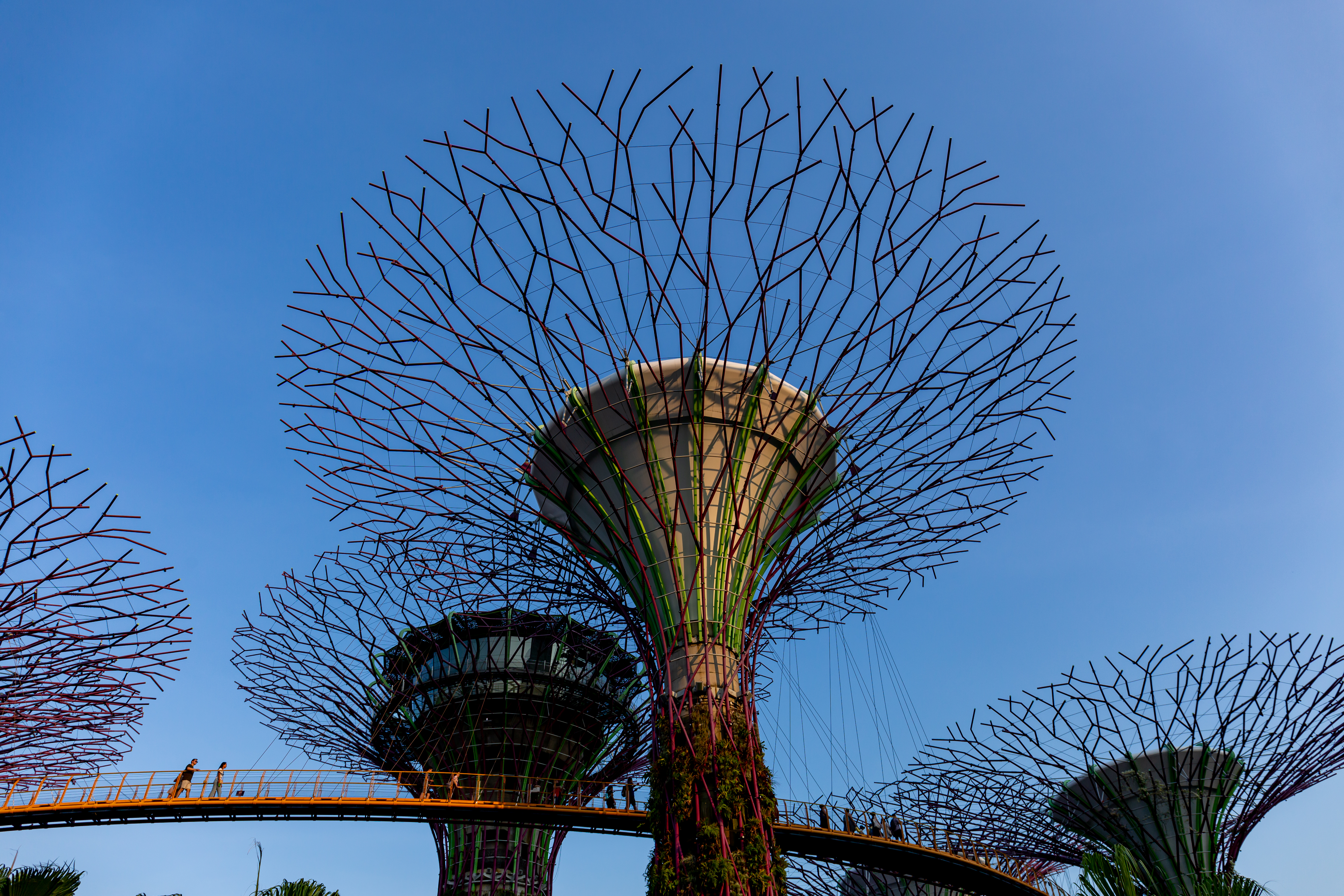
Gardens by the Bay Supertree Grove, Singapore

- 2022: ABBA Voyage, London
- 2022: Creative Centre at York St John University, York
- 2022: First Light Pavilion at Jodrell Bank Observatory, Cheshire
- 2021: Green School, Bali
- 2020: UK Pavilion at Expo 2020, Dubai
- 2020: Wall of Death, Top Gear, Alexandra Palace, London
- 2016: Chadstone Shopping Centre, Melbourne
- 2014: 2014 Winter Olympics opening ceremony, Sochi, Russia
- 2014: On the Run Tour (Beyoncé and Jay-Z)
- 2013: Cloud | Meteoros, Lucy Orta, St Pancras International, London
- 2012: Gardens by the Bay, Singapore
- 2012: Big 4, City at Night, London
- 2012: Antony Gormley Model, White Cube Bermondsey, London
- 2012: Big 4, Monument to the Unintended Performer, London
- 2012: London Olympics, opening and closing ceremonies, London
- 2012: Diamond Jubilee Concert stage, London
- 2012: Thames Diamond Jubilee Pageant Queens Barge canopy, London
- 2012: Hooke Park Big Shed, Architectural Association School of Architecture, Dorset
- 2011: White Cube Bermondsey Gallery, London
- 2011: Dune Grass, Blackpool
- 2011: Progress Live OM Man, Take That Tour
- 2009: U2 360° Tour
- 2007: Big 4, London
- 2006: Cloud Gate, Chicago
- 2006: Federation Square, Melbourne
- 2002: White Cube Gallery, London
- 1998: Bridges to Babylon Tour, The Rolling Stones
- 1993: House, Rachel Whiteread, London

== History ==
Atelier One was founded in 1989 by director Neil Thomas. Aran Chadwick joined the company in 1992, becoming a director in 1997. Thomas was also co-founder of Atelier Ten. Both directors are visiting professors to Yale University, New Haven, University of Texas and are External Examiners at the Architectural Association School of Architecture, London.

Thomas was awarded an MBE for services to architecture, design and engineering in 2016.
