= Langlands & Bell =

Artist duo

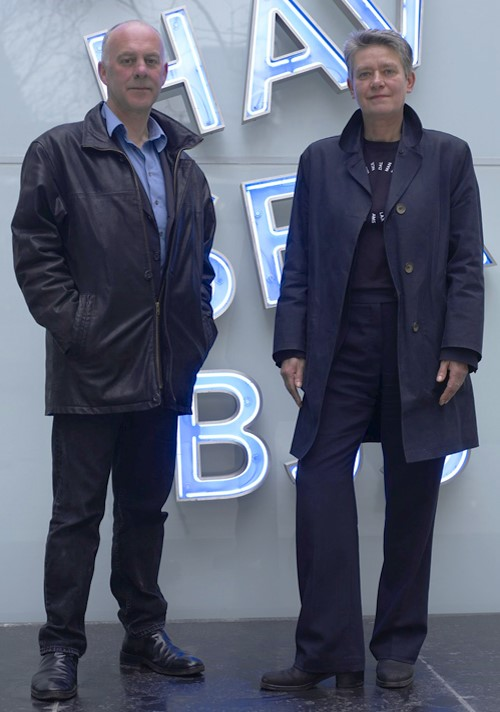
Langlands & Bell

Langlands & Bell are two artists who work collaboratively. Ben Langlands (born London 1955) and Nikki Bell (born London 1959), began collaborating in 1978, while studying Fine Art at Middlesex Polytechnic in North London, from 1977 to 1980.

== Artistic practice and career ==
Their artistic practice ranges from sculpture, film and video, to digital media projects, art installations and full-scale architecture. Their work focuses on the web of relationships linking people with architecture and the built environment, and on a wider, global level, the coded systems of mass-communications and exchange we use to negotiate a progressive technological world.

Their first collaboration, in 1978, was an installation called The Kitchen, consisting of two side-by-side kitchens, one created by Langlands and the other by Bell.

In the mid-1980s, they became known for making monochromatic sculptures and reliefs, often in the form of furniture or architectural models, which employed an analytical and almost archeological approach to architecture and design typologies to explore human relationships from the personal, to the cultural, economic and political.

Langlands & Bell have exhibited internationally throughout their career including in exhibitions at Tate Britain and Tate Modern, the Imperial War Museum, the Serpentine Gallery, and the Whitechapel Art Gallery in London, at IMMA, Dublin, Kunsthalle Bielefeld, Germany, MoMA, New York, the Central House of the Artist, Moscow, the State Hermitage Museum, St Petersburg, Venice Biennale, Seoul Biennale, and CCA Kitakyushu and TN Probe, Tokyo, Japan.

Their work was first purchased by Charles Saatchi in 1990 and 1991 from exhibitions at Maureen Paley Interim Art, London. It was subsequently exhibited in the first of the Young British Artists exhibitions at the Saatchi Collection, Boundary Road in 1992, and again in the 1997 Sensation exhibition at the Royal Academy in London. Sensation toured to the Hamburger Bahnhof, Berlin and the Brooklyn Museum, New York in 1998/99.

In 1996–1997, a major survey exhibition Langlands & Bell Works 1986–1996 co-curated by the Serpentine Gallery, London, and Kunsthalle Bielefeld, Germany also toured to Cantieri Culturali alla Zisa, Palermo, Italy, and Koldo Mitxelena, San Sebastián, Spain.

In 2002, Langlands & Bell were commissioned by the Art Commissions Committee of the Department of Art at the Imperial War Museum, London, to travel to Afghanistan to research "The Aftermath of September 11 and the War in Afghanistan".

In 2004, they won a British Academy of Film & Television Arts award for Interactive Arts Installation for The House of Osama bin Laden, the trilogy of art works resulting from their visit. The group of works includes an interactive computer animation examining the house near Jalalabad occupied by Osama bin Laden in the late 1990s. In 2004 Langlands & Bell were also short-listed for the Turner Prize for the same work. A few days before the exhibition opened, the film Zardad's Dog, which constituted a third of their presentation, was withdrawn due to legal advice received by Tate that it was sub-judice because of the impending trial of Faryadi Sarwar Zardad, an Afghan former warlord at the Old Bailey.

The largest artworks to date by Langlands & Bell are, the 2004 Paddington Basin Bridge, designed in association with Atelier One (structural engineers), an 8-metre high x 45-metre long white metal and glass pedestrian bridge linking Paddington station and the new Paddington Basin Development, London, with a capacity of up to 20,000 people per day; Moving World (Night & Day) (2007) — two 6 x 18-metre permanent outdoor sculptures of steel, glass, and digitally controlled neon at Heathrow Terminal 5; and China, Language of Places (2009), the 18-metre wall painting exhibited in English Lounge at Tang Contemporary Art, 798, Beijing in 2009.

Artworks by Langlands & Bell are in the permanent collections of many prominent international art museums including the British Museum, the Imperial War Museum, Tate and the Victoria & Albert Museum in London; MoMA, New York; the Carnegie Museum of Art, Pittsburgh; the Yale Center for British Art, USA; and the State Hermitage Museum, St Petersburg, Russia.

In 2012, to go alongside the AKA Peace Exhibition at the Institute of Contemporary Arts, Art Below showcased selected works from the AKA Peace series on the London Underground including Langlands & Bell's 'Sign of the Times' 2021. "AKA Peace" originally conceived by photographer Bran Symondson and now curated by artist Jake Chapman, was an exhibition of new works made specially for The Peace One Day Project 2012, bringing together a group of Contemporary Artists, all of whom agreed to transform a decommissioned AK-47 assault rifle, refashioning them into artworks.

In 2016 Langlands & Bell completed the art installation "Beauty < Immortality", a permanent memorial to Frank Pick at Piccadilly Circus Underground station in London that was commissioned by London Transport Museum and Art on the Underground.

Recent solo exhibitions by Langlands & Bell include, "Infinite Loop" at Alan Cristea Gallery, London (2017), "Internet Giants: Masters of the Universe", Ikon Gallery, Birmingham (2018), "Degrees of Truth", Sir John Soane's Museum, London (2020), and "Curators Signatures", CCA Kitakyushu, Japan 2020, "The Past is Never Dead…" Gallery 1957, Accra, Ghana (2021).

From April to September 2022 Langlands & Bell will present 3 exhibitions, "Near Heaven", "Ideas of Utopia", and "Absent Artists", at Charleston, the former East Sussex home of the Bloomsbury Group artists Vanessa Bell and Duncan Grant.

== Personal lives ==
Langlands & Bell live in a four-storey Georgian house in Whitechapel, East London, which they bought as a ruin in 1982. They took 18 months out of their careers between 1987 and 1989 to renovate the house and expand their workspace. Since 2010 they have divided their time between Whitechapel and "Untitled" in Kent, the modern off-grid house and studio they designed themselves with structural engineers Atelier One.
