= Jatun Sacha Foundation =

Non-profit Ecuadorian organization

The Jatun Sacha Foundation is a private Ecuadorian non profit NGO (nongovernmental organisation) founded in 1985. The purpose of this organisation is outlined on its website as:

"Foundation Jatun Sacha is dedicated to the conservation, investigation and management of ecologically important habitats, environmental education and community development."

The name Jatun Sacha is derived from the local Kichwa language, variably translated as "big forest" or "big jungle".

== Network of biological reserves ==
The Jatun Sacha Foundation is an Ecuadorian non governmental non profit, private organization. It was legally established in 1989 by Ministerial Agreement No. 270 from the Ministry of Agriculture, Jatun Sacha mission is to promote the conservation of the Ecuador's biodiversity, through technical training, scientific research, environmental education programs at national and international level, sustainable management of natural resources, community development, and the training of leaders with ethnic and gender participation. A major part of this foundation's function is the ownership and management of biological reserves which are found throughout Ecuador, which range in size from around 4 square kilometres to just over 25 square kilometres. Each reserve has an associated Biological station with infrastructure to support researchers, courses groups, students, visitors and volunteers who come to help with such tasks as reforestation, environmental education at nearby schools and research into sustainable agricultural practices. Volunteers may also assist with scientific studies of the local flora and fauna undertaken by biologists at these stations - the facilitation of scientific research being another function of the biological stations-. Of the reserves, two are located east of the Andes, one in the Amazon basin, two in high altitude ecosystems in the Andes mountains, two in the west of the country in more coastal ecosystems, and one station on the Galápagos Islands. These reserves include:

Amazon Reserves

- Jatun Sacha Biological Reserve and Research Station

Andean Reserves

- Guandera Biological Reserve and Research Station

Coastal Reserves

- Bilsa Biological Reserve and Research Station
- Congal Biomarine Reserve and Research Station

Galápagos Reserve

- San Cristobal Biological Reserve and Research Station

== Affiliated organizations ==
The foundation works cooperatively with many other conservation groups such the World Wide Fund for Nature (WWF), the World Conservation Union (IUCN) and Conservation International (CI), while volunteers are found and placed independently or through volunteer organizations such as their New Zealand based partner organisation, the Global volunteer network.
