= Roger J. Hamilton =

Hong Kong businesspeople and author

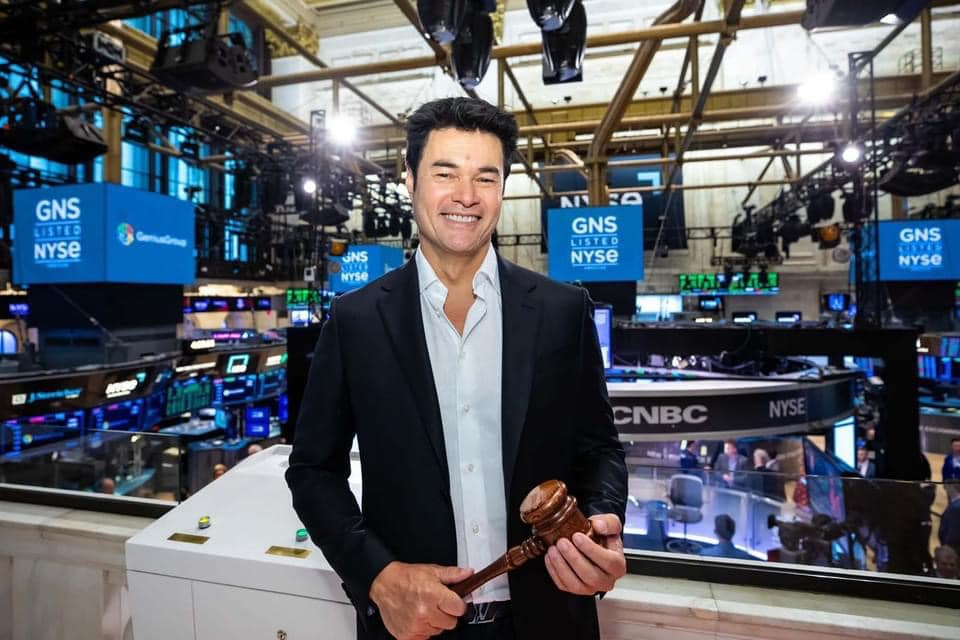
- Roger J. Hamilton at the NYSE Closing Bell Ceremony for Genius Group (NYSE American: GNS). 23 May 2022, New York, United States
- Born: Roger James Hamilton; 7 August 1968 (age 58); Hong Kong
- Occupations: Author, social entrepreneur, educator, public speaker
- Known for: Genius Group Ltd (NYSE American: GNS), Wealth Dynamics, social entrepreneurship, The Millionaire Master Plan, GeniusU, Entrepreneur Resorts, Entrepreneurs Institute
- Board member of: Genius Group Ltd (NYSE American: GNS)

Roger James Hamilton (born 7 August 1968) is a Hong Kong born, Singapore-based author, a social entrepreneur. He is the founder and CEO of Genius Group, a global entrepreneur education company. He is also best known as "Asia's leading wealth consultant" and the creator of the "Wealth Dynamics" profiling system for entrepreneurs, which is a psychometric test for entrepreneurs and businesses.

Hamilton is a regular business expert on the UK business TV network yourBusinessChannel, a member of the Clinton Global Initiative, founded by former President of the United States Bill Clinton and a member of the Transformational Leadership Council, founded by Jack Canfield. His book, The Millionaire Master Plan was listed on The New York Times and The Boston Globe bestsellers list in 2014. In 2017, his resorts company, Entrepreneur Resorts was listed on the Seychelles Securities Exchange.

== Early life ==
Hamilton was born in Hong Kong. He attended King George V School, prior to moving to Papua New Guinea. In 1984, he attended Loretto School near Edinburgh, Scotland, and graduated from Cambridge University in 1989 with a bachelor's degree in Architecture [unverified].

== Career ==
In 1989, at age 21, Hamilton co-founded Footprints, a publishing company in London. The company pioneered pictorial maps in England, and grew to 42 cities before being sold to a national printing company in 1994.

In 1995, Hamilton joined the two senior principals of Dell Inc to develop Hand Technologies, selling Apple, Microsoft and HP Technology Services through a community network. Hand was one of the pioneers in early internet sales communities.

In 1997, Hamilton launched Free Market Media in Singapore, and secured funding from venture capital firm 3i PLC. This was followed by Expat Living magazine, which has become the leading magazine for the expatiate community in Singapore.

In 2002, Hamilton wrote the book Wink And Grow Rich, which became an international best seller. He co-founded XL Group to serve and connect social entrepreneurs.

In 2009, XL Nation was established as one of the top international non-profit organisations of social entrepreneurs.

In 2014, Hamilton focused on Wealth Lighthouse, supporting the growth of XL Nation.

In 2015, GeniusU.com - An Edtech platform focused on entrepreneur education.

In 2017, Entrepreneur Resorts Limited, group of Entrepreneur Resorts and Beach Clubs around the world went public on the Merj Seychelles Stock Exchange.

In 2019, Hamilton launched Genius Group as a Singapore public company, as a global entrepreneur education group and acquired Entrepreneurs Institute, which included Wealth Dynamics and Talent Dynamics. This company is down 99.9% as of March 11, 2025. Hamilton also bought bitcoin and that purchase is down by millions of dollars as well.

In 2020, Genius Group made over $80 million in acquisitions of entrepreneur education companies, including Entrepreneur Resorts, Education Angels, E-Square Education and Property Investors Network. IN 20220 GNS

== Wealth Dynamics ==
Hamilton developed the Wealth Dynamics profiling system in 2003. This system has since been used by over 250,000 entrepreneurs around the world and has been internationally acknowledged as a valuable tool for entrepreneurs.

The system is a psychometric test based on the work of Carl Jung, and linking his work to the I Ching, which Jung studied and which influenced and relates to his published work Psychological Types published in 1921. Jung wrote the foreword to the first published translation, by Richard Wilhelm, of the I Ching. The system links back to the five Chinese elements, and the Chinese concepts of flow created from the alternating interlink of opposites.

The Wealth Dynamics system divides all success strategies into eight paths, detailed in Hamilton's book Your Life, Your Legacy: An Entrepreneur Guide to Finding Your Flow.

In 2010, the Wealth Dynamics system was supplemented with the Wealth Spectrum levels, which divides each profile into nine levels. It was also modified into the Talent Dynamics system for use in corporations. It is now being used in various organisations from the UK National Health Service (NHS) to General Mills.

In 2010, 30 leading entrepreneurs published a book on their use of Wealth Dynamics in their businesses, titled The Wealth Garden, Catching Butterflies Without a Net.

Additional books advocating the "Wealth Dynamics" model include John Williams' Screw Work Let's Play, Bob Urichuck's Disciplined for Life, and Penny & Thomas Power's A Friend in Every City.

== Bibliography ==
- Your Life Your Legacy: An Entrepreneur Guide to Finding Your Flow (2000) ISBN 978-9810569679
- Wink and Grow Rich (2002) ISBN 978-9810470135
- Wink: A Modern Day Parable (2007) ISBN 978-9810569686
- Fast Forward your Business – 8 Paths to Hyper Growth (2012) ASIN B007GVEM8C
- The Millionaire Master Plan: Your Personalized Path to Financial Success (2014) ISBN 978-1455549238

== Business ventures ==
Co-founded ventures:

- XL Group (2002) – The XL Group was founded in 2001 in Singapore to accelerate the growth of entrepreneurship and effective giving in Asia Pacific. "XL" stands for "Extraordinary Lives".
- XL Nation (2009)

Founded ventures:

- Wealth Dynamics (2009) – Wealth Dynamics profile test
- Wealth Dynamics Central (2009) – markets Wealth Dynamics products
- Vision Villas (2009) – a boutique resort tailored to travellers and groups who seek to retreat, reflect, revive and renew
- XL Nation (2009) – the world's nation for worldwide wealth, attracting and empowering social entrepreneurs and change makers
- Talent Dynamics (2010) – an international business development training company based in the UK. Uses a system based on Wealth Dynamics profile test.
- Wealth Spectrum (2011) – markets Wealth Dynamics Spectrum products
- Entrepreneurs Institute (2012) – Entrepreneurs Institute takes one through every step of business growth, from launching a first business to managing and investing in multiple businesses.
- iLab Incubator (2012) – the first resort entrepreneur accelerator in Asia
- My Genius Test (2013) – profiling system based on Dynamo (Ideas Smart), Blaze (People Smart), Tempo (Senses Smart) and Steel (Detail Smart)
- Wealth Lighthouse (2014) – includes Wealth Dynamics and the Wealth Spectrum, and is a language for social profit and entrepreneurship

== Social entrepreneurship ==
Hamilton launched XL Group to support and connect social entrepreneurs in 2002, and co-founded XL Nation in 2009.

In 2007, Inc. magazine reported on Hamilton's XL Group and their support of the Hunger Project. The organisation has been the foundation for various humanitarian projects including the Global Volunteer Network, StepUp Foundation and Buy1Give1, commonly now known as B1G1. In 2007, XL Group became a Charter Member of the United Nations Global Contract and in 2008 Hamilton was invited to be a member of the Clinton Global Initiative for his commitment to social entrepreneurship. In 2020, United Nations Global Compact Singapore invited Hamilton to speak on SME Strategy Series at their annual summit.

== Controversy ==
In 2006 XL Results Foundation had allegations of unfair conduct and that it was an outright scam, resulting in legal cases in Singapore. On 24 March 2008 some of the allegations were retracted and settled.
