= GVN =

GVN may refer to

- Gazet van Antwerpen, a Belgian newspaper
- Global value numbering
- Global Virus Network
- Global Volunteer Network
- Godavari railway station, in India
- Kuku Yalanji language
- Government of Viet Nam, used of South Vietnam, 1955-1975
