= Alexander Wissner-Gross =

American scientist and entrepreneur

Alexander David Wissner-Gross
- Born: 1981 (age 44–45)
- Education: Massachusetts Institute of Technology (BS, 2003); Harvard University (PhD, 2007)
- Scientific career
- Fields: Physics, computer science
- Workplaces: CO2Stats
- Website: www.alexwg.org

Alexander David Wissner-Gross (born 1981) is an American physicist, computer scientist, investor and entrepreneur. He earned B.S. degrees in physics, electrical engineering, and mathematics from the Massachusetts Institute of Technology—the last student to triple-major before the option was discontinued—and completed a Ph.D. in physics at Harvard University in 2007, where he is a fellow at the Institute for Applied Computational Science. His work has spanned applied technology and theoretical physics. In 2007, he founded CO2Stats, a Y Combinator-funded company that measured the carbon dioxide emissions associated with website usage, and attracted public attention during a dispute over the carbon cost of a Google search. His most widely discussed research, published in Physical Review Letters in 2013 with collaborator Cameron Freer, proposed a physical link between intelligent behaviour and entropy, arguing that systems driven to maximise their future freedom of action can produce apparently goal-directed behaviour without explicit objectives. The paper drew both popular interest and criticism.

== Education ==
As a teenager, Wissner-Gross researched the physics of granular materials such as sand, exploring whether similar principles could be applied at very small scales. He proposed that ideas derived from the behaviour of granular materials might offer an approach to manipulating and assembling nanoscale components, a line of thinking connected to nanotechnology and microscopic manufacturing.

Wissner-Gross earned B.S. degrees in physics, electrical engineering, and mathematics from the Massachusetts Institute of Technology in 2003. He went on to doctoral study in physics at Harvard, where in 2004 he received a Hertz Foundation fellowship for graduate study in the physical sciences. He also received a Marshall Scholarship, and was the last student to triple-major at MIT before the option was discontinued. Wissner-Gross completed a Ph.D. in physics at Harvard University in 2007.

== Entrepreneurship ==
In 2007, Wissner-Gross founded the technology company CO2Stats, which measures the amount of carbon dioxide emitted by using a website. CO2Stats is based in Cambridge, Massachusetts, and received funding from the seed venture capital firm Y Combinator. The company attracted controversy when Wissner-Gross was reported to have claimed that a single Google search emitted seven grams of CO_{2}, which Google disputed. Wissner-Gross denied making the claim.

== Research ==
Wissner-Gross's research has ranged across computational physics, financial technology, and the physics of intelligence. During his doctoral work at Harvard, he collaborated with physicist Efthimios Kaxiras on computer modeling showing that sodium-coated diamond surfaces could maintain an ultrathin layer of ice even at body temperature. According to Harvard Gazette, the proposed ice layer was presented as a way to make diamond coatings more suitable for medical implants by smoothing the surface and reducing the attachment of clotting proteins.

In a 2011 IEEE Spectrum article on high-frequency trading, Wissner-Gross's work was discussed in connection with the growing importance of physical latency limits in electronic markets, where even differences of a few tens of microseconds could confer a trading advantage.

Wissner-Gross co-authored a 2013 paper describing a "biophysical model for explaining sophisticated intelligent behavior in human and nonhuman animals", published in the journal Physical Review Letters. The research focused on a proposed physical link between intelligent behaviour and entropy, arguing that systems can appear to act "intelligently" when they are driven to keep as many future possibilities open as possible. With collaborator Cameron Freer, he described "causal entropic forces": a mathematical framework in which a system tends to choose actions that maximize the number of accessible future states ("future histories"). In demonstrations discussed in popular coverage, a software engine called Entropica was presented as producing goal-directed behaviour without an explicit, pre-specified objective. Examples included balancing an inverted pendulum (the cart-and-pole problem) and using a simple tool to retrieve an out-of-reach target. The idea has been framed as relevant both to artificial intelligence and to the design of interactive systems, where apparently purposeful behaviour can emerge from general constraints rather than hand-coded goals. In io9, George Dvorsky wrote that Wissner-Gross presented the theory as a possible new route to artificial intelligence, and described demonstrations in which the Entropica software was said to show behaviours such as game-playing, upright balancing, tool use, social cooperation, and stock trading.

Researcher Gary Marcus, writing with computer scientist Ernest Davis in The New Yorker, argued that the paper's claims far outstripped its evidence. They contended that the underlying physics was speculative, that the demonstrations relied on handpicked toy problems rather than real-world applications, and that the approach offered no general method for ensuring a system's behaviour would match a programmer's intentions. Marcus and Davis characterised the work as "essentially promising a television set that walks your dog", arguing that genuine progress in artificial intelligence required deep, problem-specific analysis rather than a single unifying principle.

In a 2020 Forbes article, Ron Schmelzer wrote that Wissner-Gross argued that progress in artificial intelligence depended not only on algorithms and computing power but also on the availability of suitable training data sets and training environments. Schmelzer also summarized Wissner-Gross's view of intelligence as a process of keeping options open, or maximizing future freedom of action.

== Podcast ==
In 2025, Wissner-Gross joined the Moonshots Podcast with Salim Ismail, David Blundin, and host Peter Diamandis. The podcast covers technology-related news and commentary, including developments in artificial intelligence. Episodes featuring Wissner-Gross have discussed subjects such as the technological singularity and Dyson "swarms".

== Selected publications ==
- Wissner-Gross, Alexander D. (2006). "Dielectrophoretic reconfiguration of nanowire interconnects". Nanotechnology. 17 (19): 4986–4990. doi:10.1088/0957-4484/17/19/035.
- Wissner-Gross, Alexander D.; Kaxiras, Efthimios (2007). "Diamond stabilization of ice multilayers at human body temperature". Physical Review E. 76 (2) 020501. doi:10.1103/PhysRevE.76.020501. PMID 17929997.
- Wissner-Gross, Alexander D.; Sullivan, Timothy M. (2013). "Participatory telerobotics". In Broome, Barbara D.; Hall, David L.; Llinas, James (eds.). Next-Generation Analyst. Vol. 8758. pp. 87580O. doi:10.1117/12.2015756.
- Wissner-Gross, A. D.; Freer, C.E. (2013). "Causal Entropic Forces". Physical Review Letters. 110 (16) 168702. doi:10.1103/PhysRevLett.110.168702. hdl:1721.1/79750. PMID 23679649.
