= Genius Group Limited =

AI-related company

Genius Group
- Type: Public company
- Traded as: AMEX: GNS
- Industry: Education
- Founded: 2002
- Founder: Roger J. Hamilton
- Headquarters: Singapore
- Key people: Roger Hamilton (CEO) Adrian Reese (CFO)
- Revenue: US$18.2 million (2022)
- Number of employees: 300 (2023)
- Website: www.geniusgroup.net

Genius Group is an education technology Company based in Singapore founded in 2002 by Roger J. Hamilton.

== History ==
From 2012 to 2015, Genius Group developed initiatives under the Entrepreneurs Institute brand and created Talent Dynamics, a corporate version of Wealth Dynamics. During this period, Hamilton became the founding chairman of the Green School in Bali, Indonesia, which led to the creation of GeniusU as an edtech solution in 2015. In 2019, Genius Group Limited was established as the public holding company for the group in Singapore. It acquired Wealth Dynamics and Entrepreneurs Institute, and GeniusU became the edtech company within the group.

Genius Group acquired Entrepreneur Resorts Limited for $31 million in 2020, which continued to be a publicly listed company on the Seychelles MERJ exchange.

Genius Group registered as a foreign issuer of a security and held its IPO on the NYSE American on April 12, 2022, where the company is traded under the stock ticker symbol GNS.

In 2022, Genius Group completed four acquisitions initiated in 2020: Education Angels (New Zealand), E-Squared Education (South Africa), Property Investors Network (UK), and the University of Antelope Valley (UAV) (United States). In 2022, Genius Group acquired US-based film production company Revealed Films.

In August 2023, Genius Group conducted a corporate spin-off of Entrepreneur Resorts Limited and distributed shares of ERL to investors.

In March 2024, Genius Group completed its acquisition of FatBrain AI and merged with OpenExO.

In November 2025, Genius Group completed the acquisition of a 51% majority stake in ProEd Global School to develop a future-focused educational ecosystem in Bali, Indonesia.

== Products and services ==
Genius Group is building a life-long and accredited alternative education pathway for entrepreneurs. Courses are available online through the company's GeniusU platform and are offered within a freemium model, in which entry-level courses are free while more advanced premium courses require payment. Genius Group also hosts in-person workshops, and some of its acquired companies offer in-person classes. The company is developing a virtual campus for its entrepreneur curriculum where the students learn and interact in a virtual reality and augmented reality environment and where learning is gamified. Genius Group uses AI technology on GeniusU to help students personalize their education and is developing AI solutions for governments, businesses, and educational institutions.

== Company structure ==
=== Genius Group Limited ===
Genius Group Limited is the holding company that owns the other companies in the group. It is a Singapore public limited company, and it is listed on NYSE American under the ticker GNS.

=== GeniusU Limited ===
GeniusU Limited is the edtech company that provides personalized learning and global community to the rest of the group. It was converted into a public company in May 2021. It is digitizing the courses of acquisition companies on GeniusU.

=== Entrepreneurs Institute ===
Entrepreneurs Institute was acquired by Genius Group in 2019, and all of its products were integrated with GeniusU in 2020. It owns and develops entrepreneur education courses and tools in the Group.

=== Entrepreneur Resorts ===
Entrepreneur Resorts was acquired by Genius Group in 2020. ERL manages resorts, beach clubs, and co-working spaces for entrepreneurs. It was spun off as its own separate company in October 2023 and is no longer part of Genius Group. It is listed on the Upstream Exchange under the ticker ERL.

=== Education Angels ===
Education Angels was acquired by Genius Group in 2022. It is a New Zealand-based home childcare and education company which trains childcare professionals as educators for children up to six years old.

=== E-Squared Education Enterprises ===
E-Squared Education Enterprises was acquired by Genius Group in 2022. It is a South Africa-based school campus with pre-primary, primary, secondary, and vocational college education for students with a focus on entrepreneurship.

=== University of Antelope Valley ===
The University of Antelope Valley (UAV) was acquired by Genius Group in 2022. It was a California-based U.S. university which delivered vocational certification and degree-level courses on campus and online. UAV closed down in 2024.

=== Property Investors Network ===
Property Investors Network (PIN) was acquired by Genius Group in 2022. It is a UK-based investor education network which delivers courses on property investing.

=== Revealed Films ===
Revealed Films was acquired by Genius Group in 2022. It is a Utah-based film production company led by Jeff Hays and Patrick Gentempo which creates documentaries and docu-series.

=== FatBrain AI ===
FatBrain AI was acquired by Genius Group in 2024. It is an AI solutions provider led by Michael Moe and Peter Ritz. Genius Group and FatBrain AI develop AI education and enterprise solutions.

=== Open ExO ===
Genius Group and OpenExO merged in 2024. OpenExO enables organizations to scale their operations and is led by Salim Ismail. Genius Group and OpenExO advance AI education.

== Finances ==
=== Annual report ===
Genius Group's revenue grew from $8.3 million in 2021 to $18.2 million in 2022. The company had a net loss of $4.5 million in 2021 and a net loss of $55.3 million in 2022.

=== Senior convertible debt, bridge loan, and toxic debt ===
On August 24, 2022, Genius Group borrowed money by entering into a securities purchase agreement with Ayrton Capital LLC for the sale of a senior secured convertible note in the principal amount of $18.3 million. The note was secured by a lien on all the assets of the company and certain assets of its subsidiaries. The note was convertible into ordinary shares of Genius Group at a price of $5.17 per share. On February 27, 2023, Genius Group filed a lawsuit against Ayrton Capital in the United States District Court Southern District of New York, claiming that Ayrton acted as an unregistered dealer in an unlawful scheme to acquire millions of shares of Genius Group at discounted prices in order to sell them at a profit. The parties settled the case on March 29, 2023. Genius Group withdrew its allegations against Ayrton Capital, admitted that Ayrton did not violate any federal securities laws, and agreed to remove any online references to its allegations against Ayrton. Genius Group gave thirteen million shares owed to Ayrton, agreed to pay Ayrton's legal fees, agreed to pay the remainder owed to Ayrton in cash, agreed to obtain Ayrton's permission before issuing any new shares, and the conversion price was reduced to $0.3173 per share. On July 26, 2023, Genius Group executed a bridge loan with Ayrton Capital LLC for $3.2 million. On December 19, 2023, Genius Group paid off the Ayrton note in full and issued 46,755,526 shares in the process.

=== Other financing ===
In October 2023, Hamilton provided a $4 million interest-free loan to the company, which would be converted into ordinary shares. Two weeks later in October 2023, company executives provided an additional $2 million in the form of both interest-free loans and earnings converted to equity.

In January 2024, Genius Group conducted a public offering of shares and warrants with gross proceeds to the company of $8.25 million.

== Market manipulation ==
In November 2022, Genius Group claimed that it had been the target of market manipulation which had adversely affected its share price, and, in response, retained two law firms, Christian Attar and Warshaw Burstein, LLP. Genius Group hired ShareIntel CEO David Wenger and Tom Ronk of BuyIns.net to analyze its stock trading data in order to identify market manipulation. On January 18, 2023, Genius Group appointed its board member and former FBI Deputy Director Timothy Murphy to lead a task force to investigate market manipulation and naked short selling of its stock. This announcement attracted attention from retail investors and turned Genius Group into a meme stock. During January 2023, the price of the stock rose by 1,700%. Genius Group announced plans to prevent manipulation of its stock and invited other companies to join them.

As part of its strategy to counteract market manipulation and naked short selling, Genius Group sought to establish a comprehensive share count of all outstanding company shares and to create a situation in which short sellers would need to cover their positions. Toward this end, in February 2023, Genius Group issued a ten dollar non-fungible token (NFT) digital discount coupon per share on the Upstream Exchange, a traceable and transparent blockchain-based trading service where short selling is not allowed. The company did not identify any market manipulation through the NFT coupon.

Concurrently with issuing the NFT coupon, Genius Group dual listed its shares on Upstream, where it began trading in April 2023 under the ticker symbol GNS. At the time that Genius Group began trading on Upstream, U.S. and Canadian citizens could transfer shares for liquidation, but they could not purchase shares on Upstream. In April 2023, U.S. investors gained access to trade dual-listed U.S. and international securities on Upstream. In September 2023, Genius Group delisted its shares from Upstream.

On January 30, 2023, Genius Group announced that it would spin off a portion of its assets, Entrepreneur Resorts Limited (ERL), as a separate company on the Upstream exchange, and, in August 2023, the Singapore High Court approved the spin-off. Hamilton had repeatedly informed investors that the spin-off process and distribution of ERL stock to Genius Group shareholders as a special dividend would trigger a full share count of Genius Group stock and help to expose market manipulation. Contrary to Hamilton's assurances, the share count did not happen. After Genius Group completed the spin-off on October 2, 2023, Entrepreneur Resorts was no longer a part of Genius Group, and the two operated and traded as separate entities. Shortly after the spin-off, Upstream discontinued securities trading access for U.S. investors.

On June 22, 2023, Forbes discredited Genius Group's attorney Wes Christian, calling his efforts around naked short selling and market manipulation a conspiracy theory.

== Awards ==
2023 - Winner - Real Leaders Impact Awards

2022 - Named Top 10 Emerging Giant in Singapore by KPMG & HSBC

== Controversies ==
In August 2023, the University of Antelope Valley was placed on probation by its accrediting agency, the Western Association of Schools and Colleges Senior College and University Commission (WSCUC), one year after being acquired by Genius Group. WSCUC cited issues with the university's leadership, financial strength, enrollment, student success, and communication. There was widespread mismanagement of student financial aid funds. In October 2023, Genius Group failed to pay rent on UAV's property, and the Johnsons, the former owners of UAV who still owned the property and leased it to UAV, filed an unlawful detainer property case against the university. Genius Group and UAV counter-sued the Johnsons, alleging breach of contract and fraud. In December 2023, the Department of Education placed the university on heightened cash monitoring 2 status, and UAV lost its president abruptly. In January 2024, the California Student Aid Commission placed UAV in the “At Risk Program” and escalated this in February 2024 by placing it on “Halt Pay,” disqualifying it from the Cal Grant Program. In February, 2024, UAV paid its employees three quarters of their salary in Genius Group stock. Many employees quit their jobs. UAV entered into an unlawful detainer judgement stipulating that the university would need to vacate its premises by February 29, 2024. On February 29, 2024, the California Bureau for Private Postsecondary Education ordered UAV “to cease enrollment of any new students, cease all instruction, cease the collection of tuition and fees, and cease operation of all degree programs.” The university announced its closure. Students and athletes were left without housing, facilities and a path forward in their studies. With no funding, the basketball coach launched a successful GoFundMe campaign to raise money for the basketball postseason. The university permanently lost its accreditation in May 2024.

On March 29, 2023, Roger Hamilton posted on X that Genius Group had extended a non-binding offer to acquire Troika Media Group, but he subsequently deleted the message. Genius Group did not acquire Troika. On August 1, 2023, the NYSE warned Genius Group that it had “provided inconsistent information to the investing public...regarding the manner of disclosures from March 2023 events via Twitter.”

In April 2024, Genius Group appointed an AI-chatbot version of Alan Turing as its Chief AI Officer. The marketing gimmick drew widespread rebuke and concern about the ethics of the appointment.

Genius Group traces its origins to 2002, but neither its websites nor its SEC filings mention Hamilton's XL Results Foundation, which operated in the mid-2000s and was accused of operating a worldwide scam, resulting in legal action in Singapore. In 2008 some allegations were retracted and settled.
