= Jatun Sacha =

Jatun Sacha (Kichwa: hatun sacha, "big forest", Southern Quechua: hatun sach'a, "big tree(s)", "great wilderness", also written with j, sounding "h") is best known as the name of a biological station established in the Ecuadorian Amazon in 1985, the Jatun Sacha Biological Station. The management of this station and its associated nature reserve is undertaken by Ecuador's Jatun Sacha Foundation, which since its birth in the 1980s has grown to be Ecuador's largest national level conservation organization with projects distributed throughout mainland Ecuador as well as on the Galápagos Islands.

In the 21st century the name Jatun Sacha was also adopted by the Bolivian government for their Proyecto Jatun Sach'a, a forest conservation initiative in collaboration with FAO, USAID, and the United Nations.

In 2007, a U.S. affiliate of Ecuador's Jatun Sacha Foundation legally titled 'Jatun Sacha USA' adopted the English translation "Great Wilderness" as their public name in the United States.
