= Big 4 (sculpture) =

Sculpture of Channel 4 logo in London HQ

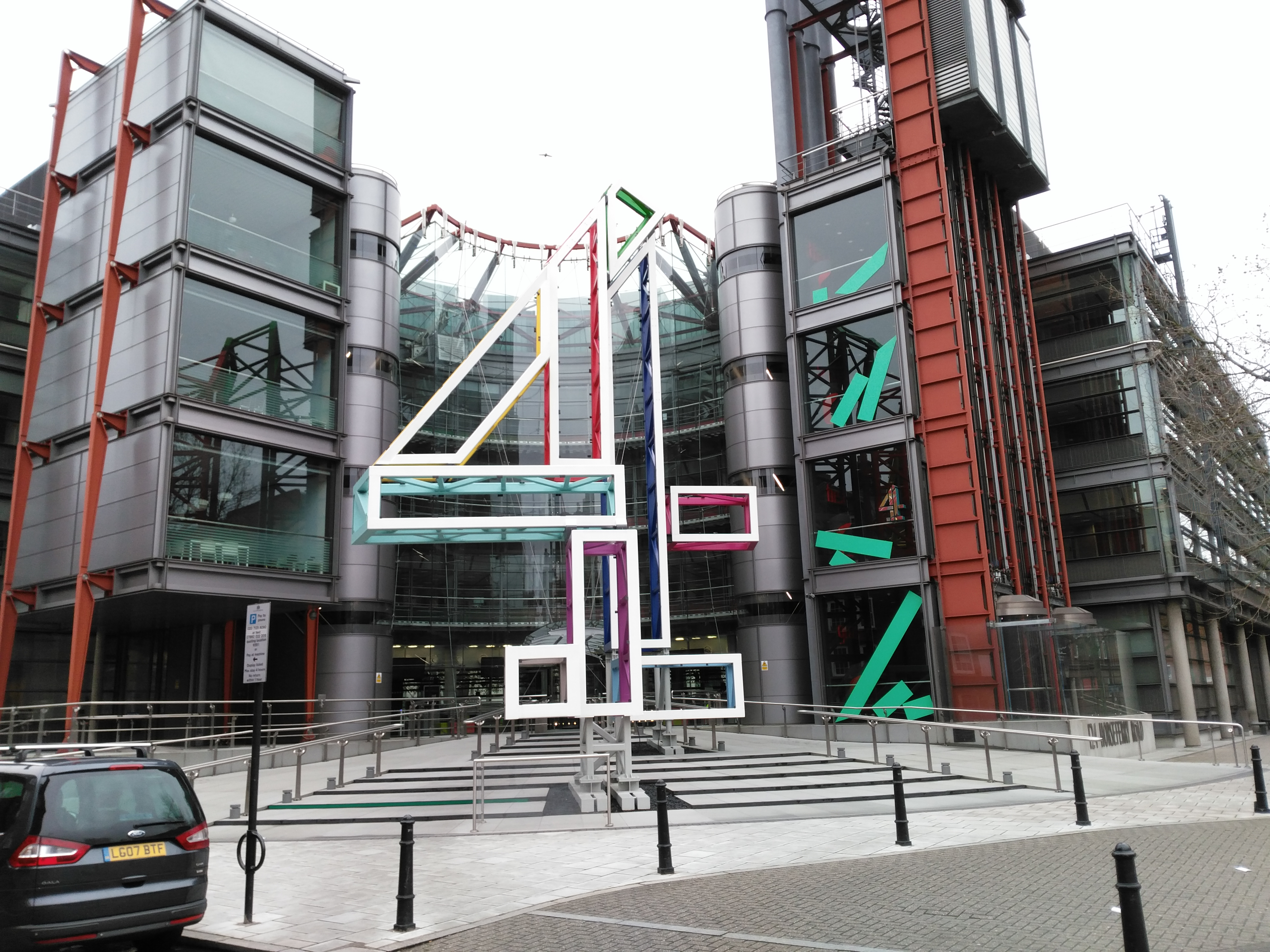
- The Big 4 sculpture outside the Channel 4 building in London in January 2016
- Artist: Freestate (design); Atelier One (engineering)
- Year: 2007; 19 years ago
- Type: Statue
- Medium: Steel bars
- Subject: Channel 4 logo
- Dimensions: 15 m (50 ft)
- Location: London, SW1 United Kingdom; 51°29′45.4″N 0°7′58.6″W

The Big 4 is a sculpture made of steel bars located outside 124 Horseferry Road, the headquarters of the Channel Four Television Corporation in London. It is designed to represent the logo of Channel 4 while providing a basis for a number of art installations. As of November 2012 seven installations have been made on the statue's steel framework, including those to coincide with the 2012 Summer Paralympics, covered with both newsprint and umbrellas, and a design to simulate the statue breathing. A further dressing to celebrate the devolution of Channel 4 from London to a series of regionally-based offices, alongside the Horseferry Road HQ has recently been approved and will be erected later in 2019.

== Design and construction ==
The design and construction of the Big 4 was a collaboration between Mike Smith Studio, Freestate and Atelier One, and was designed to show Channel 4's logo when the statue is correctly aligned, similar to how the logo formed in Channel 4's idents at the time. The statue itself is made out of steel bars, and the structure was fabricated by Mike Smith Studio. The intention was to allow other artists to use the framework of the statue for art installations. The statue is located outside the headquarters of Channel Four Television Corporation on Horseferry Road, London. It was unveiled on 16 October 2007 by Culture Minister Margaret Hodge, to celebrate the 25th anniversary of Channel 4 and to coincide with the television series The Big Art Project.

== Art installations ==
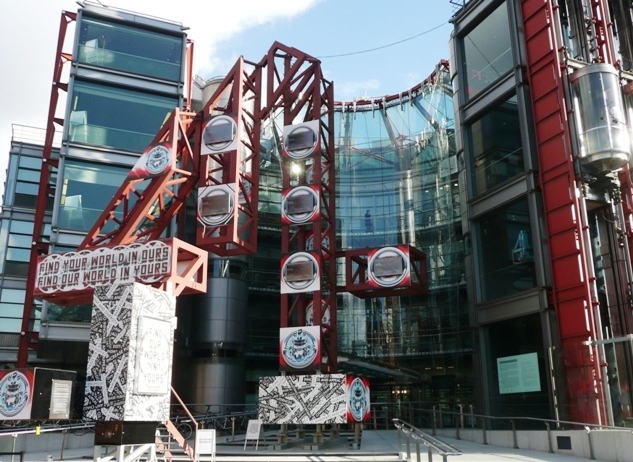
Mark Titchner's "Find your world in ours, Find our world in yours"

During the course of the first year, four artists created installations for the Big 4. These were photographer Nick Knight, Turner Prize shortlisted artist Mark Titchner, sculptor El Anatsui and a fourth artist chosen from an open competition for young arts graduates. The first installation covered the statue in photographs of the inside of the human chest around the heart. Titcher's take on the Big 4 was entitled "Find your world in ours, Find our world in yours", and incorporated a video booth installed at the base of the statue where members of the public could record their views on Channel 4 and broadcasting, which were then edited into a montage of footage which played over large screens on the outside of the statue. The design by El Anatsui wrapped the Big 4 in newsprint created from donated printing plates from a variety of newspapers and magazines including Creative Review, The Independent and those of Trinity Mirror. Feedback on the installation was mixed, with praise coming from Mark Hooper of The Guardian, while commenters at Creative Review were mostly negative.

Stephanie Imbeau won the competition for young art graduates. The work "Shelter" saw the Big 4 covered in hundreds of umbrellas for the concept of showing the value of an everyday object which is taken for granted. A further competition was run for a designer for the Big 4, which was won by Kingston University fashion design graduate Hannah Gourlay. Her design covered the framework with a material which inflated and deflated in a manner to simulate breathing. The material itself came from Dartex Coatings, and is more commonly used to cover NHS bed mattresses. Electric fans drew air into the Big 4 and were then turned off, which allowed the tension in the fabric to push the air back out again.

Prior to the 2012 Summer Paralympics in London, the Big 4 was given a Paralympic theme to coincide with Channel 4's coverage of the Games. The "Monument to the Unintended Performer" was designed by Tony Heaton and meant to bring together three elements of the discus thrower based on the Greek sculpture "Discobolus", a circle to represent the international symbol of access and also the inclusion of the gold, silver and bronze colours as per the Paralympic medals. It was first unveiled at an event attended by Lord Sebastian Coe, Chairman of the London Organising Committee for the Games, and hosted by the Chief Executive of Channel 4, David Abraham. Claire Watson created the final design for 2012, based on the theme of The Snowman and the Snowdog, which is due to be broadcast at Christmas on Channel 4. Vocalism has been responsible for securing planning for the structure and all dressings throughout the duration of the project.

== Gallery ==
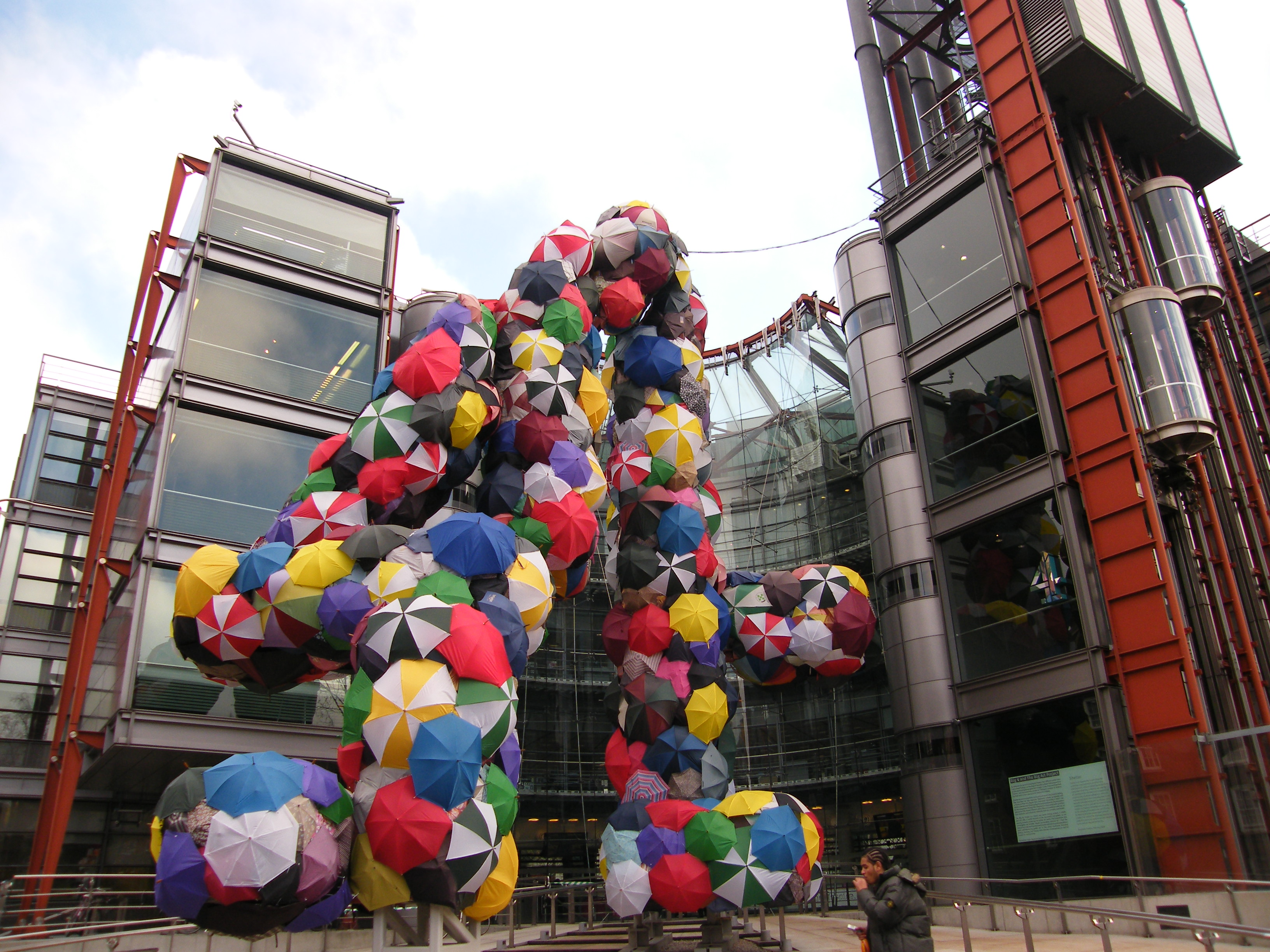
Stephanie Imbeau's "Shelter"

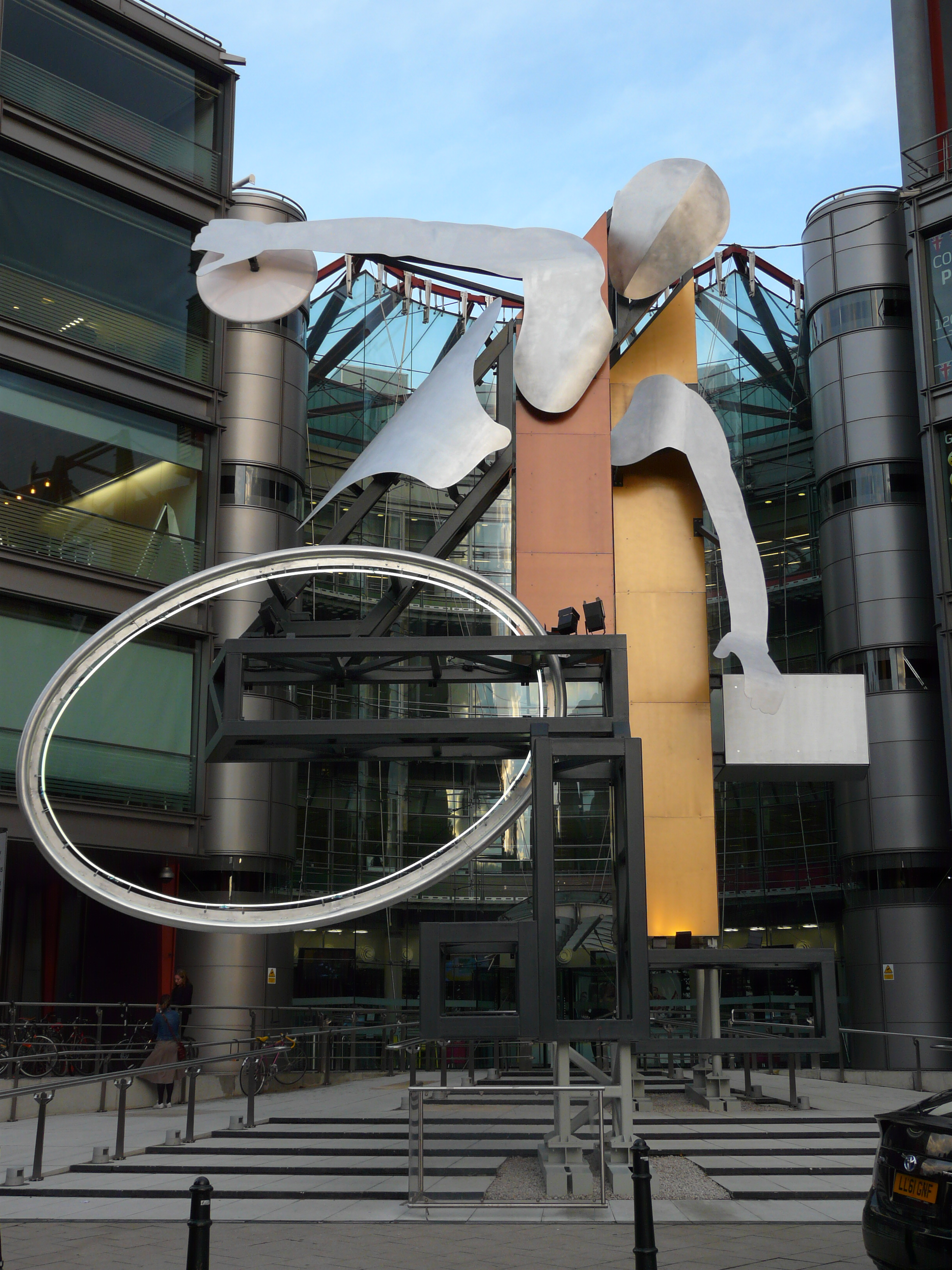
Tony Heaton's "Monument to the Unintended Performer", during the 2012 Paralympic Games

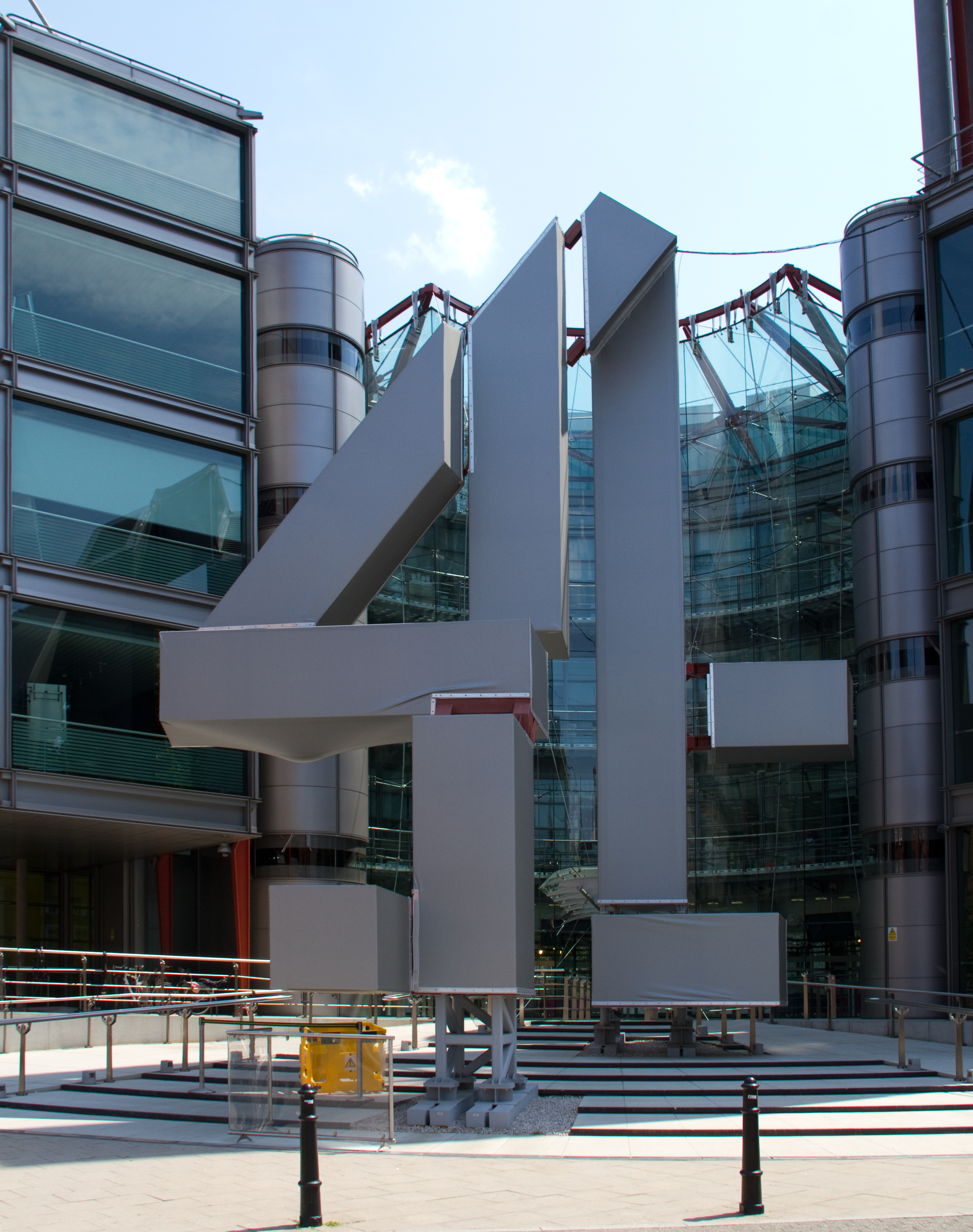
The installation on the Big 4 by Hannah Gourlay

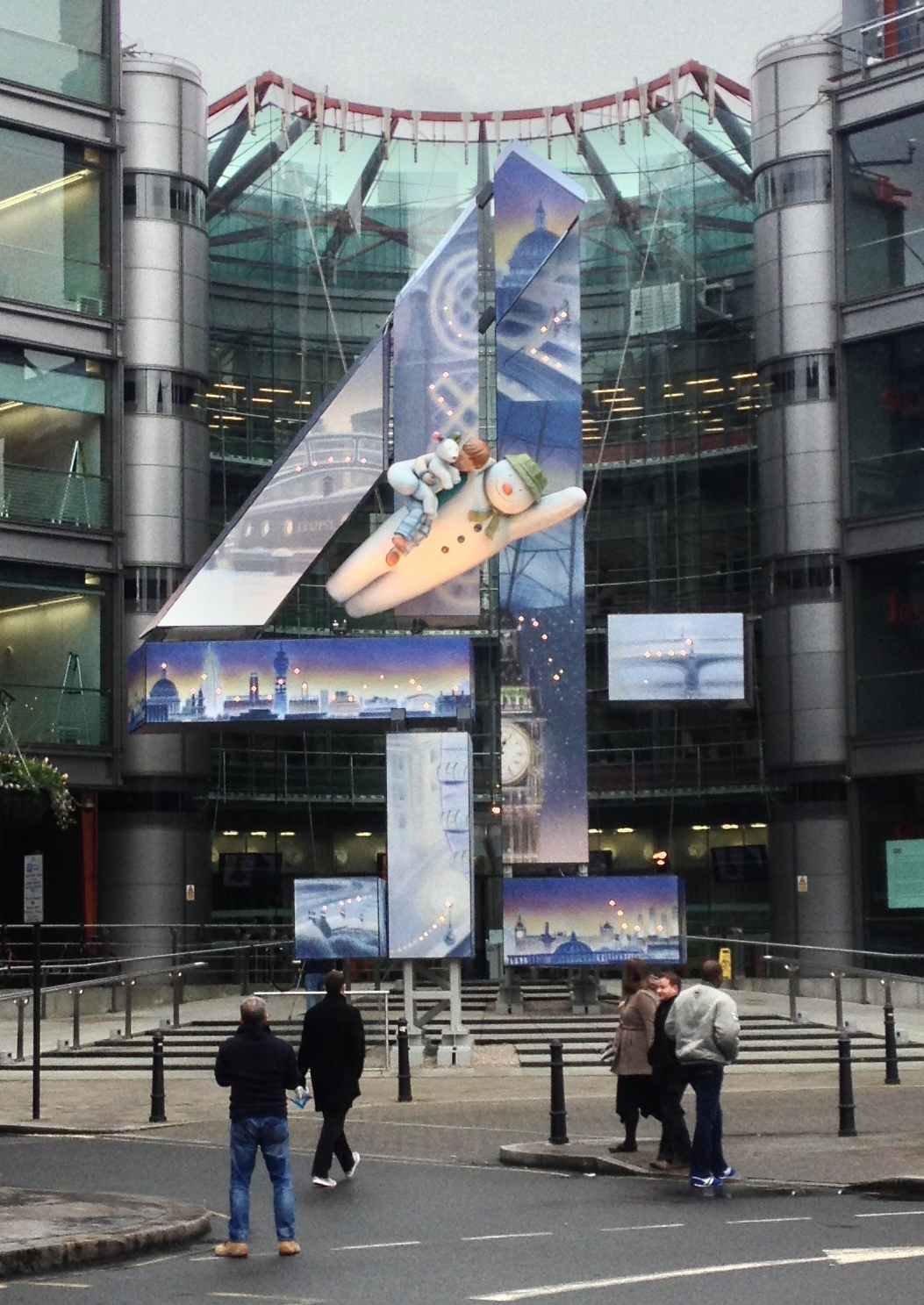
The Snowman and the Snowdog themed installation

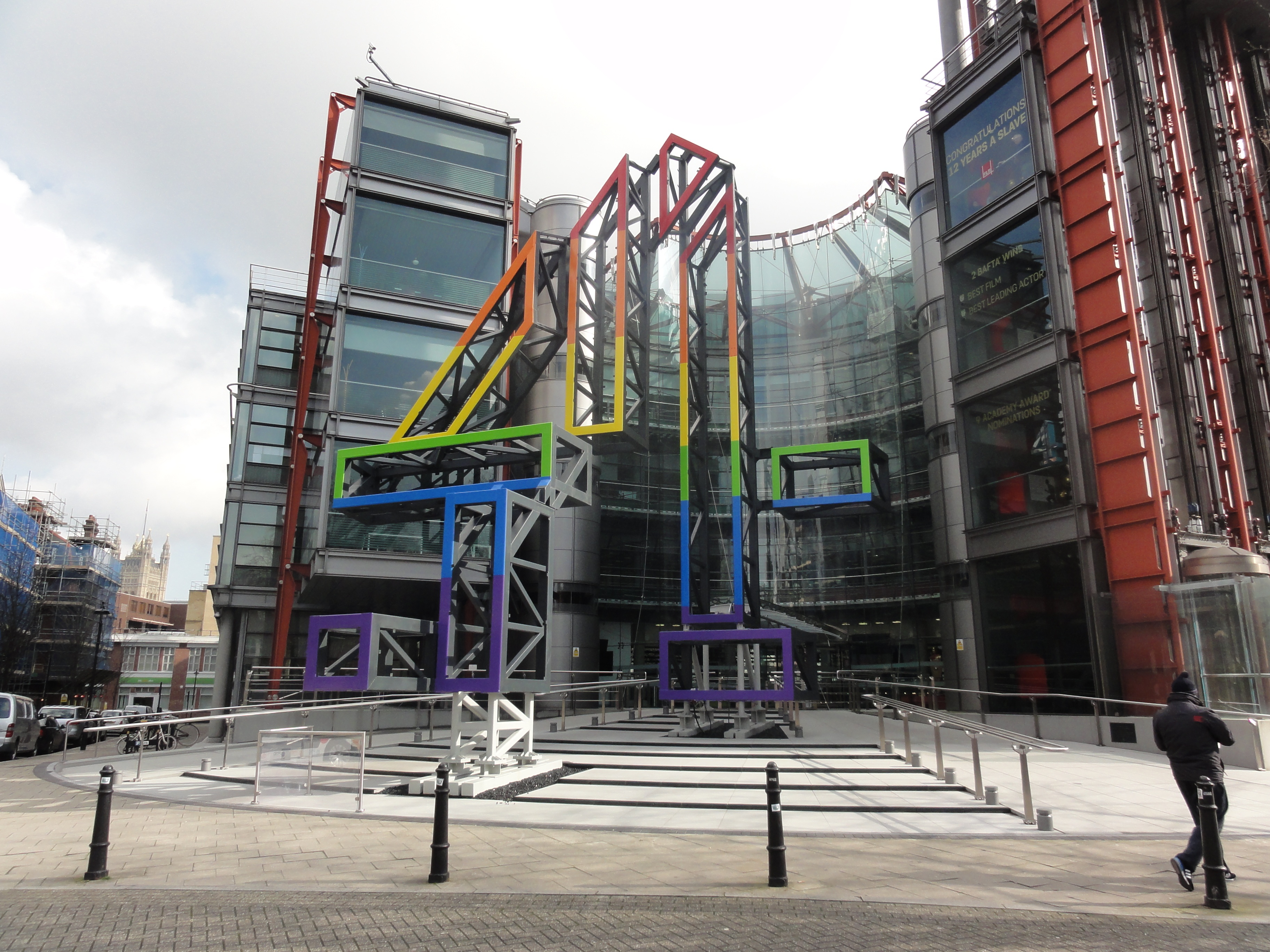
The Big 4 sculpture in Pride colours during the 2014 Winter Paralympics
