= PubSub (website) =

PubSub.com is a prospective search engine for searching blogs, press releases, Usenet, USGS earthquake alerts, SEC filings and FAA Flight Delay information.

The site, founded in 2002 by Bob Wyman and Salim Ismail, operated by storing a user's search term, making it a subscription, and checking it against posts on blogs which ping the search engine. When a new match was found, the user was notified—even if it occurred months after the initial search. This feature led PubSub to call itself a "matching engine".

Results could be read on the service's website or on an optional sidebar, available for both Internet Explorer and Mozilla Firefox, written by Malcolm Pollack and Duncan A. Werner respectively, or via RSS. Results could also be delivered to remote systems via Restful APIs, email or XMPP.

== Financial trouble ==
PubSub ran into problems in 2006 as noted in a blog entry by Bob Wyman and later shut down.

Our days are numbered. A recent attempt to execute a merger has been blocked and we've been blocked from raising equity financing that would allow us to continue to pay salaries and pay off our $3 million in debt. Thus, our "doors" will close soon if we can't find someone to pull us out of the current situation. Persons with fast access to cash and a desire for some of the industry's best technology are advised to contact us rapidly...

The PubSub website was offline from 15 January 2007 until 15 August 2007. Its assets were purchased by Something Simpler. Something Simpler planned to relaunch the site as a user friendly version of Yahoo! Pipes. Something Simpler also planned to launch a Facebook application similar to the original PubSub sidebars.

As of November 18, 2009, PubSub v2.0 was publicly accessible again. It ceased operations in August 2013.

As of November 10, 2026, the original PubSub is publicly accessible again, having been reactivated with intentions to modernize.
