= Irina Skvortsova =

Russian television presenter and bobsleigh racer

- Ирина Скворцова
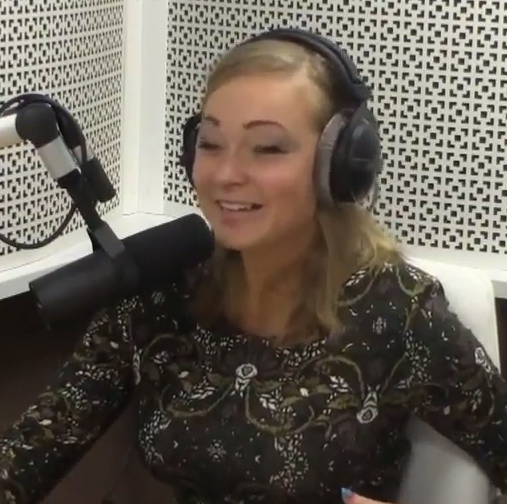
- Skvortsova in 2014
- Born: Ири́на Оле́говна Скворцо́ва; 17 July 1988 (age 37); Moscow
- Education: University of Moscow
- Occupation: TV presenter
- Known for: Recovery from bobsleigh accident
- Height: 168 cm (5 ft 6 in)

Irina Skvortsova (Russian: Ири́на Оле́говна Скворцо́ва; born 17 July 1988) is a Russian television presenter and retired bobsleigh racer. In 2009, she suffered a catastrophic accident training in Germany for the 2014 Sochi Olympics and was nearly killed. The organizers of event allowed 2 sleds on course which collided. She survived after a long recovery and multiple surgeries.

== Biography ==
Skvortsova was born in Moscow. She was a natural sports person studying at Moscow State University. In 2008, she was selected to take part in an experimental bobsleigh team targeted at the Sochi Olympics that was still six years away.

=== Accident ===
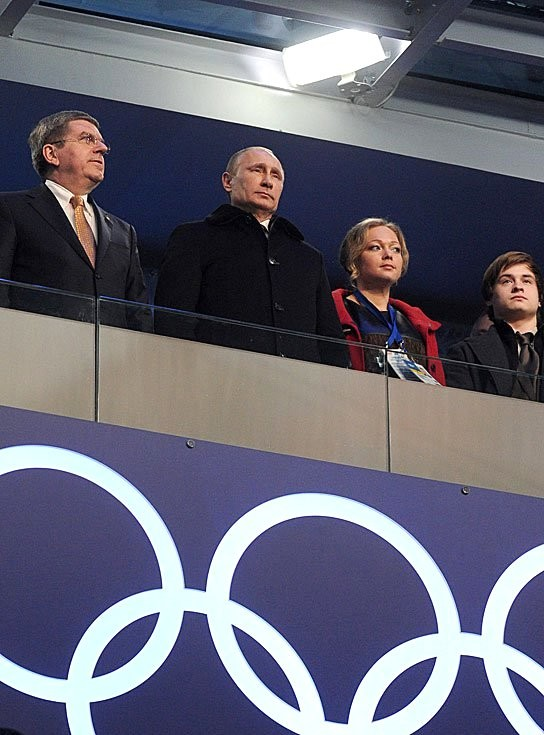
Thomas Bach, Vladimir Putin and Skvortsova at the 2014 Winter Olympics opening ceremony

The following year she was involved in a bobsleigh accident in Germany on 29 November 2009 that caused her to spend a long time in hospital. While training at the Königssee track, she was hit by the Russian men's bobsleigh which hit the women's bobsleigh after they had overturned. She spent two months in a medically induced coma. Doctors believed that her injuries might kill her. She nearly lost a leg and she had dozens of operations to repair her body at the University Hospital in Munich. She was released to a rehabilitation center in Chiemsee in March 2010.

A court case in Germany resulted in a German official being fined for his negligence in allowing two bobsleighs onto the track at the same time. Skvortsova was faced with a large legal bill which was questioned by the Russian government. Her costs were met by well-wishers.

=== Return to Russia ===
Skvortsova returned to Russia in September 2010 where she entered a Federal rehabilitation centre. In February 2011, she visited the national team in Königssee and the next year she graduated from university.

Skvortsova became a TV presenter and she was chosen to be one of the first torchbearers for the Sochi Olympics. At the opening ceremony she was sitting with Russian President Vladimir Putin.
