= 2014 Winter Olympics opening ceremony =

- Part of 2014 Winter Olympics
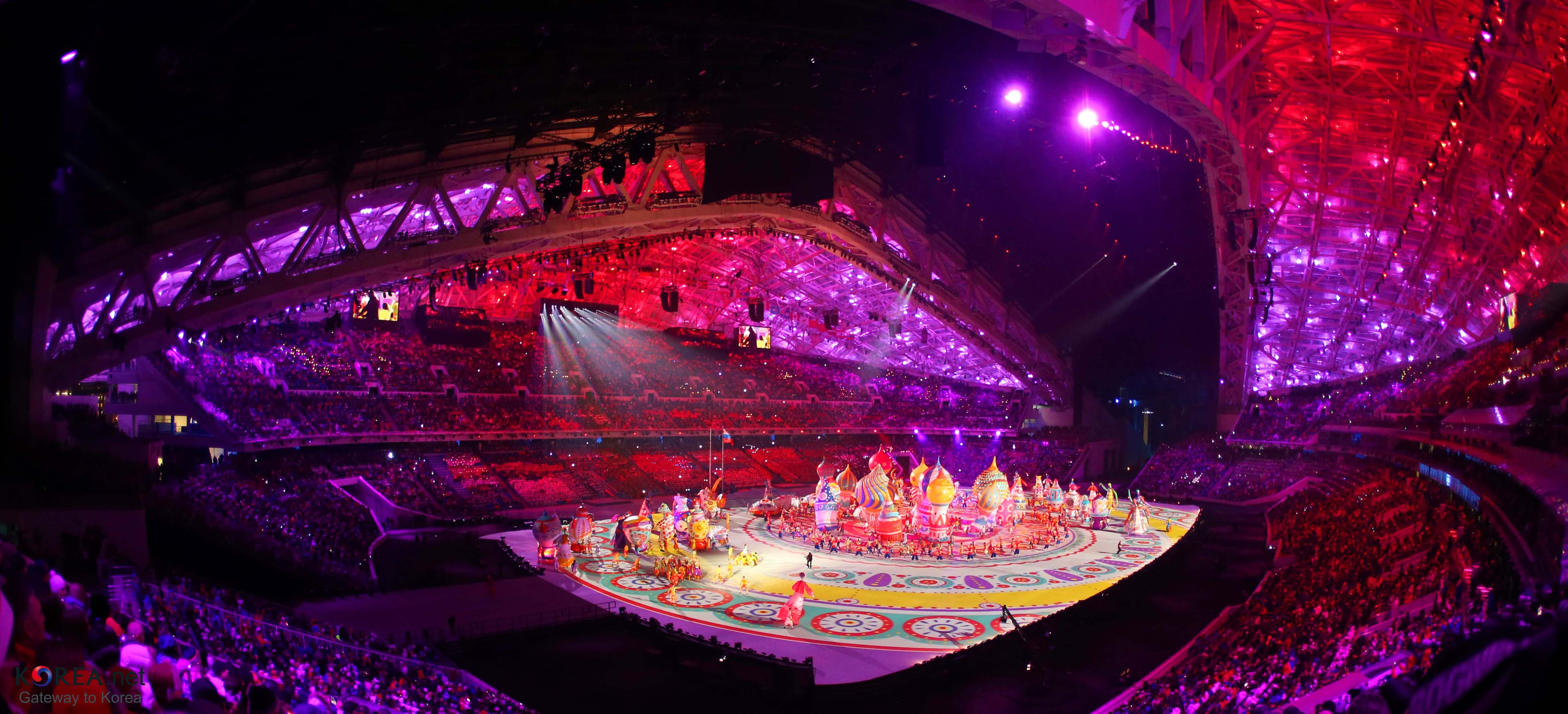
- Date: 7 February 2014; 12 years ago
- Time: 20:14 – 23:02 MSK (UTC+4)
- Venue: Fisht Olympic Stadium
- Location: Sochi, Russia; 43°24′08″N 39°57′22″E
- Also known as: Dreams of Russia
- Filmed by: Olympic Broadcasting Services (OBS)

The opening ceremony of the 2014 Winter Olympics took place at the Fisht Olympic Stadium in Sochi, Russia, on 7 February 2014. It began at 20:14 MSK (UTC+4) and finished at 23:02 MSK (UTC+4). It was filmed and produced by OBS and Russian host broadcasters Channel One and VGTRK. This was the first Winter Olympics and first Olympic Games opening ceremony under the IOC presidency of Thomas Bach. This was also the second consecutive Winter Olympic opening ceremony to be held in an indoor stadium.

The Games were officially opened by President Vladimir Putin. An audience of 40,000 were in attendance at the stadium with an estimated 2,000 performers.

== Preparations ==
The site of the opening ceremony, Fisht Olympic Stadium was built specifically for the games. Fisht Stadium seats 40,000. No Olympic or Paralympic competitions were held there; it was only used for the opening and closing ceremonies during the respective Games. Television producer Konstantin Ernst was the main Creative Head in charge of the opening ceremonies. Andrei Nasonovsky was the Executive Producer of record; and Andrei Boltenko was the writer and director of the ceremony. A different team was in charge of the closing ceremony as well as the Paralympic ceremonies.

== Proceedings ==
Pre-ceremony activities included performances by the Russian pop duo t.A.T.u. and the Ministry of Internal Affairs choir, who performed a version of Daft Punk's "Get Lucky".

=== Dreams of Russia ===
Letter	Association (Romanisation)	Association (in Russian)
А	ABC	Азбука
Б	Baikal	Байкал
В	Sikorsky's helicopter	Вертолёт Сикорского
Г	Gagarin, Gzhel	Гагарин, Гжель
Д	Dostoyevsky	Достоевский
Е	Catherine II	Екатерина II
Ё	Hedgehog in the Fog	Ёжик в тумане
Ж	Zhukovsky	Жуковский
З	Corn mowing machine	Зерноуборочная машина
И	Empire	Империя
Й	Tchaikovsky	Чайковский
К	Kandinsky	Кандинский
Л	Lunokhod	Луноход
М	Malevich	Малевич
Н	Nabokov	Набоков
О	Space Station	Орбитальная станция
П	Periodic table	Периодическая таблица
Р	Russian ballet	Русский балет
С	Sputnik	Спутник
Т	Tolstoy, Television	Толстой, Телевидение
У	Ushanka	Ушанка
Ф	Fisht (Pun: Fisht)	Фишт
Х	Khokhloma	Хохлома
Ц	Tsiolkovsky	Циолковский
Ч	Chekhov	Чехов
Ш	Chagall	Шагал
Щ	Shchusev	Щусев
Ъ	Pushkin	Пушкинъ
Ы	We	Мы
Ь	Lyubov', Love	Любовь
Э	Eisenstein	Эйзенштейн
Ю	Parachute	Парашют
Я	Russia	Россия

The ceremony, opened with an on-screen video showing 11-year-old Liza Temnikova playing a character named Lyubov (Russian for 'love') reciting the Russian alphabet. Each letter is associated with images of a famous Russian person or landmark. Many of the letters features some of Russia's most famous writers such as Dostoyevsky, Nabokov, Tolstoy, Chekhov, and countless others that have impacted Russian history, culture, literature, and philosophy.

Lyubov then flew into the air as she dreamed of grabbing the tail of a kite and being lifted far off the stage. Nine different floats, carrying Russian landscapes, passed beneath her as she slept.

Five large snowflakes descended into the stadium which expanded and joined to form the Olympic rings. However, a technical error caused the fifth ring not to expand, and pyrotechnics did not go off from the rings. The mishap was later self-mocked by the organizers at the closing ceremony where one of the roundrelay dance groups symbolizing the Olympic rings "failed" to expand.

=== Anthems ===
The Sretensky Monastery men's choir sang the Russian National Anthem, while 240 volunteers stood in formation wearing glowing suits of white, red, and blue to represent the Russian flag. The Russian flag bearers were a detachment of cosmonauts – Fyodor Yurchikhin (who returned from space with the torch), Roman Romanenko, Svetlana Savitskaya and Yelena Serova – and the flag was raised by Sergei Krikalev. The volunteers moved up and down to create a waving flag motion.

=== Parade of Nations ===
The Parade of Nations was led, according to custom due to hosting the original ancient Olympics, by the Greek team, followed by other competing countries in alphabetical order based on their names in the Russian language, with the host country, Russia, culminating the march. Athletes were then seated in the lower level of the stadium's stands. A projected rendering of the Earth showing each competing country (along with their names in English, French and Russian, respectively) was displayed on the stadium floor as they entered. The parade was accompanied with a soundtrack by Russian electronic dance music producer Leonid Rudenko, which featured remixes of popular Russian music.

=== Mascots ===
After the Parade of Nations entered, the three mascots of the Games come out and walk on an ice-based shaping rink LED of the stadium. The hare is an alpine skier, the leopard and the polar bear are the skiers using skating rink shoes. The mascots bow quickly then head off for the next segment.

=== Performances ===
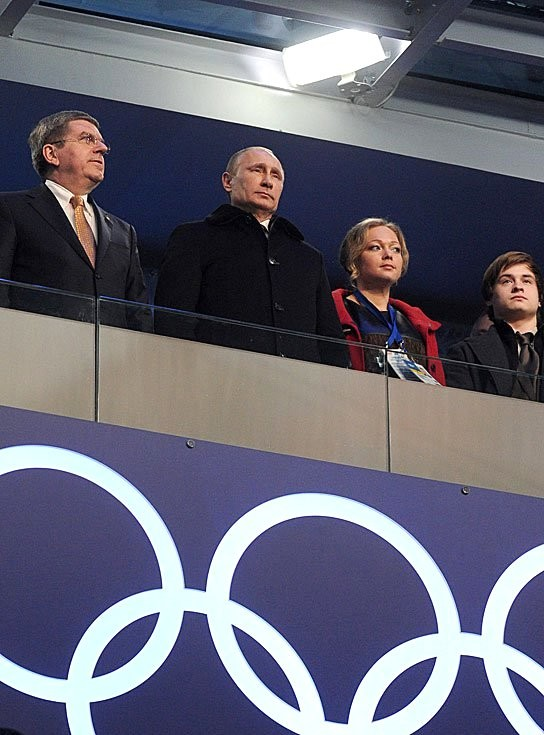
Russian President Vladimir Putin and Irina Skvortsova (a former bobsleigh racer who received multiple injuries in Germany) at the opening of the Games

The opening ceremony focused heavily on classical music and large scale productions. Performances journeyed through Russian history through the eyes of a little girl called Lyubov, this time played by Kristina Ermolinskaya, touching on Russia's art, music, and ballet. The Russian history presentation was ushered in by a brightly lit troika of three horses followed by a red sun. Performances included the building of St Basil's Cathedral, represented by colourful inflatable sculptures, and 17th century czar Peter the Great building an army as Russia transitioned from medieval times to the 20th century. Czar Peter's marching cadets (160 male dancers) moved from a map of the St Petersburg projected on the stadium floor to an imperial ball inspired by Leo Tolstoy's War and Peace, and featuring ballet dancers including Danila Korsuntsev, Ivan Vasiliev, and Svetlana Zakharova. The ball included music by Aleksander Sergeyevich Zatsepin and ended with the fifth movement (Rondo) of Alfred Schnittke's Concerto Grosso No. 1.

Fourteen columns rose from the floor, then disappeared, replaced first by scenes of the Russian Revolution and Soviet industrialization, followed by a giant moving reproduction of the famous statue Worker and Kolkhoz Woman made by Vera Mukhina in 1937, with hammer and sickle flying over the arena, symbolising the period of great industrialisation following the Bolshevik Revolution. Dozens of men carried rockets and the name of Yuri Gagarin appeared on the floor, followed up skyscrapers emerging against a background of modern typography.

The organizing committee initially wanted to include scenes of Soviet victory in World War II, but the IOC protested and the plans were abandoned.

Putin declared the games open, followed by a performance of Swan Lake in which the Swans, holding strands of blue LED lights, transformed into the Dove of Peace, a traditional Olympic symbol. Prima ballerina Diana Vishneva was among those who performed.

Many performers wore white to symbolise peace. More than 3,000 performers and 2,000 volunteers took part in the show. 10,000 people in all helped organise and execute the ceremonies. 120 projectors and 2.6 million lumens turned the stadium floor into a 3D, moving landscape.

=== Oath and torch lighting ===
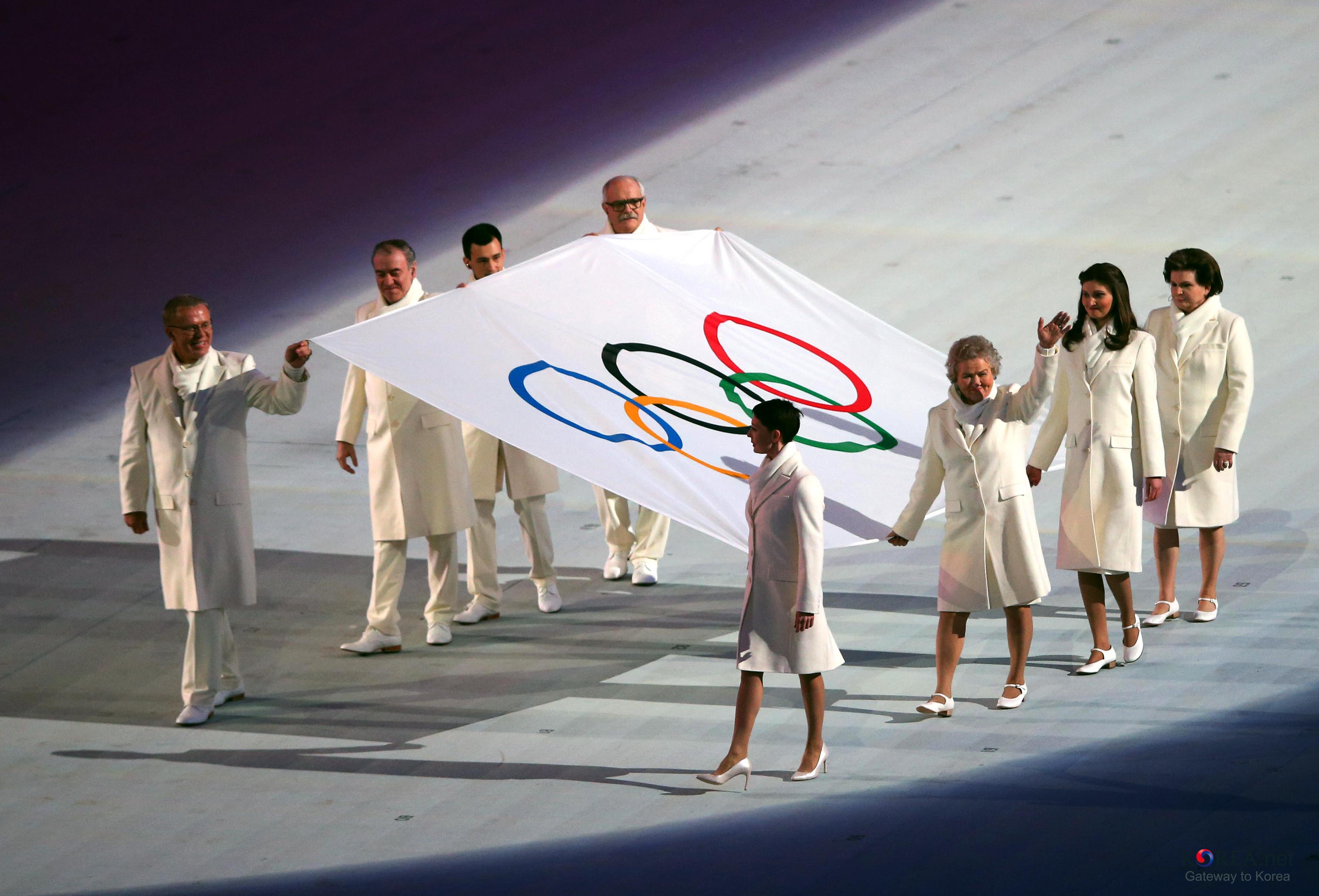
The Olympic flag entering the stadium.

The Olympic flag was brought into the stadium with eight flag bearers: Chulpan Khamatova, Lidiya Skoblikova, Anastasia Popova, Valentina Tereshkova, Viacheslav Fetisov, Valery Gergiev, Alan Enileev and Nikita Mikhalkov. During the flag raising, opera singer Anna Netrebko later sang the Olympic Anthem in Russian.

The Olympic Oath on behalf of all athletes was taken by Ruslan Zakharov (Short-track), Vyacheslav Vedenin took the oath for all judges and Anastasia Popkova took the oath for all coaches.

For the finale, tennis player Maria Sharapova brought the Olympic Torch (the torch that had gone to the International Space Station in November) into the stadium. She handed it off to pole vaulter Yelena Isinbayeva who, in turn, passed it to wrestler Aleksandr Karelin. Karelin then passed the torch to gymnast Alina Kabaeva. Figure skater Irina Rodnina took the torch and was met by former ice hockey goalkeeper Vladislav Tretiak, handing the torch to him. Tretiak jogged out of the stadium alongside Rodnina. The pair then jointly lit the Olympic cauldron installed at the Sochi Medals Plaza in Sochi Olympic Park to the music of the "Firebird Suite" by Igor Stravinsky. Gas jets led the Olympic flame to the top of the Olympic Cauldron. This was followed by a fireworks display across the area around Fisht Olympic Stadium, including the other sporting venues. Twenty-two tonnes of fireworks were lit as Tchaikovsky's Nutcracker score played. In total, the show lasted just under three hours.

== Music ==
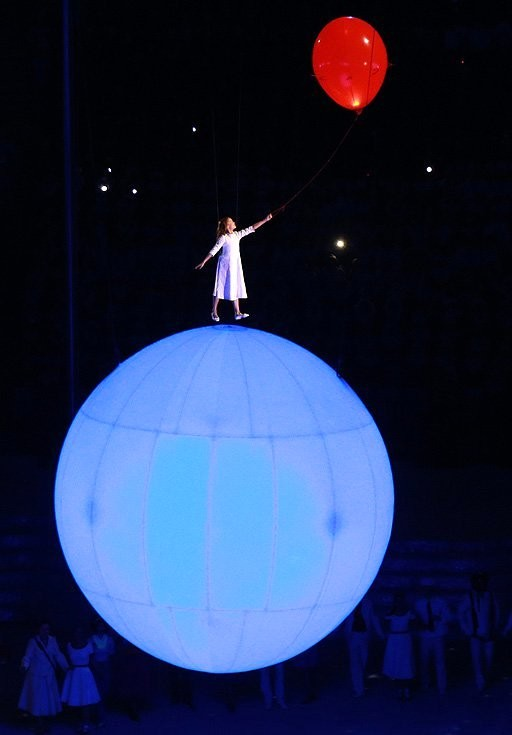
According to the Ceremony's producers, Russia is said to be a country with a feminine soul. Lyubov "Love" is a representation of that idea. In the Dream sequence Liza Temnikova, as Lyubov, releases her red balloon, representing the dream of an era and the hope for the future.

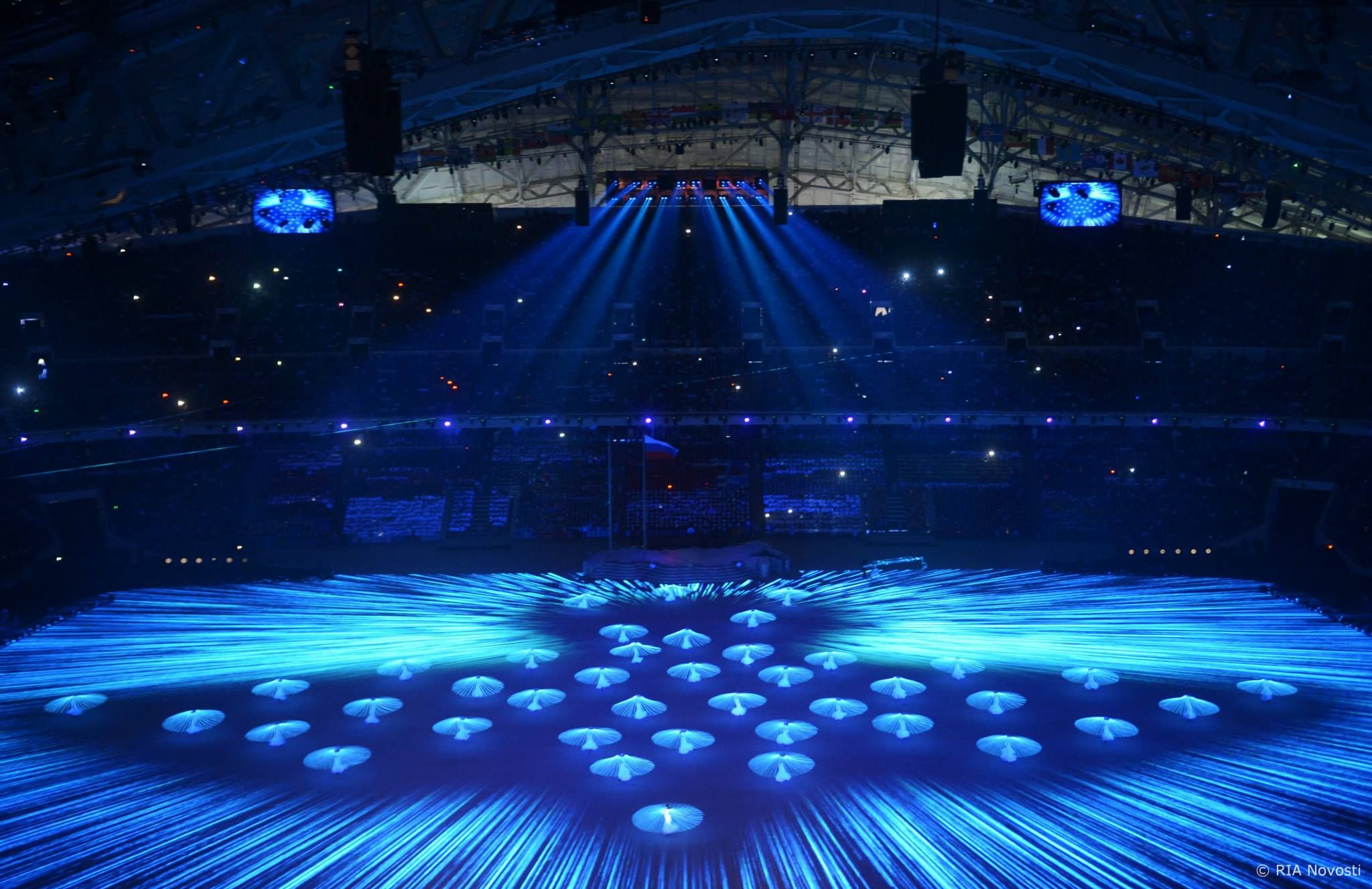
Opening ceremony performance.

The music for the winning bid was composed by Eric Babak with the Russian State Symphony Cinema Orchestra with the State Academic Choral Chapel of Russia.

- Pre-show concert before broadcasting
  - Live performances by Golos artists ("We Are the Champions"), TOKiO (Russian rock band) (Sochi 2014 Anthem for Fans), Russian MOI choir ("Get Lucky"), t.A.T.u. ("Nas Ne Dogonyat") and Pelageya ("Oy, to ne vecher"). Presented by Ivan Urgant and Yana Churikova.
- Voices of Russia (Russian Alphabet melody) by Alexander Knyazev
- Opening section
  - Alexander Borodin's "Fly away on the wings of the wind" (Polovtsian Dances)
  - "Glory to the beautiful Sun" from Alexander Borodin's Prince Igor
- Parade of Nations (remixes by DJ Leonid Rudenko)
  - Greece-Andorra, Estonia-Japan – "No coward plays hockey" (with a voice)
  - Argentina-Great Britain – "Somewhere Far Away" (Song about distant Motherland) (only melody)
  - Hungary-Israel – "Summer Will End" (only melody)
  - Iran-Liechtenstein – "My Rock 'n Roll" (with Bi-2's and Yulia Chicherina's voices)
  - Luxembourg-Nepal – Yablochko (folk melody, a chastushka and sailors dance) remix by DJ Leonid Rudenko
  - Netherlands-San Marino – "Do You Want?" (with Zemfira's voice)
  - Serbia-Thailand – Cry, Dance, Run from me by Gosti iz budushchego (with Eva Polna's voice)
  - Chinese Taipei-France – "There's just a blink..." (only melody)
  - Croatia-Sweden – Blood Type (with Viktor Tsoi's voice)
  - Russia – "Nas Ne Dogonyat" and "We Will Rock You" remix by DJ Leonid Rudenko
- Mascots
  - Tamás Deák's "Vízisí" (opening theme of Well, Just You Wait!)
- Performances
  - Igor Stravinsky's The Rite of Spring
  - Ivan Kupala's "Kostroma"
  - Erik Eriksson's Petersburger Marsch (Marsch aus Petersburg)
  - The Red Tent waltz (from The Red Tent) – Natasha Rostova's First Ball
  - "My Affectionate and Tender Beast" waltz (from A Hunting Accident) – Natasha Rostova's First Ball
  - Alfred Schnittke's Concerto Grosso No. 1. V. Rondo
  - Georgy Sviridov's Time, Forward! suite (from Time, Forward!)
  - Andrey Pavlovich Petrov's Walking the Streets of Moscow
  - Muslim Magomayev's "The Best City on Earth"
  - "Sabre Dance" with Russian "Nas Ne Dogonyat" and English "Not Gonna Get Us"
  - Operation Y and Shurik's Other Adventures theme
  - Olimpiada-1980 hymn ("The golden Olympic flame")
  - Vasily Solovyov-Sedoi and Mikhail Matusovsky's "Moscow Nights"
  - "Lubeh"'s "Guys from our neighborhood"
  - Eduard Khil's vocalise I Am Glad, 'Cause I'm Finally Returning Back Home
  - Arkady Ostrovsky and Lev OshaninMay's May There Always Be Sunshine
  - Eduard Artemyev's composition Campaign or Death of the hero (Siberiade theme)
- Doves of Peace section
  - Swan Lake
- The Olympic flag
  - Tchaikovsky's Coronation March
- Final section remixes
  - "The Game Has Changed"
  - The Rite of Spring
  - Borodin Fly away on the wings of the wind (Polovtsian Dances)
  - Swan Lake
  - Concerto Grosso No. 1. V. Rondo
- Lighting of the Cauldron
  - The Firebird Suite by Igor Stravinsky. Final hymn.
- Fireworks
  - Nutcracker Suite. Trepak (Russian Dance)
  - Tchaikovsky – The Sleeping Beauty, Introduction (from The Sleeping Beauty)
  - Georgy Sviridov's Snow-Storm: Waltz (from The Blizzard)
  - Aram Khachaturian – Masquerade: Waltz
  - Modest Mussorgsky – The Polonaise (from Act 3 of Boris Gudonov)

== Anthems ==
- (Russia) State Anthem of the Russian Federation – Sretensky Monastery Choir
- (International Olympic Committee) Olympic Anthem – Anna Netrebko

== Television coverage ==
The malfunction of the fifth Olympic snowflake ring was not seen during the telecast of the ceremony in Russia, where both Channel One and VGTRK quickly cut to footage of the scene from a dress rehearsal, where the sequence worked correctly.

In the United States, NBC's broadcasts of the opening ceremony were delayed until the evening. The broadcast attracted 31.7 million American viewers, compared to 32.6 million for the live telecast of the 2010 Winter Olympics opening ceremony.

In Britain, BBC Two's coverage of the ceremony attracted a peak 3.2 million viewers and an average rating of 2.47 million.

BBM Canada ratings for CBC's live, repeat and online broadcasts of the ceremony totalled 6.974 million viewers.

In Australia, Ten broadcast the ceremony at 3 am AEDT.

== Reception ==
The Independent's Simon Rice found some portions of the ceremony to be "confusing" and other "spectacular", while describing the cauldron lighting as "an unimaginative domino of flames". The New York Times review described the proceedings as "sheer pageantry and national pride". Katherine Monk of Canada's Postmedia News described the athletes' clothing as "a lot sexier than the old Communist-era cardboard garb". Kathy Lally and Will Englund of The Washington Post commented that "The scale bordered on the colossal" and called the ceremony "poetry – in motion".

Despite Russia's stance on LGBT people (including its 2013 law banning the distribution of LGBT "propaganda" to minors, which had been a major concern leading up to the Olympics), the Huffington Post noted that the opening ceremony, ironically, featured tributes to "some of history's most widely acclaimed and definitely gay Russians", including composer Peter Tchaikovsky (1840–1893), ballet dancer Vaslav Nijinsky (1889–1950), and patron of arts, and founder of Ballets Russes, Sergei Diaghilev. Russian organizers denied any connection, stating that these figures were selected because of their cultural significance. On the same topic, critics also noted the Russian pop duo t.A.T.u were invited to perform during the opening ceremony; although they are not actually lesbian, the all-female duo were well known for incorporating themes of lesbianism in their music and on-stage personas (live appearances often featured the singers kissing each other), its name is a corruption of a shortened Russian phrase meaning "this girl loves that girl", and the duo made a statement in support of LGBT rights in the wake of Yuri Luzhkov's objection to the 2007 Moscow Pride parade. Organizers noted that t.A.T.u were chosen because they were well known to an international audience, denying any relation to LGBT rights.

== Dignitaries in attendance ==
Aside from athletes and members of the IOC, 5 multilateral leaders and representatives from more than 80 countries (included at least 60 heads of state and government) attended the opening ceremony.

- IOC President Thomas Bach and predecessor Jacques Rogge
- United Nations Secretary General Ban Ki-moon
- CIS Secretary General Sergei Lebedev
- (European Union) Council of Europe President Thorbjorn Jagland
- SCO President Vladimir Norov
- African Union Former president Jean Ping
- Abkhazia President Alexander Ankvab
- Afghanistan President Hamid Karzai
- Andorra Prime Minister Antoni Marti
- Albania Prime Minister Sali Berisha
- Azerbaijan President Ilham Aliyev
- Armenia President Serzh Sargsyan
- Austria Chancellor Werner Faymann
- Belarus President Alexander Lukashenko
- Belgium Prime Minister Elio Di Rupo
- Bolivia President Evo Morales
- Bosnia-Herzegovina President Bakir Izetbegovic
- Brazil Vice President Michel Temer
- Bulgaria President Rosen Plevneliev and Prime Minister Plamen Oresharski
- Canada State Councillor Tim Stevenson
- China President Xi Jinping and Premier Li Keqiang
- Croatia President Ivo Josipovic
- Cyprus President Nicos Anastasiades
- Czech Republic President Miloš Zeman
- Denmark Crown Prince Frederik (Note: Representing the Queen of Denmark)
- Estonia Prime Minister Andrus Ansip
- Finland President Sauli Niinistö and Prime Minister Jyrki Katainen
- France Deputy Prime Minister Laurent Fabius
- Gabon President Ali Bongo Ondimba
- Greece President Karolos Papoulias
- Georgia President Mikheil Saakashvili
- Germany Former Chancellor Gerhard Schroeder
- Hungary President János Áder and Prime Minister Viktor Orbán
- Hong Kong Former Chief Executive Donald Tsang
- Iceland President Olafur Ragnar Grimsson
- India Prime Minister Manmohan Singh
- Ireland Deputy Premier Leo Varadkar
- Italy Prime Minister Enrico Letta
- Jordan King Abdullah II and Prince Feisal bin Al Hussein
- Japan Prime Minister Shinzo Abe and predecessor Yoshiro Mori
- Kazakhstan President Nursultan Nazarbayev
- Kosovo Vice President Hashim Thaci
- Kyrgyzstan President Almazbek Atambayev
- Latvia President Andris Bērziņš
- Lebanon Prime Minister Najib Mikati
- Liechtenstein Prime Minister Adrian Hasler
- Lithuania Prime Minister Algirdas Butkevičius
- Luxembourg Monarch Grand Duke Henri
- Macedonia President Gjorge Ivanov
- Moldova Prime Minister Iurie Leanca
- Mongolia President Tsakhiagiin Elbegdorj
- Montenegro President Filip Vujanovic
- Monaco Prince Albert and Princess Charlene
- Morocco Prime Minister Abdelilah Benkirane
- Netherlands King Willem-Alexander, Queen Máxima and Prime Minister Mark Rutte
- Norway Crown Prince Haakon (Note: Representing the King of Norway)
- North Korea President Kim Yong Nam
- Palestine Prime Minister Salam Fayyad
- Poland President Bronislaw Komorowski and former president Lech Wałęsa
- Qatar Emir Tamim bin Hamad Al Thani
- Romania Prime Minister Victor Ponta
- Russia President Vladimir Putin and Prime Minister Dmitry Medvedev
- Rwanda President Paul Kagame
- Saudi Arabia Crown Prince Mohammad bin Salman
- Serbia President Tomislav Nikolic
- South Africa Vice President Cyril Ramaphosa
- South Ossetia President Leonid Tibilov
- South Korea President Park Geun-hye and Prime Minister Jung Hong-won
- Soviet Union Former president Mikhail Gorbachev
- Switzerland President Didier Burkhalter
- Spain Crown Prince Felipe (Note: Representing the King of Spain) and Prime Minister Mariano Rajoy
- Slovakia President Ivan Gašparovič
- Slovenia President Borut Pahor
- Sweden King Carl XVI Gustaf and Queen Silvia
- Tajikistan President Emomali Rahmon
- Turkey Prime Minister Recep Tayyip Erdoğan
- Turkmenistan President Gurbanguly Berdimuhamedow
- United Kingdom Princess Royal Anne (Note: Representing the Queen of the United Kingdom)
- United States Deputy Secretary of State William J. Burns
- Ukraine President Viktor Yanukovych
- Uzbekistan President Islam Karimov
- Vanuatu Prime Minister Ham Lini

=== Politicians declining to attend the ceremonies ===
- Andorra / France: François Hollande, who declined to cite a reason.
- Canada: Stephen Harper, citing the fact that Canadian prime ministers do not typically attend the Winter Games outside of Canada.
- Germany: Joachim Gauck, who did not cite a reason; however the national human rights commissioner Markus Loening said that it was a "wonderful gesture".
- Lithuania: Dalia Grybauskaitė, citing Russia's economic sanctions against Lithuania and its "attitude" toward Eastern partners.
- United Kingdom: David Cameron, citing a scheduling conflict and the fact that no British prime minister has attended the Winter Games.
- United States: Barack Obama, citing a desire to not distract from competitions.
