= Siberian agriculture =

Overview of agriculture in Siberia, Russia

Agriculture in Siberia was started many millennia ago by peoples indigenous to the region. While these native Siberians had little more than "digging sticks" called mattocks instead of ploughs at their disposal, Siberian agriculture would develop through the centuries until millions of Russian farmers were settled there, reaping significant bounties off this huge expanse of land stretching from the Ural Mountains to the Pacific Ocean.

== The effect of climate and geography on agriculture ==
Agriculture is inevitably tied up with climate, as Siberia's is not the most forgiving or lenient. Siberia does not get warmth from the Atlantic Ocean because of the barriers of Europe and the Ural Mountains, or from the warmer climes of Central Asia because of the mountains to its south and the mountains of the Russian Far East. Therefore, the only side of Siberia which is not blocked off by a geographical barrier is the north, opening up the area to the bitter cold of the Arctic Ocean. To add to these agricultural disadvantages, most of Siberia's soil is acidic podsol, which is not a good match for agriculture. However, there are rich, fertile black earth belts in the southwest (known as chernozem), as well as scattered pockets of rich land in other parts of southern Siberia. Despite the many drawbacks for cultivating Siberia lands, there exists a multitude of rivers and lakes that can be put to use for irrigation.

In terms of geographical location, there are two main agricultural centers in the fertile areas of Western Siberia, one being near the Urals in the Tobolsky District and the other located on the upper Ob River around the city of Tomsk. Despite the much more favorable conditions that prevail in these western parts, there do exist, however, pockets of suitable farming lands to the east. All of these combined areas were fertile enough, in fact, to necessitate the "Siberian tariff" of 1897, which was an increased rate on transport of butter and grain by rail to European Russia. This measure, which lasted until 1913, was enacted in order to protect European Russian farmers from the very cheap Siberian agricultural goods flooding in from the newly built Trans-Siberian Railway (which had decreased the price of shipping from Siberia by 5-6 times). Therefore, while the climate and geography posed difficulties for the Siberian farmer, there was still agricultural success to be had in the region.

== Pre-modern beginnings ==
The Neolithic period (8,000-7,000 BCE) is often taken to signify the start of land cultivation. However, the native peoples living in Siberia at that moment in history did not join in this global movement because of the difficulties associated with its severe climate. Agricultural stirrings did reach Siberia by the second half of the 3rd millennium, when the peoples of the Afanasevo culture of southern Siberia (located, more specifically, in the southern reaches of the Ob River), started to practice agronomy. It was a slow start, however, as these peoples had very rudimentary cultivation skills. They used digging sticks (the previously mentioned mattocks) as their main farming tool, and they were not able to subsist solely on this practice and turned as well toward hunting, gathering, and the domestication of sheep, cows, and horses.

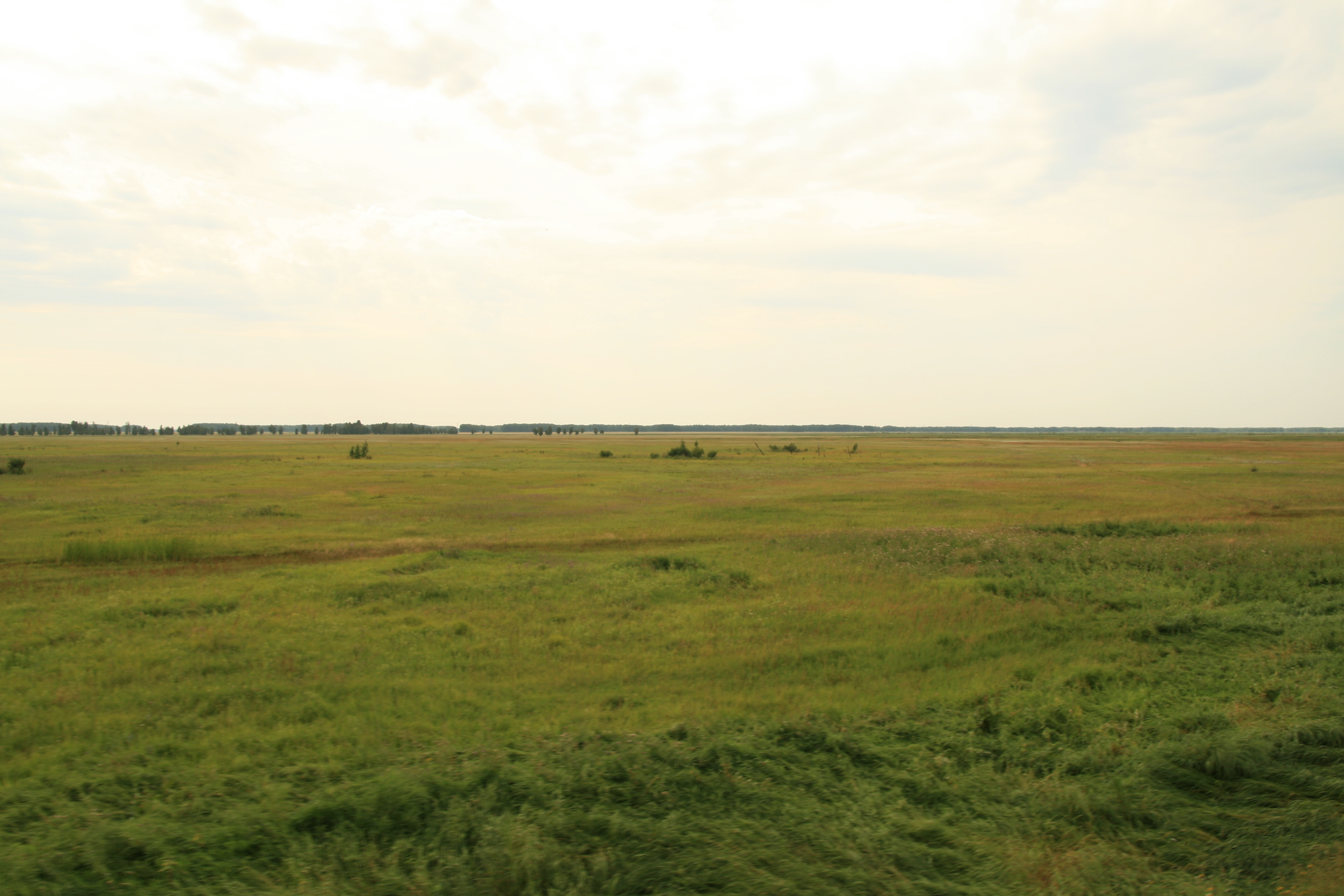
Siberian steppe in Tatarsky, Novosibirskaya Oblast

Only during the Bronze Age, with the advent of bronze scythes, were Siberians able to reach the same agricultural level as had already been achieved in many other areas of the world. This occurred with the rise of the Andronovo culture that inhabited the area between the Tobol River and the Minusinsk Basin. These peoples were sedentary wheat farmers who engaged in barter with the Chinese people to the southeast of their lands, along the periphery of what was to later become Siberia.

Siberian agriculture made even more headway during the Tagar culture of the 7th to 2nd centuries BCE, whose peoples lived in the Minusinsk Basin in the upper part of the Yenisei River and introduced the practice of irrigation to the region, signifying a major step forward in terms of increased output from agricultural pursuits.

The plough was finally adopted during the first independent Siberian state, the Kirghiz Khanate. This state arose during the 8th century AD, also along the Yenisei River, but adopted a larger range than the Tagar culture, stretching from Krasnoyarsk in the north to the Sayan Mountains in the south. While the economy of the peoples living in this area was based on nomadic cattle breeding, they also engaged in arable farming. The chief crops cultivated during this time included millet, barley, wheat, and hemp.

== Early Russian settlers in Siberia ==
The first step to opening up Siberia for Russian settlement and colonization came as early as 1558, when the wealthy landowner Grigory Dmitriyevich Stroganov received a charter from tsar Ivan the Terrible that gave him the right to colonize the "empty lands" beyond the Urals (that were already inhabited by the native tribes of Siberia). He was given the right to bring in settlers to these areas and plough their lands.

This colonization through land expropriation happened largely in gradual west-to-east steps, aided by the many rivers and river valleys that flow through Siberia. Russian settlers started in the westernmost valleys of the Tura, Tobol, Irtysh, and Ob rivers, and marched onwards to the Ket, Yenisei, Angara, Ilim, Lena, Shilka, Argun, and Amur rivers. Beginning in the 1620s, the area around Yeniseysk in Central Siberia was introduced to cultivation, as were the lands adjacent to Krasnoyarsk in the 1630s. The soil of the latter area was more attractive to settlers because of it was made of rich, black-earth (chernozem), much more conducive to farming than the other poor Siberian soil types. A few decades later, the Upper Lena and Upper Angara River Basins became the site for agriculture, mainly rye, oats, and barley. These areas were more remote and did not have the fertile earth that Krasnoyarsk laid claim to, but food production was crucially needed as more and more settlers started to flow into Siberia.

By the late 1600s, Russian settlers started making the long trek to Siberia in greater numbers in order to find new opportunities and lands to claim, away from the densely populated tracts of European Russia. In fact, some peasants chose to move away from their western homes because of poor soil conditions in their native regions, hoping to settle down on some of the chernozem soil that Siberia had to offer. Families also had the chance to improve their standing in society and escape poverty by taking advantage of the more lenient taxing system the Tsar offered in Siberia; for each acre of land that a family tilled for the tsar, they were given permission to plough five acres of government land for their own benefit. In addition to this, early settlers enjoyed a 10-year tax exemption, an incentive for families to migrate eastward.

These settlers brought many of their traditional Russian crops with them. The most important of these crops was rye, but they also brought other grains such as barley, wheat, buckwheat, and millet along with vegetables like peas, cabbage, turnips, carrots, onions, and garlic. Like the natives of the Kirghiz Khanate before them, all this Russian crop cultivation was done by plough.

The climate of Siberia is not conducive for agriculture, but Siberia during this time was in fact slowly becoming self-reliant. The Siberian Office was therefore gradually able to reduce the amount of food imported to Siberia from European Russia. This was great news for the Russian Imperial government, seeing as the price of shipping such staples as grain those enormous distances was both exorbitantly expensive and slow.

As the wave of Russian settlement crept ever eastward, agricultural success became less and less guaranteed. By the 1730s, this east-west journey had finally reached the Kamchatka Peninsula. The aim was to pursue agriculture just as previous settlers had done in the west, but the climate of this peninsula is extremely inhospitable and these pursuits were unsuccessful. However, there were scattered pockets which could produce grain in the eastern regions of Siberia, like Irkutsk, which grew to be one of the most influential cities east of the Urals. In contrast with other east Siberian cities, Irkutsk residents never experienced periods of hunger and did not have to rely on shipments of grain from the west to survive.

== Fur vs. agriculture ==
During this agricultural progression from east to west, settlers did not encounter the empty lands that Tsar Ivan the Terrible and Grigori Stroganov had been expecting. There were already Russian tracks on the land, marks of the indefatigable fur trade of the 1600s. Sable, Marten, and Fox pelts were harvested by the thousands, while squirrel pelt numbers reached even more tremendous numbers. Fur, in some ways, paved the way for Russia's modernization: furs (or "soft gold", as it was also called) were used as gifts for foreign ambassadors, paid for the expenses of the Tsar's court, and kept his government running smoothly. Furs helped finance the militarization of the Russian Empire, helping to win back lands from the Poles and the Swedes and funding the monstrous engine of expansion and modernization that was Peter the Great's main mission during his rule.

Because profits from the fur trade so fed the Russian machine during this time, it is perhaps no wonder that the Tsar wanted to preserve some lands for hunting purposes rather than for agricultural pursuits. In fact, in 1683, the Siberian Office sent to Yakutsk's governors a proclamation that stated there was to be: "a firm prohibition on pain of death that henceforth in sable hunting grounds no forest whatever [was] to be cut or burned, in order that the animals be not exterminated nor flee to distant parts".

As the animals were quickly hunted out of their traditional territory and the fur frontier was pushed evermore to the east, however, the fur trade dwindled and the scale tipped in favor of agriculture. The most resounding win for Siberian agriculture came in 1822, with the reforms of Mikhail Speransky. Whereas before, the native nomads of Siberia had been considered as such, they were now relegated to an artificial "settled" category and put on the same level as Russian settlers. This had two main implications for the region: Siberian natives were kept in conditions of destitution because of the increase in tax burden they were forced to face and large sections of land were freed up for cultivation.

With the influx of Russian peasants into areas that had traditionally been used as pastureland and hunting grounds, many natives decided to abandon their old ways of subsistence and fit themselves into the categories that the government had decreed for them. However, Russian settlers started the habit of seizing native lands if they were especially fertile or lay in advantageous locations. The method for claiming lands was as simple as taking them by force from the Siberian natives, which was a practice that came to be legalized by an official decree in 1879. This could take many forms, one of which being that Russian settlers sometimes simply ploughed up the land around a native family's yurt, forcing them to move. Through similar processes occurring all throughout Siberia, the fur business slowly transitioned to agriculture.

== Pre-1917 agricultural growth ==
During this Russian settlement, as peasants tried to establish themselves in the midst of harsh conditions and all the while battling the fur trade, the population and agricultural output were steadily rising. In the beginning of the 18th century, the entire population hovered around 500,000, while 150 years later, in the middle of the 19th century, it was nearing three million. Hand in hand with population growth came increased agricultural output. For example, in the period from 1850 to 1900, grain production went from 1.4 million tons to over 7 million tons. Indeed, this amounted to 16% of Russia's total grain production.

By 1910, when roughly 80 million acres of farmland were in use producing foodstuffs in Siberia, a million-ton annual surplus of wheat was established. In fact, compared with other areas of the country, around the turn of the century, Siberia's agriculture was quite technologically advanced. In 1911, when their European Russian equivalents were still threshing their grain by hand, Siberian Russians had an impressive collection of 37,000 mowing machines and 39,000 horse-drawn rakes. Siberians were using 25% of the agricultural machinery in the country, which was part of the reason that grain production exploded in this period.

Their animal helpers were also in better supply than in European Russia: Siberian Russians had twice as many oxen, three times as many horses, five times as many sheep, and nineteen times as many goats. The particular Siberian twist when it came to livestock, however, was the number of domesticated reindeer in the area, as many as 250,000 in the mid-19th century.

By 1917, the year of the Bolshevik Revolution, Siberian industry was still in a fledgling state: its total output amounted to a mere 3.5% of the Russian total. However, and perhaps surprising considering Siberia's stereotypes (but not surprising considering all of the information and data presented above), agriculture played a much more central role in the life of the region.

== Siberian butter industry ==
One facet of Siberian agriculture that may not be common knowledge is its thriving butter industry. By 1912, the Altai Region, which exists in the southernmost reaches of Siberia, close to the convergence of China, Mongolia, and Kazakhstan, was among the most densely populated areas of Siberia. By the time of the First World War, the majority of the tillable land of the area was in use. There was also significant cattle-breeding in this area, both by Russians and by natives. Taking advantage of these circumstances, a group of Danes had previously come to the region and introduced Siberia to the butter industry, though mainly starting their production plants in the cities of Tomsk and Tyumen. A butter romance, or as W. Bruce Lincoln described, a "butter fever", thus sprung up on the grasslands of what many may think is the world's coldest, most inhospitable terrain. A quote that serves to capture its importance comes from Pyotr Stolypin, the Russian Prime Minister himself: "The whole of our butter export to foreign markets is entirely based on the growth of Siberian butter production. Siberian butter-making brings us more than twice as much gold as the whole Siberian gold industry".

This Siberian industry was so extensive, in fact, that by 1917, half of all butter-producing plants in Russia were to be found in Siberia, and a staggering 90% of butter exportation came originally from this area. In 1907, butter production had reached an astonishing 63,000 tons, almost a tenfold increase over the amounts produced just thirteen years prior, in 1894. By 1914, Siberia had surpassed Australia and the Netherlands (major world suppliers of butter) in butter production and churning out just slightly less than Denmark, the country to which the Siberian butter trade owed its roots. Butter made more revenue than any other good apart from gold, wheat, and furs in that same year. Butter production carried such weight that, coupled with the Siberian grain industry, Lincoln credits it as playing one of the key roles in enticing foreign investment to enter the region around the turn of the century.

These plants were hit hard after this, however, with the internal strife of both the Bolshevik Revolution and the Russian Civil War, so much so that butter output dropped to a mere 6,000 tons in 1922, dipping below the 1894 levels. A revival came by 1927, however, when the 37,000-ton mark was reached and butter again became an important Russian export. However, the heydays of the Russian butter behemoth were over.

== Bolshevik Revolution ==
Siberian agriculture underwent a tremendous shift as a result of the Bolshevik Revolution. The Bolshevik coup d'etat began in 1917 when Vladimir Lenin and his followers deposed Alexander Kerensky's Russian Provisional Government and established a Communist regime.

In the time leading to the Bolshevik Revolution, there was a substantial amount of distress amongst Soviet peasants—so much so that many analysts "have focused upon the Russian rural economy for the light that such an investigation might shed upon political and economic forces leading to the Revolution of 1917." It is a bit ambitious to assume that the Revolution of 1917 completely sparked out of agrarian peasant problems, but it is not too outlandish to propose that it most likely was one a few key contributing factors the Bolshevik Revolution.

The Agrarian Crisis of 1905 most certainly contributed to the future revolution of 1917. The 1905 crisis was unquestionably related to peasant agrarian problems in three ways. The first was that there was a decline in the amount of agricultural production in comparison with the amount that had been generally accepted and produced in the past. The second was that peasant living standards began to diminish mostly due to a reduction in grain for consumption either because taxes increased, there was lessened production or because of "the government's policy of forcing grain exports." The third reason encompassed the conventional concerns one would have in regards to an economy that's mostly dependent on agriculture such as lack of fertility, exploitation of the land and the implementation of unhelpful government policies.

Specific indications that led to up the Agrarian Crisis were "rising land prices, growing arrears in peasant redemption payments, the famine of the early 1890s, declining per capita land holdings of the peasants and the reports of peasant impoverishment in grain deficit provinces." From the previously reported symptoms leading up to the Crisis, it is logical to deduce that the Agrarian Crisis of 1905 was directly related to peasant unrest in relation to land unrest.

== Dekulakization and collectivization ==
Between the years of 1929 to 1932, the Soviet Communist Party under Joseph Stalin organized dekulakization and collectivization. Dekulakization involved the killing and deportation of millions of peasants and their families. Collectivization signified the "effective abolition of private property in land, and the concentration of the remaining peasantry in 'collective' farming under Party control."

Although collectivization is discussed in relation to agriculture, it is quite evident that the Communist Party's Policy was directed not only at collectivizing land, but also at collectivizing people. The thought process and reasoning behind collectivizing agriculture was that having a few larger "mechanized grain or livestock farms" seemed as though it would be much more functional than having several independent farms. In contrast, in regards to people, "the principal aim of collectivization was 'to concentrate the native population as much as possible'" and to scrap nomadism.

== Virgin Lands Campaign ==
By the 1950s, increases in the standard of living prompted a move by the state to increase the quantity and quality of foodstuffs for the general population. To meet this goal, the Virgin Lands Campaign was established under Nikita Khrushchev, which set aside ten million hectares of grassland for cultivation, mainly in western Siberia and on the Kazakh Steppe, and enlisted the help of over 640,000 young volunteers in the first three years alone. Many of these were recruited with help from the Young Communist League and showered with praise for going out into the countryside to help further the cause of Communism. Khrushchev had lofty goals, speaking of overtaking America's food production with the help of this initiative. Indeed, one of his goals was to turn this area into a Russian version of Iowa's vast cornfields. Though this program markedly increased food production, soil erosion became widespread by the middle of the 60's along with dissatisfaction to eating non-traditional corn and corn-based products.

== Agricultural revival 1970–1989 ==
Prior to the decades of the nineteen seventies and eighties, developing and expanding the agricultural infrastructure of the Russian countryside was given a lower priority vis-a-vis industry. Schools, hospitals, roads and other structures serving the community remained underdeveloped compared with the amount of effort and funding invested in keeping urban centers up to speed with the western world. Even though rural conditions vastly improved, the amount of attention paid to improving urban centers was undeniably in much higher favor. However, despite the existence of a so-called "urban-rural" gap, rural areas (also referred to as peri-urban areas) were able to thrive over "spillover effects" from well-developed metropolitan areas nearby. People living in these peri-urban areas took advantage of the infrastructural developments from these cities by taking the opportunity to develop reliable transportation to and from the city thus creating a link between urban and rural areas in Russia. As a result, this linkage between the city and the countryside led to a relationship in which both sides benefited and agriculture subsequently expanded.

The rural demographic shift to urban areas that plagued most rural counties did not tremendously affect peri-urban areas in Russia. In fact, these areas seemed to experience population increase and at minimum a stabilization in population size. The agricultural and labor supply mirrored the activity of population growth in that it experienced stabilization or a rise in productivity. The proliferation observed in peri-urban communities during this time was not a universal trend. During the nineteen seventies and eighties, the west, conversely was thrown into disorder by the "disruptive influence of urbanization on agriculture."

During the mid-1980s, agricultural output suffered a lag in productivity that directly correlated with distance from an urban center. The so-called "rural periphery" or the land that was located outside a two-hour radius from an urban center was being cultivated inefficiently and ineffectively. The way in which the land was cultivated was done so unwisely—too much of the land was farmed at one time in contrast to using a structure like that of crop rotation, which uses modern irrigation techniques and a variance of crops. In other words, what was going on can be simplified as "the greater the amount of land under cultivation, the lower the productivity", which led ultimately led to a lack in fertility.

Landowners began to abandon their land and failed to report the actual size of their property to the Central Statistical Directorate. As a result, the Soviet Regime was quite unaware of the magnitude of this problem and failed to address it properly. During the nineteen eighties, aerial photographs were taken that displayed that the amount of land reported to authorities was only half of what was actually being cultivated. Statistics show that "agricultural land contracted to 20 to 46 percent between 1959 and 1989", the biggest reduction occurring in the Northern European region of Russia; however, it is estimated that the actual percentage of agricultural land that was abandoned was nearly twice the size than what was recorded. This lack of honesty and communication instigated distrust and an inability of the Soviet Regime to be helpful in solving this agricultural crisis.

Soil fertility and the plausibility of easily accessing a metropolitan center were deemed the two most important factors that contributed to the success of an agricultural community. In order to measure the success of certain conditions on land used for agricultural production in Russia, a particular method was used. It involved analyzing specific "regionally representative parcels of land in the absence of irrigation and any other sophisticated cultivation method" and taking into consideration aspects such as "soil type, temperature and moisture". According to these "so-called bioclimatic potential yields", it was determined that in Siberia, the "far-eastern Primorsky krai and Amur oblast" were most prosperous in terms of agricultural potential.

In the 1990s, with the onset of market reforms, agricultural output collapsed, and rural agricultural areas continued to decline in productivity, though they were not alone in this lack of output as urban centers began to suffer in terms of manufacturing, but at an even higher rate. This was not only alarming because never had such a statistic revealed itself, but also because the agricultural realm was so dependent on the consistency of the urban realm for its own survival that such a decline would prove harmful to both spheres. The dramatic crop failure of 1998 that Siberia experienced did not help the situation either. Subsidiary farming, a form of farming executed by small-town inhabitants in their private yards, began to rise during this period further proving a regression in rural production. The institution of subsidiary farming represented a serious step back in terms of modern development.

A severe cut in the number of cattle head was also a major signifier of the agricultural difficulties occurring at the time. Although it was acknowledged that it was more economical to import meat to Russia as opposed to raising and feeding cattle as it had normally done in previous decades, the massive number of cattle head that had vanished was too significant to ignore.

== A solution to the late 20th century agricultural crisis ==
A solution to the succession of problems that had snowballed for decades was threefold: "contraction of agricultural space, demographic revival and vertical integration of food producers". Russian farmland was of great value to the country, but on the other hand it was excessively burdensome. Only a small percentage of farms were actually profitable to the country—making the rest of them an abandoned and cumbersome load. "Because communal farming in outlying areas could not be disbanded" due to the underlying purpose of its establishment to act as a "vehicle for collective survival", many failing farms could not be abandoned according to government regulations. The persistence to keep afloat unprofitable farms was perhaps one of the greater disadvantages to the development of the Russian economy. This movement dragged down on the economy and likewise prevented successful farms from having the opportunity to "reinvest their profits, because of the redistribution of these profits to the benefit of unprofitable farms". Demographic revival introduced itself as a key player in the road to restoring Russia's agricultural sphere. Although the Russian countryside will never be as populated as it once was, great efforts are being made to bring its population size back to where it was. In 1992, rural communities enjoyed a two-year movement in which more people moved from metropolitan areas to the countryside than vice versa. The value of population increase in rural areas is directly related to maintenance of farmland—the more people that live in the countryside, literally the more hands there are to work the land and maintain the abundance of farmland. Thus, an increase in rural population would consequently lead to an improvement in Siberian agriculture. Two components that are considered when discussing population are "migration and natural increase;" the first is more important initially because able adults are necessary to motivate a developing community. However, the second term becomes equally important with time when the people who moved to the countryside begin to reproduce and settle permanently in rural districts.

Alexsandr Chaianov is credited for hypothesizing the theory of "agricultural cooperation in which he distinguished between vertical and horizontal forms of cooperative arrangements". The horizontal cooperation was described as a much more dysfunctional model in which small farms were identified as units that formed links with each other. The vertical cooperation was described as a much more practical model in that it involved linking "farms with food processors and retailers" in a hierarchical and feasible trend.
