= Anastasia Popova (journalist) =

Russian journalist (born 1987)

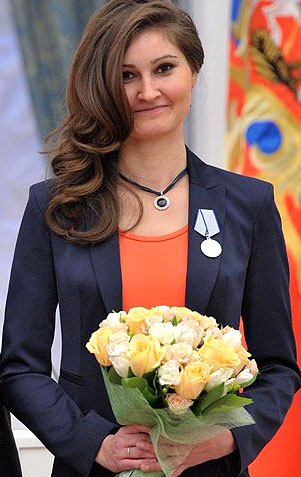

Anastasiya Andreevna Popova (Russian: Анастасия Андреевна Попова; November 24, 1987, Moscow) is a Russian journalist who works for Russia-24. She directed a documentary The Syrian Diary about the war in Syria.

She was one of the eight flag bearers of the Olympic flag at the opening ceremony of the 2014 Winter Olympics.
