= Anastasia Popova (footballer) =

Belarusian footballer

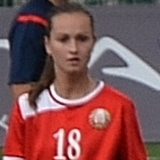

Personal information
- Date of birth: 4 October 1990 (age 36)
- Place of birth: Minsk, Soviet Union (now Belarus)
- Height: 1.68 m (5 ft 6 in)
- Position: Midfielder

Team information
- Current team: Dinamo Minsk
- Number: 21

Senior career*
Years	Team	Apps	(Gls)
2010–2017	Zorka-BDU	152	(94)
2018	Isloch-RGUOR	20	(4)
2019	Minsk	18	(7)
2020–	Dinamo Minsk	24	(3)

International career^{‡}
2020–	Belarus	9	(0)
- * Club domestic league appearances and goals as of 2 July 2021. ‡ National team caps and goals as of 27 November 2020.

Anastasia Popova (Belarusian: Анастасия Попова; born 4 October 1990) is a Belarusian footballer who plays as a midfielder for Premier League club FC Dinamo Minsk and the Belarus women's national team.

== Club career ==
Popova has played for Zorka-BDU, Isloch-RGUOR, FC Minsk and Dinamo Minsk in Belarus.

== International career ==
Popova capped for Belarus at senior level during two FIFA Women's World Cup qualifications (2011 and 2015) and two UEFA Women's Euro qualifications (2013 and 2017).
