= Salim Ismail =

Indo-Canadian serial entrepreneur, angel investor and author

- Born: May 17, 1965 (age 61); Hyderabad, India
- Education: University of Waterloo
- Occupations: Global Ambassador for Singularity University, co-founder of Confabb, PubSub Concepts and Angstro
- Years active: 1989–present
- Website: Salimismail.com

Salim Ismail (born May 17, 1965 in Hyderabad, India) is an Indo-Canadian serial entrepreneur, angel investor, author, speaker, and technology strategist. He is the Founding Executive Director of Singularity University and lead author of Exponential Organizations. In March 2017 he was named to the board of the XPRIZE Foundation.

He is a serial entrepreneur having co-founded a number of tech companies (Confabb, PubSub Concepts and Ångströ, acquired by Google in 2010) and led Brickhouse, Yahoo!'s internal incubator for new products.

He is the lead author of international bestseller Exponential Organizations, and the founder of ExO Works and OpenExO, where he serves as Chairman. He is the Chairman of Genius Group.

== Early life ==
Ismail was born in Hyderabad, India, and moved to Toronto at age 10.

== Career ==
After graduating from university, Ismail worked as a software architect for CSC Europe and later as a business consultant at ITIM Associates in London. In 1999, he became the COO of New York Business Forums in New York City.

=== Startup ventures ===
In 2001, Ismail founded the New York Grant Company [NYGC] in direct response to 9/11, where he served as its Chairman/CEO until 2005. In its first year, NYGC attracted over 400 clients and delivered over $12 million of federal grants to the local economy.

In 2002, Ismail co-founded PubSub Concepts, which laid some of the foundation for the real-time web. The company had an ugly ending that was discussed at various PR crisis management conferences.

In 2006, he co-founded Confabb.com with four others to create a centralized place to get information about conferences. The company received $200k in angel funding from early investors including Dave Winer.

=== Yahoo ===
In early 2007, Yahoo appointed Ismail as Vice President and Head of Brickhouse, Yahoo's internal incubator. The objective of Brickhouse was to form teams to work on disruptive ideas. During his tenure with Yahoo!, Ismail worked on several products and launched new products for them including WildFire, Yahoo Pipes and Fire Eagle as well as created a relationship between Yahoo! and NASA to explore various collaborative projects.

=== Ångströ ===
Ismail was one of the executives that left Yahoo! in the wake of the failed Microsoft bid in 2008 and with his friend, Rohit Khare he cofounded Ångströ, a company that used social networks to find news about their clients, colleagues and friends. The service notified users in real time and attracted the attention of Google, which ended up acquiring it in 2010.

=== Singularity University ===
By November 2009, Ismail was serving as executive director of Singularity University on NASA's Ames campus. By 2013, Wired described him as the university's global ambassador and reported that about 45 start-ups had spun out of its summer Graduate Studies Program. For two years, Ismail worked with Peter Diamandis and Ray Kurzweil, along with key partners NASA, Google, Cisco, Autodesk and Genentech to build out the university, assembling its core team and faculty, establishing the curriculum and leading the first programs. In late 2010, Ismail took on the role of Singularity University's Global Ambassador.

=== ExO Works ===
Ismail founded ExO Works in 2016. The ExO Movement now includes a platform and consulting teams, educational programs, books and tools to build organizations.

=== OpenExO ===
Ismail founded ExO Works in 2016. OpenExO merged with Genius Group in 2024.

=== Rokk3r Fuel ExO ===
Rokk3r Fuel was launched as a venture capital firm in March 2017. In September 2017, Bloomberg reported that Ismail was joining Miami-based venture-capital firm Rokk3r Fuel as a general partner. By 2018, PR Newswire described Rokk3r Fuel ExO as a $150 million global venture-capital fund.

== Public speaking ==
Ismail speaks at conferences and industry events on the topics of disruptive convergence, exponential organizations, future of entrepreneurship, future of democracy and future of education, such as TED conferences, the Noco Foundation and Ciudad de las Ideas in 2012.

In 2012, he participated in the debate at the Oxford Union as part of Saïd Business School's Silicon Valley Comes to Oxford 12 programme.

As of 2012 he holds the position of Global Ambassador for Singularity University, representing it at various conferences and industry events.

== Book ==
In 2011, Ismail started writing Exponential Organizations with co-authors Mike Malone and Yuri van Geest. The book was published by Diversion Books in October 2014 and was named Frost & Sullivan's 2014 "Growth, Innovation, and Leadership Book of the Year".

The book aims to provide readings with information on “why new organizations are ten times better, faster and cheaper than yours (and what to do about it)” and comes down to a simple philosophy: in business, performance is key and when it comes to performance how you organize your efforts is the key to growth.

== Philanthropy ==
In response to the 9/11 attacks, Ismail founded the New York Grant Company, which in its first year attracted over 400 clients and delivered over $12 million of federal grants to the local economy.
