= Green School (Bali) =

Green School Bali

Location
- Interactive map
- Jl. Raya Sibang Kaja, Banjar Saren, Sibang Kaja, Abiansemal; Badung Regency, Bali; Indonesia; 8.5667787°S 115.21367130000002°E

Information
- School type: Private International/Holistic Sustainability Education
- Founded: 2008
- Status: Open
- Enrolment: 490
- Website: http://www.greenschool.org/

Green School Bali is a private and international pre-kindergarten to high school located along the Ayung River near Abiansemal, Badung Regency, Bali, Indonesia.

John and Cynthia Hardy founded the school. The Hardys reportedly conceived of the Green School in 2006 after reading Alan Wagstaff's concept document for a Three Springs educational village community. The school's bamboo bridge, spanning 22 meters across the Ayung River, was completed in November 2006. Green School opened in September 2008 with 90 students and a tailor-made campus that emerged from the jungle and rice fields. Since then it has grown to approximately 400 students.

== Ecological design ==
Despite early intentions to live off the grid, as of 2021, the school's 70+ buildings are not off the grid, but use some renewable energy sources, including micro-hydro power from a "hydroelectric vortex", and solar power.

The campus is designed around the principles of an organic permaculture system, and the students cultivate an organic garden as part of their learning activities. Buildings are constructed primarily from renewable resources including bamboo, local grass and traditional mud walls. The campus has been reported as an example of the large-scale building potential of bamboo architecture, especially "The Heart of the School" – a 60-meter long, stilt-structure constructed with 2500 bamboo poles. The school also utilizes renewable building materials for some of its other needs, although senior students are required to use laptops.

In January 2015, Green School high school students launched the Bio Bus, a student-led social enterprise to provide sustainable transport services to Green School students, teachers and community. This initiative looked at solving the transportation system to the rural setting of Green School, which mainly consisted of private cars, carpooling and motorbikes. The Bio Bus now has four 18-seater buses that run purely on biodiesel (B100) made from used cooking oil.

== Curriculum ==
The school consists of four learning neighborhoods – Early Years, Primary School, Middle School & High School. Special programmes include Green Studies, environmental science, entrepreneurial learning, and the creative arts.

Green School educates through a holistic, community-integrated, entrepreneurial learning programme. The school is accredited by the Western Association of Schools & Colleges (WASC).

== Extracurricular activities ==
=== Kul Kul Connection ===
Founded in 2016, the Kul Kul Connection is a community program, hosted after school for more than 210 local students. The main focus of the program is the English language and sustainability.

== Board of directors & Governance ==
In 2015, Green School launched a Strategic Review process to include members of the faculty, parents, local community and board of directors in the spirit of the progressiveness of the school. To meet this evolution, the governance structure of Green School was updated and made public. Its three-level governance structure is based on the Indonesian legal requirements. There are currently Trustees, a Board of Management – a cross-stakeholder body that governs the School operationally to provide the school's holistic education experience, and implement its strategic plan. School Board Members have included Roger J. Hamilton David Heffernan. Ronald Stones, Nadya Hutagalung, Mickey Ackerman, Chris Saye, Derek Montgomery and Theo Bakker.

== Awards ==
Green School was awarded the 2012 "Greenest School on Earth" award by the Center for Green Schools at the U.S. Green Building Council. The school was a finalist for the 2010 Aga Khan Award for Architecture.
