= Global Volunteer Network =

The Global Volunteer Network (GVN) is a Charitable Trust based in Wellington, New Zealand and offers volunteer opportunities in community projects throughout the world. GVN's vision is to support the work of local community organizations in developing countries through the placement of international volunteers. They believe that local communities are in the best position to determine their needs, and they provide volunteers to help them achieve their goals. The GVN-Foundation is the non-profit fundraising arm that provides financial assistance to these communities.

== History ==
GVN was launched in December 2000 by Colin Salisbury, its Founder and President, after spending time volunteering in Ghana, West Africa. While Salisbury was there he saw the tremendous difference volunteers could make in helping local organisations achieve their goals.

Salisbury has extensive volunteer experience both locally and internationally with time spent in Ecuador, Ghana, Nepal, Papua New Guinea, Philippines, and Thailand. His background is in Community Development and holds a master's degree in International Development.

In 2007 Bill Gates (Microsoft's co-founder and leading philanthropist) recommended Global Volunteer Network as a first port of call for young people who want to make a difference in the world during an interview with America's ’Newsweek’ Gates said “Two places to get started are Network for Good and Global Volunteer Network.”

== Programs ==
GVN currently offers volunteer placements through their partner organisations in 21 countries: Cambodia, Costa Rica, Ecuador, Ethiopia, Ghana, Guatemala, Kenya, Nepal, New Zealand, Panama, Peru, Philippines, Rwanda, South Africa, Thailand, Uganda, USA, and Vietnam.

GVN also partners with UniversalGiving, an online nonprofit organization to offer their volunteer placements in countries listed above.

GVN also offer fundraising treks that give participants the opportunity to explore some of the world's highest peaks while providing orphan children with shelter, food, clothing, education, and medical care. GVN currently have treks planned to Mt. Everest Base Camp, Machu Picchu and Mt. Kilimanjaro.

GVN also offer a program for social entrepreneurs called Be the Change. The week-long program, led by Colin Salisbury, takes participants through a series of workshops that focus on identifying and developing skills.

== Volunteers ==
In 2002 GVN placed 240 volunteers, and in 2008 they placed almost 2000 volunteers. Altogether they have placed over 20,000 volunteers.

== GVN Foundation ==
Colin Salisbury co-founded the GVN Foundation in 2005 with Courtney Montague after witnessing the impact that resources combined with volunteering could make in a community. The vision of the GVN Foundation is to support the charitable and educational work of local community organizations in various countries through the distribution of financial, in-kind and material donations.

The GVN Foundation is a 501(c)(3) tax-exempt nonprofit organization in the United States. In July 2009 the United Nations Economic and Social Council (ECOSOC) granted special consultative status to the GVN Foundation.
