= Anastasiia =

Anastasiia is a given name. Notable people with the name include:

- Anastasiia Akchurina (born 1992), Russian badminton player
- Anastasiia Antoniak (born 1997), Ukrainian swimmer
- Anastasiia Arkhipova (born 2003), Ukrainian figure skater
- Anastasiia Bachynska (born 2003), Ukrainian artistic gymnast
- Anastasiia Blyshchyk, Ukrainian journalist and soldier
- Anastasiia Bryzgina (born 1998), Ukrainian sprinter
- Anastasiia Demurchian (born 2004), Italian boxer
- Anastasiia Dolgova (born 2000), Russian canoeist
- Anastasiia Yeva Domani, Ukrainian activist
- Anastasiia Filina (born 2002), Kyrgyzstani swimmer
- Anastasiia Galashina (born 1997), Russian sport shooter
- Anastasiia Gavrylchenko (born 1989), Ukrainian athlete
- Anastasiia Goncharova, Russian Paralympic swimmer
- Anastasiia Gontar (born 2001), Russian Paralympic swimmer
- Anastasiia Gorbunova (born 1995), Ukrainian alpine skier
- Anastasiia Goreeva (born 1999), Russian biathlete
- Anastasiia Gubanova (born 2002), Russian-Georgian figure skater
- Anastasiia Guliakova (born 2002), Russian figure skater
- Anastasiia Gureva (born 2005), Russian tennis player
- Anastasiia Harnyk (born 1995), Ukrainian Paralympic judoka
- Anastasiia Hotfrid (born 1996), Ukrainian-born Georgian weightlifter
- Anastasiia Iakovenko (born 1995), Russian racing cyclist
- Anastasiia Ikan (born 2007), Ukrainian rhythmic gymnast
- Anastasiia Ivanova (born 1990), Russian foil fencer
- Anastasiia Oleksiivna Kamenskykh, known professionally as NK (singer) (born 1987), Ukrainian singer
- Anastasiia Komovych (born 1994), Ukrainian sambo practitioner
- Anastasiia Kosu (born 2005), Russian basketball player
- Anastasiia Krapivina (born 1994), Russian swimmer
- Anastasiia Kurashvili (born 2003), Ukrainian aerobic gymnast
- Anastasiia Lenna, Ukrainian model
- Anastasiia Liashenko (born 1986), Ukrainian politician
- Anastasiia Lysenko (born 1995), Ukrainian weightlifter
- Anastasiia Makina (born 1997), Russian handballer
- Anastasiia Manievska (born 1998), Ukrainian weightlifter
- Anastasiia Masiutkina (born 1985), Ukrainian blogger and model
- Anastasiia Matrosova (born 1982), Ukrainian judoka
- Anastasiia Metelkina (born 2005), Russian-Georgian pair skater
- Anastasiia Moskalenko (born 2000), Ukrainian Paralympic athlete
- Anastasiia Motak (born 2004), Ukrainian artistic gymnast
- Anastasiia Mulmina (born 1997), Ukrainian group rhythmic gymnast
- Anastasiia Mysnyk (born 1991), Ukrainian Paralympic athlete
- Anastasiia Nedobiha (born 1994), Ukrainian diver
- Anastasiia Nikolenko (born 2011), Ukrainian rhythmic gymnast
- Anastasiia Novikova (born 1997), Ukrainian sambo practitioner
- Anastasiia Osniach (born 1996), Ukrainian wrestler
- Anastasiia Pervushina (born 1997), Russian freestyle skier
- Anastasiia Pidpalova (born 1982), Ukrainian handball player
- Anastasiia Pliaskina (born 1996), Russian cyclist
- Anastasiia Riabtseva (born 1996), Russian handball player
- Anastasiia Rybachok (born 1998), Ukrainian sprint canoeist
- Anastasiia Salos (born 2002), Belarusian rhythmic gymnast
- Anastasiia Semenova (born 1999), Russian badminton player
- Anastasiia Semenovych (born 2007), Ukrainian acrobatic gymnast
- Anastasiia Shabotova (born 2006), Russian-Ukrainian figure skater
- Anastasiia Shevchenko (born 1998), Russian para swimmer
- Anastasiia Shmonina (born 2005), Ukrainian synchronized swimmer
- Anastasiia Silanteva (born 1998), Russian alpine skier
- Anastasiia Smirnova (disambiguation), multiple people
- Anastasiia Sobolieva (born 2004), Ukrainian tennis player
- Anastasiia Soloveva (born 1997), Russian Paralympic athlete
- Anastasiia Todorova (born 1993), Ukrainian canoeist
- Anastasiia Tsybuliak (born 1984), Ukrainian scientist

== See also ==
- Anastas
- Anastasi (disambiguation)
- Anastacia (given name)
- Anastasia
- Anastasija
- Anastasiya
- Anastassia
- Annastasia
- Antasia, a genus of moths in the family Geometridae
