= Anastasiya =

Anastasiya is a feminine given name. Notable people with that name include the following:

== Sports ==
=== Athletics ===
- Anastasiya Ilyina (born 1982), Russian triple jumper and long jumper
- Anastasiya Juravleva (born 1981), Uzbekistani triple jumper and long jumper
- Anastasiya Kapachinskaya (born 1979), Russian sprinter
- Anastasiya Mokhnyuk (born 1991), Ukrainian heptathlon athlete
- Anastasiya Ott (born 1988), Russian hurdling athlete
- Anastasiya Rabchenyuk (born 1983), Ukrainian hurdling athlete
- Anastasiya Shvedova (born 1979), Belarusian pole vaulter
- Anastasiya Soprunova (born 1986), Kazakhstani hurdler
- Anastasiya Svechnikova (born 1992), Uzbekistani javelin thrower
- Anastasiya Taranova-Potapova (born 1985), Russian triple jumper
- Anastasiya Tkachuk (born 1993), Ukrainian middle-distance runner
- Anastasiya Zubova (born 1979), Russian long-distance runner

=== Aquatics ===
- Anastasiya Chepak (born 1985), Ukrainian synchronized swimmer
- Anastasiya Dmytriv (born 2008), Spanish Paralympic swimmer
- Anastasiya Kirpichnikova (born 2000), Russian swimmer
- Anastasiya Korolyova (born 1983), Uzbekistani swimmer
- Anastasiya Krapyvina (born 1994), Russian swimmer
- Anastasiya Kuliashova (born 2001), Belarusian swimmer
- Anastasiya Malyavina (born 1997), Ukrainian swimmer
- Anastasiya Morozova (born 2000), Uzbekistani synchronized swimmer
- Anastasiya Savchuk (born 1996), Ukrainian synchronised swimmer
- Anastasiya Shkurdai (born 2003), Belarusian swimmer
- Anastasiya Tyurina (born 2001), Tajikistani swimmer
- Anastasiya Yermakova (born 1983), Russian synchronised swimmer
- Anastasiya Zudzilava (born 2001), Belarusian para swimmer

=== Cross sports ===
- Anastasiya Chernenko (born 1990), Ukrainian triathlete
- Anastasiya Mokhnyuk (born 1991), Ukrainian pentathlete
- Anastasiya Polyanskaya (born 1986), Ukrainian triathlete
- Anastasiya Prokopenko (born 1985), Belarusian modern pentathlete
- Anastasiya Spas (born 1993), Ukrainian modern pentathlete
- Anastasiya Taranova-Potapova (born 1985), Russian triple jumper

=== Handball ===
- Anastasiya Kulak (born 1995), Belarusian handball player
- Anastasiya Mazgo (born 1995), Belarusian handballer
- Anastasiya Pidpalova (born 1982), Ukrainian handballer

=== Football ===
- Anastasiya Akimova (born 1991), Russian football defender
- Anastasiya Berezina (1997–2019), russian footballer
- Anastasiya Kharlanova (born 1992), Belarusian football forward
- Anastasiya Kunitskaya (born 1989), Belarusian football defender
- Anastasiya Novikova (born 1998), Belarusian footballer
- Anastasiya Pobegaylo (born 2004), Belarusian footballer
- Anastasiya Shlapakova (born 2000), Belarusian footballer

=== Gymnastics ===
- Anastasiya Alistratava (born 2003), Belarusian artistic gymnast
- Anastasiya Kisse (born 1995), Ukrainian rhythmic gymnast
- Anastasiya Kolesnikova (born 1984), Russian artistic gymnast
- Anastasiya Malakanava (born 2003), Belarusian rhythmic gymnast
- Anastasiya Miroshnichenko (born 2004), Uzbekistani artistic gymnast
- Anastasiya Muntyanu (born 1994), Canadian rhythmic gymnast
- Anastasiya Prasolova (born 1989), Azerbaijani rhythmic gymnast
- Anastasiya Rybakova (born 2000), Belarusian rhythmic gymnast
- Anastasiya Sarantseva (born 2008), Uzbekistani rhythmic gymnast
- Anastasiya Serdyukova (born 1997), Uzbekistani rhythmic gymnast
- Anastasiya Voznyak (born 1998), Ukrainian rhythmic gymnast

=== Nordic sports ===
- Anastasiya Barannikova (born 1987), Russian ski jumper
- Anastasiya Kuzmina (born 1984), Slovak biathlete
- Anastasiya Merkushyna (born 1995), Ukrainian biathlete
- Anastasiya Novosad (born 1993), Ukrainian freestyle skier
- Anastasiya Nychyporenko (born 1995), Moldovan biathlete
- Anastasiya Shepilenko (born 2000), Ukrainian alpine skier
- Anastasiya Skryabina (born 1985), Ukrainian alpine skier

=== Racquet sports ===
- Anastasiya Cherniavskaya (born 1992), Belarusian badminton player
- Anastasiya Dmytryshyn (born 1995), Ukrainian badminton player
- Anastasiya Komardina (born 1997), Russian tennis player
- Anastasiya Prenko (born 1993), Turkmenistan tennis player
- Anastasiya Shoshyna (born 1997), Ukrainian tennis player
- Anastasiya Vasylyeva (born 1992), Ukrainian tennis player
- Anastasiya Yakimova (born 1986), Belarusian tennis player

=== Water sports ===
- Anastasiya Boroda (born 1976), Kazakhstani water polo player
- Anastasiya Horlova (born 1995), Ukrainian canoeist
- Anastasiya Kozhenkova (born 1986), Ukrainian rower

=== Weightlifting ===
- Anastasiya Lysenko (born 1995), Ukrainian weightlifter
- Anastasiya Mikhalenka (born 1995), Belarusian weightlifter

=== Volleyball ===
- Anastasiya Gurbanova (born 1989), Azerbaijani volleyball player
- Anastasiya Harelik (born 1991), Belarusian volleyball player
- Anastasiya Kodirova (born 1979), Russian volleyball player

=== Other ===
- Anastasiya Dmitrieva (born 1987), Russian judoka
- Anastasiya Dzedzikava (born 1997), Belarusian cyclist
- Anastasiya Galustyan (born 1999), Russian-Armenian figure skater
- Anastasiya Huchok (born 1992), Belarusian wrestler
- Anastasiya Kolesava (born 2000), Belarusian cyclist
- Anastasiya Nifontova (born 1979), Russian rally raid motorcycle racer
- Anastasiya Ovsyannikova (born 1988), Russian Paralympian
- Anastasiya Rarovskaya, Belarusian racewalker
- Anastasiya Turchyn (born 1995), Ukrainian judoka
- Anastasiya Verameyenka (born 1987), Belarusian basketball player
- Anastasiya Zimiankova, Belarusian freestyle wrestler

== Chess ==
- Anastasiya Karlovich (born 1982), Ukrainian chess player
- Anastasiya Rakhmangulova (born 1994), Ukrainian chess player
- Anastasya Paramzina (born 1998), Russian chess player

== Music ==
- Anastasiya Bespalova, Russian composer
- Anastasiya Oleksiyivna Kamenskykh (born 1987), known as NK (Ukrainian singer)
- Anastasiya Petryk (born 2002), Ukrainian singer
- Anastasiya Petryshak (born 1994), Ukrainian violinist
- Anastasiya Usova (born 1988), Kazakhstani singer

== Royalty ==
- Anastasiya Dabizha (died 1703), Romanian princess
- Anastasija Trubetskaya (1700–1755), Russian/Romanian princess

== Theatrics ==
- Anastasiya Makeyeva (born 1981), Russian actress and model
- Anastasiya Nemolyaeva (born 1969), Russian actress
- Anastasiya Verbitskaya (1861–1928), Russian writer
- Anastasiya Vertinskaya (born 1944), Russian actress

== Other ==
- Anastasiya Biseniek (1899–1943), Russian resistance member
- Anastasiya Chernova (born 1981), Russian sailor
- Anastasiya Kobzarenko (1934–2022), Ukrainian librarian and writer
- Anastasiya Krasovskaya (born 1999), Belarusian model and actress
- Anastasiya Markovich (born 1979), Ukrainian painter
- Anastasiya Meshcheryakova (died 2016), Russian homicide victim
- Anastasiya Novikova (1980–2004), Kazakhstani journalist
- Anastasiya Podobed (born 1973), Belarusian sailor
- Anastasiya Radina (born 1984), Ukrainian politician
- Anastasiya Sienina (born 1991), Ukrainian beauty pageant titleholder

== See also ==
- Anastacia (given name)
- Anastasia
- Anastasiia
- Anastasija
- Annastasia
- Anastassya Kudinova
