= Anastacia (given name) =

Anastacia or Annastacia is a feminine given name. Notable people with this name include:

== People ==
- Escrava Anastacia (Portuguese for 'Anastacia the Slave', born 1740), Brazilian folk saint
- Anastacia Giron-Tupas, nurse and first Philippine female hospital superintendent
- Annastacia Ndhlovu, Zimbabwean politician
- Anastacia Lyn Newkirk (born 1968), American entertainer
- Annastacia Palaszczuk (born 1969), Australian politician and 39th Premier of Queensland
- Aastacia Pasahol, namesake of the Anastacia Pasahol Ancestral Home; see List of Cultural Properties of the Philippines in Sariaya, Quezon
- Anastácia Sibo (born 1982), Angolan handball player

== Characters ==
- Aunt Anastacia, a fictional character from the 1954 U.S. film The Long, Long Trailer
- Anastácia, a fictional character from the 1967 Brazilian telenovela Anastácia, a Mulher sem Destino
- Anastacia, a fictional character from the 2014 U.S. film School Dance (film)
- Anastacia of Astora is a character from the video game Dark Souls (video game)

== See also ==
- Anastacia (disambiguation)
- Anastacio (name)
- Anastazia Wambura
- Annastacia Palaszczuk
- Anastasia
- Anastasiia
- Anastasija
- Anastasiya
- Annastasia
