= Anastasija =

Anastasija (Serbian and Macedonian: Анастасија) is a transliteration of the Greek name Anastasia in Serbian, Macedonian, and Latvian. Its male counterpart is Anastasije (Serbian: Анастасије). It may refer to:

- Anastasija Babović (born 2000), Montenegrin handball player
- Anastasija Grigorjeva (b. 1990), Latvian wrestler
- Anastasija Grišanina (b. 1996), Lithuanian rhythmic gymnast
- Anastasija Khmelnytska (b. 1997), German rhythmic gymnast
- Anastasija Kravčenoka (b. 1997), Latvian beach volleyball player
- Anastasija Ražnatović (b. 1998), Serbian singer and model
- Anastasija Reiberger (b. 1977), Russian-born German pole vaulter
- Anastasija Sevastova (b. 1990), Latvian tennis player
- Anastasija Zolotic (b. 2002), American taekwondo athlete
- Anastasia (band) (est. 1990), Macedonian electronic-music band
- Saint Anastasija, real-named&surnamed: Ana Vukanović (fl. 1166–1196), Serbian queen

== See also ==
- Anastacia (given name)
- Anastasia
- Anastasiia
- Anastasiya
- Annastasia
