= List of Cultural Properties of the Philippines in Sariaya, Quezon =

The following is a list of landmarks designated as cultural properties in Sariaya, a municipality in the province of Quezon, Philippines.

Cultural Property wmph identifier (Note: wmph is an internal identifier used by Wikimedia Philippines to identify the monument. This is not an official identifier, and only shown temporarily in the templates until the government creates an updated complete list.)	Site name	Description	Province	City or municipality	Address	Coordinates	Image
	Sariaya Glorietta	Sariaya Gloretta, inaugurated on 30 December 1924 by Eusebio Cortez	Quezon	Sariaya, Quezon	Sariaya Park	13°57′46″N 121°31′28″E	Upload file
	Matilde Alcala House	Built on 25 August 1932	Quezon	Sariaya, Quezon	43 Magdami St.		Upload Photo
	Teodorico Raymunda House	Built in the 1950s	Quezon	Sariaya, Quezon	38 Argente St. cor. Magdami St.		Upload Photo
	Salvador Abaño House		Quezon	Sariaya, Quezon	Quezon Ave.		Upload Photo
	Delfin and Pacing Emralinan House	Built in the 1930s	Quezon	Sariaya, Quezon	Quezon Ave.		Upload Photo
	Eulalio and Elena de Castro House	Built in the 1930s	Quezon	Sariaya, Quezon	24 Quezon Ave.		Upload Photo
	Solis-Oca House	Built in 1910; adaptive reuse as library	Quezon	Sariaya, Quezon	37 Quezon Ave. cor. P. Gomez St.		Upload Photo
	Larry Baylen House	Built in the 1950s and formerly known as Dr. Rufino Oreta House	Quezon	Sariaya, Quezon	P. Gomez cor. Magdami St.		Upload Photo
	Danila Rama House		Quezon	Sariaya, Quezon	28 Magdami St.		Upload Photo
	Susan Cansanay House	Built in the 1950s and formerly known as Doning Villocillo House	Quezon	Sariaya, Quezon	31 Magdami St.		Upload Photo
	Dr Jose Rizal Monument	Dr Jose Rizal Monument, inaugurated on 30 December 1924 by Eusebio Cortez	Quezon	Sariaya, Quezon	Sariaya Park	13°57′46″N 121°31′27″E	Upload file
	Municipio de Sariaya	Sariaya Municipal Town Hall, built in 1931 in Art Deco Style by Juan Arellano	Quezon	Sariaya, Quezon	Rizal St.	13°57′46″N 121°31′25″E	Upload file
	Alcala Ancestral House	Alcala Ancestral House	Quezon	Sariaya, Quezon		13°52′26″N 121°33′08″E	Upload file
	Emralino-Rodriguez Ancestral House	Emralino-Rodriguez Ancestral House	Quezon	Sariaya, Quezon	Mabini St.	13°57′45″N 121°31′25″E	Upload file
	Dr. Luis B. Manese Ancestral House	Dr. Luis B. Manese Ancestral House	Quezon	Sariaya, Quezon	#1 Mabini cor. Daliz St.	13°57′45″N 121°31′26″E	Upload file
	Isidro Palabrica Ancestral House	Isidro Palabrica Ancestral House	Quezon	Sariaya, Quezon	Bonifacio St.	13°57′45″N 121°31′27″E	Upload file
	Francisco Rodriguez Ancestral House	Francisco Rodriguez Ancestral House	Quezon	Sariaya, Quezon	Bonifacio cor. Daliz Sts.	13°57′45″N 121°31′27″E	Upload file
	Don Cayo Gala Ancestral House	Don Cayo Gala Ancestral House, built after the 1950s	Quezon	Sariaya, Quezon	Rizal cor. Daliz Sts.	13°57′46″N 121°31′29″E	Upload file
	Gala-Enriquez Ancestral House	Gala-Enriquez Ancestral House, built after World War II	Quezon	Sariaya, Quezon	Rizal cor. P. Gomez Sts.	13°57′45″N 121°31′29″E	Upload file
	Algenio House	Algenio House, built in the 1950s	Quezon	Sariaya, Quezon	#43 P. Gomez St.	13°57′44″N 121°31′28″E	Upload file
	Sariaya Bread House Reception Hall	Sariaya Bread House Reception Hall, formerly Joseph Theater, built in 1950s	Quezon	Sariaya, Quezon	Bonifacio cor. P. Gomez St.	13°57′43″N 121°31′28″E	Upload file
	Ruins of Gobernadorcillo Roman Reynoso House	Ruins of Gobernadorcillo Roman Reynoso House, burned in 1944	Quezon	Sariaya, Quezon	Argente cor. Bonifacio Sts.	13°57′41″N 121°31′28″E	Upload file
	De Torres House	De Torres House	Quezon	Sariaya, Quezon	#20 Bonifacio St.	13°57′40″N 121°31′28″E	Upload file
	Cita de la Torre House	Cita de la Torre House, built in 1961	Quezon	Sariaya, Quezon	Bonifacio Street	13°57′39″N 121°31′29″E	Upload file
	Fructoso Alcala House	Fructoso Alcala House, owned by Crispulo Vargas	Quezon	Sariaya, Quezon	Bonifacio cor. De la Cruz St.	13°57′38″N 121°31′29″E	Upload file
	Gala-Rodriguez NHI Heritage House	Gala-Rodriguez Ancestral House, built in 1935 by Juan Nakpil, declared a National Heritage House by the National Historical Institute	Quezon	Sariaya, Quezon	Rizal and Bonifacio Sts.	13°57′43″N 121°31′29″E	Upload file
	Belarmino-Lacandola House	Belarmino-Lacandola House, built in the 1950s	Quezon	Sariaya, Quezon	#63 Mabini St.	13°57′44″N 121°31′25″E	Upload file
	Obordo House	Obordo House, built in the 1950s	Quezon	Sariaya, Quezon	#64 Mabini Street	13°57′43″N 121°31′26″E	Upload file
	Don Benito Cadiz Ancestral House	Don Benito Cadiz Ancestral House, built in the 1950s	Quezon	Sariaya, Quezon	#71 Mabini Street	13°57′42″N 121°31′27″E	Upload file
	Villadiego Ancestral House	Villadiego Ancestral House, owned by Francis Buenafe	Quezon	Sariaya, Quezon	#79 Mabini cor. Argente Street	13°57′39″N 121°31′27″E	Upload file
	Baladad-Valdeavilla Ancestral House Sariaya.JPG	Baladad-Valdeavilla Ancestral House	Quezon	Sariaya, Quezon	79 Mabini cor. Argente Streets	13°57′40″N 121°31′26″E	Upload file
	Religioso-De Villa Ancestral House	Religioso-De Villa Ancestral House, beaux-art house built in the 1910s or 1920s	Quezon	Sariaya, Quezon	#66 Rizal Street	13°57′39″N 121°31′31″E	Upload file
	Mamala I Elementary School	Gabaldon type schoolhouse	Quezon	Sariaya, Quezon	Quezon Ave., Brgy. Mamala I	13°59′38″N 121°31′06″E	Upload file
	Morong Elementary School	Gabaldon type schoolhouse	Quezon	Sariaya, Quezon	Brgy. Morong	13°55′35″N 121°33′13″E	Upload file
	Saint Francis of Assisi Parish Church	Saint Francis of Assisi Parish Church, built in 1748	Quezon	Poblacion, Sariaya, Quezon	4322 Maharlika Highway, Sariaya, Quezon	13°57′49″N 121°31′25″E	Upload file
	St. Joseph Academy of Sariaya Quezon	St. Joseph Academy of Sariaya Quezon, built in 1921	Quezon	Poblacion, Sariaya, Quezon	4322 Maharlika Highway, Sariaya, Quezon	13°57′49″N 121°31′25″E	Upload file
	Parish of Saint Joseph	Aglipayan Church (Iglesia Filipina Independiente)	Quezon	Sariaya, Quezon	Rodriguez cor. Valderas Streets	13°57′51″N 121°31′33″E	Upload file
	Sariaya Institute Main Building	Sariaya Institute Main Building	Quezon	Sariaya, Quezon	Rodriguez del Pilar/Gala Streets	13°57′54″N 121°31′34″E	Upload file
	Silviño Valderas Ancestral House	Silviño Valderas Ancestral House	Quezon	Sariaya, Quezon	Rodriguez Street	13°57′54″N 121°31′32″E	Upload file
	Gregorio Luna-Bitong Ancestral House	Gregorio Luna-Bitong Ancestral House	Quezon	Sariaya, Quezon	Magdami cor. del Pilar Streets	13°57′54″N 121°31′31″E	Upload file
	Lucinio Mendoza Ancestral House	Lucinio Mendoza Ancestral House	Quezon	Sariaya, Quezon	del Pilar Street	13°57′55″N 121°31′31″E	Upload file
	Ester Aldea Ancestral House	Ester Aldea Ancestral House	Quezon	Sariaya, Quezon	Rodriguez Street	13°57′55″N 121°31′32″E	Upload file
	Elenita de los Reyes-Castillo Ancestral House	Elenita de los Reyes-Castillo Ancestral House	Quezon	Sariaya, Quezon	#14 Gala Street	13°57′53″N 121°31′35″E	Upload file
	Doring Alvarez Ancestral House	Doring Alvarez Ancestral House	Quezon	Sariaya, Quezon	Valderas cor. Gala Streets	13°57′51″N 121°31′35″E	Upload file
	Gloria de Luna Ancestral House	Gloria de Luna Ancestral House	Quezon	Sariaya, Quezon	Gala cor. General Luna Streets	13°57′50″N 121°31′36″E	Upload file
	Panganiban Ancestral House	Panganiban Ancestral House	Quezon	Sariaya, Quezon	Valderas Street	13°57′52″N 121°31′38″E	Upload file
	Julieta Barradas Ancestral House	Julieta Barradas Ancestral House	Quezon	Sariaya, Quezon	#17 Pablo Street	13°57′53″N 121°31′36″E	Upload file
	Dra. Felisa Luna Ancestral House	Dra. Felisa Luna Ancestral House	Quezon	Sariaya, Quezon	Dr. Simeon Rodriguez Street	13°57′54″N 121°31′37″E	Upload file
	Juliana Rama Ancestral House	Juliana Rama Ancestral House	Quezon	Sariaya, Quezon	#5255 Dr. Simeon Rodriguez Street	13°57′55″N 121°31′37″E	Upload file
	Estela Alcaneses Ancestral House	Estela Alcaneses Ancestral House	Quezon	Sariaya, Quezon	Dr. Simeon Rodriguez Street	13°57′53″N 121°31′38″E	Upload file
	Boy Dimacali Ancestral House	Boy Dimacali Ancestral House	Quezon	Sariaya, Quezon	Aguas Street	13°57′52″N 121°31′39″E	Upload file
	Nemesio de Castro Ancestral House	Nemesio de Castro Ancestral House	Quezon	Sariaya, Quezon	Aguas Street cor. Gen. Luna Streets	13°57′51″N 121°31′40″E	Upload file
	Quevada Ancestral House	Quevada Ancestral House	Quezon	Sariaya, Quezon	#113 Gen. Luna Street	13°57′51″N 121°31′38″E	Upload file
	Diamante Ancestral House	Diamante Ancestral House	Quezon	Sariaya, Quezon	#33 Gen. Luna Street	13°57′53″N 121°31′44″E	Upload file
	Anastacia Pasahol Ancestral House	Anastacia Pasahol Ancestral House	Quezon	Sariaya, Quezon	Gen. Luna Street	13°57′53″N 121°31′45″E	Upload file
	Felisa Lacopia Ancestral House	Felisa Lacopia Ancestral House	Quezon	Sariaya, Quezon	Gen. Luna cor. Caponpon Streets	13°57′53″N 121°31′46″E	Upload file
	Sofia Mabulay Ancestral House	Sofia Mabulay Ancestral House	Quezon	Sariaya, Quezon	Gen. Luna cor. Caponpon Streets	13°57′53″N 121°31′47″E	Upload file
	Pedrito Laguartilla Ancestral House	Pedrito Laguartilla Ancestral House	Quezon	Sariaya, Quezon	de Chavez cor. Caponpon Streets	13°57′55″N 121°31′45″E	Upload file
	Pining de la Peña (Simeon Gabiola) Ancestral House	Pining de la Peña (Simeon Gabiola) Ancestral House	Quezon	Sariaya, Quezon	#82 Caponpon Street	13°57′58″N 121°31′44″E	Upload file
	Emang Villocillo Ancestral House	Emang Villocillo Ancestral House	Quezon	Sariaya, Quezon	Arellano cor. de Chavez Streets	13°57′54″N 121°31′43″E	Upload file
	Resurreccion Ancestral House	Resurreccion Ancestral House	Quezon	Sariaya, Quezon	Arellano Street	13°57′55″N 121°31′43″E	Upload file
	Avelino and Jocelyn Ibarrola Ancestral House	Avelino and Jocelyn Ibarrola Ancestral House	Quezon	Sariaya, Quezon	Gen. Luna Street		Upload file
	Arturo Ella Ancestral House	Arturo Ella Ancestral House	Quezon	Sariaya, Quezon	Valderas Street	13°57′52″N 121°31′38″E	Upload file
	Familia Rodriguez Mausoleums	Mausoleums built for the Rodriguez family in 1914 and 1926.	Quezon	Sariaya, Quezon	General Luna Street, Sariaya, Quezon Province	13°57′40″N 121°31′10″E	Upload file
	Municipal Cemetery	Sariaya's Municipal Cemetery near the town's Roman Catholic Cemetery.	Quezon	Sariaya, Quezon	General Luna Street, Sariaya, Quezon Province	13°57′42″N 121°31′10″E	Upload file
	Roman Catholic Cemetery		Quezon	Sariaya, Quezon	General Luna Street, Sariaya, Quezon Province	13°57′43″N 121°31′12″E	Upload file
	Old Town Cemetery		Quezon	Sariaya, Quezon	General Luna Street, Sariaya, Quezon Province	13°57′40″N 121°31′10″E	Upload file
	Asuncion Villota House	Built in 1955.	Quezon	Sariaya, Quezon	General Luna Street, Sariaya, Quezon Province	13°57′47″N 121°31′22″E	Upload file
	Sonny Lacandalo House	According to an inscription on the house, it was built on 11 April 1958.	Quezon	Sariaya, Quezon	Reynoso Street, Sariaya, Quezon Province	13°57′47″N 121°31′20″E	Upload file
	Elita Rama Vendiola House		Quezon	Sariaya, Quezon	Reynoso Street, Sariaya, Quezon Province	13°57′48″N 121°31′20″E	Upload file
	Francisco De Castro House		Quezon	Sariaya, Quezon	006 Felino Street	13°57′48″N 121°31′18″E	Upload file
	Maning Gagasa House		Quezon	Sariaya, Quezon	68 P. Burgos Street	13°57′49″N 121°31′15″E	Upload file
	Alcañeses-Cadiz Ancestral House	Constructed in 1933.	Quezon	Sariaya, Quezon	General Luna Corner P. Burgos Street	13°57′45″N 121°31′17″E	Upload file
	Sariaya Credit Cooperative Corp. Multi-Purpose Building	Formerly Maximo Rodriguez Soils Laboratory	Quezon	Sariaya, Quezon	General Luna Street	13°57′45″N 121°31′18″E	Upload file
	Deogracias Alcala Ancestral House		Quezon	Sariaya, Quezon	17 General Luna Street	13°57′46″N 121°31′18″E	Upload file
	Dondon Rondollo House		Quezon	Sariaya, Quezon	General Luna Street	13°57′46″N 121°31′19″E	Upload file
	Froilan Galera Ancestral House		Quezon	Sariaya, Quezon	029 General Luna Street	13°57′46″N 121°31′20″E	Upload file
	Gov. Natalio Enriquez House	1932 Art Deco by Andres Luna de San Pedro	Quezon	Sariaya, Quezon	General Luna corner Rizal Street	13°57′48″N 121°31′28″E	Upload file
	De Luna House		Quezon	Sariaya, Quezon	Rizal corner Valderas Street	13°57′49″N 121°31′28″E	Upload file
	Umilin Family House		Quezon	Sariaya, Quezon	#22 Rizal Street	13°57′51″N 121°31′28″E	Upload file
	Velasco House		Quezon	Sariaya, Quezon	#20 Velasco Street	13°57′51″N 121°31′28″E	Upload file
	Fransico Titic House		Quezon	Sariaya, Quezon	Rizal Street	13°57′52″N 121°31′27″E	Upload file
	Dr. Simeon Rodriguez House		Quezon	Sariaya, Quezon	Rizal corner Valderas Streets	13°57′53″N 121°31′29″E	Upload file
	Gregorio Cadiz House		Quezon	Sariaya, Quezon	Rizal Street	13°57′53″N 121°31′28″E	Upload file
	Felisa Quinto House		Quezon	Sariaya, Quezon	Rizal Street	13°57′53″N 121°31′28″E	Upload file
	Maaliw Family House		Quezon	Sariaya, Quezon	Rizal Street	13°57′53″N 121°31′28″E	Upload file
	Auring Debuyo Torres House		Quezon	Sariaya, Quezon	Rizal corner Del Pilar Street	13°57′54″N 121°31′28″E	Upload file
	Elandia Maleon		Quezon	Sariaya, Quezon		13°57′54″N 121°31′28″E	Upload file
	Leonardo de Guzman House		Quezon	Sariaya, Quezon	# 60 Quezon Avenue	13°57′54″N 121°31′29″E	Upload file
	Fortunato Fegalquin	# 52 Quezon Avenue	Quezon	Sariaya, Quezon	# 60 Quezon Avenue	13°57′54″N 121°31′29″E	Upload file
	Leonora Remojo House		Quezon	Sariaya, Quezon	# 44 Quezon Avenue	13°57′52″N 121°31′29″E	Upload file
	Don Lorenzo de Villa House	Formerly Don Manuel de Villa House	Quezon	Sariaya, Quezon	#88 Quezon Avenue	13°57′51″N 121°31′29″E	Upload file
	Deogeilo de la Torre House		Quezon	Sariaya, Quezon	Quezon Avenue	13°57′51″N 121°31′29″E	Upload Photo
	Myra Tantay House		Quezon	Sariaya, Quezon	Quezon Avenue	13°57′51″N 121°31′30″E	Upload file
	Colegio de Santo Cristo de Burgos	Formerly Felino de Luna House	Quezon	Sariaya, Quezon	Quezon Avenue corner Velderas Street	13°57′50″N 121°31′30″E	Upload file
	Gloria O Obuya House	Formerly Dionisio Dedace House	Quezon	Sariaya, Quezon	Quezon Avenue corner Valderas Street	13°57′50″N 121°31′29″E	Upload file
	Jaime and Agnes Lim House	Formerly Buendia Family house	Quezon	Sariaya, Quezon	Quezon Avenue corner Valderas	13°57′50″N 121°31′30″E	Upload file
	Nemesis Cell Phone Store		Quezon	Sariaya, Quezon	General Luna Street	13°57′49″N 121°31′31″E	Upload file
	Orendain Family House		Quezon	Sariaya, Quezon	General Luna street	13°57′49″N 121°31′31″E	Upload file
	Pablo Manongsong House	Formerly Trillana Family House	Quezon	Sariaya, Quezon	General Luna Street corner Magdami	13°57′49″N 121°31′32″E	Upload file
	United Church of Christ in the Philippines		Quezon	Sariaya, Quezon	Magdami corner Valderas	13°57′51″N 121°31′31″E	Upload file
	Gagolinan House		Quezon	Sariaya, Quezon	# 14 Magdami Street	13°57′52″N 121°31′31″E	Upload file
	Emerson Albiol House		Quezon	Sariaya, Quezon	Magdami Street	13°57′54″N 121°31′30″E	Upload file
	Jumawan - Pabulayan House		Quezon	Sariaya, Quezon	Magdami Street	13°57′54″N 121°31′30″E	Upload file
	Ireneo de Guzman House		Quezon	Sariaya, Quezon	Magdami Street	13°57′54″N 121°31′30″E	Upload file
	Romulo Relavito House		Quezon	Sariaya, Quezon	Magdami Street	13°57′54″N 121°31′29″E	Upload file
	Luisita Guardino House		Quezon	Sariaya, Quezon	Del Pilar Street	13°57′55″N 121°31′29″E	Upload file
	Amado Mendoza House		Quezon	Sariaya, Quezon	#19 del Pilar Street	13°57′55″N 121°31′31″E	Upload file
	Driz Ancestral House	Constructed in 1950s	Quezon	Sariaya, Quezon	92 Mabini cor. Dela Cruz Streets	13°57′37″N 121°31′26″E	Upload file
	Carlos Ancestral House	Constructed in 1940s	Quezon	Sariaya, Quezon	30 Bonifacio cor. Argente Streets	13°57′40″N 121°31′28″E	Upload file
	Cadiz Ancestral House	Constructed in 1947 or 1949	Quezon	Sariaya, Quezon	86 Mabini Street	13°57′40″N 121°31′26″E	Upload file
	Delos Reyes Family Ancestral House	Constructed in early 1900s	Quezon	Sariaya, Quezon	58 Mabini Street	13°57′35″N 121°31′26″E	Upload file
	Fernando Carlos Ancestral House	Constructed in 1949	Quezon	Sariaya, Quezon	56 Mabini Street	13°57′36″N 121°31′27″E	Upload file
	Palomado House	Constructed in 1930s	Quezon	Sariaya, Quezon	25 Bonifacio Street	13°57′37″N 121°31′29″E	Upload Photo
	Severina Venal Ancestral House	Constructed in 1925	Quezon	Sariaya, Quezon	8 Dela Cruz Street	13°57′40″N 121°31′36″E	Upload file
	Rosendo Venal House	Constructed in 1800s	Quezon	Sariaya, Quezon	66 Rizal Street	13°57′39″N 121°31′31″E	Upload file
	Attorney Abanilla Ancestral House	Constructed sometime between 1930s and 1940s	Quezon	Sariaya, Quezon	26 Bonifacio Street	13°57′36″N 121°31′29″E	Upload file
	Jose Anselmo Salameda Ancestral House	Constructed sometime between 1940s and 1960s	Quezon	Sariaya, Quezon	82 Rizal Street	13°57′38″N 121°31′31″E	Upload file
	Mameng Castillo Ancestral House	Constructed in 1912	Quezon	Sariaya, Quezon	34-B Mabini cor. Kasadya Streets	13°57′35″N 121°31′27″E	Upload file
	Dr. Erlinda Salagoste	Constructed in 1920s	Quezon	Sariaya, Quezon	29 Kasadya Street	13°57′35″N 121°31′29″E	Upload file
	Auring Maleon Ancestral House		Quezon	Sariaya, Quezon	Dela Cruz Street	13°57′38″N 121°31′31″E	Upload file
	Belen Tan Ancestral House		Quezon	Sariaya, Quezon	Rizal cor. Argente Streets	13°57′41″N 121°31′30″E	Upload file
	Abrihan Anccestral House	Constructed sometime between 1940s and 1950s	Quezon	Sariaya, Quezon	60-A Mabini Street	13°57′35″N 121°31′26″E	Upload file
	Ramos Ancestral House	Constructed in 1950s	Quezon	Sariaya, Quezon	10 Dela Cruz Street	13°57′39″N 121°31′30″E	Upload file
	Gabaldon Building, Sariaya East Elementary School	Built in 1917	Quezon	Sariaya, Quezon	Rodriguez and Argente Streets	13°57′42″N 121°31′38″E	Upload file
	Home Economics Building, Sariaya East Elementary School	Built in 1940	Quezon	Sariaya, Quezon	Gala corner Argente Streets	13°57′44″N 121°31′38″E	Upload file
	Flagpole, Sariaya East Elementary School	Built in 1925	Quezon	Sariaya, Quezon	Gala Street	13°57′43″N 121°31′38″E	Upload file
	Two Old Fountains, Sariaya East Elementary School		Quezon	Sariaya, Quezon	Gala Street	13°57′43″N 121°31′37″E	Upload file
	Old Fence, Sariaya East Elementary School		Quezon	Sariaya, Quezon	Argente and Rodriguez Street	13°57′43″N 121°31′37″E	Upload file
	Administration Building, Sariaya East Elementary School	Built in 1917	Quezon	Sariaya, Quezon	Argente and Rodriguez Street	13°57′44″N 121°31′37″E	Upload file
	Trade Building, Sariaya East Elementary School	Built in 1917	Quezon	Sariaya, Quezon	Argente and Rodriguez Street	13°57′45″N 121°31′38″E	Upload file
	Intermediate Building, Sariaya East Elementary School	Built during the postwar years	Quezon	Sariaya, Quezon	Argente and Rodriguez Streets	13°57′45″N 121°31′36″E	Upload file
	Annex Building, Sariaya East Elementary School	Built during the postwar years	Quezon	Sariaya, Quezon	P. Gomez Street	13°57′46″N 121°31′36″E	Upload file
	Godofredo Labitoria Ancestral House		Quezon	Sariaya, Quezon	Daliz cor. Gala Streets	13°57′48″N 121°31′34″E	Upload file
	Milena Luna Magadia Ancestral House	Built in the 1960s	Quezon	Sariaya, Quezon	Daliz cor. Gala Streets	13°57′48″N 121°31′34″E	Upload file
	Pury Palomera Ancestral House	Built in the 1920s	Quezon	Sariaya, Quezon	Daliz Street	13°57′48″N 121°31′37″E	Upload file
	Salvador Salcedo Ancestral House		Quezon	Sariaya, Quezon	Daliz Street	13°57′48″N 121°31′37″E	Upload file
	Unknown Ancestral House in #22 Pablo Street	Built during the postwar years	Quezon	Sariaya, Quezon	#22 Pablo Street	13°57′48″N 121°31′37″E	Upload file
	Baysa-Villoso Family Ancestral House	Built in 1927	Quezon	Sariaya, Quezon	General Luna Street	13°57′50″N 121°31′38″E	Upload file
	Manolito Cerrudo Ancestral House	Built in 1930s	Quezon	Sariaya, Quezon	#122 General Luna Street	13°57′50″N 121°31′40″E	Upload file
	Juliana de Luna Ancestral House		Quezon	Sariaya, Quezon	General Luna Street	13°57′49″N 121°31′35″E	Upload file
	Juanito and Rexie Manigbas Ancestral House	Built in the early 1960s	Quezon	Sariaya, Quezon	Daliz Street	13°57′49″N 121°31′42″E	Upload file
	Angelita Rama Ancestral House	Built in the 1940s	Quezon	Sariaya, Quezon	Rodriguez corner Daliz Street	13°57′47″N 121°31′33″E	Upload file
	Biscocho-Gala Ancestral House	Built in the 1950s	Quezon	Sariaya, Quezon	Rodriguez Street	13°57′46″N 121°31′33″E	Upload file
	Pabling Sia Ancestral House	Built in the 1930s	Quezon	Sariaya, Quezon	#87 General Luna Street	13°57′49″N 121°31′34″E	Upload file
	Dr. Restituto Palomera Ancestral House	Built in the 1950s	Quezon	Sariaya, Quezon	General Luna Street	13°57′49″N 121°31′35″E	Upload file
	Tumbaga Ruins	Ruins of the Tumbaga church circa 1703. Abandoned due to frequent Moro raids and an earthquake in 1743	Quezon	Sariaya, Quezon	Mabini Street	13°57′46″N 121°31′28″E	Upload file
	Our Lady of Mount Carmel Seminary	Established in 1942 by Bishop Alfredo Versoza. Notable alumni include Cardinal Ricardo Vidal and Archbishop Angel Lagdameo	Quezon	Sariaya, Quezon	Mabini Street	13°57′17″N 121°31′26″E	Upload file
	Doña Margarita Rodriguez House	Beaux style architecture house built around the 1950s	Quezon	Sariaya, Quezon	Rizal St.	13°57′47″N 121°31′30″E	Upload file
	Don Lucio Rodriguez House	Built in 1910s	Quezon	Sariaya, Quezon	Rizal St.	13°57′47″N 121°31′30″E	Upload file
	Don Catalino Rodriguez House	Declared by the National Historical Commission of the Philippines as a Heritage House; built in 1922	Quezon	Sariaya, Quezon	Rizal St. cor. Daliz St. cor. Quezon Ave.	13°57′47″N 121°31′30″E	Upload file
	Mariano Enriquez House	Built in the 1930s	Quezon	Sariaya, Quezon	Rizal St.	13°57′41″N 121°31′31″E	Upload file
	Carlos Tan House		Quezon	Sariaya, Quezon	Rizal St.	13°57′40″N 121°31′31″E	Upload file
	Florencio Enriquez House	Built in the 1930s	Quezon	Sariaya, Quezon	Rizal cor. Dela Cruz Sts.	13°57′39″N 121°31′31″E	Upload file
	Filomena Lagustan House	Modernist architecture house built in the 1950s	Quezon	Sariaya, Quezon	10 Dela Cruz cor. Geronimo St.	13°57′39″N 121°31′32″E	Upload file
	Belen Espinas House	Built in the 1950s	Quezon	Sariaya, Quezon	Argente cor. Geronimo Sts.	13°57′41″N 121°31′32″E	Upload file
	Ester Dedace-Alcala House	Built in the 1950s	Quezon	Sariaya, Quezon	Argente St. cor. Quezon Ave.	13°57′41″N 121°31′33″E	Upload file
	Clemente and Ofelia Jumawan House	Built in the 1950s	Quezon	Sariaya, Quezon	20 Quezon Ave.	13°57′40″N 121°31′33″E	Upload file
	Julita Vendiola House	Built in the 1930s	Quezon	Sariaya, Quezon	13 De La Cruz St.	13°57′39″N 121°31′33″E	Upload file
	Zenaida Alcance Valderas House		Quezon	Sariaya, Quezon	17 De La Cruz St. cor. Quezon Ave.	13°57′40″N 121°31′33″E	Upload file
	Belen Obispo House	Built in the 1930s	Quezon	Sariaya, Quezon	21 De La Cruz St.	13°57′39″N 121°31′34″E	Upload file
	Paulina Lardizabal Lontok House	Built in the 1930s	Quezon	Sariaya, Quezon	De La Cruz cor. Magdami Sts.	13°57′40″N 121°31′35″E	Upload file
	Belen Sedenio House	Built in the 1950s	Quezon	Sariaya, Quezon	29 De La Cruz St.	13°57′40″N 121°31′34″E	Upload file
	Villareal House	Built in the 1930s	Quezon	Sariaya, Quezon	De La Cruz St. cor. Quezon Ave.	13°57′39″N 121°31′34″E	Upload file
	Federico Obnial House	Built in the 1950s	Quezon	Sariaya, Quezon	9 Quezon Ave.	13°57′38″N 121°31′34″E	Upload file
	Freddie Rodriguez House		Quezon	Sariaya, Quezon	5 Quezon Ave.	13°57′38″N 121°31′35″E	Upload file
	Victoriano Armamento House	Built in the 1950s	Quezon	Sariaya, Quezon	Magdami St.	13°57′38″N 121°31′36″E	Upload Photo
	Samor Obleno House		Quezon	Sariaya, Quezon	55 Magdami St.	13°57′39″N 121°31′36″E	Upload file
