= Anastasiia Smirnova =

Anastasiia Smirnova may refer to:

- Anastasia Smirnova (ballet dancer) (Анастасия Викторовна Смирнова; born 2001), Russian ballet dancer
- Anastasia Smirnova (freestyle skier) (Анастасия Андреевна Смирнова; born 2002), Russian freestyle skier
- Anastasiia Smirnova (figure skater) (Анастасія Смірнова; born 2004), Ukrainian-American pair skater
