= Annastasia =

Annastasia is a feminine given name. Notable people with this name include

- Annastasia Baker (born 1988), British Gospel singer and song writer
- Annastasia Batikis (1927 – 2016), American baseball player
- Annastasia Raj (born 1975), Malaysian racewalker

== See also ==
- Annastacia Palaszczuk (born 1969), Australian politician
- Anastacia (given name)
- Anastasia
- Anastasiia
- Anastasija
- Anastasiya
