= Anastasiya Chernenko =

Ukrainian triathlete (born 1990)

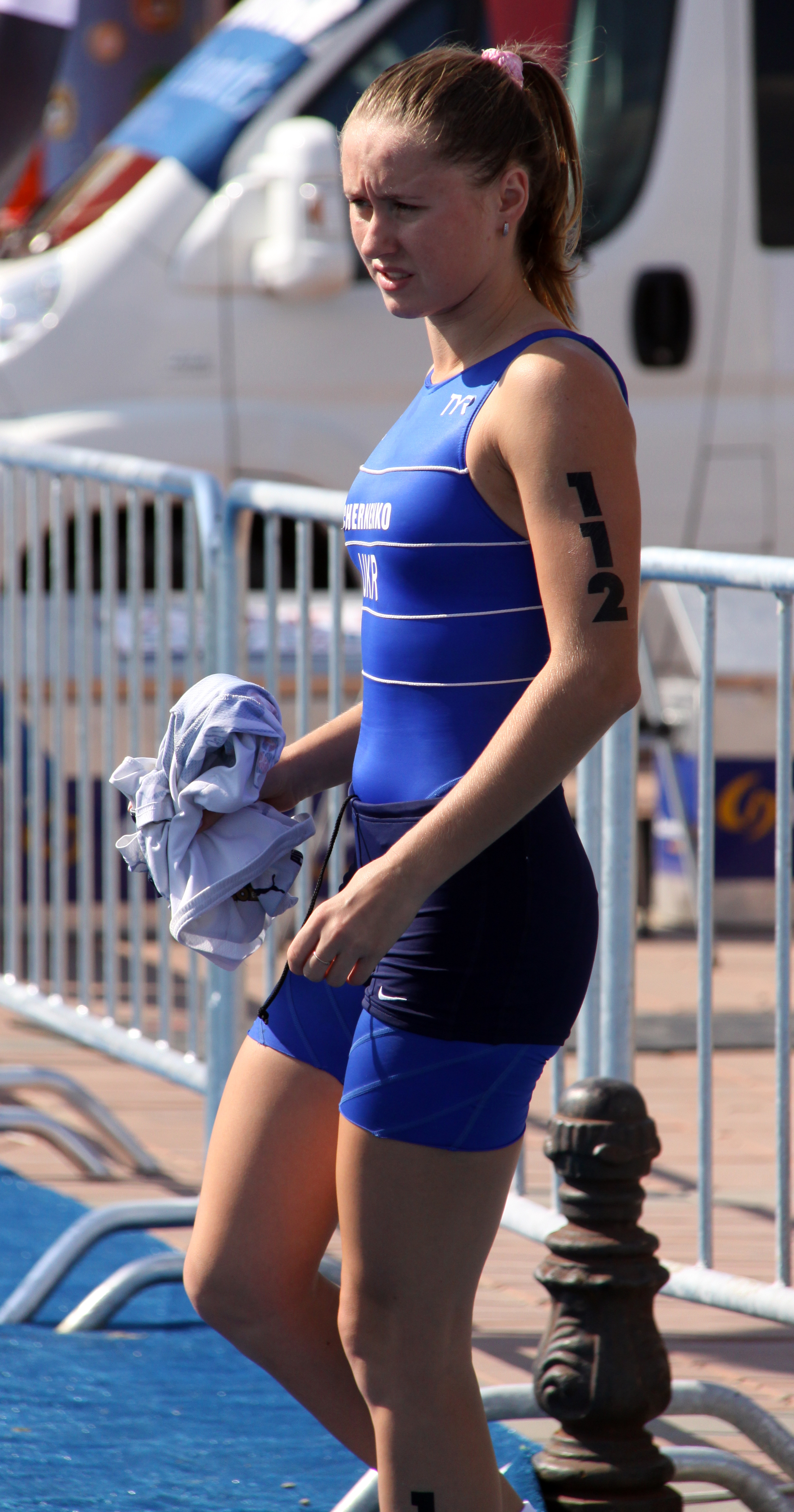
Anastasiya Chernenko at the Premium European Cup triathlon in Alanya, 2010.

Anastasiya Chernenko (Ukrainian Анастасія Михайлівна Черненко; born 11 October 1990 in Zhytomir) is a professional Ukrainian triathlete, winner of the Ukrainian Triathlon Cup 2010, and reserve member of the National Team. Chernenko is decorated with the prestigious title Master of Sports (Мастер спорта) and started to take part in ITU Elite triathlons in 2009.

== ITU Competitions ==
The following list is based upon the official ITU rankings and the ITU Athletes's Profile Page. Unless indicated otherwise, the following events are triathlons (Olympic Distance) and refer to the Elite category.

Date	Competition	Place	Rank
2009-06-20	European Cup (Junior)	Tarzo Revine	12
2009-07-02	European Championships (Junior)	Holten	41
2009-08-30	Premium European Cup	Kedzierzyn Kozle	32
2010-04-17	European Cup	Antalya	18
2010-08-28	European Championships (U23)	Vila Nova de Gaia (Porto)	17
2010-09-08	Dextro Energy World Championship Series, Grand Final: U23 World Championships	Budapest	30
2010-10-24	Premium European Cup	Alanya	26
2011-04-09	European Cup	Quarteira	27
2011-07-03	European Cup	Penza	14
2011-08-14	World Cup	Tiszaújváros	47

DNF = did not finish · DNS = did not start
