= Anastasia Smirnova (ballet dancer) =

Russian ballet dancer (born 2001)

Anastasia Smirnova Анастасия Смирнова
- Born: Anastasia Viktorovna Smirnova; 8 May 2001 (age 25); Saint Petersburg, Russia
- Occupation: Ballet dancer
- Years active: 2020–present
- Dancing career
- Current group: Mikhailovsky Theatre
- Former groups: Mariinsky Ballet

Anastasia Viktorovna Smirnova (Russian: Анастасия Викторовна Смирнова; born 8 May 2001, St. Petersburg) is a Russian ballet dancer, the soloist of the Mikhailovsky Theatre (St. Petersburg), the winner of the International Ballet Artist Competition Vaganova-Prix, (2018), and the winner of the Moscow International Ballet Artist Competition (2022).

== Career ==
In 2020 she graduated from the Vaganova Academy of Russian Ballet (teacher - Kovaleva L. V.) and was invited to the troupe of the Mikhailovsky Theatre as a soloist.

She performed leading parties in the ballets «Don Quixote», «Coppelia», «La fille mal gardée», «La Bayadère», «The Nutcracker», and «Laurencia (ballet)». The repertoire also includes Gulnara («Le Corsaire») and Odillia («Swan Lake»).

In the 2021/2022 season, she worked at the Mariinsky Theatre, performed solo parts, and then in March 2022 she returned to the Mikhailovsky Theatre.

In June 2022 she received the second prize (the first prize was awarded to no one) at the 14th Moscow International Ballet Competition.

In the 2022/23 season, Anastasia Smirnova performed the parts of Cinderella and Juliet, for the first time at the Mikhailovsky Theater and took part in the festivals named after Galina Ulanova in Yoshkar-Ola and Rudolf Nureyev in Kazan.

As a guest soloist, she dances leading parties in ballets on the stage of the Novosibirsk Opera and Ballet Theatre.

== Awards ==
- The award of Diana Vishneva (2016).
- The first prize of the VIII International Contest Vaganova-Prix (2018).
- The silver medal for the second place (prize for the first place was not awarded) in the «Solo» category at the XIV Moscow International Competition of Ballet Artists (2022).
