= Anastasiia Masiutkina =

Ukrainian blogger and model (born 1985)

Anastasiia Masiutkina D’Ambrosio
- Born: Anastasiia Masiutkina; 9 November 1985 (age 40); Nikopol, UkSSR
- Education: Kyiv National Linguistic University
- Height: 1.77 m (5 ft 10 in)

Anastasiia Masiutkina D’Ambrosio (born 9 November 1985) is a Ukrainian lifestyle blogger and model. She is also known as a founder of the conference Bloggers Forum, and a contributing author of Elle Ukraine.

== Career ==
Maksyutkina is a Ukrainian blogger. In 2014, she created her lifestyle blog. Through her blog, she has worked with Saint Laurent and Bulgari. Masiutkina has written for magazines Marie Claire, Vogue, L’Officiel and jetsetter.ua. She is a permanent contributor to Elle Ukraine.

Masiutkina worked at Fashion TV in 2015, and hosted the Cosmopolitan Awards in 2017.

In 2018 Masiutkina founded the conference Bloggers Forum with the scope of empowering Ukrainian bloggers to achieve more visibility at international level and creating collaboration opportunities between Ukrainian bloggers and local and international businesses. At the forum, she participated as a panelist of experts from mass-media and IT business.

== Awards ==
In 2017, Masiutkina received the Elle Style Award from Elle Ukraine as "style influencer". The results of the Elle Style Awards were presented on their 10th anniversary on 7 November.

Masiutkina's venture was named in 2018 by Elle Ukraine's Fashion Awards as the best Fashion Start-Up of the year.

On 14 March 2019, Masiutkina was awarded 'Muse of the year' at the Mon Guerlain Inspiration Awards.

== Personal life ==
Masiutkina married businessman Teodoro D’Ambrosio on 25 July 2015 at Lake Como. The couple currently lives in Lugano, Switzerland, where she often travels into Milan for work.
