= Gala–Rodriguez Ancestral House =

Gala–Rodriguez Heritage House
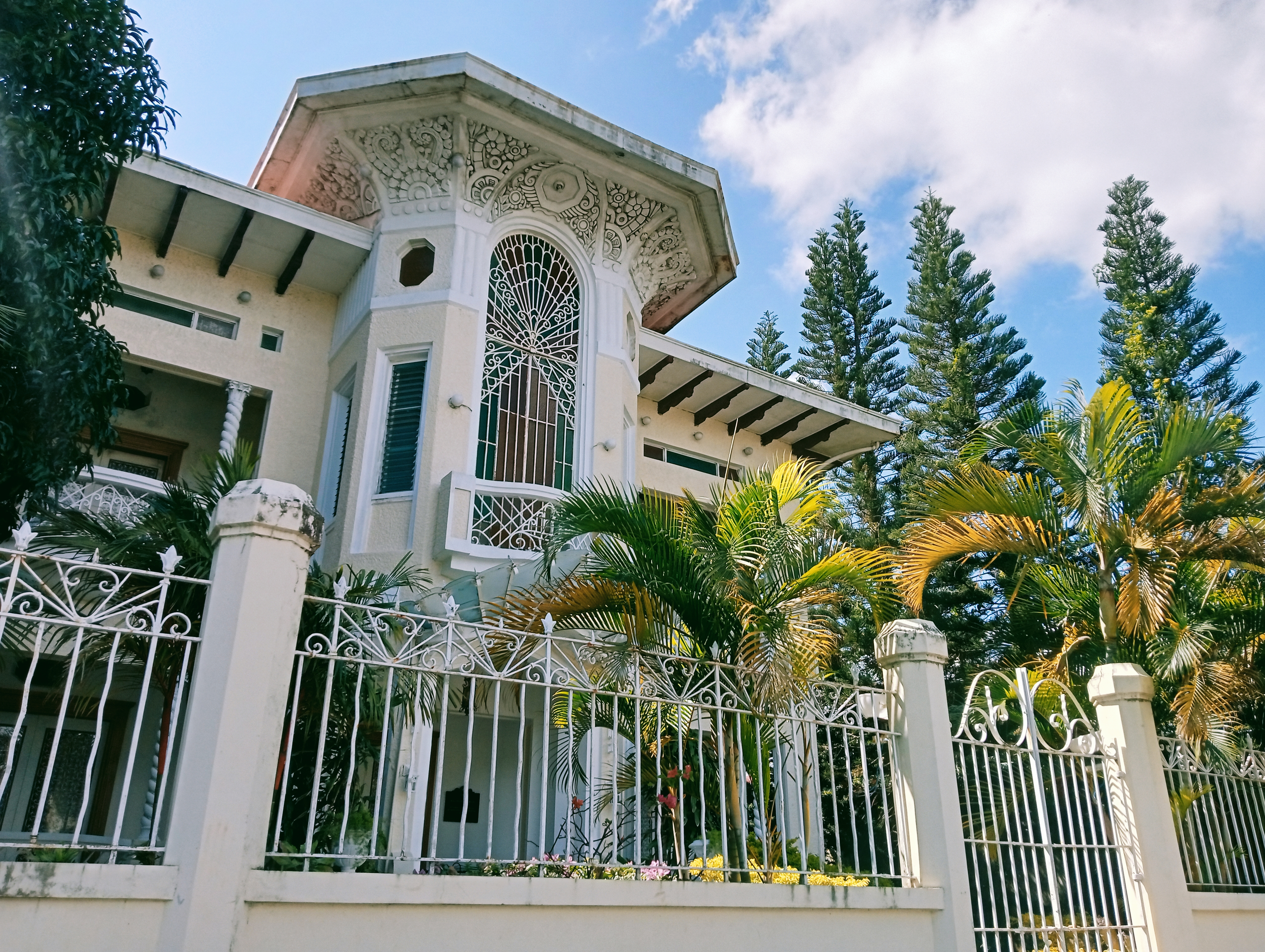
- Gala–Rodriguez House facade

General information
- Type: House
- Architectural style: Art Deco style
- Classification: Heritage House (National Historical Institute)
- Location: Poblacion, Sariaya, Quezon, (Region IV-A) Philippines
- Coordinates: 13.961951°N 121.524808°E
- Completed: May 4, 1935

Design and construction
- Architect: Dr. Juan Nakpil

Gala–Rodriguez house is a house designated by the National Historical Institute of the Philippines as one of the three heritage houses in Sariaya, due to its notable historical and cultural significance. Designed by Juan Nakpil in the early 1930s, it was owned by one of the most distinguished couples in Quezon , Dr. Isidro Rodriguez and Doña Gregoria Gala. The house is located in Rizal Street along with other opulent houses owned by the illustrados of old Sariaya.

== History ==
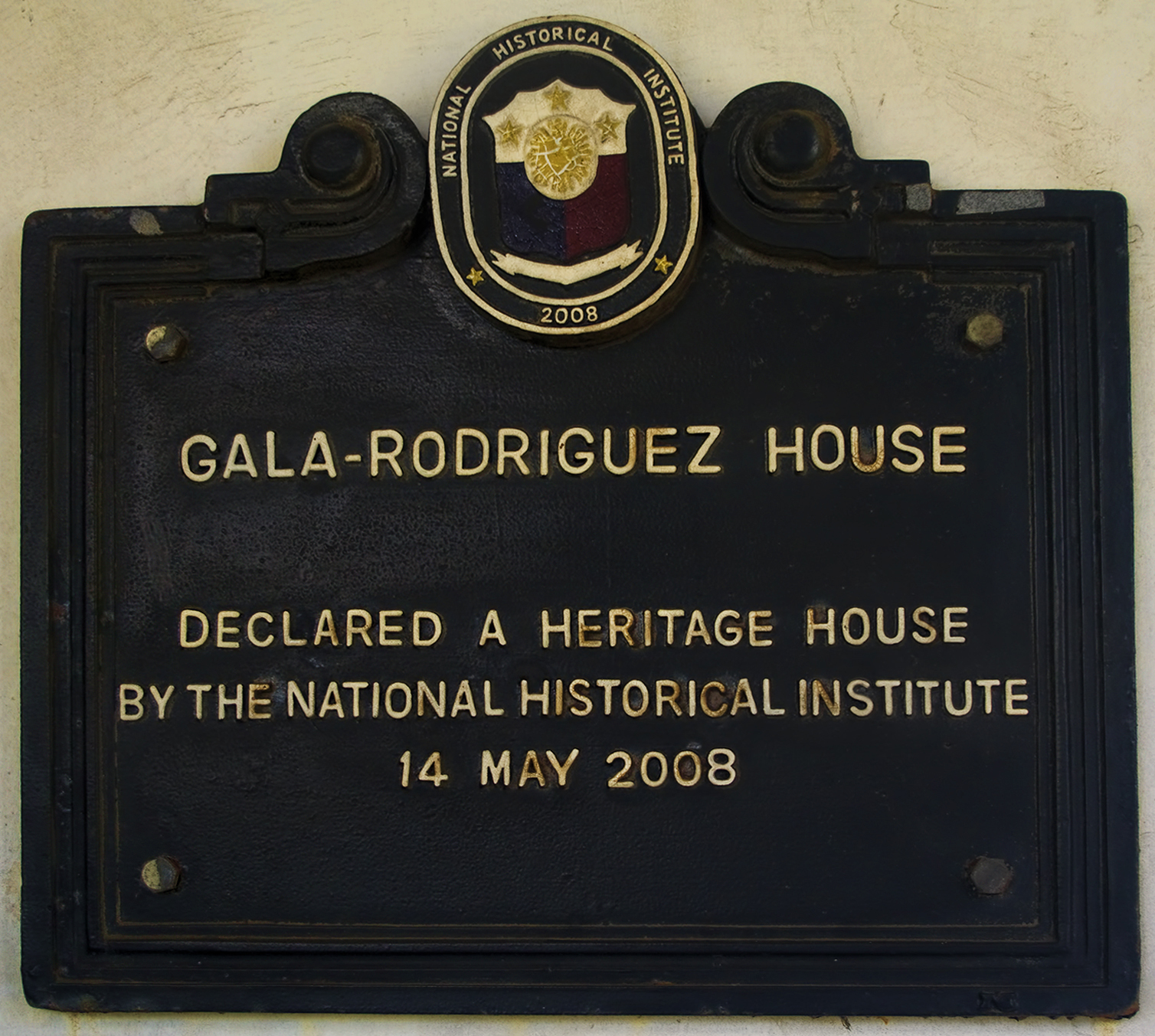
Historical Marker Gala–Rodriguez House given by the National Historical Institute, May 14, 2008

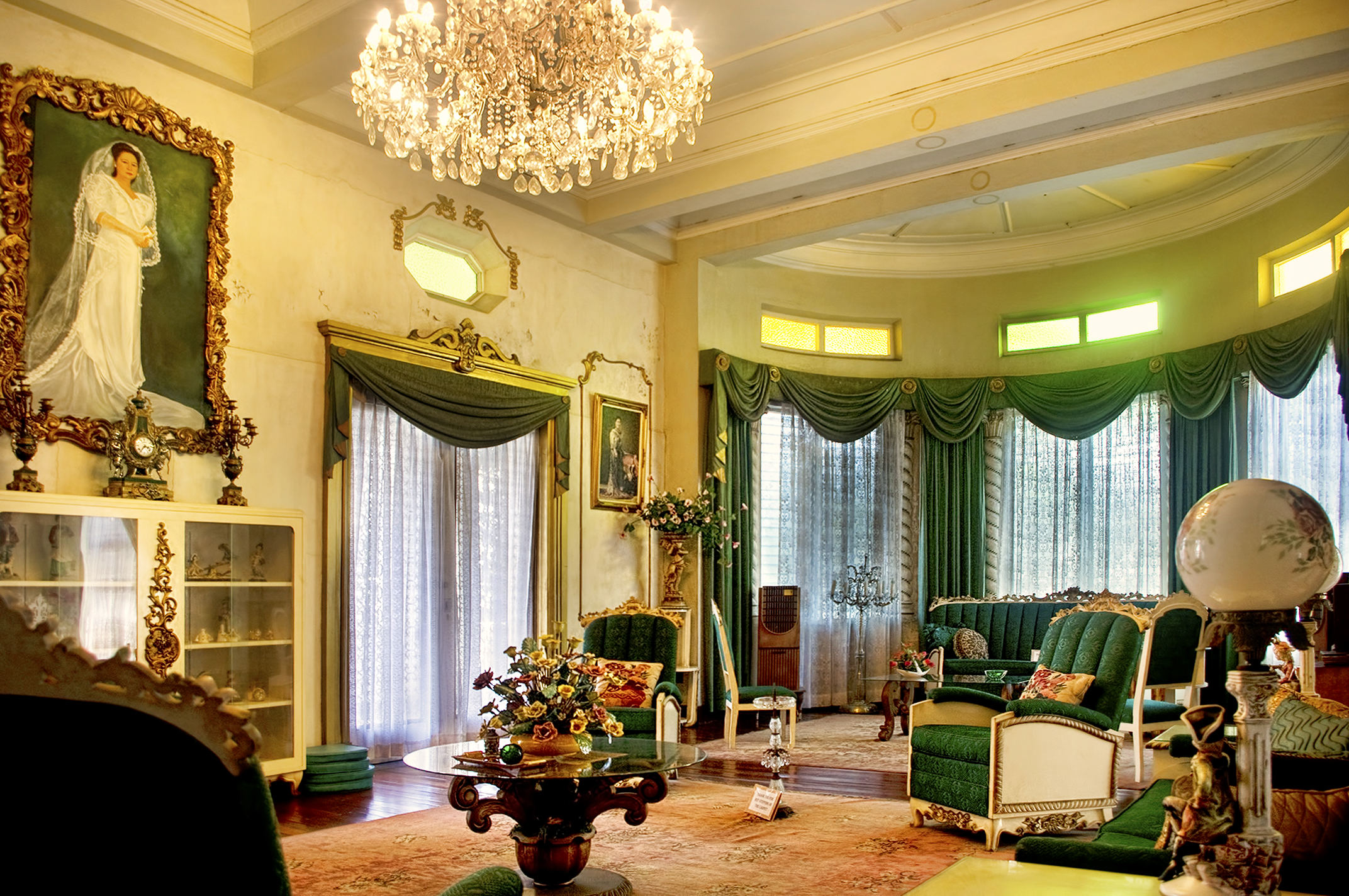
The Gala–Rodriguez House, second receiving area at the 2nd floor

The Gala–Rodriguez mansion was built in the 1930s as Dr. Isidro Rodriguez' gift to his ailing wife, Doña Gregoria, who had long wished to have her dream house for their seven children. During the house construction, Sariaya and the province of Quezon were suffering from a crisis brought by a pest called leaf miners. Most of the coconut plantations which were the primary source of income in Quezon were greatly affected. In this depressing period, Doña Gregoria feared that the house may not be finished in full but the crisis later proved to be beneficial for them because the labor cost went down to 50 centavos per day and P12.00 for the master carpenter. On May 4, 1935, in time for Doña Gregoria's birthday the house was finally completed and the family decided to occupy the place. Unfortunately, two days before her birthday, Doña Gregoria died of her illness.

In 1942, during World War II, Japanese Imperial Officers used the house as their headquarter. Three Japanese Officials occupied the second floor while the family was allowed to stay at the ground floor. According to the current owner of the house, one of the Japanese Officers, General Ashima, fell in love and courted Carmen, the oldest daughter of the owner. To win Carmen's heart, General Ashima would provide the family with supply of foods and clothing materials. He would also serenade Carmen by playing the guitar and by dedicating love songs for the beautiful lady. Nonetheless, the family was doubtful about the real intention of the Japanese officer so they would hide Carmen in the Cellar.

When the guerillas learned that there were Japanese Officers occupying the house, they intentionally informed the Americans who were about to liberate Manila at that time. The guerillas sent a map to the American forces to bomb the whole house. Before the planned destruction took place, residents of Sariaya already fled to the barrios for their safety. They did not inform the owners of the house because they fear that General Ashima might follow Carmen. Luckily a good friend of the family went back to tip them of the planned bombing and on the same day, the whole family evacuated.

Three bombs were dropped in the vicinity of the house. The first one hit the front part of the property and exploded at the gate. The second one was dropped behind the house and created a 20- foot- deep crater. The third one directly hit the house and landed in the stairs but it did not explode.

When the whole town was looted after the bombing, the Gala–Rodriguez House was spared because no one dared to enter the house for the fear that the bomb might explode anytime, not a single piece of furniture was lost. Later, the bomb was moved to the garage with the help of some residents.

A week after the bombing, the house became the venue for a welcome party dedicated to the US Air force. In the midst of the celebration, Exal, the younger sister of Carmen told one American soldier about the bomb that was kept in the garage. Immediately, the party stopped and everyone was alarmed. A bomb disposal unit was called by the American forces to check the bomb and found out that it was live. The bomb squad unit successfully removed the bomb and finally the house was out of danger.

Life moved on and Doña Carmen took charge of the house. In 1950's, she married Judge Vicente Arguelles and they had one child, Gladiola, also known as Ineng. It was this time when the family decided that the crater created by the bomb explosion at the back of the house be turned into the biggest and deepest swimming pool but it was later downsized into 15- foot deep pool which is equivalent to a two-storey building.

In 1960's, Sariaya was struck again by another disaster and it was known as the great fire. Doña Carmen had already given instruction to throw the furniture at the pool to save them but another stroke of luck happened. The flames that were about to destroy the house were fanned away by the wind.

The grand daughter of the original owner, Galdiola Arguelles-Cabuñag is now the owner and the one who maintains the historical house.

As quoted from the official brochure of the ancestral house, “The Ancestral home, having survived theses series of both tragic and momentous events cannot simply be attributed to some good luck. It certainly was blessed and preserved for a definite and meaningful purpose.”.

== House features ==
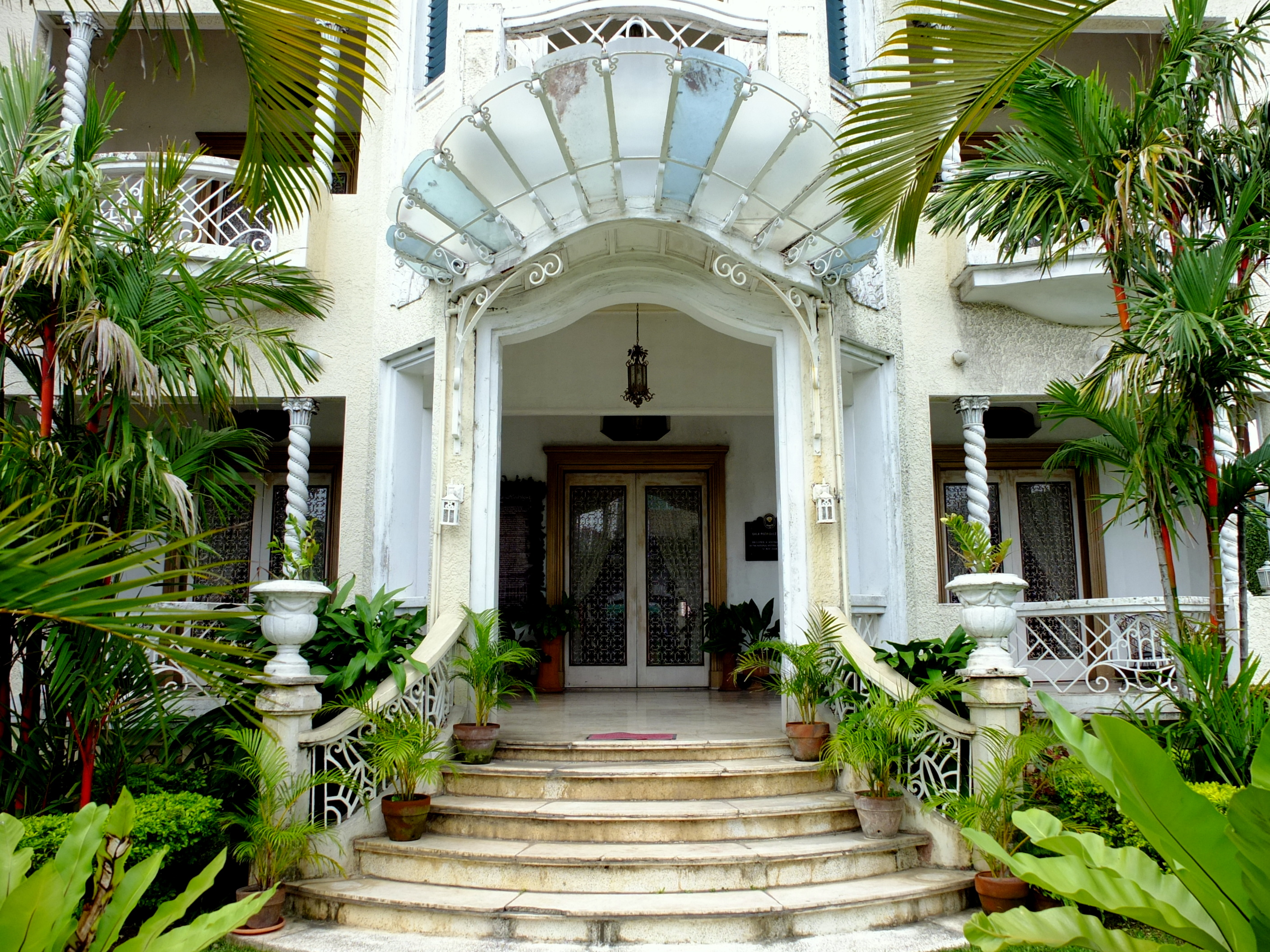
Entrance

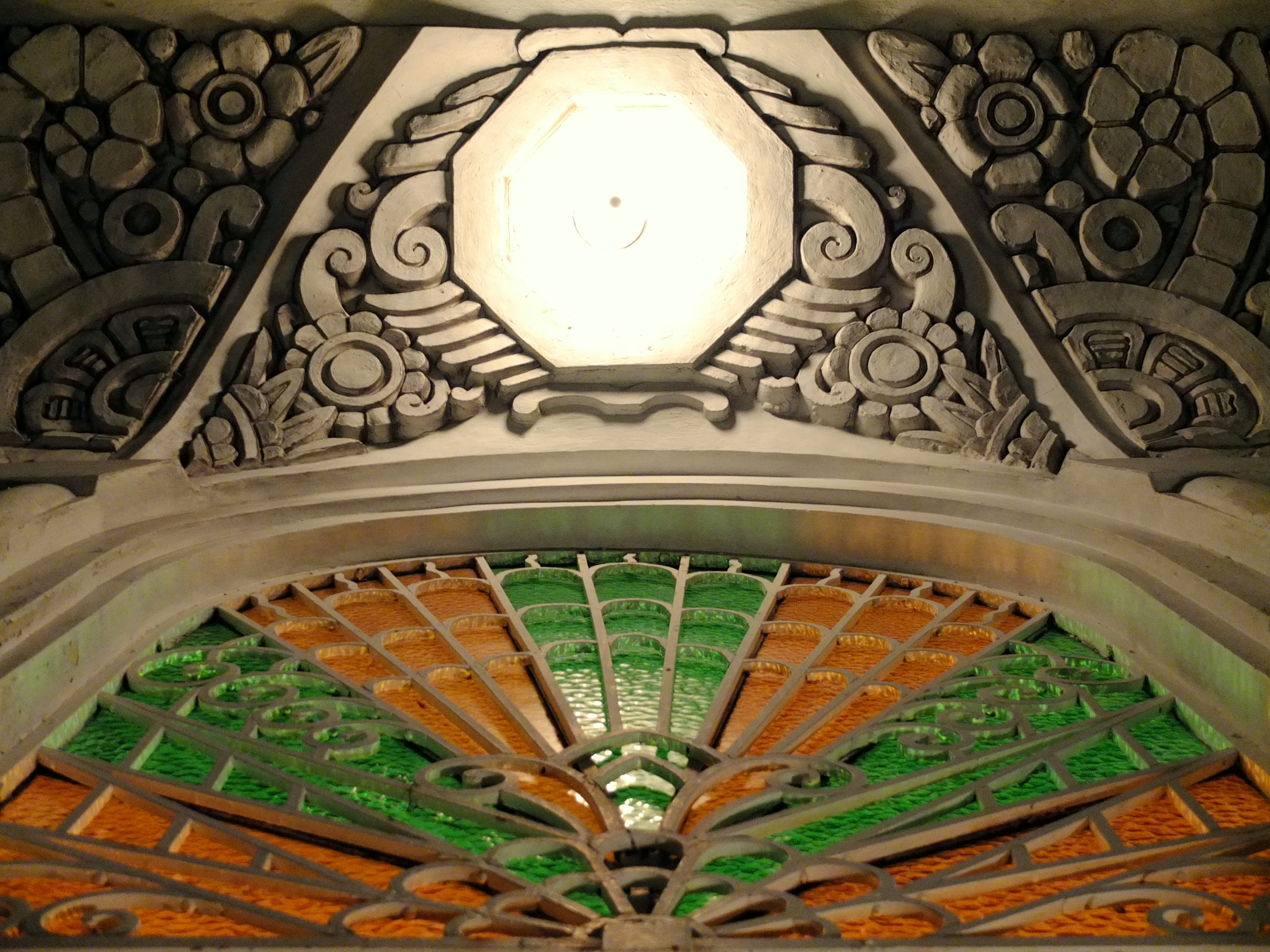
Close up of facade

The Gala–Rodriguez heritage house is one of the Art Deco houses that flourished in Sariaya, Quezon during the pre-war era in the Philippines. The house most prominent features are the fan-shaped front entrance glass canopy and the art deco relieves that decorates the mirador of the house. The house features two receiving rooms, several bedrooms, two dining halls, a prayer room, and an intricately designed veranda. At the back is a terrace overlooking a 15-foot-deep swimming pool and a private garden with a gazebo.

Most of the fixtures and furniture inside the house are of American and European origins. The crafted wooden pieces of furniture was designed and manufactured by Manila's leading furniture atelier, Don Gonzalo Puyat. Exquisite table wares are also on display and large wall mirror greets every visitor in the receiving area. A 19th century grand piano is also in the receiving area complemented by a vintage wooden radio in one corner of the room.

According to Eric Dedace, a tour guide and PRO of Sariaya Tourism Council, the real charm of the house are the stories tied to this historical house most especially during the wartime era concerning Carmen, the beautiful daughter of Dr. Isidro. Her stories are one of the highlights of a guided tour that gives a picture of what life is in old Sariaya.

=== First floor ===
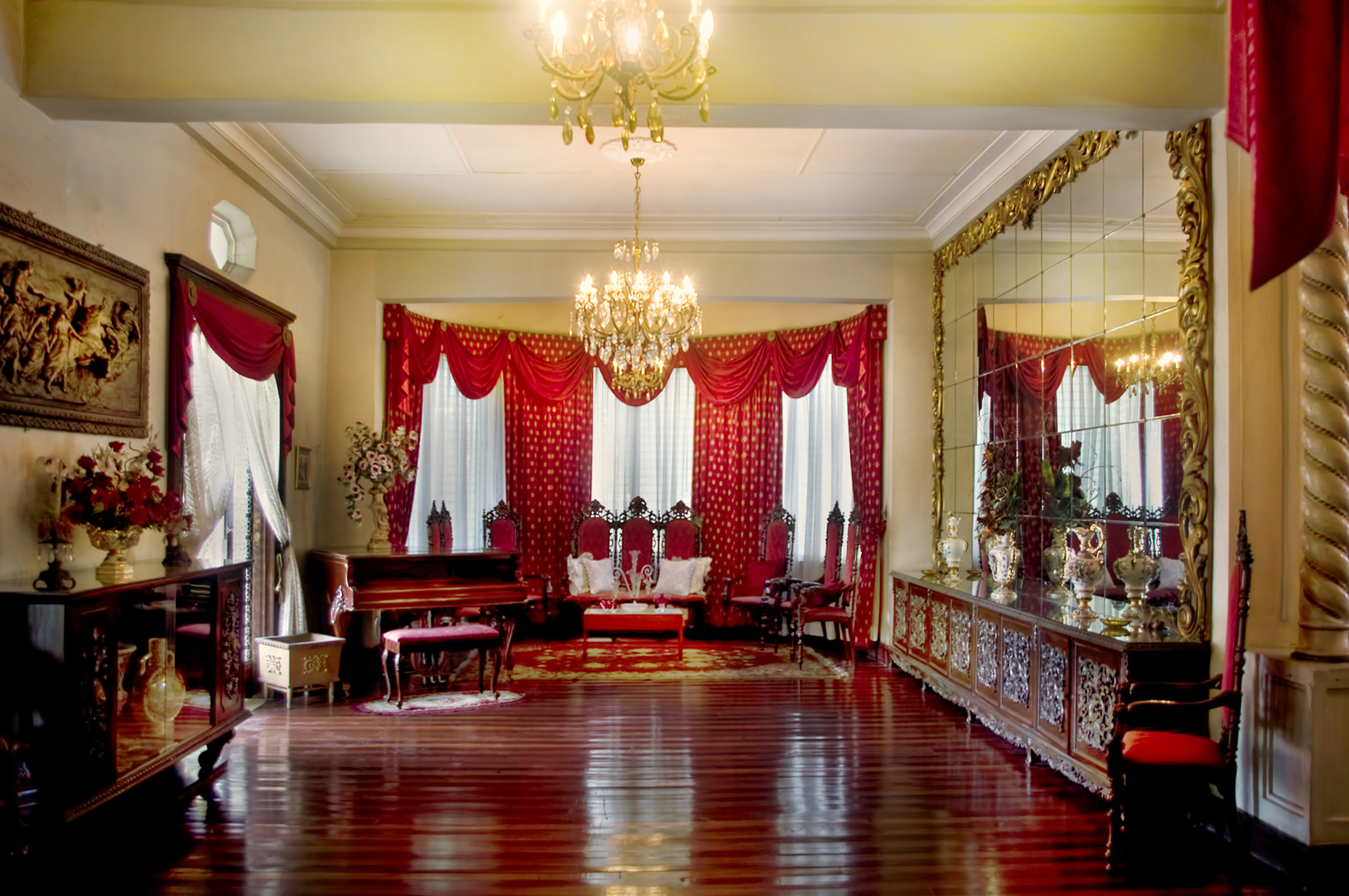
One of two receiving areas of the Gala–Rodriguez house.

On the first floor is the first of two receiving rooms of the house, a dining area, and a study room which also served as Dr. Isidro's office. Inside the office is a wooden cabinet where clothes, pictures and other personal belongings and memorabilia of the eldest child in the family, the beautiful Doña Carmen, are exhibited. Old pictures of the different areas of the house are also displayed inside because these were Doña Carmen's way of reminding the maids how they should fix the curtains, furniture and other fixtures back in place when they are removed for cleaning. The owner of the house wants everything to be in exact place and arranged in the original manner.

On the left side of the staircase, is the dining area where a classic and elegant table arrangement is on display. The set up is complemented by silver and china ware with golden and satin table cloths. Hidden under the dining room carpet is a passage that leads to the cellar of the house.

=== Cellar ===
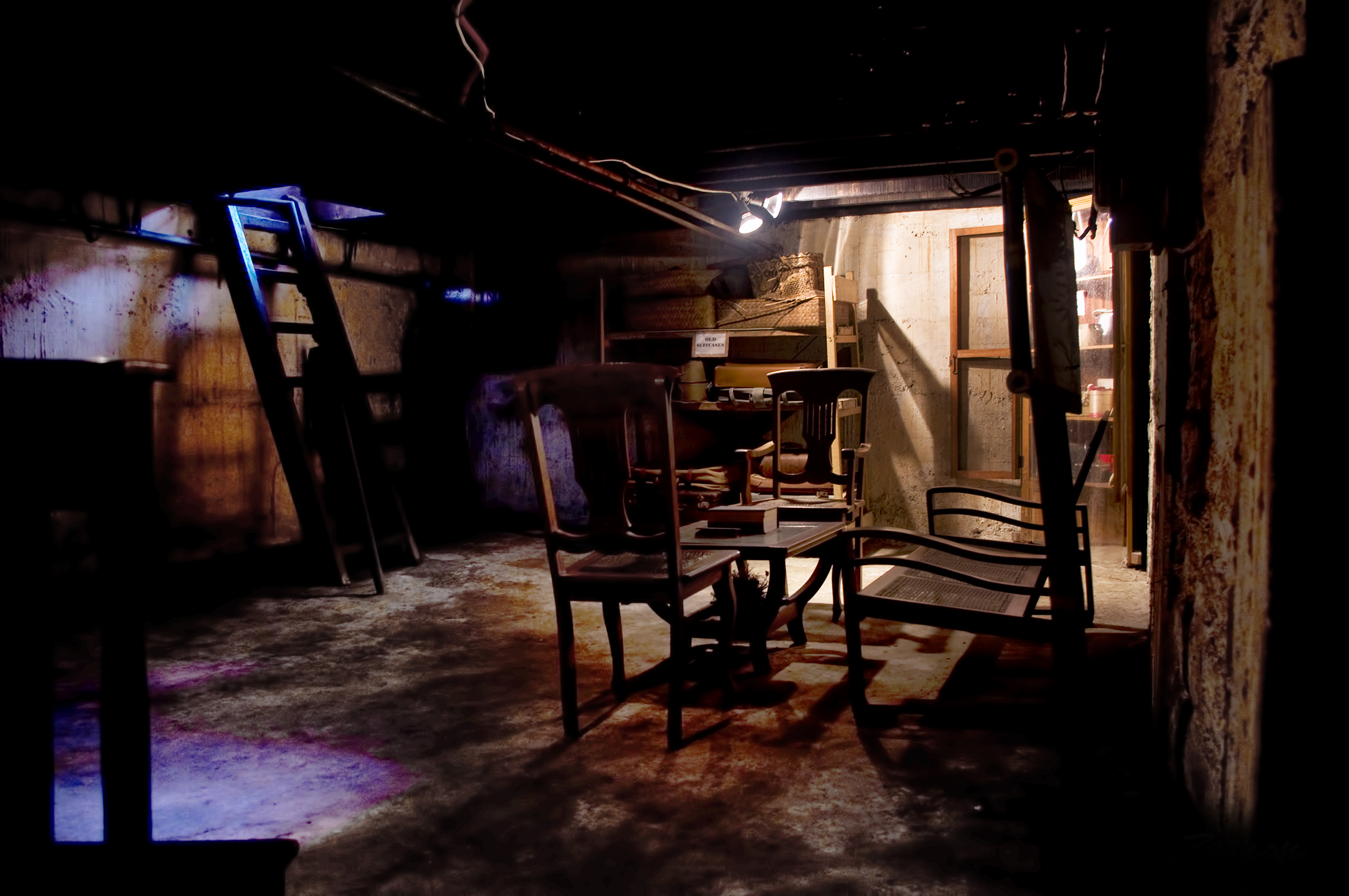
The Gala–Rodriguez House cellar, the hiding place of Dona Carmen during the Japanese era

The Cellar used to be the hiding place of Carmen during the Japanese era. According to the current owner of the house, the family of Carmen would often hide her in the cellar because a high-ranking Japanese official, General Ashima, was after her beauty but the family was doubtful of the General's real intentions. The young Carmen would often stay there for days with her Yaya.

Today, the cellar has been turned into a museum. Some of the family's antique belongings are on displayed including Carmen's shoes, the family travel luggage and bags, a collection of old bottles and tin cans from different makes and brands, unused vintage art deco light fixtures and some vintage car plates. An old image of Virgin Mary in a wooden frame is bolted on the wall and below it is a wooden kneeler of Carmen that she uses when praying the rosary. Below the passage leading to the dining area is a small door that opens at the back gate of the house which they call "the secret passage to freedom".

=== Second floor ===
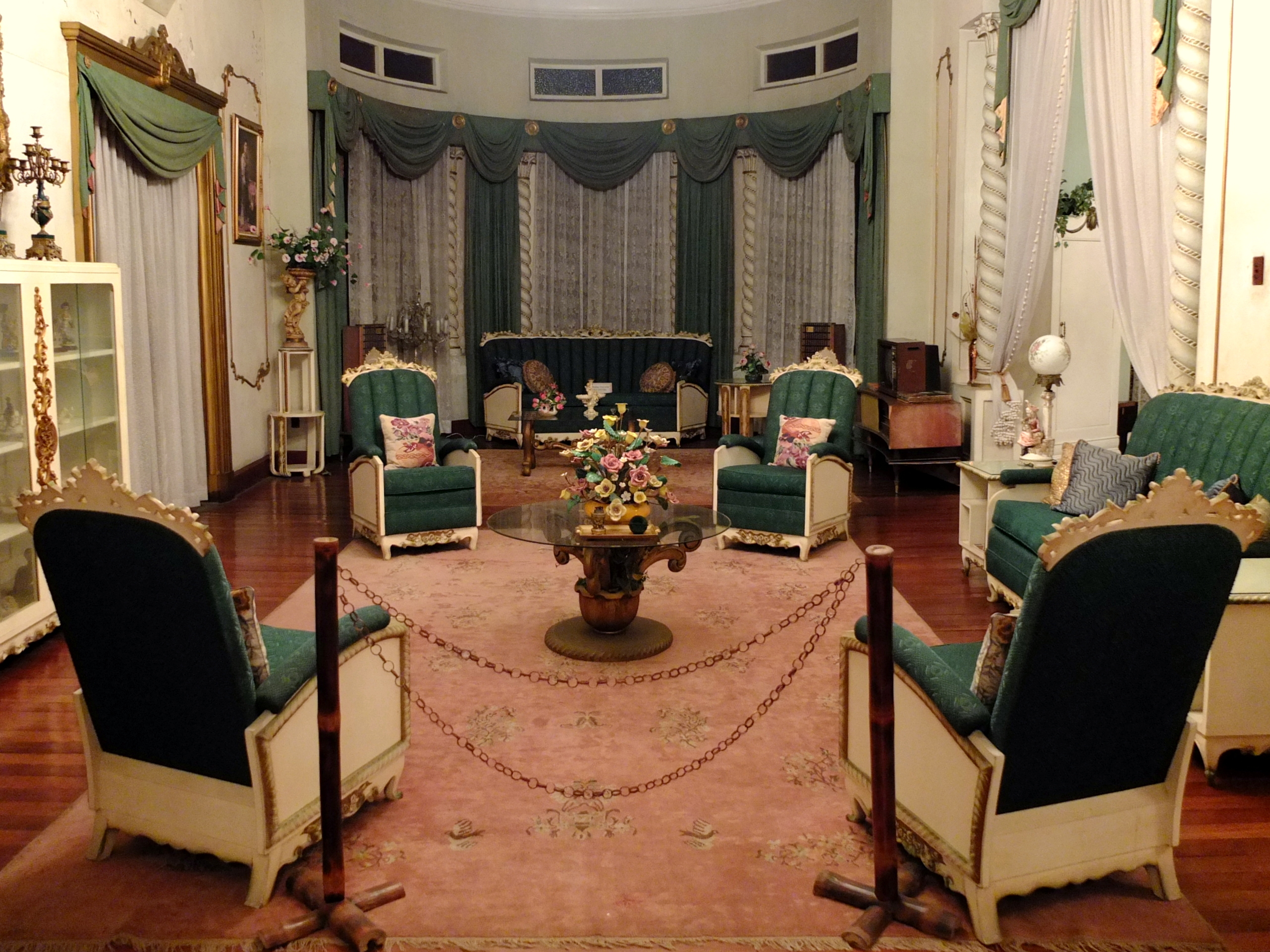
Second floor

On the second floor is the second receiving area which is as elegant as the first one, meticulously furnished with pieces of furniture and textiles in green hues. The set up is completed with wide opening windows, stained glass clerestory windows, large chandeliers, French provincial style furniture and long curtains that extend from floor to ceiling. The second dining area is also located at the second floor of the house. From the receiving area, a wide door opens to the front porch where the family stays for coffee to relax and have a view of the town.

The girls' bedroom and master's bedroom are also located on this floor. The house also features a small prayer room which is typical in most ancestral houses in the Philippines.

The bathrooms still has its original and working plumbing fixtures from the 1930s.

== Gallery ==
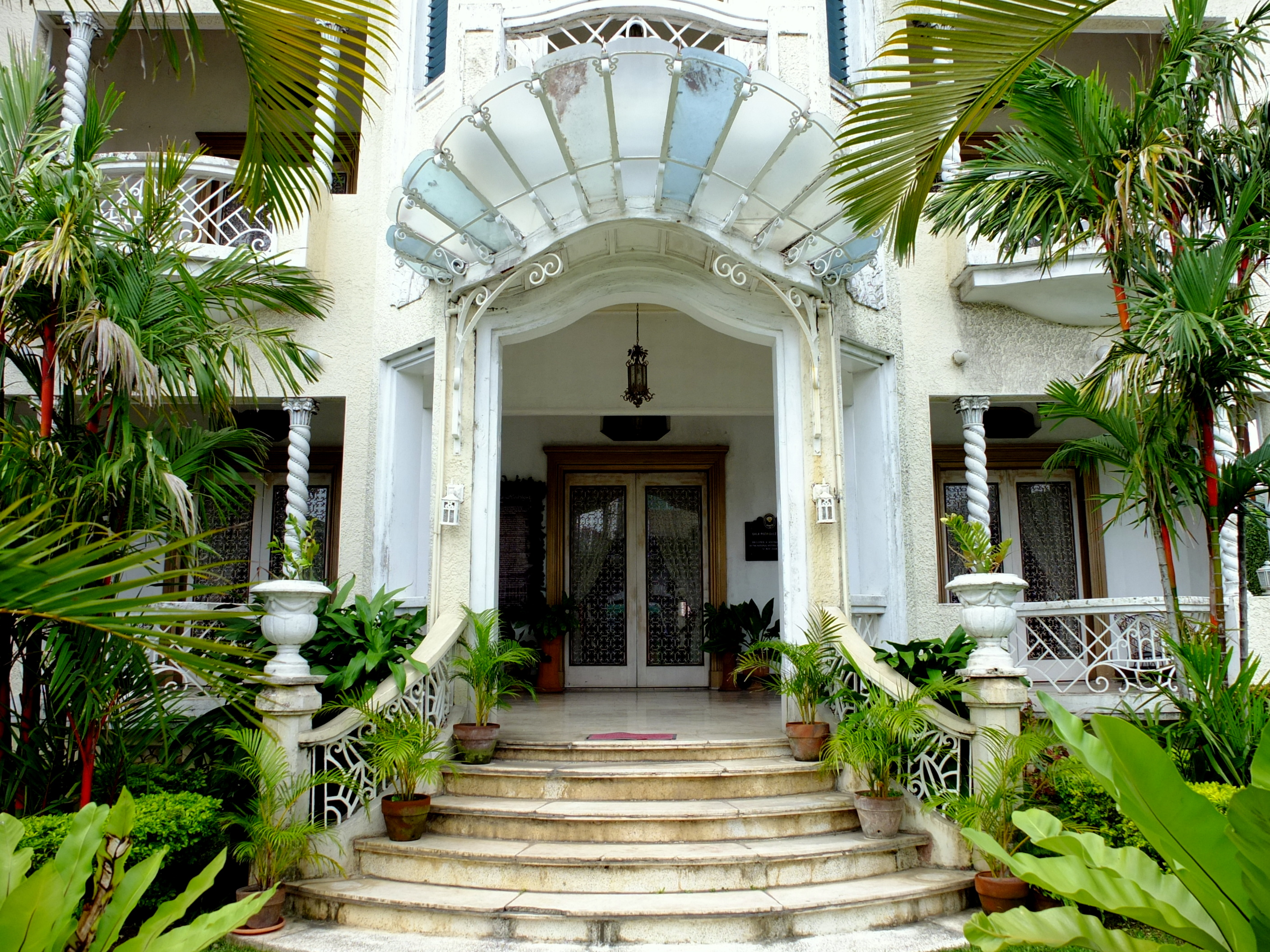
Entrance

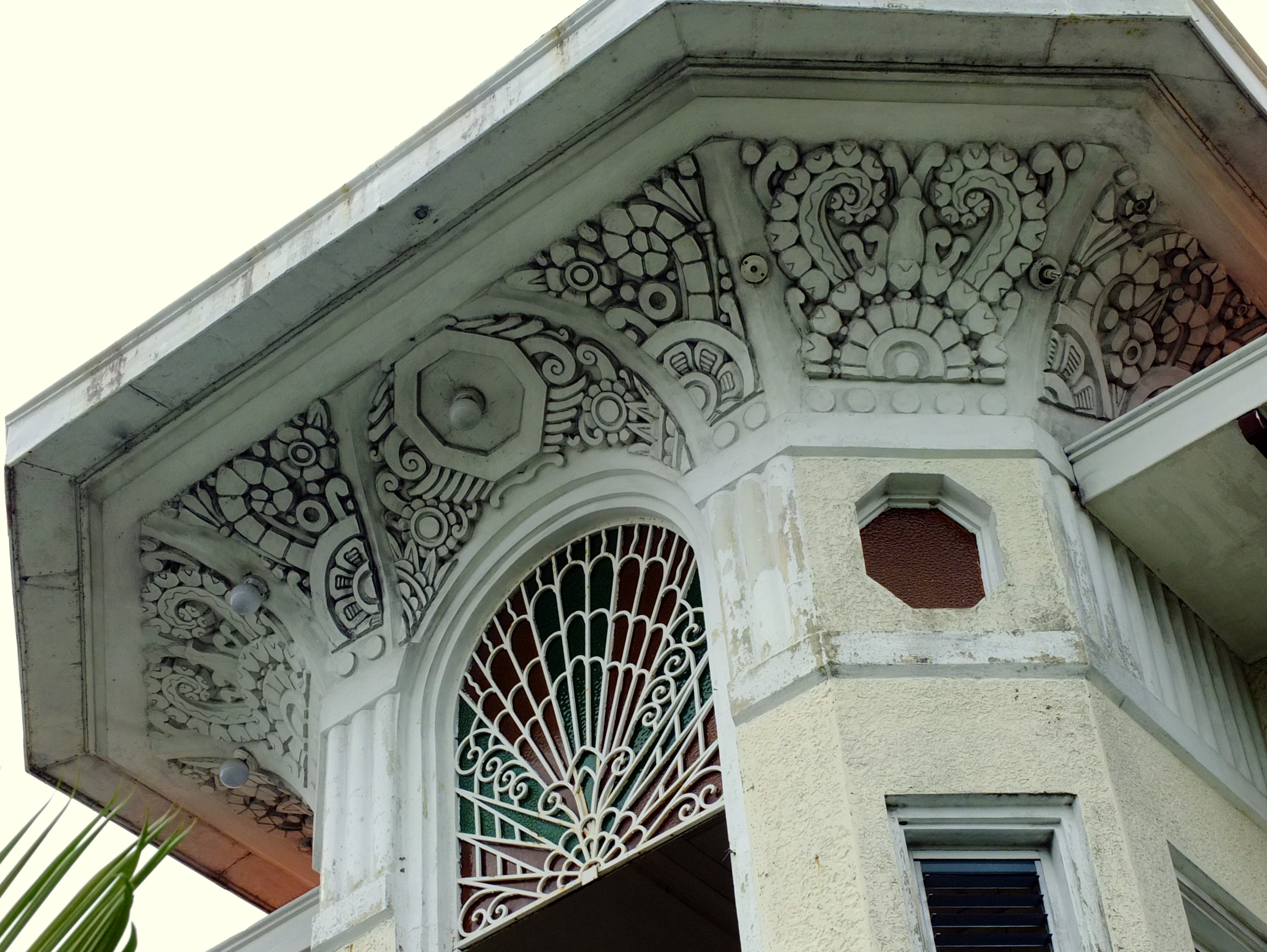
Art deco detail

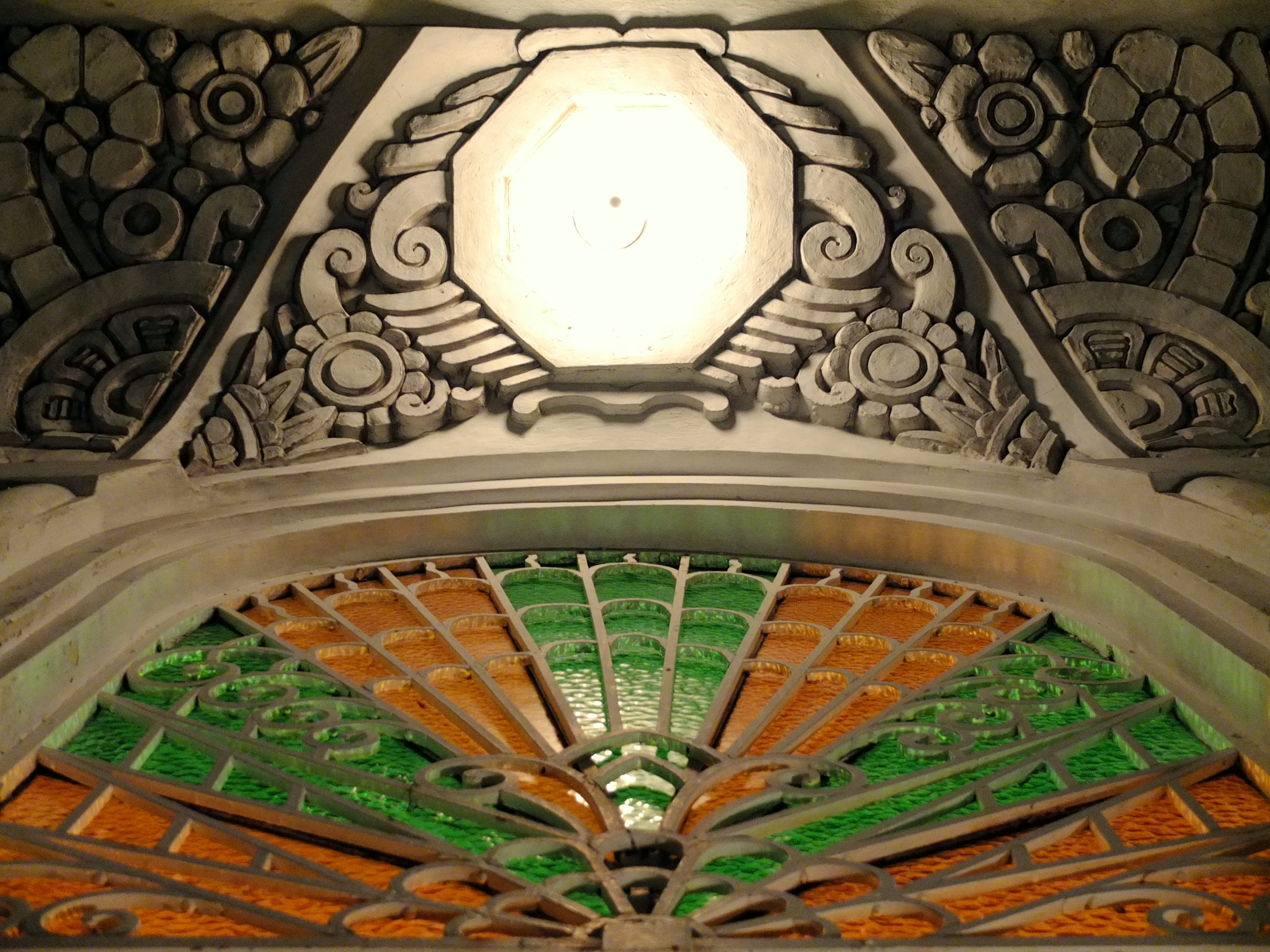
Gala close up facade

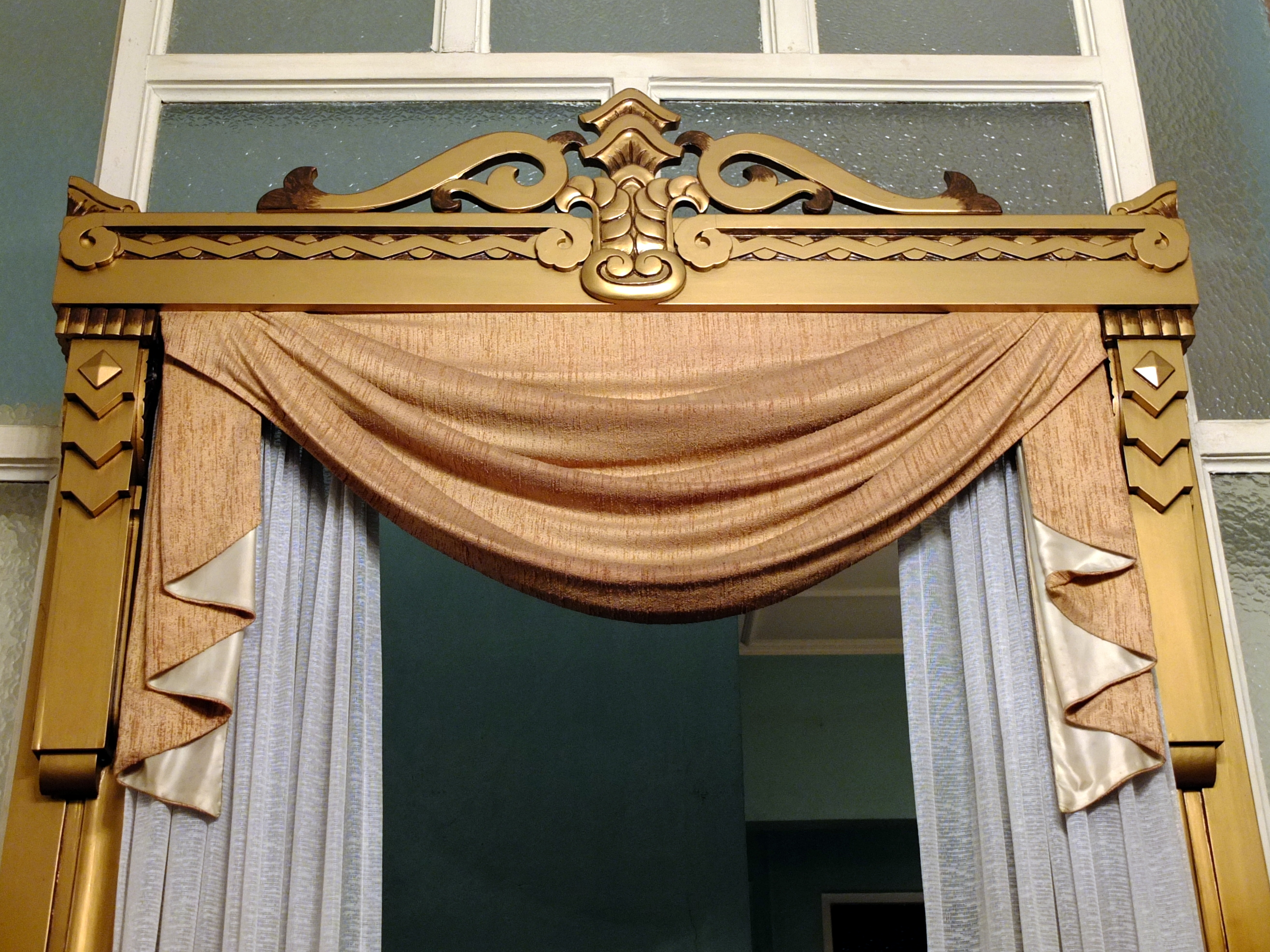
Art deco detail

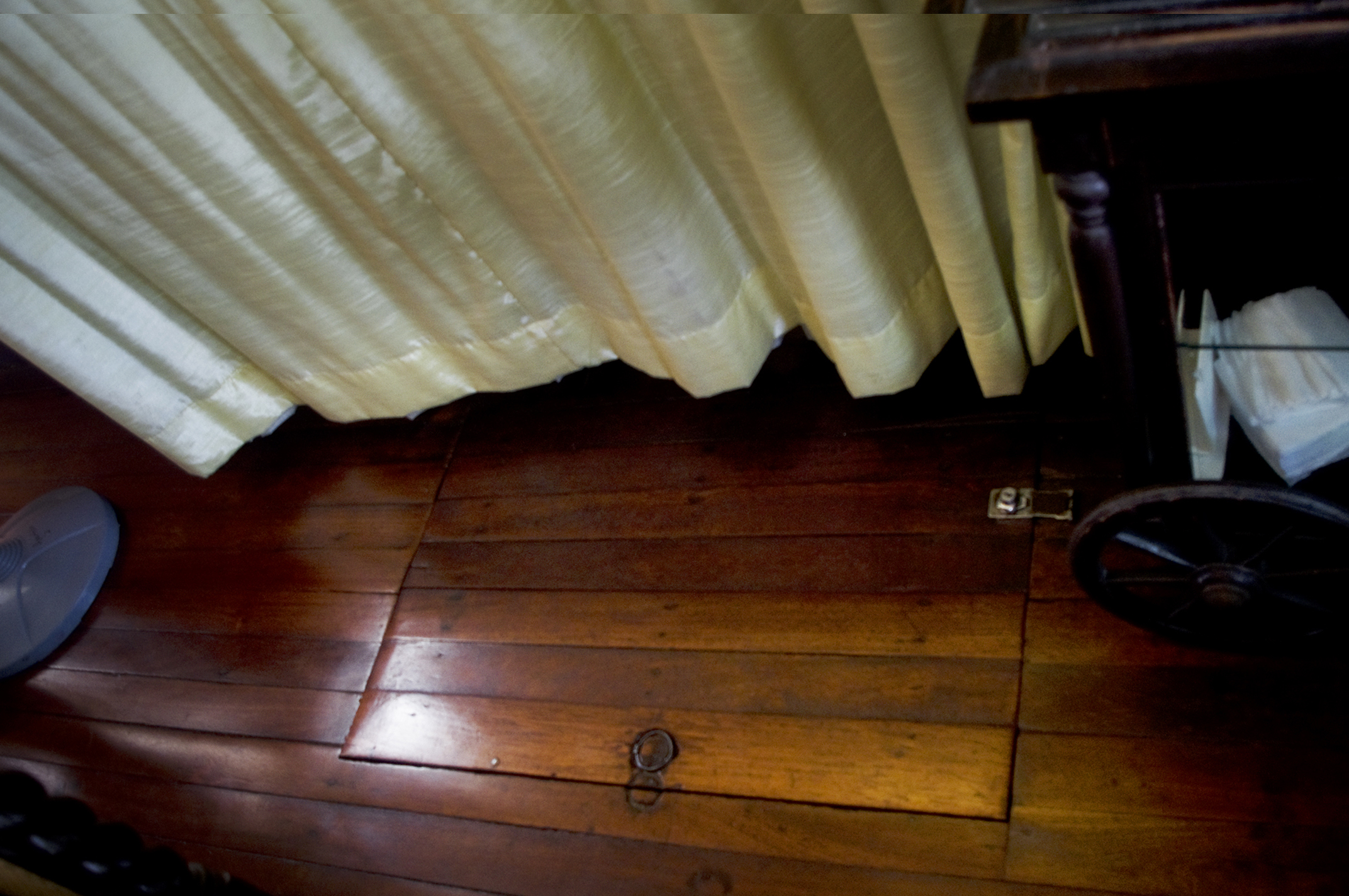
The secret door leading to the house cellar

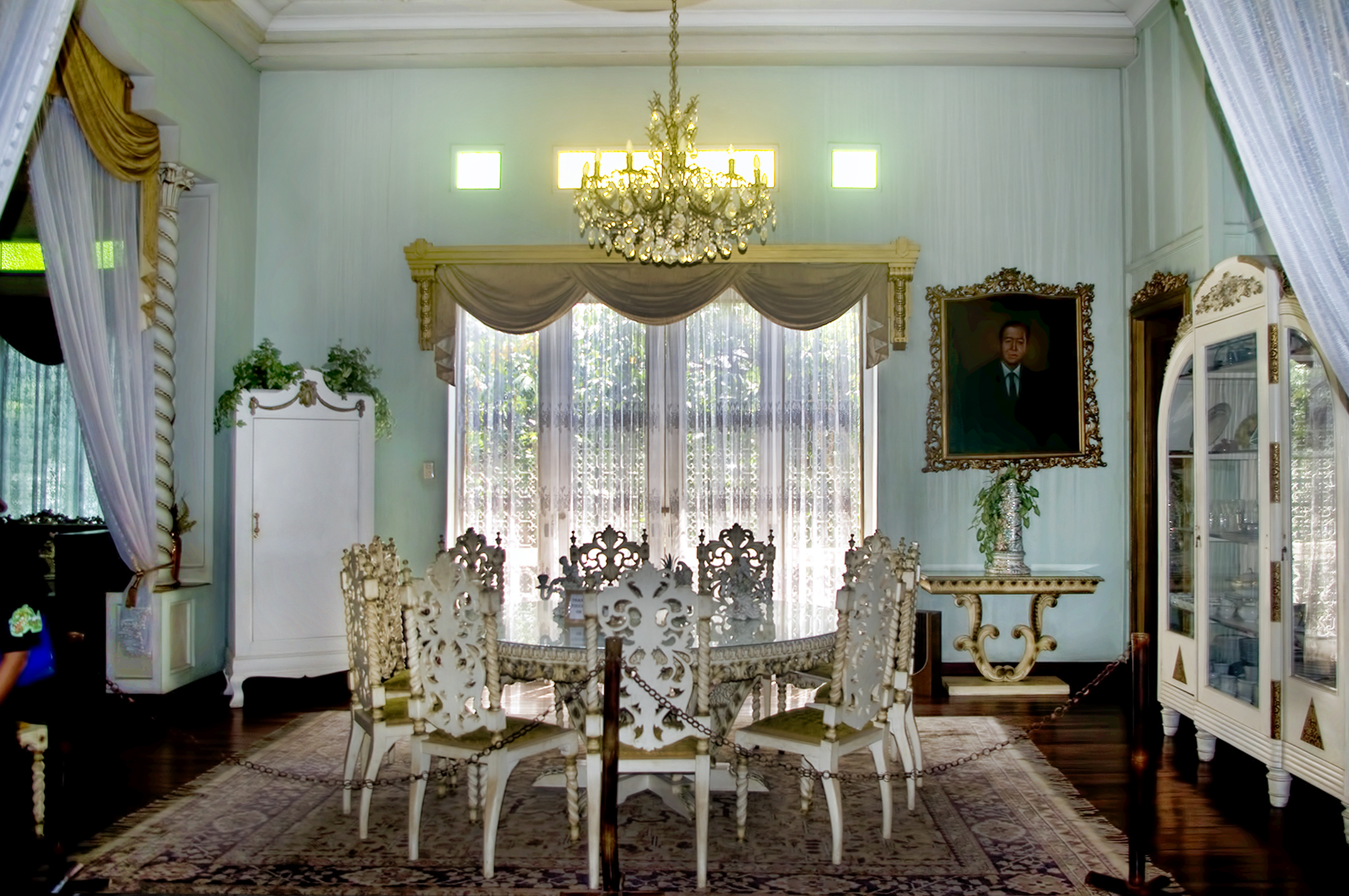
Dining area 2nd floor

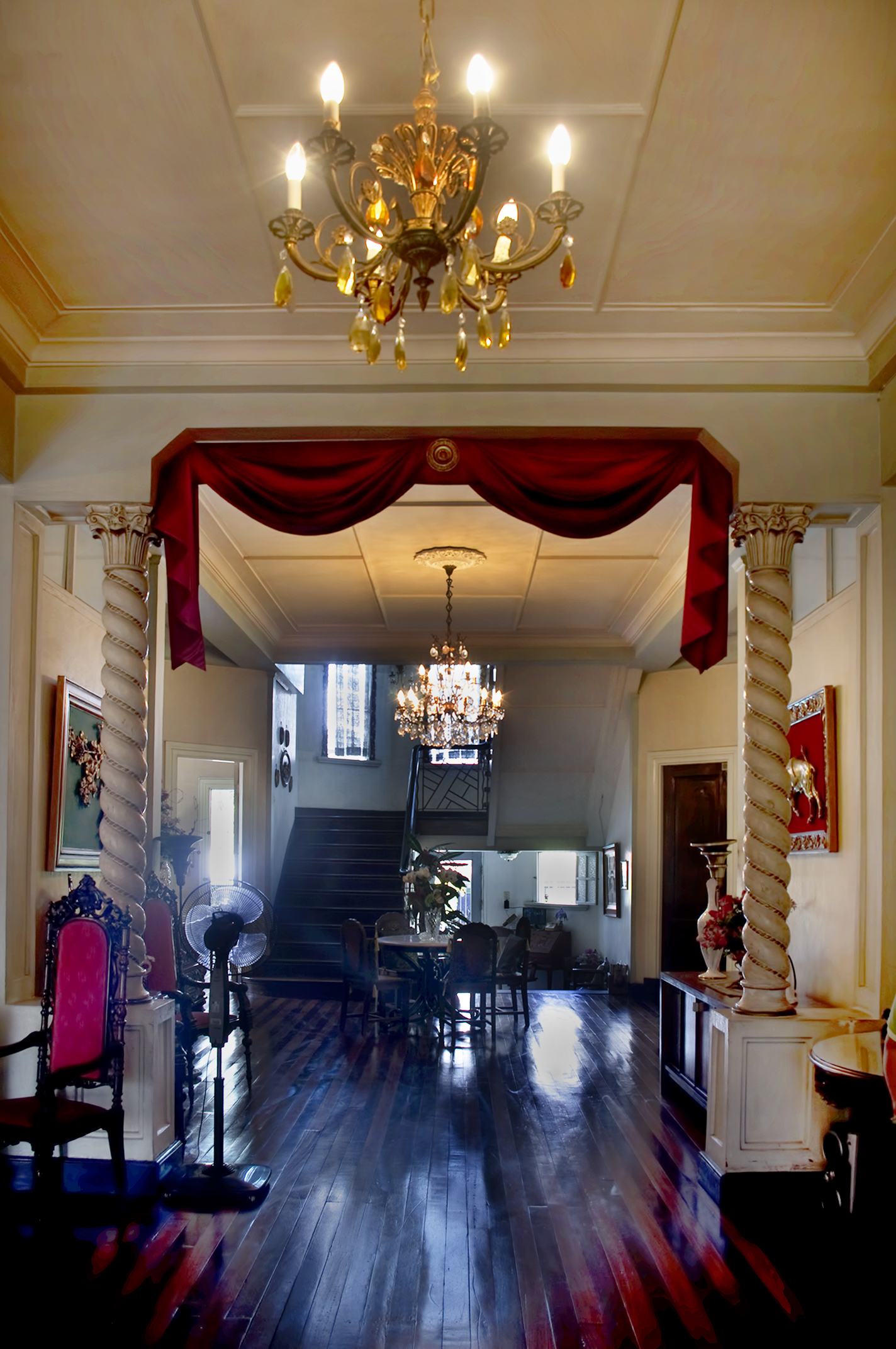
Stairs

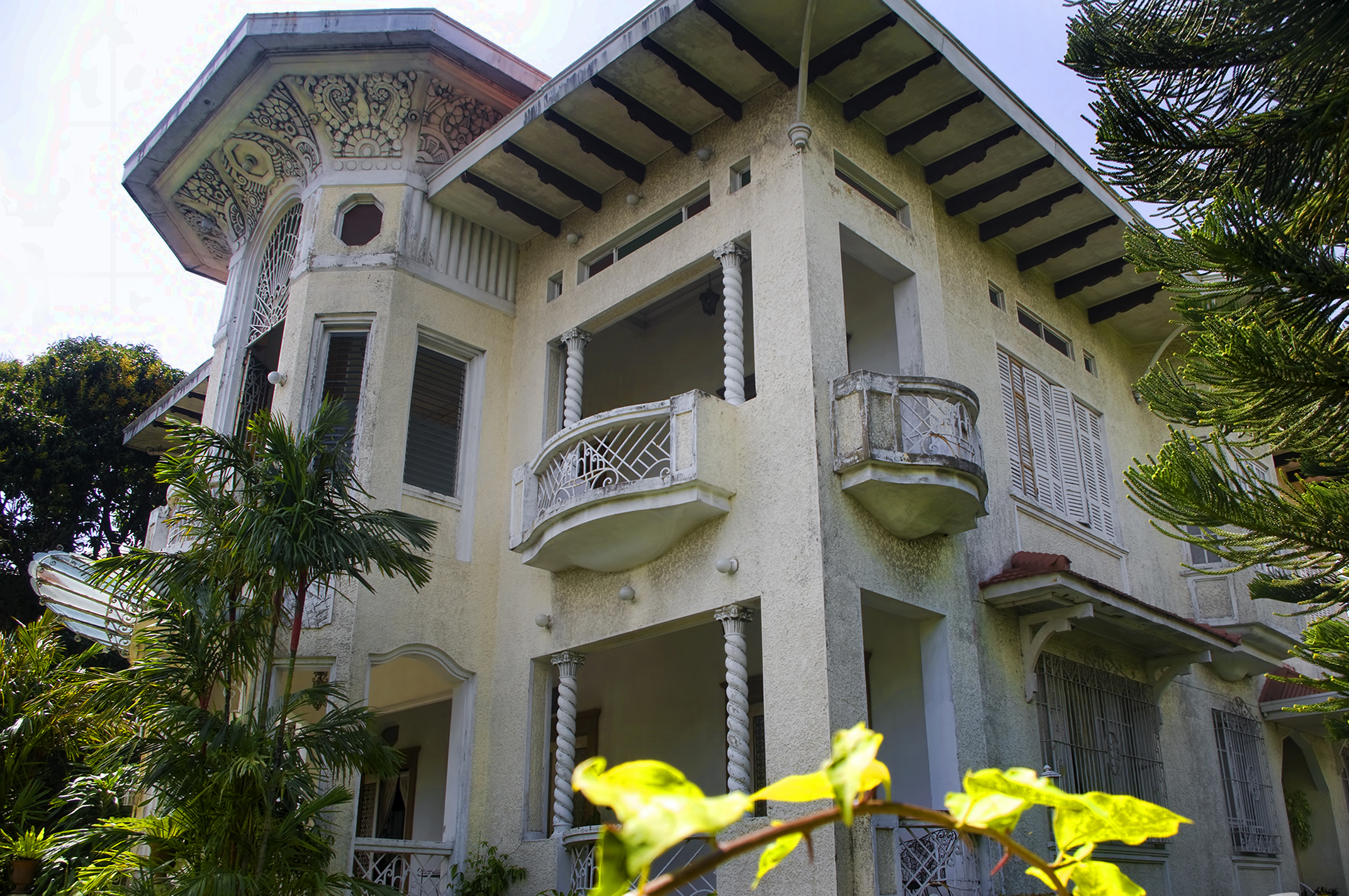
House

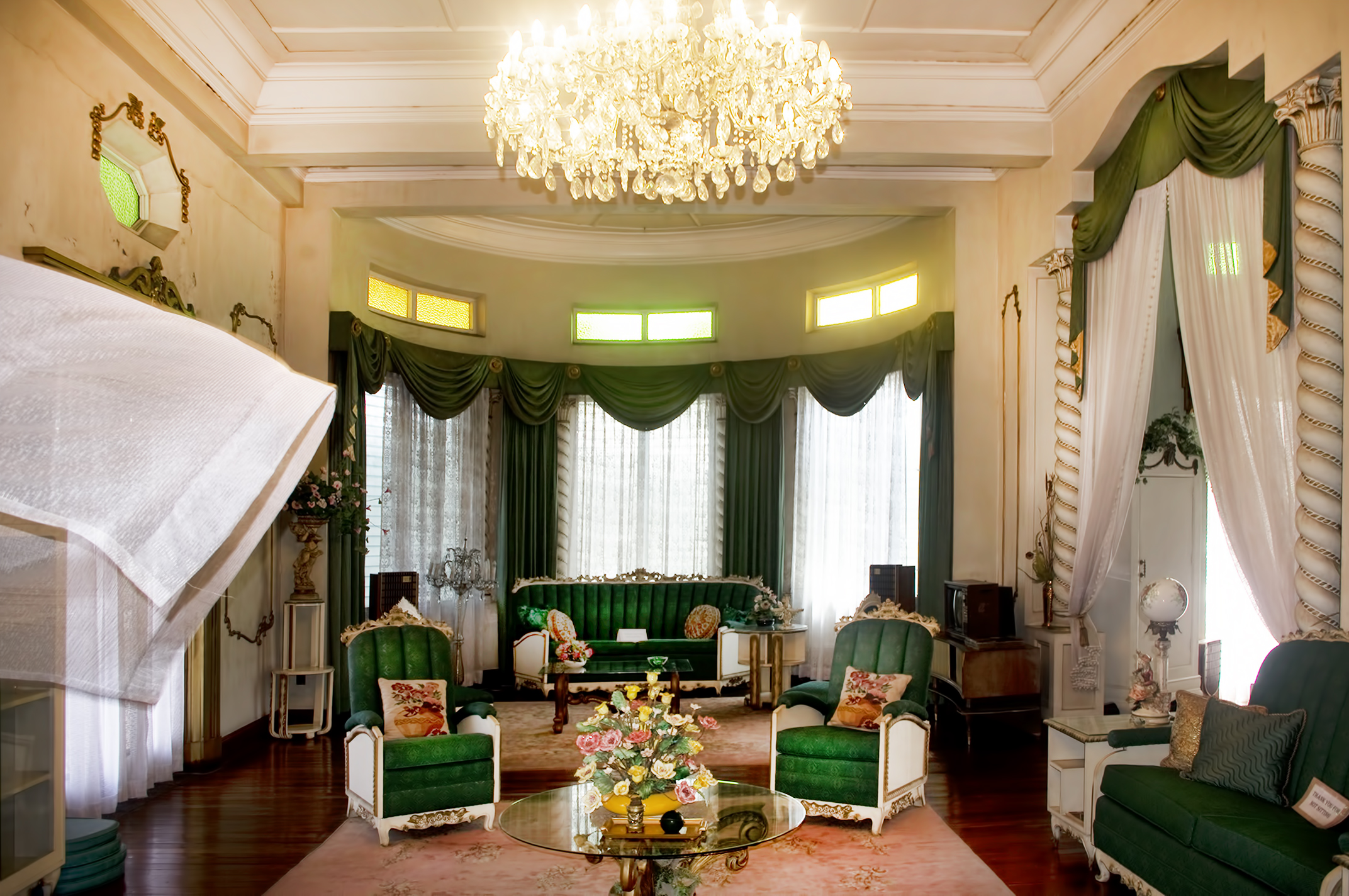
House 2nd floor living area
