= Anastazia Wambura =

Tanzanian politician

Honourable Anastazia Wambura MP

Deputy Minister of Information, Culture, Artists and Sports
- Incumbent
- Assumed office December 2015
- President: John Magufuli
- Minister: Nape Nnauye

Member of Parliament
- Incumbent
- Assumed office 2005
- Constituency: Special Seats

Personal details
- Born: 15 January 1965 (age 61)
- Party: CCM

Anastazia Wambura (born 15 January 1965) is a Tanzanian politician belonging to the ruling Chama Cha Mapinduzi (CCM) party. She is the current Deputy Minister of Information, Culture, Artists and Sports. She is a three-term Member of Parliament having been appointed to a special seat reserved for women.

== Background and education ==
Wambura was born on January 15, 1965. She completed her schooling from the Rugambwa Secondary School in 1986. In 1991, she received her bachelor's degree in home economics and human nutrition from the Sokoine University of Agriculture. She worked for the Catholic church for a number of years after as a teacher and a project coordinator. She then went back to Sokoine University of Agriculture for her master's degree in management of natural resources, which she completed in 2004.

== Political career ==
Wambura became involved with CCM in 2005 and has served in a number of party roles including as a member of the national general meeting. She was appointed to a seat in the Tanzanian Parliament in 2005 to a seat reserved for women. She has been reappointed a further two times in 2010 and 2015. In Parliament, she served as a member of Natural Resources and Environment committee between 2006 and 2010, Foreign Affairs, Defence and Security Committee between 2011 and 2013, and Foreign Affairs and International Cooperation Committee

Wambura was appointed Deputy Minister in the Ministry for Information, Culture, Arts and Sports in the newly elected President John Magufuli's government after the 2015 elections. She serves under cabinet Minister Nape Nnauye.
