= Murder of Anastasiya Meshcheryakova =

Murder case

Anastasiya Meshcheryakova (Russian: Анастасия Мещерякова, 16 August 2011 – 29 February 2016) was a 4-year old Russian girl who was killed on 29 February 2016 in Moscow by her Uzbek nanny, Gulchehra Boboqulova, who had been looking after her for three years.

== Life ==
Anastasiya had birth trauma that affected her central nervous system, and doctors predicted that she would not be able to walk without external help. In 2012, she was diagnosed with symptomatic multifocal epilepsy, motor disorders (including central tetraparesis), and impaired mental function.

Her parents were Yekaterina Aleksandrovna Meshcheryakova (Russian: Екатерина Александровна Мещерякова) and Vladimir Anatolievich Meshcheryakov (Russian: Владимир Анатольевич Мещеряков). Vladimir was from Oryol Oblast, but the family came to Moscow for work: Vladimir was a programmer in a federal ministry, and Yekaterina was an accountant for a private company. They spent large amounts of money to try to cure their child, including flying her to China for treatment. Before her death, they had planned to take her to Germany for surgery.

=== Murder ===
On the morning of 29 February 2016, Boboqulova waited until the girl’s parents and their elder child had left their rented flat in Moscow. Then she strangled Anastasiya, cut her head off with a knife, put the head in a bag, set fire to the flat, and left the house with the severed head.

At 9:30 a.m., local firefighters received a report of a fire in the flat. They arrived at 9:38, and by 10:05 a.m., the fire was extinguished. The flat was almost completely burned.

Meanwhile, Boboqulova took a taxi to the Oktyabrskoye Pole metro station, where she laid a prayer rug on the ground, knelt, and began to pray. Shortly thereafter, police officers asked her for her documents. Instead, Boboqulova showed them Anastasiya's head and told them that she had killed the child and was now going to blow herself up. She identified herself as a terrorist, claimed that she hated democracy, and shouted "Allahu akbar".

The policemen closed one exit of the metro station, evacuated visitors from nearby shops, and cordoned off the streets around the station. Boboqulova was arrested at 12:40 p.m., 40 minutes after the officers had asked for her documents.

== Covering up the crime on the Russian TV ==
The three largest TV channels — Channel One Russia, Russia-1 and NTV and smaller Russia-24, Petersburg – Channel 5, Public Television of Russia, TV Tsentr and Moscow 24 did not broadcast information about the murder. At the same time, the crime of the murder was actively covered on LifeNews, RBC Information Systems and Mir. Two issues of the news about this event made the TV channel Zvezda, and one issue – the REN TV channel. TV channels that did not broadcast news about the murder, published information about the murder on their websites. Spokesman of the Russian president, Dmitry Peskov, in this regard said that the Kremlin did not give instructions for silencing the murder and that TV channels independently decided to keep silent about this murder. However, the TV channels themselves refused to answer the question as to why they did not publish information about the murder on the day of the crime.

In connection with this Anti-corruption Foundation applied to the Investigative Committee of Russia to conduct a review and to initiate a criminal case under article 144 of the Criminal Code of the Russian Federation on the obstruction of the lawful professional activities of journalists.

=== Memorials ===
On 1 March 2016, a demonstration was held near the Oktyabrskoye Pole metro station in memory of Anastasiya, and in support of her family. Two spontaneous memorials went up, one near the metro station and the other outside the family's building. People brought flowers, plush toys, chocolates, and candles. Crowdfunding efforts on social networks collected more than 4 million rubles to help her family.

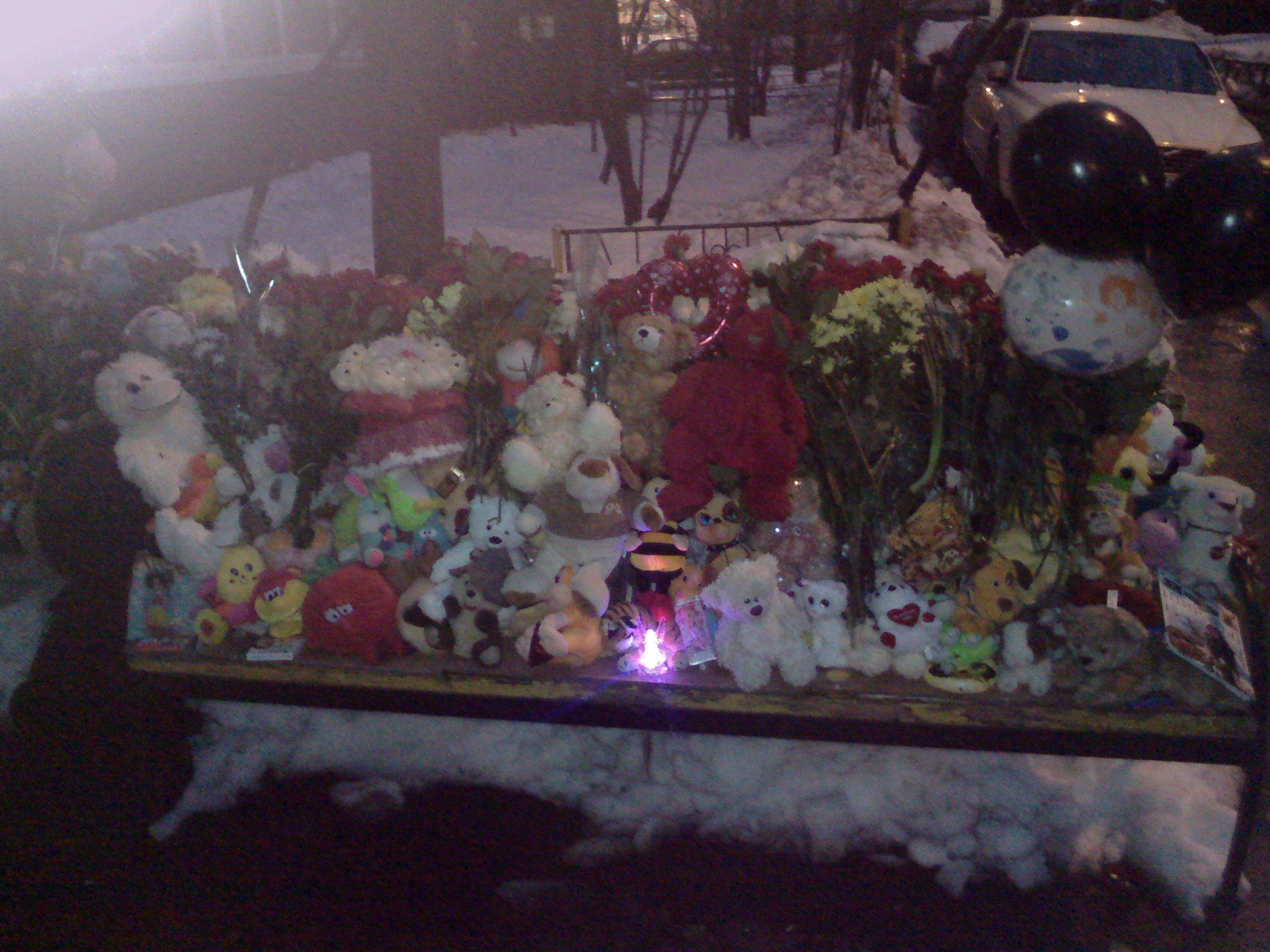
Memorial near the family's home

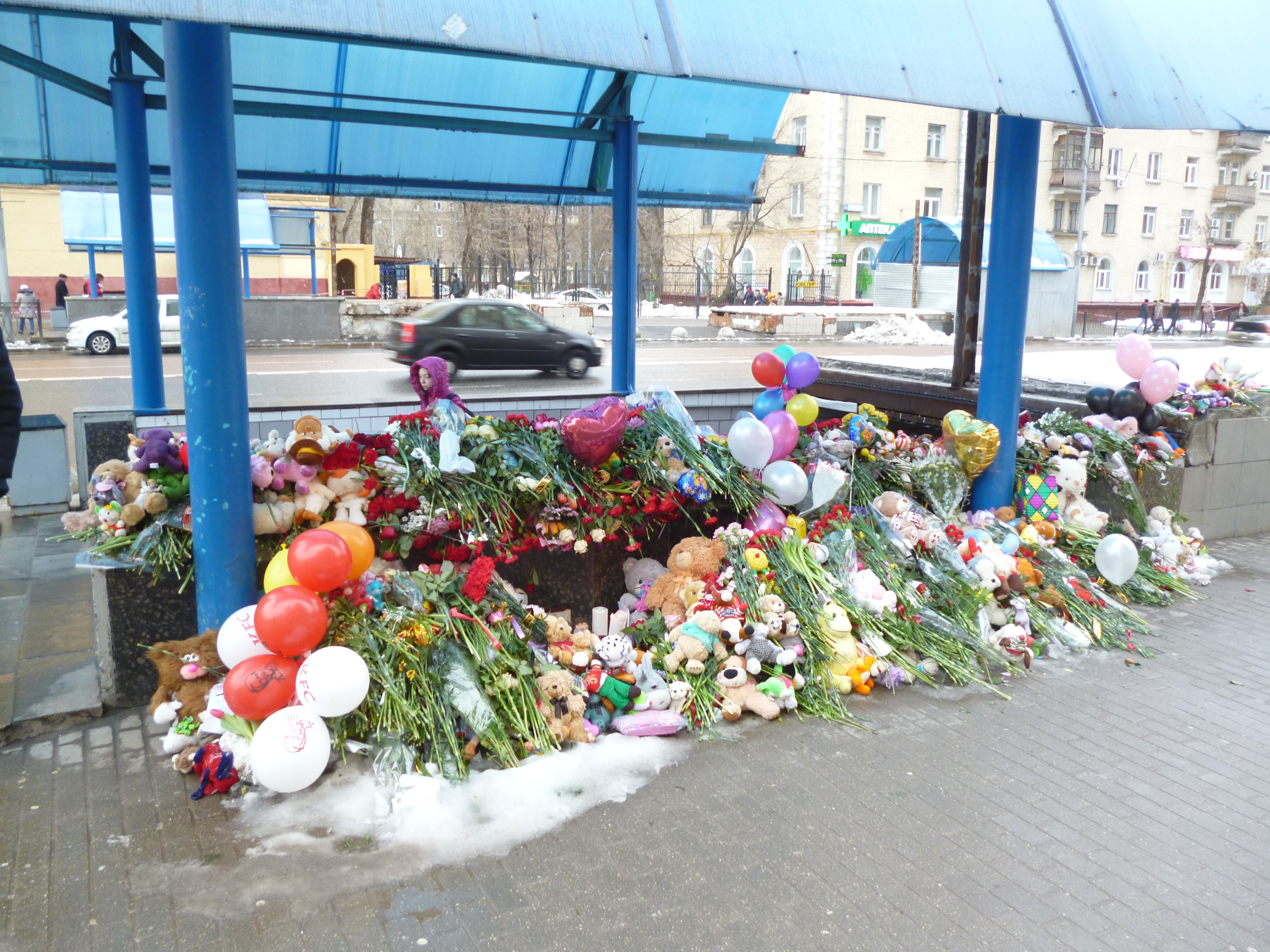
Memorial by the Oktyabrskoye Pole station

On 6 March, Anastasiya was buried in Livny, in Oryol Oblast, her father's homeland.

== Gulchehra Boboqulova ==
Boboqulova is one of six daughters of Bakhretdin Turayev (Uzbek: Бахретдин Тураев). Her first husband, Radmir, with whom she had three sons, left her in 2000; they formally divorced in 2002. In Moscow, she met her second husband, Sohrob Muminov, a native of Samarkand, Uzbekistan, who worked as a salesman. According to Boboqulova's father, the couple married in Samarkand and lived together for a little more than two years before Boboqulova discovered that he was unfaithful and they divorced.

Before working for the Meshcheryakova family, Boboqulova worked as a nanny for another family in Moscow, and she went to the Meshcheryakovas with a good recommendation. She was Anastasiya's nanny for three years before murdering her.

In March 2014, Boboqulova married Mamour Dzhurakulov (Tajik: Мамур Джуракулов), a Tajik. At the end of 2015, she flew home to Uzbekistan to renew her passport. There, she learned that her husband had married a second wife. After returning to Moscow in January 2016, she registered with the Federal Migration Service but did not receive a work permit.

After the murder, newspapers reported that Boboqulova was mentally ill. Moskovskij Komsomolets, Gazeta.ru, and RIA Novosti all reported—citing conversations with relatives, villagers, and various officials—that she had been diagnosed with schizophrenia and treated in a mental hospital in Uzbekistan in the early 2000s. However, at a court hearing, investigators did not provide any evidence of mental illness.

== Investigation ==
At the request of the Investigative Committee of Russia, officials at Uzbekistan's Ministry of Internal Affairs questioned Boboqulova's relatives, including her eldest son, Rahmatillo Ashurov. According to Ashurov, after Boboqulova married Dzhurakulov, she urged his son to move to Syria to become a soldier of the Islamic State (ISIS). Dzhurakulov was arrested in Tajikistan.

Before her first court hearing, Boboqulova said that Allah had ordered her to kill Anastasiya. Later in the interrogation, she said she had killed the girl as revenge against the Russian president, Vladimir Putin, for intervening in the Syrian Civil War.

On 4 March 2016, Boboqulova was formally charged with murder under Part 2 of Article 105 of the Criminal Code of Russia (murder of an infant). That month, she underwent psychiatric examinations at the Serbsky Center. On 10 March, she was transferred to the psychiatric hospital at the Butyrka prison for 30 days.

== Bibliography ==
- Nülifer Çembertas (1 April 2016). "Moskova'da Kesik Baş Cinayeti: "Bunnu yapmami Allah emretti"". Ateist dergi (in Turkish) (12 ed.). p. 26.
