= Anastasiya Boroda =

Kazakhstani water polo player

Personal information
- Nationality: Kazakhstani
- Born: 2 January 1976 (age 50) Zhambyl, Kazakh SSR, Soviet Union

Sport
- Sport: Water polo

Anastasiya Boroda (Анастасия Владимировна Борода-Дурочкина, born 2 January 1976) is a Kazakhstani water polo player. She competed in the women's tournament at the 2000 Summer Olympics.
