= Anastasiia Liashenko =

Ukrainian politician

- Анастасія Ляшенко
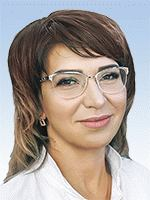
- Official portrait, 2019

People's Deputy of Ukraine
- Incumbent
- Assumed office 29 August 2019
- Preceded by: Kostiantyn Ishcheikin
- Constituency: Poltava Oblast, No. 148

Personal details
- Born: 7 November 1986 (age 39) Ternivshchyna, Ukrainian SSR, Soviet Union (now Ukraine)
- Party: Servant of the People
- Other political affiliations: Independent
- Education: Poltava V.G. Korolenko National Pedagogical University

Anastasiia Oleksiivna Liashenko (Ukrainian: Анастасія Олексіївна Ляшенко; born 7 November 1986) is a Ukrainian politician currently serving as a People's Deputy of Ukraine from Ukraine's 148th electoral district, located in Poltava Oblast, since 2019. She represents the Servant of the People party. Prior to her election, she was a journalist.

== Early life and career ==
Anastasiia Oleksiivna Liashenko was born on 7 November 1986 in the village of Ternivshchyna, Lubny Raion, Poltava Oblast, in what was then the Ukrainian Soviet Socialist Republic. She studied at the Poltava V.G. Korolenko National Pedagogical University from 2005 to 2011, graduating with a specialty in Ukrainian language and literature. Liashenko became a member of the National Union of Journalists of Ukraine in 2010.

Liashenko was a correspondent for Radio Lubny from 2008 to 2009, and from 2011 to 2014 she worked for Lubenshchyna, a Lubny-based newspaper, as the paper's youth and culture correspondent. After leaving Lubenshchyna, Liashenko founded her own magazine, named Our Common Cause, in 2015. She also served as chief editor of the magazine.

== Political career ==
Liashenko was the candidate of the Servant of the People party in the 148th electoral district, which includes Lubny, during the 2019 Ukrainian parliamentary election. At the time of the election, she was an independent. She was successfully elected, defeating independent candidate Fahraddin Mukhtarov with 25.8% of the vote to Mukhtarov's 21.3%.

=== People's Deputy of Ukraine ===
In the Verkhovna Rada (Ukrainian parliament), Liashchenko joined the Finance, Tax, and Customs Committee, as well as Humane Country, a non-partisan committee focused on animal rights. Within Servant of the People's parliamentary faction, she is part of the informal Kolomoiskyi Group, comprising deputies connected to oligarch Ihor Kolomoiskyi.

Liashenko voted against an October 2019 bill to prosecute individuals involved in a real estate corruption scandal, sparking criticism from transparency non-governmental organisation Chesno.
