= Anastasiia Gavrylchenko =

Ukrainian athlete

- Анастасія Гаврильченко
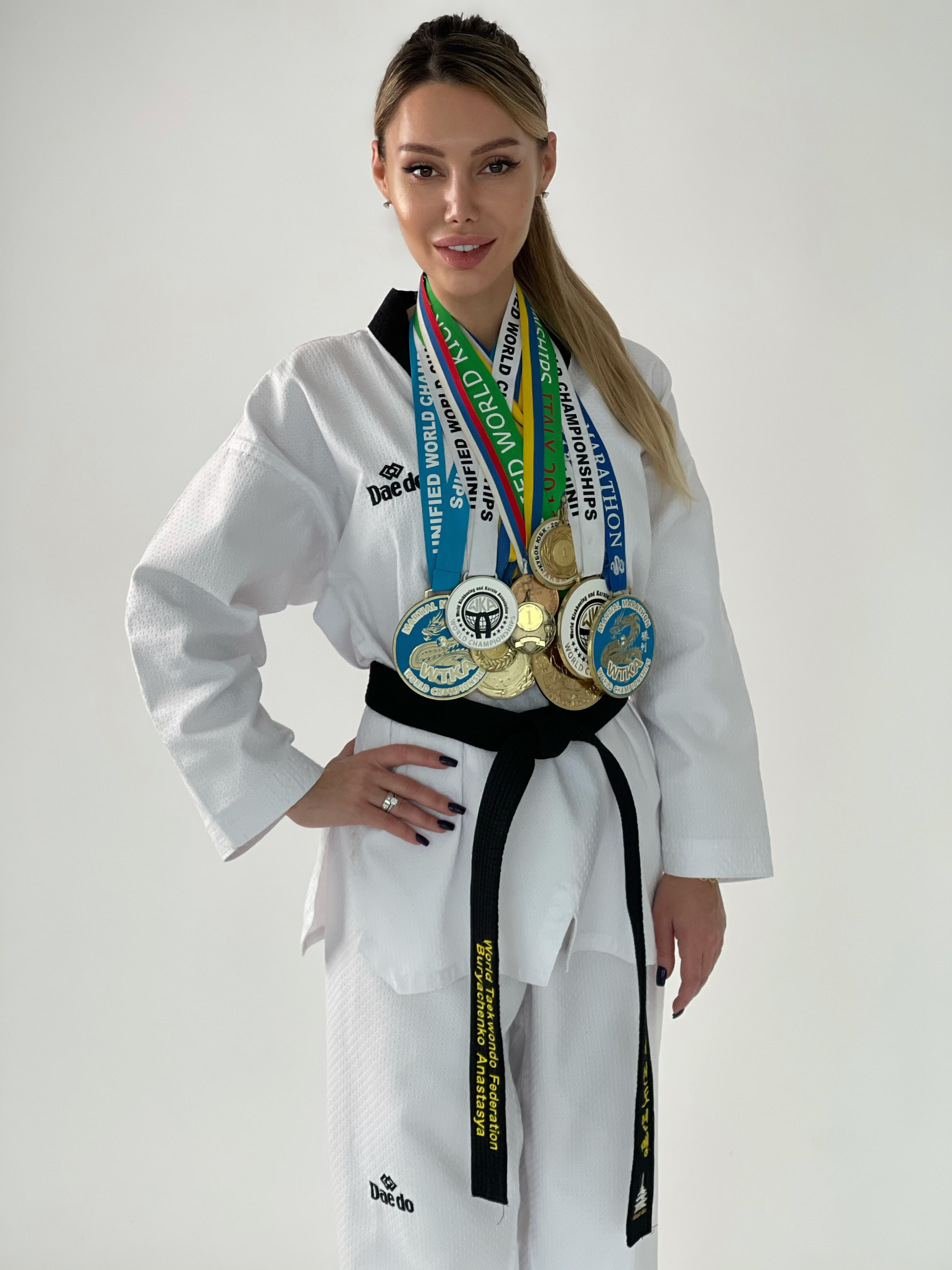
- Born: July 4, 1989 (age 37); Novomoskovsk, Ukraine
- Education: University of Customs and Finance (Dnipro, Ukraine)
- Occupation: sports
- Known for: Master of Sports of International Class in military and sports all-round competition (MSAC); Master of Sports of Ukraine in Taekwondo; 1st Dan black belt in Taekwondo WTF
- Awards: Five-time champion of Ukraine in taekwondo Silver medalist of the World Championship in military and sports all-round competition (MSAC)

Anastasiia Gavrylchenko (Ukrainian: Анастасія Гаврильченко; born July 4, 1989, Ukraine) is a Ukrainian athlete, five-time champion of Ukraine in taekwondo, silver medalist of the seventh World Championship in military and sports all-round competition (MSAC), captain of the Customs Service of Ukraine, blogger.

== Biography ==
Anastasiia Gavrylchenko was born on July 4, 1989, in the city of Novomoskovsk, Dnipropetrovsk Oblast.

She has been practicing taekwondo since the age of 10. She holds the title of Master of Sports of International Class in military and sports all-round competition (MSAC) and Master of Sports of Ukraine in Taekwondo WTF.

In 2006–2011 she studied at the Academy of Customs Service of Ukraine (now the University of Customs and Finance) in Dnipro.

From 2011 to 2020 she worked as a senior state inspector of customs posts "Novomoskovsk" and "Airport" of the Dnipropetrovsk customs SFS. She has the rank of captain of the Customs Service of Ukraine.

== Sport achievements ==
2006 – the title of Master of Sports of Ukraine in Taekwondo.

2013 – Silver medalist of the seventh World Championship in military and sports all-round competition (MSAC). Master of Sports of Ukraine of international class in military and sports all-round competition.

Five-time champion of Ukraine in taekwondo (WTF). Winner of International Taekwondo Tournaments (WTF).
