= Anastasia =

- Pronunciation: English: /ˌænəˈsteɪʒə/, UK also /-ziə/ Greek: [anastaˈsi.a] Russian: [ɐnəstɐˈsʲijə] Ukrainian: [ɐnɐstɐˈs⁽ʲ⁾ijɐ]
- Gender: Female
- Language: Greek: Αναστασία; Russian: Анастасия; Ukrainian: Анастасія; Serbian Cyrillic: Анастасија; Bulgarian: Анастасия

Origin
- Meaning: "Resurrection"
- Region of origin: Greece

Other names
- Short forms: Asya, Anya, Nastya, Sia, Stacey, Stacie, Stacy, Stasia, Tasia, Tacy, Anna, Ann, Anne, Annie
- Related names: Anastacia, Annastasia, Anastasiya, Anastasya
- See also: Athanasia

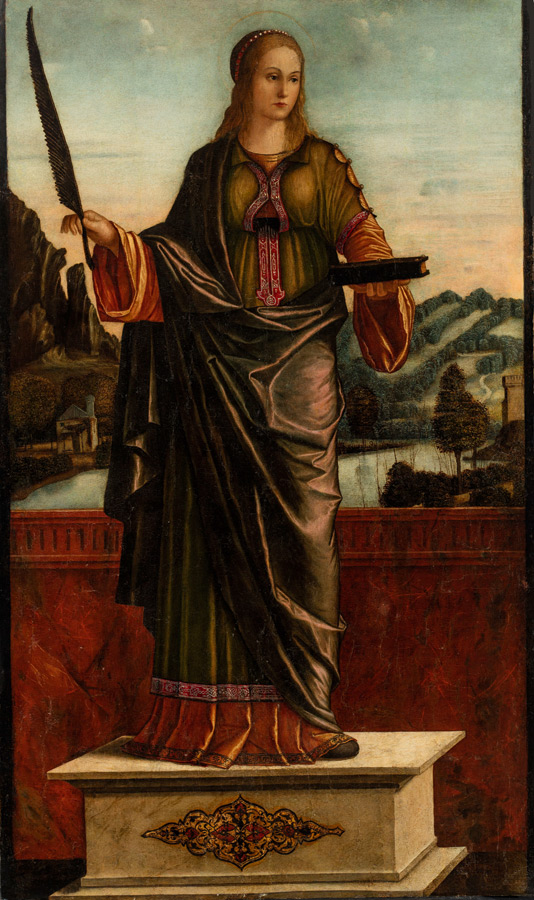
Anastasia, Saint in the Catholic Church (both the Latin Church and Eastern Catholic Churches), Eastern Orthodox Churches, and Oriental Orthodox Churches

Anastasia (from Greek: Ἀναστασία, romanized: Anastasía) is a feminine given name of Greek origin, it derives from the Greek word anástasis (ἀνάστασις), meaning "resurrection". It is a popular name in Eastern Europe.

== Origin ==
The name Anastasia originated during the early days of Christianity and was given to a few Greek girls and boys born in December and around Easter. It was established as the female form (Greek: Ἀναστασία) of the male name Anastasius (Greek: Ἀναστάσιος Anastasios pronounced [anaˈstasi.os]), and has the meaning of "she/he of the resurrection". It is the name of several early saints; including Anastasia of Sirmium, a central saint from the 3rd century who is commemorated during the first Mass on Christmas Dawn each year according to the traditional calendar of the Catholic Church and on December 22 according to the Eastern Orthodox Church. Slavic diminutives include Nastya, Nastia or Nastja (Serbian, Slovenian) as well as various hypocoristics: Nastenka, Nastyusha, Nastyona, Nastasia, Nastunja.

== Popularity ==
Anastasia is a very popular name for girls, especially in Europe, where most names have Christian associations. Anastasia was the most popular name for girls for many years in Russia until 2008, when it was surpassed by the name Sophia. It remains one of the top ten names for Russian girls, as well as for girls in Belarus, Moldova, Serbia, Georgia, and Montenegro.

== Translations and variants ==
Belarusian: Анастасія (Anastasija), Настасся (Nastassia), Насця (Nascia), Наська (Naśka), Ася (Asia), Настачка (Nastačka)

Czech: Anastázie, Nastička, Anastázička, Nastička, Anuška

English: Anastasia, Sia, Stacey, Stacie, Stacy, Stasey, Stasie, Stasy, Tacy, Tacey, Tacie, Tasy, Tasey, Tasie, Stasia, Tasia, Ana, Anna, Annie, Anie, Ann, Anne, Asia

Greek: Αναστασία (Anastasía), Τασία (Tasia) Τασούλα (Tasoula), Σία (Sia), Νατάσα (Natasa)

Irish Gaelic: Annstás, Stéise

Polish: Anastazja, Nastazja, Nastunia, Nastusia, Nastuszka, Nastasia, Stasia, Nasia, Tasia, Nasteczka, Nastka, Anastazka, Ania, Anka

Russian: Анастасия (Anastasiya), Настя (Nastia), Настенька (Nastenka), Настюша (Nastyusha), Настена (Nastyona)

Slovak: Anastázia, Anastázka, Stázka, Nasťa, Stáza

Ukrainian: Настасія (Nastasiya), Анастасія (Anastasiya), Настя (Nastia), Наста (Nasta), Настинька (Nastynka)

== Given name ==
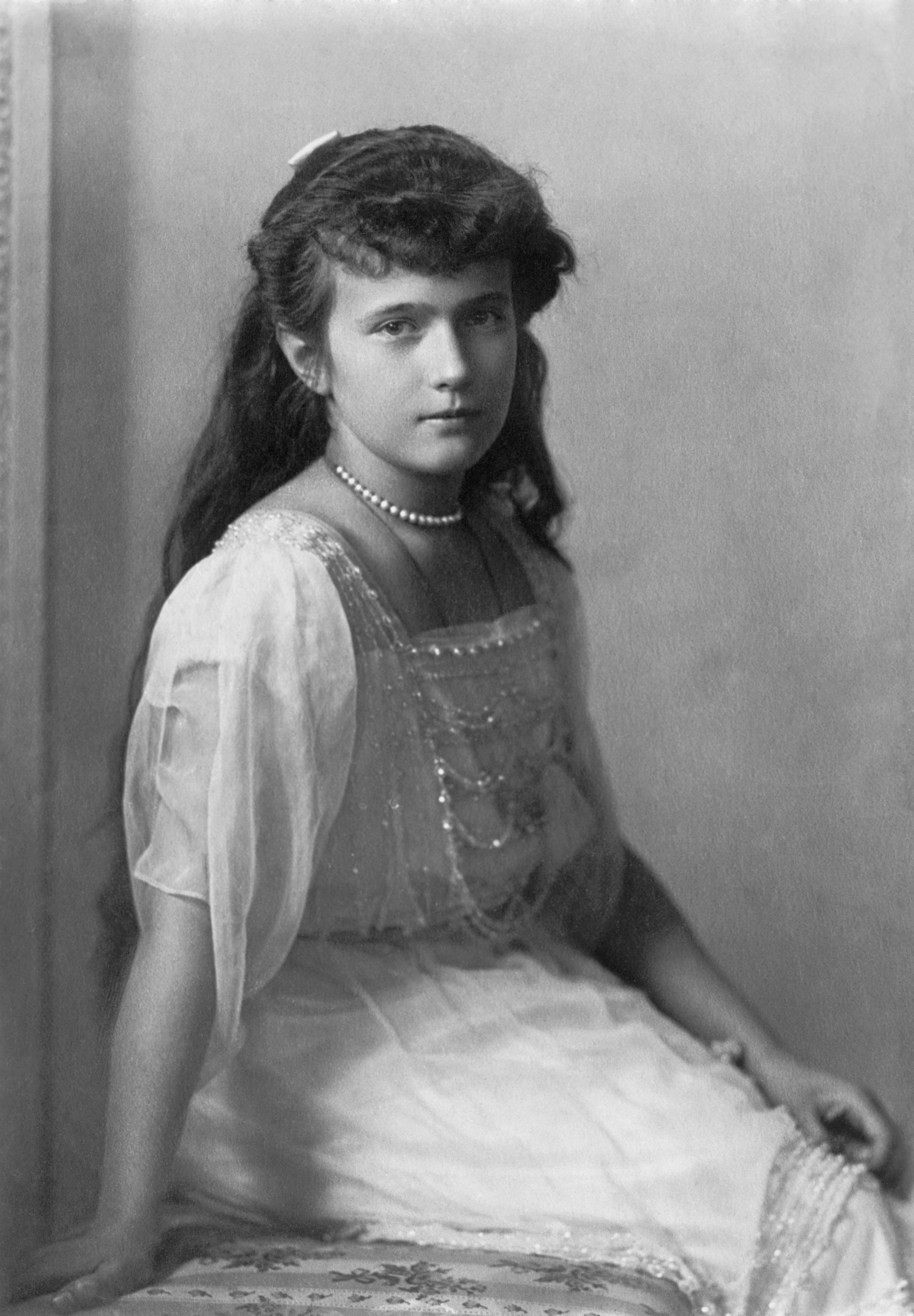
1914 photo of Grand Duchess Anastasia Nikolaevna of Russia, youngest daughter of Tsar Nicholas II, approximately age 13.

- Anastasia (sister of Constantine I) (c. 290 – after 314), half sister of Emperor Constantine I
- Anastasia (wife of Constantine IV) (c. 650 – after 711), Empress consort of Constantine IV of the Byzantine Empire
- Anastasia the Patrician ( fl. 576), Byzantine courtier and Christian saint
- Princess Anastasia of Greece and Denmark (1878–1923)
- Princess Anastasia of Montenegro (1868–1935)
- Anastasia of Kiev (c.1023–1074/1096), Queen consort of Hungary
- Anastasia of Sirmium (died 304 A.D.), Christian saint and martyr
- Anastasia, Princess of Löwenstein-Wertheim-Rosenberg (1944–2026)
- Anastasia Abbagnato (born 2003), Italian tennis player
- Anastasia Abramova (1902–1985), Russian ballerina
- Anastasia Abrosimova (born 1990), Russian triathlete
- Anastasia Acosta (born 1974), Mexican actress and model
- Anastasia Afanasieva (born 1982), Ukrainian physician
- Anastasia Agafonova (born 2003), Russian artistic gymnast
- Anastasia Ailamaki, Greek/Swiss computer scientist
- Anastasia Aksenova (born 1990), Russian swimmer
- Anastasia Anastasio (born 1990), Italian archer
- Anastasia Arkhipovskaya (born 1998), Russian synchronized swimmer
- Anastasia Ashley (born 1987), American professional surfer and model
- Anastasia Avdeeva (born 2001), Russian swimmer
- Anastasia Avramidou (born 2000), Greek chess master
- Anastasia Baburova (1983–2009), Ukrainian-born Russian journalist
- Anastasia Bachynska (born 2003), Ukrainian artistic gymnast
- Anastasia Baranova (born 1989), Russian actress
- Anastasia Bardina (born 1962), Russian musician
- Anastasia Baryshnikova (born 1990), Russian taekwondo practitioner
- Anastasia Barzee (born 1971), American actress and singer
- Anastasia Bavykina (born 1992), Russian volleyball player
- Anastasia Bayandina (born 1996), Russian synchronized swimmer
- Anastasia Belova (born 1981), Russian ice dancer
- Anastasia Belyakova (born 1993), Russian boxer
- Anastasia Bezrukova (born 2004), Russian model
- Anastasia Bitsenko (1875–1938), Russian revolutionary
- Anastasia Blayvas (born 2001), German freestyle wrestler
- Anastasia Bliznyuk (born 1994), Russian rhythmic gymnast
- Anastasia Bodnaruk (born 1992), Russian chess player
- Anastasia Bogdanovski (born 1993), Macedonian swimmer
- Anastasia Bolkvadze (born 2002), Georgian footballer
- Anastasia Bratchikova (born 1989), Russian freestyle wrestler
- Anastasia Brown, American music supervisor
- Anastasia Bryukhanova (born 1993), Russian politician
- Anastasia Bryzgalova (born 1992), Russian curler
- Anastasia Bucsis (born 1989), Canadian speed skater
- Anastasia Bukhanko (born 1990), Russian tennis player
- Anastasia van Burkalow (1911–2004), American geographer and hymnologist
- Anastasia Cannuscio (born 1992), American former competitive ice dancer
- Anastasia Carbonari (born 2003), Latvian racing cyclist
- Anastasia Chaun (born 1988), Russian swimmer
- Anastasia Chebotareva (born 1972), Ukrainian violinist
- Anastasia Chernaya (born 1987), Russian volleyball player
- Anastasia Chernova (born 1993), Miss Ukraine Universe
- Anastasia Chernyavsky, Russian-born photographer
- Anastasia Chirtsova (born 1990), Russian alpine skier
- Anastasia Chistyakova (born 1997), Russian ice hockey player
- Anastasia Chulkova (born 1985), Russian cyclist
- Anastasia Chursina (born 1995), Russian cyclist
- Anastasia Davydova (born 1983), Russian synchronized swimmer
- Anastasia Denisova (born 1993), Belarusian orienteering competitor
- Anastasia Dețiuc (born 1998), Czech-Moldovan tennis player
- Anastasia Dimitrova-Moser (born 1937), Bulgarian politician
- Anastasia Diodorova (born 1990), Russian Paralympic swimmer
- Anastasia Dmitrieva (born 1999), Russian artistic gymnast
- Anastasia Dmitruk (born 1991), Ukrainian poet
- Anastasia Dobrinina (born 1993), Russian badminton player
- Anastasia Dobromyslova (born 1984), Russian darts player
- Anastasia Dogaru, Craniopagus twin
- Anastasia Dolby, British embroider and writer
- Anastasia Dolidze (born 1997), Russian pair skater
- Anastasia Dotsenko (born 1986), Russian cross-country skier
- Anastasia Dzyundzyak (born 1979), Uzbekistani artistic gymnast
- Anastasia Elfman (born 1990), American actress, dancer and burlesque artist
- Anastasia Eristavi-Khoshtaria (1868–1951), Georgian writer
- Anastasia Fedotova (born 1998), Russian athlete
- Anastasia Fesikova (born 1990), Russian swimmer
- Anastasia Fialkov, Israeli astrophysicist
- Anastasia Filatova (1920–2001), First Lady of Mongolia from 1952 to 1984
- Anastasia Filenko (born 1990), Ukrainian footballer
- Anastasia Flussmann, Austrian table tennis player
- Anastasia Fomina (born 1983), Russian basketball player
- Anastasia Frolova (born 1994), Russian tennis player
- Anastasia Ganias, American actress
- Anastasia Gasanova (born 1999), Russian tennis player
- Anastasia Giannakidou, Greek-born American linguist
- Anastasia Gimazetdinova (born 1980), Uzbekistani figure skater
- Anastasia Gkatsou (born 1997), Greek footballer
- Anastasia Gkotzi (born 1987), Greek basketball player
- Anastasia Gloushkov (born 1985), Israeli Olympic synchronized swimmer
- Anastasia Golovashkina (1993–2022), American political consultant
- Anastasia Golovina (1850–1933), Moldovan-Bulgarian physician
- Anastasia Golubeva (born 2006), Russian pair skater
- Anastasia Gorbenko (born 2003), Israeli Youth Olympic champion swimmer
- Anastasia Gorbunova (born 1994), Russian triathlete
- Anastasia Gorshkova (born 1987), Russian former competitive ice dancer
- Anastasia Goryacheva, Russian soloist of the Bolshoi Ballet
- Anastasia Gosteva (born 1975), Russian writer, journalist and translator
- Anastasia Gozhva (born 2001), Ukrainian figure skater
- Anastasia Griffith (born 1978), British actress
- Anastasia Grishina (born 1996), Russian artistic gymnast
- Anastasia Gromoglasova (born 1984), Russian pianist
- Anastasia Grymalska (born 1990), Italian tennis player
- Anastasia Guerra (born 1996), Italian volleyball player
- Anastasia Guzhenkova (born 1997), Russian swimmer
- Anastasia Hendrikova (1887–1918), Russian courtier
- Anastasia Hille (born 1965), British actress
- Anastasia Huppmann (born 1988), Russian-Austrian pianist
- Anastasia Iamachkine (born 2000), Peruvian tennis player
- Anastasia Ilyankova (born 2001), Russian artistic gymnast
- Anastasia Ivankova (born 1991), Belarusian rhythmic gymnast
- Anastasia Kaleva (born 2010), Bulgarian rhythmic gymnast
- Anastasia von Kalmanovich (born 1972), Russian actress and music producer
- Anastasia Karakasidou (born 1956), American scholar
- Anastasia Karpova (born 1984), Russian singer, best known as a member of girl group Serebro
- Anastasia Kelesidou (born 1972), Greek former discus thrower
- Anastasia Kempf (born 1997), German rhythmic gymnast
- Anastasia Kingsnorth (born 2000), British influencer
- Anastasia Kirillova (born 1996), Belarusian cross-country skier
- Anastasia Kirtadze (born 2009), Georgian chess player
- Anastasia Klimova (born 1994), Ukrainian footballer
- Anastasia Klose (born 1978), Australian artist
- Anastasia Kobekina (born 1994), Russian cellist
- Anastasia Kocherzhova (born 1990), Russian bobsledder
- Anastasia Konkina (born 1993), Russian judoka
- Anastasia Kostaki (born 1978), Greek basketball player
- Anastasia Kostyukova (born 1985), Russian footballer
- Anastasia Koval (born 1992), Ukrainian artistic gymnast
- Anastasia Kovaleva (born 2002), Russian tennis player
- Anastasia Kozhevnikova (born 1993), Ukrainian singer, songwriter and former member of the girl group Nu Virgos
- Anastasia Kravchenko (born 1986), Russian ski-orienteer
- Anastasia Kuleshova (born 1995), Russian cross-country skier
- Anastasia Kulikova (born 2000), Finnish-Russian tennis player
- Anastasia Kuzmina (born 1993), Ukrainian dancer and media personality
- Anastasiya Kuzmina (born 1984), Russian-born Slovak biathlete
- Anastasia Lagina (born 1995), Russian handball player
- Anastasia Lapsui (born 1944), Soviet-born Russian Nenets film director, screenwriter, radio journalist
- Anastasia Lazariuc (born 1953), Moldovan singer
- Anastasia Le-Roy (born 1987), Jamaican sprinter
- Anastasia Lebedeva (born 1993), Russian rower
- Anastasia Lin (born 1990), Chinese-Canadian actress and human rights advocate
- Anastasia Linnik (born 1993), Belarusian footballer
- Anastasia Lobach (born 1987), Belarusian handball player
- Anastasia Logunova (born 1990), Russian basketball player
- Anastasia Loukaitou-Sideris (born 1958), Greek-American academic
- Anastasia Luppova (born 1985), Russian billiards player and coach
- Anastasia Makarova (born 2003), Russian swimmer
- Anastasia Maksimova (born 1991), Russian rhythmic gymnast
- Anastasia Malhotra (born 1989), Japanese tennis player
- Anastasia Markovych (died 1729), Ukrainian Hetmana
- Anastasia Martin, British actress
- Anastasia Martiusheva (born 1995), Russian pair skater
- Anastasia Mejía, Guatemalan indigenous journalist
- Anastasia Melnichenko (born 1984), Ukrainian activist
- Anastasia Mikhailovna (1860–1922), grand duchess of Russia
- Anastasia Mishina (born 2001), Russian pair skater
- Anastasia Moskaleva (born 1994), Russian curler
- Anastasia Motaung, South African politician
- Anastasia Msosa, Malawian judge
- Anastasia Muliana, Indonesian-American mechanical engineer
- Anastasia Muñoz (born 1984), American voice actress affiliated with Funimation
- Anastasia Myskina (born 1981), Russian tennis player
- Anastasia Nabokina (born 1971), Russian ballerina
- Anastasia Nazarenko (born 1993), Russian rhythmic gymnast
- Anastasia Ndereba (born 1974), Kenyan marathon runner
- Anastasia Nechaeva (born 1993), Russian snooker and pool player
- Anastasia Negoda (born 1990), Russian musical artist
- Anastasia Nichita (born 1999), Moldovan freestyle wrestler
- Anastasia Nikolaevna (1901–1918), grand duchess of Russia
- Anastasia Nosova (born 1998), Russian inline artistic roller skater
- Anastasia Novitskaya, 19th-century Russian ballerina
- Anastasia Oberstolz-Antonova (born 1981), Russian-Italian luger
- Anastasia Pagonis (born 2004), American Paralympic swimmer
- Anastasia Panchenko (born 1990), Russian canoeist
- Anastasia Papadopoulou (born 1986), Greek footballer
- Anastasia Pastourmatzi (born 1977), Greek cyclist
- Anastasia Patsiou (born 1977), Greek handball player
- Anastasia Pavlova (born 1995), Ukrainian archer
- Anastasia Pavlyuchenkova (born 1991), Russian tennis player
- Anastasia Petrova (born 1997), Russian weightlifter
- Anastasia Phillips, Canadian actress
- Anastasia Pittman (born 1970), American politician
- Anastasia Pivovarova (born 1990), Russian tennis player
- Anastasia Platonova (born 1986), Russian ice dancer
- Anastasia Polibina (born 2000), Polish ice dancer
- Anastasia Pollard, American-born English painter
- Anastasia Poltoratskaya (born 1988), Russian tennis player
- Anastasia Poluianova (born 2001), Russian pair skater
- Anastasia Popova (born 1987), Russian journalist
- Anastasia Popova (born 1990), Belarusian footballer
- Anastasia Potapova (born 2001), Russian tennis player
- Anastasia Powell, Australian criminologist
- Anastasia Pozdeeva (born 1993), Russian footballer
- Anastasia Pozdniakova (born 1985), Russian Olympic diver
- Anastasia Prikhodko (born 1987), Ukrainian folk rock and traditional pop singer
- Anastasia Prokopenko (born 1986), Russian badminton player
- Anastasia Protasenya (born 1993), Russian triathlete
- Anastasia Pustovoitova (born 1981), Russian association football player
- Anastasia Pyrgioti (born 1992), Greek Paralympic boccia player
- Anastasia Radzinskaya (born 2014), Russian YouTuber
- Anastasia Rizikov (born 1998), Canadian classical pianist
- Anastasia Robinson, 18th-century English soprano and later contralto singer
- Anastasia Rodionova (born 1982), Russian-Australian tennis player
- Anastasia Rogozhina (born 2008), Finnish artistic gymnast
- Anastasia Romanova (born 1991), Russian weightlifter
- Anastasia Romanova (born 1993), Russian alpine ski racer
- Anastasia Romanovna (born 1530–1560), Tsarina of Russia
- Anastasia Rudnaya (born 1990), Russian orienteering competitor
- Anastasia Russkikh (born 1983), Russian badminton player
- Anastasia Ryabova, Russian contemporary artist
- Anastasia Rybachenko (born 1991), Russian political and civic activist
- Anastasia Rygalina (born 1996), Russian cross-country skier
- Anastasia Salina (born 1988), Russian volleyball player
- Anastasia Samoylova, Russian-born American artist
- Anastasia Savchenko (born 1989), Russian pole vaulter
- Anastasia Savina (born 1992), Russian chess player
- Anastasia Sergeeva (born 1987), Russian canoeist
- Anastasia Shcherbachenia (born 1990), Belarusian footballer
- Anastasia Shevchenko (born 1979), Russian public figure and civil activist
- Anastasia Shevtsova (born 1995), Russian ballerina and actor
- Anastasia Shishmakova (born 2000), Russian artistic gymnast
- Anastasia M. Shkilnyk (1945–2014), German-born Ukrainian-Canadian anthropologist
- Anastasia Shlyakhovaya (born 1990), Russian volleyball player
- Anastasia Shpilevaya (born 1999), Russian ice dancer
- Anastasia Shuppo (born 1997), Belarusian footballer
- Anastasia Sidiropoulou (born 1992), Greek model
- Anastasia Sidorova (born 1996), Russian artistic gymnast
- Anastasia Silveri (born 1984), Italian model
- Anastasia Simakova (born 2004), Russian rhythmic gymnast
- Anastasia Simanovich (born 1995), Russian water polo player
- Anastasia Sinitsyna (born 1983), Russian handball player
- Anastasia Sivayeva (born 1991), Russian actress
- Anastasia Sivolobova (born 1998), Moldovan footballer
- Anastasia Skoptsova (born 2000), Russian ice dancer
- Anastasia Skultan (born 1984), Russian curler
- Anastasia Vladimirovna Slanevskaya, known professionally as Slava (born 1980), Russian singer, actress, model and public figure
- Anastasia Sletova-Chernova (1873–1938), Russian politician
- Anastasia Slonova (born 1984), Moldovan footballer
- Anastassiya Slonova (born 1991), Kazakh cross-country skier
- Anastasia Soare (born 1957), Romanian-American billionaire businesswoman
- Anastasia Somoza (born 1983/1984), American disability rights advocate
- Anastasia Sorokina (born 1980), Belarusian chess player
- Anastasia Spyridonidou (born 1997), Greek footballer
- Anastasia Stashkevich (born 1984), Russian principal dancer of the Bolshoi Ballet
- Anastasia Stavrova, Russian mathematician
- Anastasia Stotskaya (born 1982), Russian singer
- Anastasia Suslova (born 1996), Russian handball player
- Anastasia Synn (born 1975), Canadian entertainer and activist
- Anastasia Syromyatnikova (1915–1997), Russian Yakut writer
- Anastasia Tambovtseva (born 1982), Russian bobsledder and luger
- Anastasia Tarakanova (born 2004), Russian figure skater
- Anastasia Tatalina (born 2000), Russian freestyle skier
- Anastasia Tatareva (born 1997), Russian rhythmic gymnast
- Anastasia Taylor-Lind, English-Swedish journalist
- Anastasia Tikhonova (born 2001), Russian tennis player
- Anastasia Tjendri-Liew, founder of Bengawan Solo
- Anastasia Tolmacheva (born 1995), Russian-born Romanian biathlete
- Anastasia Toma (born 1996), Moldovan footballer
- Anastasia de Torby (1892–1977), German-born Russian-British morganatic daughter of grand duke of Russia Michael Mikhailovich
- Anastasia Trofimova (born 1987), Canadian documentary filmmaker
- Anastasia Trusova (born 1989), Russian model and beauty queen
- Anastasia Tsakiri (born 1979), Greek weightlifter
- Anastasia Tsichlas, South African football executive
- Anastasia Tsilimpiou (born 1997), Greek actress
- Anastasia Tsvetayeva (1894–1993), Russian writer
- Anastasia Tumanishvili-Tsereteli (1849–1932), Georgian writer and educator
- Anastasia Udaltsova (born 1978), Russian politician
- Anastasia Uzunova (1862–1948), Macedonian Bulgarian revolutionary
- Anastasia Vaipan-Law (born 1999), Scottish pair skater
- Anastasia Valueva (born 1994), Russian taekwondo practitioner
- Anastasia Vashukevich (born 1990), Belarusian escort worker
- Anastasia Vasilyeva (born 1984), Russian ophthalmologist
- Anastasia Vasina (born 1987), Russian beach volleyball player
- Anastasia Vedyakova, Russian composer
- Anastasia Vinnikova (born 1991), Belarusian singer
- Anastasia Vlasova, Ukrainian photojournalist
- Anastasia Vlasova, Russian skier
- Anastassiya Vlassova (born 1996), Kazakh footballer
- Anastasia Volkova (born c. 1991), Ukrainian agricultural innovator
- Anastasia Volochkova (born 1976), Russian prima ballerina
- Anastasia Volovich (born 1976), Russian physicist
- Anastasia Voynova (born 1993), Russian cyclist
- Anastasia Voznesenskaya (1943–2022), Soviet and Russian actress
- Anastasia Vyaltseva (c. 1871–1913), Russian opera singer
- Anastasia Vykhodtseva (born 1991), Polish figure skater
- Anastasia Webb (born 1999), American artistic gymnast
- Anastasia Williams (born 1957), American politician
- Anastasia Yendiki, American academic
- Anastasia Zadorozhnaya (born 1985), Russian actress
- Anastasia Zagoruiko (born 1988), Russian biathlete
- Anastasia Zakharova (born 2002), Russian tennis player
- Anastasia Zarycká (born 1998), Ukrainian-Czech tennis player
- Anastasia Zavorotnyuk (1971–2024), Russian actress and television presenter
- Anastasia Zhukova (born 1974), Russian politician
- Anastasia Zolotareva (born 2002), Russian tennis player
- Anastasia Zubkova (born 1980), Russian water polo player
- Anastasia Zuyeva (1896–1986), Russian actress
- Anastasia Zyurkalova (born 1991), Ukrainian stage and film actress
- Soleil Anastasia Sorge, known simply as Soleil Sorge (born 1994), Italian and American model, television presenter, television personality and showgirl

== Fictional characters with the given name ==
- Anastasia, a character from the game series The Idolmaster Cinderella Girls
- Princess Anastasia Nikolaevna Romanov, from the 1997 animated film of the same name and based on the real life Grand Duchess Anastasia Nikolaevna of Russia
- Anastasia Tremaine, a main character in the 1950 Walt Disney's animated film Cinderella
- Anastasia The Ninth, A mentioned character and founder of The Ninth House in the Locked Tomb series by Tamsyn Muir.
- Anastasia Hoshin, a character from the light novel/anime series Re:Zero − Starting Life in Another World
- Anastasia Steele, a character from the erotic novel Fifty Shades of Grey
- Anastasya Feodorovna Snezhnaya, the Cryo Archon and Tsaritsa of all Snezhnaya from the game Genshin Impact

== See also ==
- Sant'Anastasia (disambiguation)
- Saint Anastasia (disambiguation)
- Anastasia of Russia (disambiguation)
- Anastasia (surname)
- Anastacia (given name)
- Anastasie
- Anastasiia
- Anastasija
- Anastasiya
- Anastassia
- Anastatia (disambiguation)
- Annastasia
- Antasia, a genus of moths in the family Geometridae
- Anastazia Wambura (born 1965), Tanzanian politician
