= Czerniawski =

Czerniawski (feminine: Czerniawska, plural: Czerniawscy) , sometimes spelled Cherniawski, Cherniawsky, Cherniawsky, Czerniavski, or Cherniavsky is a Polish surname. It is a toponymic surname derived from any of the Polish locations named Czerniawa or Czerniawka. Notable people with the surname include:

- Dustin Cherniawski (born 1981), Canadian football player, Emirates American Football League executive
- Józefa Czerniawska-Pęksa (born 1937), Polish cross-country skier
- Mieczysław Czerniawski (1948–2026), Polish politician
- Piotr Czerniawski (born 1976), Polish poet
- Roman Czerniawski (1910–1985), Polish Air Force pilot and double agent
- Ryszard Czerniawski (1952–2019), Polish lawyer and economist
