= Kalmanovich =

Kalmanovich is a surname. Notable people with the surname include:

- Anna Kalmanovich (fl. 1893–1917), Russian feminist and suffragette
- Dov Kalmanovich, Israeli politician
- Shabtai Kalmanovich (1947–2009), Russian KGB spy and businessman
- Zelig Kalmanovich (1885–1944), Lithuanian philologist, translator and historian

== See also ==
- Anastasia von Kalmanovich (born 1972), Russian actress and music producer
