= Syromyatnikov =

Syromyatnikov (Russian: Сыромятников) is a Russian occupational masculine surname originating from the word syromyatnik, meaning a buckskin leather dresser; its feminine counterpart is Syromyatnikova. It may refer to the following notable people:

- Anastasia Syromyatnikova (1915–1997), Yakut writer
- Vladimir Syromyatnikov (1933–2006), Russian space scientist
