= Valeria Galimova =

Russian classical guitarist

Valeria Galimova Russian: Валерия Галимова
- Born: July 11, 1994 (age 30); Kamensk-Uralsky
- Genres: Classical
- Occupation: Classical guitarist
- Instrument: Guitar
- Website: valeriagalimova.com

Valeria Dmitrievna Galimova, in Russian: Валерия Дмитриевна Галимова (July 7, 1994, Kamensk-Uralsky) is a classical guitarist from Russia.

== Biography ==
She began studying classical guitar at the age of eight under Dmitry Milovanov at Music School No. 1 in Kamensk-Uralsky, Russia. She later pursued further training at the Gnessin State Musical College in Moscow, studying with Roman Zorkin and Anastasia Bardina, before graduating from the Russian Academy of Gnessin under Professor Artyom Dervoed. At fourteen, she was invited to participate as both an artist and jury member at an international children’s festival competition in Puebla, Mexico.

Over the years, Galimova has received several awards, including a Prize of the President of Russia and a gold medal at the Delphic Games in 2014. She has won ten first prizes in various Russian and international competitions.

Her professional activities include both solo performances and collaborations. In 2017, she worked with "World of Music," a Russian music distributor, to create an instructional video series on classical guitar. In 2018, she premiered the suite "The Dance" for guitar and string quartet at the 2nd Moscow Festival of Guitar Chamber Music "The Golden Fretboards". The same year, she took part in a production of Astor Piazzolla's tango-opera "María de Buenos Aires" with the "Leggiero" orchestra at the Rachmaninov Hall of the Moscow State Tchaikovsky Conservatory. In 2020, she performed a solo concert at the "Guitar Virtuosi" festival in the Chamber Hall of the Moscow Philharmonic.

She has worked with musicians from different backgrounds, including harpsichordist Anastasia Antonova, bayanist Kirill Rusinov, cellist Valeria Rupasova, violinist Asiia Garipova, coloratura soprano Ekaterina Sokolnikova, and conductor Jeremy Walker from England.

Galimova has also taken part in international festivals and cultural programs, performing concerts and conducting masterclasses. In 2024, she held a classical guitar concert and public talk in Dilijan, Armenia, organized by the Primavera Foundation. She has been selected as a scholar at the International Guitar Festival Rust, which features emerging classical guitarists.

Her work includes performances, educational activities, and participation in competitions and festivals in Europe, Russia, and other regions.
