= Anastassia =

Anastassia is a feminine given name. Notable people with the given name include:

- Anastassia Kovalenko (born 1991), Estonian motorcycle road racer
- Anastassia Khozissova (born 1979), Russian model
- Anastassia Michaeli (born 1975), Israeli journalist, television presenter, and politician
- Anastassia Morkovkina (born 1981), Estonian footballer

== See also ==
- Anastasia
- Anastasiia
- Anastassiya
- Anastassya Kudinova
