= Cherniavsky =

Cherniavsky (Russian: Чернявский, Ukrainian: Чернявський, Russian feminine: Cherniavskaya, Ukrainian feminine: Cherniavska) is a Russian- and Ukrainian-language surname. It may be associated with the Chernyavsky noble family of the Polish-Lithuanian Commonwealth and Russian Empire. It is derived from Polish Czerniawski. Notable people with the surname include:

- Anastasia Chernyavsky, Russian-born American photographer
- Aleh Charnyawski (born 1970) Belarusian athlete
- Daniel Cherniavsky (born 1933), Argentinian writer and television producer
- Joseph Cherniavsky (c. 1890–1959), American composer and bandleader
- Olga Chernyavskaya (born 1963), Russian athlete
- Sally Fox (photographer) (1929–2006), American photographer and editor
- Vlada Chernyavskaya (born 1966), Belarusian badminton player
