= Suzanne Haber =

American academic

Suzanne N. Haber is an American academic and neuroscientist. She is a professor at the University of Rochester, and in the Department of Psychiatry of Harvard Medical School (McLean Hospital). She is known for her research on the neural circuitry of the basal ganglia and its implications in psychiatric disorders. She is co-principal investigator on an USD 23 Mio. grant of the NIH BRAIN initiative and principal investigator of an NIH Conte Center to study obsessive–compulsive disorder. She has been councilor of the Society for Neuroscience and is editor of a scientific text book on the frontal cortex.

== Early life and education ==
Haber obtained her undergraduate degree from Kent State University. She earned her Ph.D. in Neuro and Bio-Behavioral Science from the Stanford University in 1978.

== Career ==
After completing her doctorate, Haber conducted postdoctoral research at the University of Minnesota with Bob Elde and, later with Walle Nauta at MIT. She joined the faculty at the University of Rochester Medical Center in 1983, where she became a full professor in the Department of Pharmacology and Physiology.. While she retains an appointment at the University of Rochester, she has moved her main lab McLean Hospital and is a Professor in the Department of Psychiatry, Harvard Medical School.

== Research ==
Haber's research focuses on the anatomy and function of the basal ganglia and associated cortical regions. She employs neuroanatomical tracing techniques in primates to map the connections between different brain areas. Her work has provided insights into how these neural circuits contribute to normal behavior and how their dysfunction may lead to psychiatric conditions like OCD and depression.

== Awards and honors ==
- Dana Foundation Award: Recognized for her contributions to understanding brain circuitry.
- Distinguished Investigator Grant: Brain & Behavior Research Foundation
- Elected Fellow of the American College of Neuropsychopharmacology (2007)
- NIMH Merit Award (1989–1997)
- Gold Medal Award, Society of Biological Psychiatry (2020)
- Elected to National Academy of Medicine

== Selected publications ==
- Haber, S.N., & Knutson, B. (2010). The reward circuit: linking primate anatomy and human imaging. Neuropsychopharmacology, 35(1), 4–26.
- Haber, S.N. (2016). Corticostriatal circuitry. Dialogues in Clinical Neuroscience, 18 (1), 7–21.
- Haber SN, Yendiki A, Jbabdi S. Four deep brain stimulation targets for obsessive-compulsive disorder: Are they different? BPS. 2020:1-33. doi:10.1016/j.biopsych.2020.06.031
- Banich MT, Haber S, Robbins TW, eds. The Frontal Cortex: Organization, Networks, and Function. The MIT Press; 2024.
