= Cherniavsky (disambiguation) =

Cherniavsky is a Russian surname. Cherniavsky may also refer to:

- Cherniavsky Trio, Jewish Ukrainian and Canadian musical group
- Chernyavsky, Novosibirsk, village in Novosibirsk Oblast, Russia
