= Anastasia Romanova (skier) =

Russian alpine skier (born 1993)

Personal information
- Born: 11 October 1993 (age 32) Tumanny, Murmansk Oblast

Skiing career
- Sport: Alpine skiing

Anastasia Romanova (born 11 October 1993, Tumanny, Murmansk Oblast, Russia) is a Russian alpine ski racer.

She competed at the 2015 World Championships in Beaver Creek, USA, in the giant slalom.
