= Anastasia Negoda =

- Birth name: Anastasia Yurievna Negoda Russian: Анастасия Юрьевна Негода
- Also known as: Nastya Negoda
- Born: June 12, 1990 (age 35); Terenga, Ulyanovsk Oblast, RSFSR, USS
- Genres: pop-music
- Occupation(s): singer, tv presenter, journalist, model, actress and blogger
- Years active: 2021–present
- Website: nastyanegoda.ru

Anastasia Yurievna Negoda (Russian: Анастасия Юрьевна Негода, born June 12, 1990, Terenga, Ulyanovsk Oblast, RSFSR, USSR), better known as Nastya Negoda, is a Russian singer, TV presenter, journalist, model, actress and blogger.

She has been broadcast on music TV channels following the success of her song "Let's run away to Mars", first released on Europa Plus.

== Early years ==
Negoda was born on the 12th of June, 1990, in the small village of Terenga, in the Ulyanovsk Oblast.

She began singing at the age of two, and began learning the piano at the age of 4. At the age of 7, Negoda moved with her family to the village of Radishchevo, where they lived for 10 years.

At the age of nine, Negoda enrolled at a music school, and learnt the guitar.

=== Education ===
After graduating at 17, Negoda went to study in Ulyanovsk, graduating as a stage director of theatrical works.

Negoda also has a degree in Journalism from Ulyanovsk State University.

== Career ==
After graduating from university, Negoda worked for several years in Ulyanovsk as a correspondent in the newspaper "Breath of the Earth" and the editor-in-chief of the magazine "Taste of Life".

In 2021, Negoda began to focus on the music industry. Her first solo performance took place on the 6th of May, 2022, at the Moscow club Sixteen Tons.

In 2022, Negoda became a presenter on the channel Fashion TV, of a show about news from social media. Negoda also worked as the host of Dance Chart on the Europa Plus TV channel, and starred in a series of programs about the lives of artists for the Russian TV channel MusicBox.

Since 2022, Negoda has been the presenter of the show MuzGorDvizh on the Muz-TV channel, and presenter of Friday on the Beauty Horoscope channel.

== Discography ==
=== In original language ===
- «Снега больше не будет» (2021)
- «Дождь» (2021)
- «Нет души» (2021)
- «Останови меня» (2021)
- «Сердце, чувства» (2021)
- «Какая есть» (2021)
- «Мосты горят» (2022)
- «Рассветы» (2022)
- «Давай сбежим на марс» (2022)
- «Герой боевика» (2022)
