= Dustin Cherniawski =

Canadian football player (born 1981)

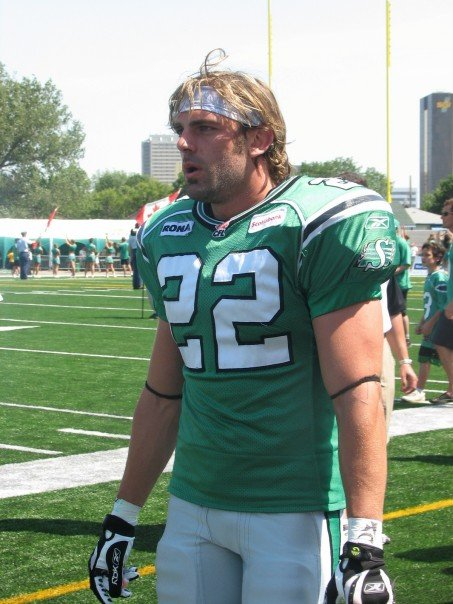
- Cherniawski of the Saskatchewan Roughriders at Taylor Field in Regina, Saskatchewan - 2007

No. 22
- Position: Defensive back

Personal information
- Born: September 22, 1981 (age 45); Edmonton, Alberta, Canada
- Listed height: 6 ft 0 in (1.83 m)
- Listed weight: 210 lb (95 kg)

Career information
- University: University of British Columbia
- CFL draft: 2005: 5th round, 39th overall pick

Career history
- 2005–2007: Saskatchewan Roughriders

Awards and highlights
- Grey Cup champion (2007); CIS Canada-West All-Star (2004); CIS 2nd Team All-Canadian (2004); CJFL All-Star (2001)
- Stats at CFL.ca (archive)

Dustin Cherniawski (born September 22, 1981) is a Canadian former professional football free safety who played for the Saskatchewan Roughriders of the Canadian Football League (CFL). Cherniawski was drafted in the 5th round of the 2005 CFL draft, 39th overall.

In 2005, he dressed in a total of 17 regular season games and 1 playoff game as a backup defensive back and special teams player, recording 19 special teams tackles in the regular season. In 2006, he dressed in all 18 games and recorded 18 special teams tackles. He played in both playoff games, including the successful Western Semi-Final win over the Calgary Stampeders. In 2007, Cherniawski suffered a knee injury versus the BC Lions and missed 6 regular season games. On November 25, 2007, Cherniawski was part of the winning team at the 95th Grey Cup in Toronto, Ontario, winning 23-19 over the Winnipeg Blue Bombers.

On May 27, 2008, he announced his retirement from the CFL to pursue career opportunities in Dubai, United Arab Emirates and is currently the owner and general manager of the Emirates American Football League (EAFL).

Cherniawski played for the UBC Thunderbirds from 2002-2004. In 2004, he was selected as a Canada-West All-Star, 2nd Team All-Canadian, and played in the East vs West All-Star game in Windsor, Ontario. He graduated from UBC with a degree in commerce.

Prior to university he played for the Edmonton Huskies of the Canadian Junior Football League from 1999 to 2001, winning several team and league awards.
