= Nastja =

Nastja is a given name used in Eastern European countries. It is a diminutive form of the Greek name Anastasia. Other forms include Nastya, Nastia. Although historically the name has been feminine, in Slovenia, Nastja is a unisex name.

Nastja, Nastia, Nastya, or Nasťa may refer to:

== Nastia ==
- Nastia Korkia, Russian filmmaker
- Nastia Liukin (born 1989), Russian-American Olympic gymnast

== Nastja ==
- Nastja Čeh (born 1978), Slovenian footballer
- Nastja Claessens (born 2004), Belgian basketball player
- Nastja Govejšek (born 1997), Slovenian swimmer
- Nastja Kolar (born 1994), Slovenian tennis player

== Nastya ==
- Nastya Ivleeva (born 1991), Russian TV presenter, actress, and blogger
- Nastya Kamenskih (born 1987), Ukrainian singer
- Like Nastya (born 2014), Russian YouTuber
- Nastya Ryzhikh (born 1977), Russian-German pole vaulter whose name was Germanised to Anastasija Reiberger when she became a German citizen
- Nastya Sten (born 1995), Russian fashion model
