= Ryszard Czerniawski =

Polish lawyer and economist (1952–2019)

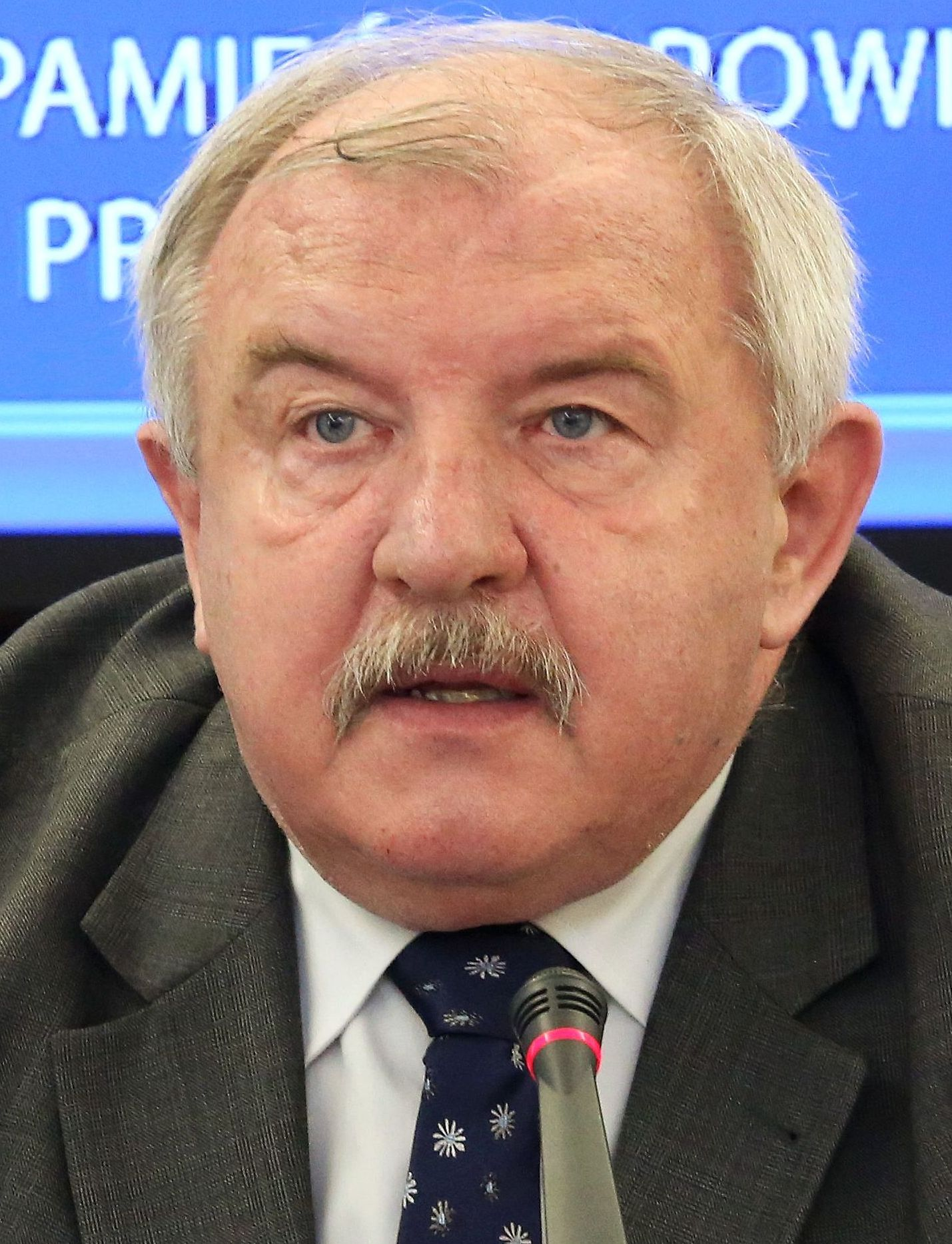
Ryszard Czerniawski

Ryszard Waldemar Czerniawski (20 August 1952 – 31 August 2019) was a Polish lawyer and economist. In 2000, he was awarded Knight's Cross of the Order of Polonia Restituta.

== Career ==
He studied law at the University of Warsaw and international trade at SGH Warsaw School of Economics. He worked as a journalist from 1976 to 1990, first at the Polish Press Agency and then at the weekly Prawo i Życie (Law and Life). In 2008, he received a doctorate in law from Lazarski University and in 2015 habilitation from University of Białystok.

Between 1990 and 1991 he was head of the Legal Department within the Capital Markets Development Division at the Ministry of Privatisation; and from 1991 until 1994 a Director of the Legal Department at the Warsaw Stock Exchange, eventually becoming Vice-Chairman of the Board of the Warsaw Stock Exchange in 1994, where he worked until June 2006.

From 1994 until 2006, Czerniawski was a member of the Supervisory Board of the National Depository for Securities, and between 1998 and 2001 served as the board's Chairman. In the period 2001–2003, he was a member of the Supervisory Board of Centrum Giełdowe S.A. and the company's subsidiary Infogiełda SA.

From 2012 to 2015 he was also vice-ombudsman.

He died on 31 August 2019.

== Publications ==
He was the author of numerous publications on securities trading, including:

- The first edition of Commentary on the Privatisation Act (1990),
- Commentary on Commercial Companies' Code provisions relating to Joint Stock Companies (2001)
- Commentary on the Bonds Act (2003).
- Co-author of a commentary on the Securities Public Trading Act (1996, 2001, 2002)
- Co-author of a guide for supervisory board members Between law and finance (2007).
- Giełdy (Stock Markets) (1992)
- Poradnik akcjonariusza (Shareholders' Handbook) (1991)
- Statuty Giełdy Warszawskiej (Statutes of the Warsaw Stock Exchange) (1995)
- The English edition of Statutes of the Warsaw Stock Exchange (1999)
- Zarząd spółki akcyjnej (The Management Board of a Joint Stock Company) (2007).

== See also ==
- Bartosz Pastuszka
- Józef Wojciechowski
