= South African Football Association =

Governing body of football in South Africa

CAF
- Short name: SAFA
- Founded: 1892 (original); 1991
- Headquarters: Johannesburg
- FIFA affiliation: 1992
- CAF affiliation: 1992
- COSAFA affiliation: 1997
- President: Danny Jordaan
- Website: www.safa.net

The South African Football Association (SAFA) is the national administrative governing body that controls the sport of football in South Africa and is a member of the Confederation of African Football (CAF). It was established in 1991. The South African Football Association is the second football association in South Africa to be named the South African Football Association and is also the second football association in South Africa to affiliate to FIFA. The present day South African Football Association, unlike its predecessor during the apartheid era, allows for a mixed-race national team.

SAFA was admitted to FIFA in 1992 and its senior team has since represented South Africa at the Africa Cup of Nations and the FIFA World Cup. During SAFA's time as the FIFA-affiliated football organisation, South Africa has also hosted several editions of the COSAFA Cup also the 1996 Africa Cup of Nations, 2010 FIFA World Cup and the 2013 Africa Cup of Nations.

The South African Football Association is responsible for the administration of the South African national football teams (both men's and women's), and the third tier and below of the South African Football league system. The Premier Soccer League administers the top two divisions and several cup competitions.

== History ==
=== South African Football Association (1892) ===
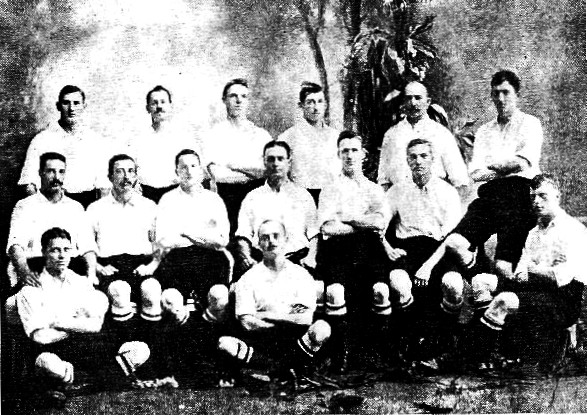
The South Africa team of 1906

The founding of the first football associations in South Africa were influenced by arrival of many British soldiers to South Africa. The original South African Football Association was a white only organisation established in 1892. The year started with a Currie Cup match where Western Province beat Griqualand West. Matches were being played before the formation of SAFA, the Natal Football Association was established in 1882 by five football clubs. The sport was initially supported by the English-speaking community and after World War I by immigrants from European countries. Crowds of over 20,000 attended local matches in Johannesburg after World War II. There was good relationship between football and rugby, with rugby grounds being used by football clubs. Many Premier Soccer League (PSL) clubs are still using rugby stadiums. The first overseas visitors to South Africa were English club Corinthians in 1897, the visitors did not lose any of the 23 matches. In 1906 , the nation's first international match took place against Argentina in Buenos Aires, where South Africa won 1–0. 1907 saw the first black association formed; The Durban & District African Football Association. The South African Football Association was the first national governing body on the continent and affiliated to FIFA in 1910. The SAFA of 1892 was the first association on the African continent to become affiliated to FIFA. SAFA withdrew from FIFA in 1924 and later regained full membership in 1952.

In 1932, the South African African Football Association (SAAFA) was formed and a year later the South African Bantu Football Association (SABFA) and the South African Coloured Football Association (SACFA) followed suit. In September 1951, the three merged to form the anti-apartheid South African Soccer Federation (SASF). The South African Football Association struggled for the right to represent South African in world football (FIFA) against South African Soccer Federation (SASF) SASF claimed it was the legitimate representative of South Africa considering three-fourths of football players were registered within SASF.

SAFA were expected to play in the newly formed Confederation of African Football's 1957 Africa Cup of Nations, however they did not. The minutes of the meetings between SAFA and their counterparts from Ethiopia, Egypt and Sudan were lost to fire and so the official reason for their non-appearance is unknown. Fred Fell, SAFA's representative at FIFA said that SAFA withdrew because of the conflict at the Suez Canal. There were also rumours that they were expelled from the initial competition due to their favourable stance on apartheid.

In November 1954, the SASF attempted to join FIFA. In May 1955, FIFA concluded that SAFA does not have "the standing of a real national association" because it did not control all clubs, there were more clubs and players with SASF than SAFA. SASF's application was rejected because there were no white players. In 1956, FIFA chose to accept SAFA's stance that segregation was a "tradition and custom" in South Africa.

The South African Football Association were renamed to the Football Association of South Africa (FASA) in 1957. The newly renamed association also removed a clause from its constitution excluding non-whites. In his book African Soccerscapes, Professor Peter Alegi says this was to "create the perception of substantive change while maintaining the status quo".

In 1959, the SASF successfully managed to have a FIFA sanctioned game between Brazilian club Portuguesa Santista and white South Africa cancelled, as the Brazilian club had agreed to withdraw its black players from the game. The SASF had complained to the Brazilian consul in Cape Town, the Brazilian government prevented the club from taking part.

At FIFA's 1960 Congress in Rome, an anti-racism resolution was adopted that demanded the Football Association of South Africa (FASA) integrate football within a year or they would be expelled from FIFA. There were calls from the Soviet bloc and Asia for the South African Soccer Federation (SASF) to become a member of FIFA in place of FASA. The calls were rejected as FIFA's own statutes stated that "a National Association must be open to all who practice football in that country whether amateur, 'non-amateur', or professional and without any racial, religious, political discrimination". FASA as well as South Africa were also expelled for the Confederation Africaine de Football for discrimination.

In September 1961, FASA were suspended from FIFA because of their pro-apartheid stance and refusal to field non-white players. This was the first time a major organisation had expelled the administration of South Africa. Also, in 1961 the white-South Africa sympathiser Stanley Rous was elected as FIFA President. Rous and United States citizen Joseph Maguire would later visit white South African officials for two weeks. Rous reported to FIFA that there was no wilful discrimination within FASA and on the basis of his report, FASA were allowed back into FIFA in September 1963.

At the Tokyo Congress, the Confederation of African Football members were lobbying for the expulsion of the FASA unless its "obnoxious apartheid policy [was] totally eliminated". They had retained the support of Soviet and Asian National Associations and held meetings with South African Soccer Federation in Durban and the South African Non-Racial Olympic Committee in London. CAF had already expelled South Africa from its own membership. The request for expulsion from FIFA was downgraded to suspension and it was passed by a majority of associations at the 1964 FIFA Congress.

Following the suspension, South Africa were also not allowed to take part in the 1964 and 1968 Olympics and were expelled from the Olympic movement in 1970. During this time Rous had been lobbying to have South Africa re-instated into FIFA and the Olympics. In 1973, Brazilian FIFA President candidate Joao Havelange withdrew Brazil from the 1973 South African Games to curry favour with the anti-apartheid national associations and went to beat Rous in the FIFA Presidential Election. At the FIFA Congress on 16 July 1976 in Montreal, FASA were formally suspended from FIFA. Members of FIFA had voted to exclude South Africa 78 votes to 9.

On 8 December 1991, many opposing football associations came together in a "unity" process that eventually formed a non-racial South African Football Association. In January 1992, the Confederation Africaine de Football also reinstated South Africa into their football organisation.

=== South African Football Association (1991) ===
The new South African Football Association was founded on 23 March 1991, the culmination of a long unity process that was to rid the sport in South Africa of all its past racial division.

A delegation of the SAFA received a standing ovation at the congress of the Confederation of African Football (CAF) in Dakar, Senegal a month later, where South Africa were accorded observer status. South Africa's membership of the world governing body FIFA was confirmed at their congress in Zürich in June 1992.

Membership of CAF followed automatically and South Africa was back on the world stage, and were awarded the right to host the 2010 FIFA World Cup in South Africa.

Within a month the country hosted their first international match as World Cup quarterfinalists Cameroon came to play in three matches to celebrate the unity process. In September 1992, South Africa played its first junior international against Botswana at under-16 level in Lenasia and to date the country has entered a team in each of FIFA's and CAF's competitions, from under-17 to national team level, and also for the women's team.

In the short space of six years, SAFA has achieved remarkable success with qualification for the World Cup finals in France in 1998, the title of African champions at the 1996 African Nations Cup finals, which the country hosted, and the runners-up berth in Burkina Faso two years later.

At under-20 level, South Africa were runners-up at the 1997 African Youth Championship in Morocco and qualified to play at the 1997 FIFA World Youth Championship in Malaysia. At under-17 level, South Africa was the runners-up at 2015 African U-17 Championship hosted in Niger thereby qualifying to compete at 2015 FIFA U-17 World Cup hosted in Chile.

At club level, Orlando Pirates won the prestigious African Champions Cup in 1995, the first club from the southern African region to take the title in more than 30 years of competition. Pirates were playing in the event for the first time and won the title away from home in the Ivory Coast to further amplify the magnificence of the victory. Mamelodi Sundowns won the 2016 CAF Champions League and qualified for the 2016 FIFA Club World Cup in Japan, their first appearance in the FIFA Club World Cup.

Behind the scenes, SAFA provides the structures to take football to all levels of the South African community. There are now national age-group competitions from under-12 level up, qualified coaches working around the country and nine provincial affiliates, who are further divided into 52 regions.

== National Executive ==
Position	Name
President:	Danny Jordaan
Vice-president	Anastasia Tsichlas
Vice-president	Linda Zwane
Vice-president	Bennett Bailey
Vice-president	Irvin Khoza
CEO/ General Secretary	Lydia Monyepao

As of January 2025

== National teams ==
- Under-17 (Amajimbos)
- Under-20 (Amajita)
- Under-23 (Amaglug-glug)
- Under-15
- Senior National Team (Bafana Bafana)
- Under-17 Women (Bantwana)
- Under-20 Women (Basidzana)
- Under-23 Women
- Senior Women's National Team (Banyana Banyana)
- South Africa national beach soccer team
- South Africa national futsal team

== Regions ==
SAFA's 9 Provinces and 52 Regions

- SAFA Eastern Cape (Regions: Alfred Nzo, Amathole, Sarah Baartman, Chris Hani, Nelson Mandela Bay, OR Tambo, Joe Gqabi)
- SAFA Free State (Regions: Fezile Dabi, Lejweleputswa, Motheo, Thabo Mofutsanyana, Xhariep)
- SAFA Gauteng (Regions: Ekurhuleni, Johannesburg, Metsweding, Sedibeng, Tshwane, West Rand)
- SAFA KwaZulu-Natal (Regions: Amajuba, Ethekwini, iLembe, Harry Gwala, Ugu, Umgungundlovu, Umkhanyakude, Umzinyathi, Uthukela, Uthungulu, Zululand)
- SAFA Mpumalanga (Regions: Ehlanzeni, Gert Sibande, Nkangala)
- SAFA Northern Cape (Regions: Frances Baard, Kgalagadi, Namakwa, Pixley-Ka-Seme, ZF Mgcawu)
- SAFA Limpopo (Regions: Capricorn, Mopani, Sekhukhune, Vhembe, Waterberg)
- SAFA North-West (Regions: Bojanala, Bophirima, Central, Southern)
- SAFA Western Cape (Regions: Boland, Cape Town, Central Karoo, Garden Route, Overberg, West Coast)

== Fraud charges ==
In November 2024, SAFA president Danny Jordaan was arrested for fraud and accused of using the organisation's funds for personal gain. Jordaan faced calls to step down, but is running for re-election as SAFA president in January 2025.

== Financial difficulties and sponsorship ==
In March 2025, SAFA was unable to pay monthly staff salaries, citing insufficient sponsorship and delayed payment by partners.

In March 2026, SAFA signed a sponsorship deal with Standard Bank.
