= Anastassiya =

Anastassiya is a female given name. Notable people with this given name include the following:

- Anastassiya Bannova (born 1989), Kazakhstani archer
- Anastassiya Batuyeva (born 1987), Kazakhstani handball player
- Anastassiya Krestova (born 1996), Kazakhstani short track speed skater
- Anastassiya Prilepa, (born 1990), Kazakhstani swimmer
- Anastassiya Rodina (born 1991), Kazakhstani handball player
- Anastassiya Rostovchshikova (born 1994), Kazakhstani volleyball player
- Anastassiya Slonova (born 1991), Kazakhstani cross-country skier
- Anastassiya Soprunova (born 1986), Kazakhstani hurdler
- Anastassiya Vinogradova (born 1986), Kazakhstani hurdler

== See also ==
- Anastassya Kudinova
- Anastasiya
- Anastassia
