= Anastasia Volkova =

Ukrainian agricultural innovator (born c. 1991)

- Born: 1991 (age 34–35); Ukraine
- Education: Universities in Kyiv, Warsaw and Sydney
- Known for: agricultural innovator

Anastasia Volkova (born c.1991) is a Ukrainian agricultural innovator using satellite and autonomous drone technology to give an early indication of disease in crops. She studied in Ukraine, Poland and Australia. In 2020 she was living in Australia with business links to her company Flurosat in Ukraine. Her work has been recognised by the BBC and the MIT Technology Review and it had attracted substantial funding as of 2020.

== Life ==
She began her university studies in Kyiv before she went to Poland to obtain a master's degree. Her doctorate was obtained from the University of Sydney in 2018 after she had been in Australia for three years. She founded a company named Flurosat which analyses satellite pictures to provide advice to farmers about their crops. In 2017 her initial bid for funding attracted A1m$. By 2019 the company had raised $8.6m including 3.2m from a group led by Microsoft M12. In 2018 her company bought an Australian company called Production Wise that had ten years experience in the sector.

Volkova whose godparent was a farmer realised that she could use her skills to improve crop yields. Crops that are infected with a disease concentrate their efforts in fighting the disease and this is at the expense of normal development. Volkova's software spots these changes by comparing the satellite pictures of a particular field with a reference set of readings. Her PhD concerned the use of autonomous drones and she was asked how this technology could help rural areas. Her answer to this challenge was a recipe for creating the Flurosat company. Volkova presented her ideas at a TEDx event in Sydney.

Volkova was recognised by MIT Technology Review magazine in its under 35 section. In November 2020, the BBC announced that Volkova was to be included in their 100 women - a list of inspiring women from around the world. Volkova was then living in Australia in 2020 but her company included a Ukrainian development team.
