= Bartosz Pastuszka =

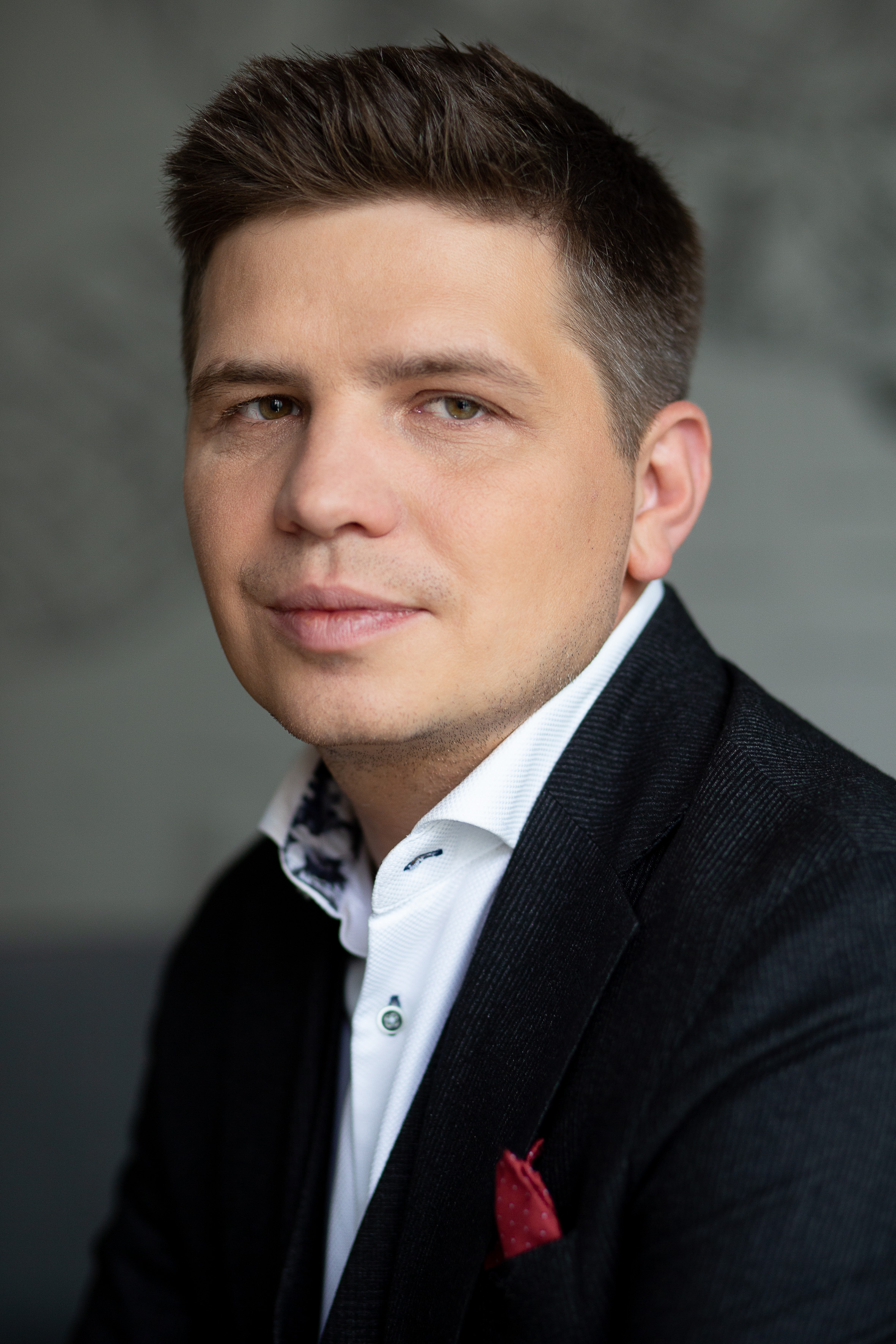
- Pastuszka in 2019
- Born: 14 February 1983; Radom, Poland
- Occupation(s): founder of IBBC Group, and CEO of NaviRisk.

Bartosz Pastuszka (born February 14, 1983, Radom, Poland) is a risk management expert, founder of IBBC Group, and CEO of NaviRisk.

== Early life and education ==
Bartosz Pastuszka was born on February 14, 1983, in Radom, Poland. In 2008, he graduated from the Faculty of Management at the University of Warsaw. In 2014, he also completed the University of Maryland's elite Resilient Leadership program.

== Career ==
In 2007, Pastuszka founded the IBBC Group, a market leader in the field of comprehensive corporate security and risk management in Poland and Central Europe.

Since 2015, he is a guest lecturer at the Faculty of Management at the University of Warsaw, speaking on entrepreneurship and business ethics topics.

In 2016, Pastuszka sold 100 percent of IBBC Group to Pinketon.

Until 2016, Pastuszka was the editor-in-chief of “Business Security Magazine” which he founded in 2011.

During 2016–2017, Pastuszka became the first Pinkerton's director for Central and Eastern Europe. He was responsible for supporting Pinkerton's global clients in Central and Eastern Europe in the areas of security, risk management, crisis management, and the development of the Pinkerton brand in this region of Europe.

In 2018, he founded and became CEO - Managing Partner of NaviRisk, a global network of business risk, intelligence, cybersecurity, and security consulting firms. At NaviRisk, he established CyberPrevent Solutions, a cell dedicated to cybersecurity and the development of dedicated cyber risk services and tools.

In 2019, Pastuszka founded the Eastshield Fund, a partner in the law firm Crisis Legal Solutions. In February of the same year, he became Managing Partner of SecUA, a company specializing in business security services in the Ukrainian market.

Bartosz Pastuszka is a member of Polish Association of Licensed Investigators, ACFE, and ASIS International. Also, he is a licensed private investigator.

He is also in the authorities of the association ASIS International Poland Chapter, in the audit committee.
