= Anastasia Gromoglasova =

Russian pianist

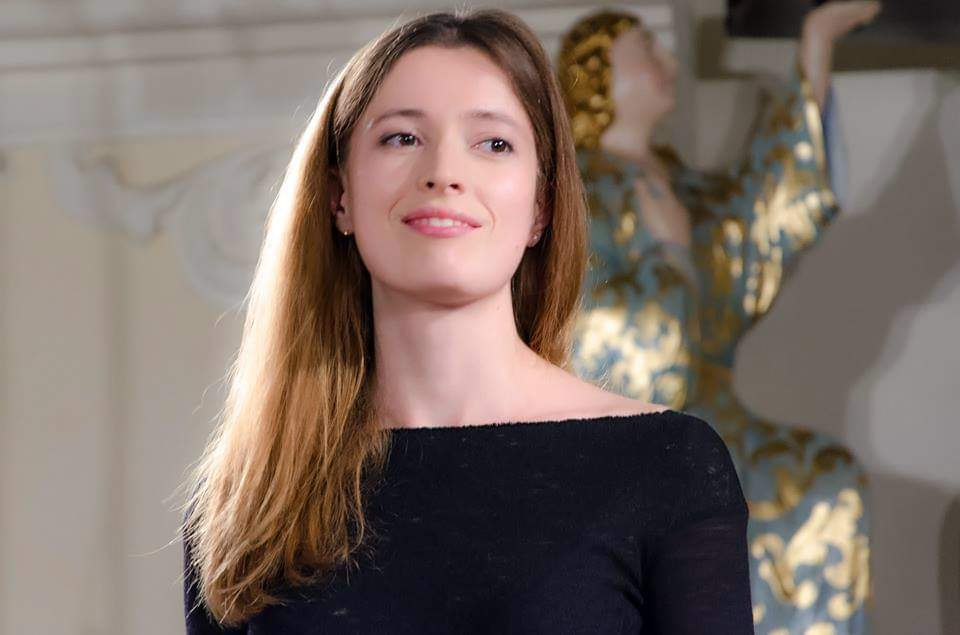
Anastasia Gromoglasova, 2015

Anastasia Gromoglasova (Russian: Анастасия Николаевна Громогласова; born 18 September 1984) is a Russian classical pianist.

== Biography and education ==
Anastasia Gromoglasova is a Russian pianist and a winner of several international awards.

In 1994 Anastasia joined the Moscow Conservatory where she continued her education attending Elena Kuznetsova's piano solo class, Elena Sorokina's chamber music class and Vazha Tchatchava's accompaniment class. Anastasia Gromoglasova has won several awards and prizes in international contests performing both as a solo and in a piano duo, together with her sister Liubov Gromoglasova. Since 2014 Gromoglasova sisters have regularly been invited to perform at the Festival della Valle d'Itria, Italy.

== Awards ==
=== Piano solo ===
Anastasia Gromoglasova has received several international prizes:

In 2007, won her first Piano Competition at the North London Piano Academy.
In 2010, took part in the International Keyboard Institute and Festival in New York City and won the Dorothy C. McKenzie Award.
In 2011, won the first prize at the XI Alexander Scriabin International Piano Competition in Paris.
In 2011, performed as a soloist at the "Rachmaninov hall" of the Moscow Conservatory for the "Yamaha Festival Gradusad Parnassum"
In 2012, won the first prize at the International Piano Competition in Castellana Grotte, Bari
In 2013, debut in Bari performing the Piano Concerto No. 23 (Mozart) K.488 with the symphony orchestra of Bari.

=== Piano duo ===
Anastasia Gromoglasova has been performing as a piano duo with her sister Liubov Gromoglasova, also graduated at Moscow Conservatory, receiving the following awards:

In 2006, 3rd prize in Nikolai Rubinshtein Chamber Music Competition (Moscow)
In 2007, winner of the London International Music Competition.
In 2008, 2nd prize and the special prize at the Schostakovitch Chamber Music and Piano Duo Competition (Moscow) becoming grant-aided students of "Russian Performing Art" foundation;
In 2008, received the diplomas of the 4th International Piano Duos Competition in Bialystok (Poland).
In 2010, the Piano Duo took part in San Marino “Allegro Vivo” International Competition receiving the final diploma.
In 2011, 1st prize in Vologda International Piano Duo Competition.
In 2012, first prize performing as Piano Duo at the International Piano Competition in Castellana Grotte, Bari

Anastasia and Liubov Gromoglasova regularly take part in the abonnement concerts of Moscow Conservatory.

== Repertoire ==
Her repertoire includes works by Bach, Mozart, Haydn, Mendelssohn, Schubert, Brahms, Chopin, Rachmaninov, Scriabin, Schostakovitch, Debussy, Ravel, Lutoslawsky, Bizet, Prokofiev.

== See also ==
- List of classical pianists
