= Anastasia Patsiou =

Greek handball player (born 1977)

Personal information
- Nationality: Greek
- Born: 13 June 1977 (age 49)
- Height: 175 cm (69 in)

Sport
- Sport: Handball
- Position: right back /right wing

Senior clubs
- Years: Team
- 1988-1994: KOZANI
- 1994-1999: VEROIA
- 1999-2001: Filippos Veroia
- 2001-2002: ORMI LOUX
- 2002-2003: Nea Ionia
- 2003-2004: TuS Weibern (Germany)
- 2004-2005: IBV (Iceland)
- 2005-2006: Rocasa Gran Canaria ACE
- 2007-2008: ARIS Thessalonikis
- 2008-2009: Pylaia Thessaloniki
National team
- Years: Team
- 1994-2009: Greece

Anastasia Patsiou (Greek: Αναστασία Πάτσιου, born 13 June 1977) is a Greek handball top player with height 175 cm who competed in the 2004 Summer Olympics. She was the captain of greek national team from 2005 to 2008.
