= Sixteen Tons (club) =

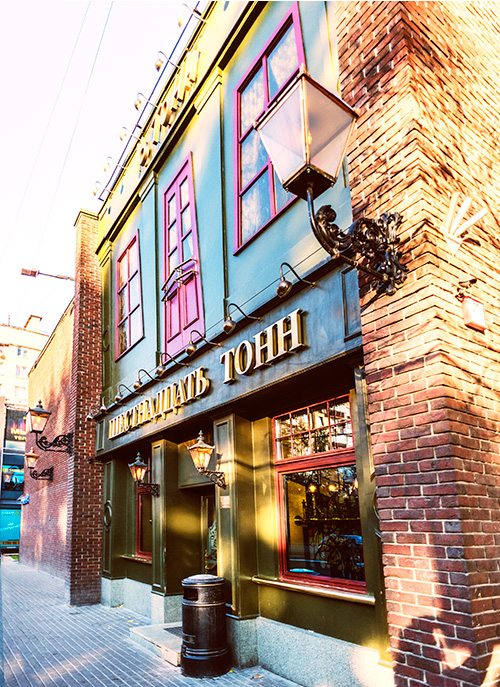
Sixteen Tons

Sixteen Tons (Russian: Шестнадцать тонн) is a musical nightclub, restaurant, and pub in Moscow, Russia.

Established in 1996, the club was named after the song Sixteen Tons. Initially it was opened in the format of a traditional English pub. In 1997 the second floor was added, to function as a nightclub, with musical stage and a dance floor. It is located at 6 unit 1, Presnensky Val (Metro station Ulitsa 1905 Goda).

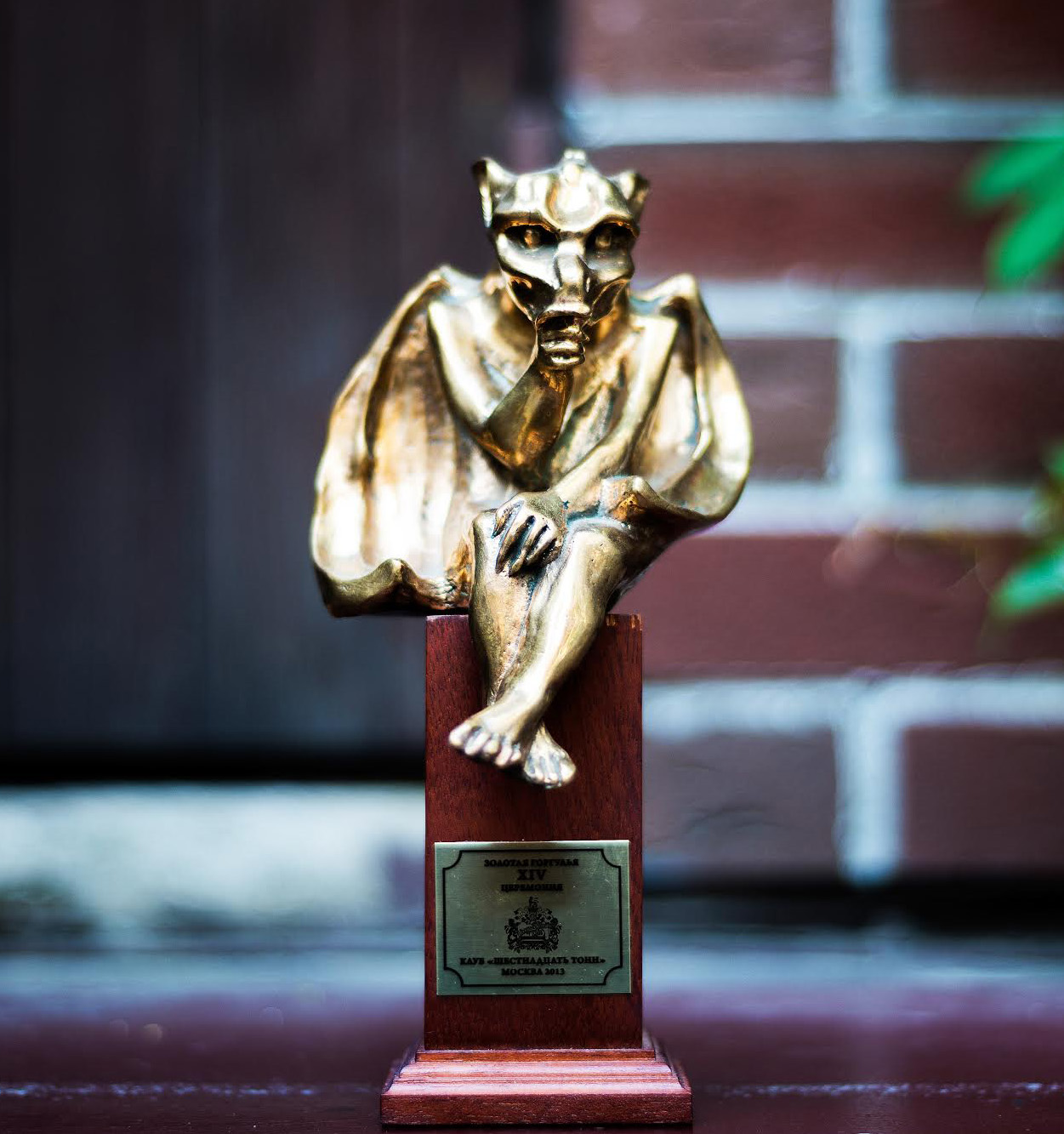
Golden Gargoyle

In 1999 the club established a musical prize, Golden Gargoyle, first awarded in 2000.
