= Anastasia Luppova =

Russian billiards player and coach

Personal information
- Born: June 26, 1985 (age 40); Kazan, Soviet Union

Sport
- Country: Russia
- Sport: Russian billiards

Anastasia Vladimirovna Luppova (Russian: Анастасия Владимировна Луппова; born 26 June 1985 in Kazan) is a Russian billiards player, the two-time European champion in Russian pyramid, the champion of Moscow in dynamic pyramid, and a Russian Master of Sports.

Luppova also won the 2009 Miss Billiards competition. She went on to become a coach.
