= Shabtai Kalmanovich =

KGB spy and Russian businessman

- 'שבתאי קלמנוביץ
- Born: 18 December 1947; Kaunas, Lithuanian SSR, Soviet Union
- Died: 2 November 2009 (aged 61); Moscow, Russia
- Resting place: Segula Cemetery
- Occupations: Businessperson, art collector, promoter, spy
- Penalty: 7 years in prison (reduced to 5)

Shabtai Kalmanovich (Hebrew: שבתאי קלמנוביץ', Lithuanian: Šabtajus Kalmanovičius, Russian: Шабтай Генрихович Калманович; 18 December 1947 – November 2, 2009), alternatively spelled Shabtai Kalmanovic, was a KGB spy, who later became known in Russia as a successful businessman, concert promoter and basketball sponsor.

== Biography ==
Kalmanovich was born in Kaunas, Soviet Lithuania to an impoverished Lithuanian Jewish family in 1947. His mother was a Holocaust survivor who had been sheltered by a Lithuanian family after escaping Nazi captivity in the Ninth Fort. He studied chemical engineering, and joined the Soviet Army soon after his studies. When his commanders learned that his family was planning to emigrate to Israel, he was summoned to the KGB, and was recruited as a spy in exchange for expediting the emigration procedures for himself and his family. In 1971, he emigrated to Israel with his family after they received exit permits.

In Israel, Kalmanovich became active in the Israeli Labor Party, worked in the Government Press Office, and as a parliamentary aide in the Knesset. His government positions gave him access to information about Nativ, an Israeli liaison organization that maintained contact with Jews in the Soviet Union and other Eastern bloc countries. Kalmanovich had been instructed to infiltrate Nativ by his KGB case officer and pass intelligence on its activities. According to his indictment, Kalmanovich handed over information to the Soviets over a period of 17 years. Kalmanovich became a businessman after the KGB funded investments for him in Israel. He became wealthy by exploiting cheap labor in South African bantustan of Bophuthatswana, in conjunction with other Israeli, South African and Taiwanese businessmen. He lived and worked for a time in Sierra Leone, where he made a fortune in the diamond trade and worked as a representative for Israel.

His wealth allowed him to befriend important Israeli figures, including intelligence officers and several generals, including Brigadier-General Dov Tamari, the first Chief Intelligence Officer of the Intelligence Corps, whom he took on an all-expense-paid tour of Africa as a domestic security consultant. He made contact with Knesset members, and hosted cabinet ministers at lavish parties at his villa in a wealthy Tel Aviv neighborhood.

His business ventures began to collapse in the mid-1980s. During a 1987 visit to the United Kingdom, Kalmanovich was arrested by British police for having allegedly passed over $2 million in forged checks to the United States. He was extradited to the United States, only to be released on bail and allowed to return to Israel. Upon his return to Israel, he was arrested and charged with espionage. His frequent trips to the Soviet Union and East Germany had aroused the suspicion of Shin Bet, Israel's internal security agency. Shin Bet had conducted an investigation and discovered evidence that he was passing information to the Soviets. According to one theory, he was only made a scapegoat for information from Jonathan Pollard that had been willingly shared by Israel with the Soviets in order to secure the release of certain Jewish scientists in the USSR.

In 1988, he was sentenced to seven years in prison for spying for the KGB. He was released after five years. Officially, his release was due to good behavior and medical concerns, and that it was also in exchange for the release of 20 Russian Jews who had been imprisoned during the Soviet era after their applications for exit visas were rejected. However, his behavior in prison had been unsatisfactory, and he had even been suspected of bribing the guards. Allegedly, Kalmanovich's business partner, Josef Kobzon, a member of the Russian Duma who had unofficial contacts with Israeli leaders, promised the Israeli government that if Kalmanovich was released, he would work for the resumption of diplomatic relations between Israel and Russia. It has also been alleged that Uri Lubrani, coordinator of Israel's activities in Lebanon, recommended Kalmanovich be released on grounds of failing health, when in fact he was doing a favor for Jamil Sa'idi, a Sierra Leone businessman of Lebanese origin who had close connections with Kalmanovich. As Sa'idi was a distant relative of Nabih Berri, head of the Amal movement, which was holding Israeli pilot Ron Arad captive, there was a hope that freeing Kalmanovich might lead to an arrangement where Arad could be freed. Reportedly, Kalmanovich, while still in prison, arranged a meeting between his lawyer Amnon Zikhroni, a Mossad representative, a Shin Bet representative, and Sa'idi in Paris.

Following his release in 1993, he sponsored an Israeli women's basketball team, and relocated to post-Soviet Russia to further his business career. In Russia, he promoted concerts for stars such as Michael Jackson, José Carreras and Liza Minnelli. Since 1994, Kalmanovich was director general of the large Tishinsky shopping center in Moscow. He also sponsored three basketball clubs (Žalgiris Kaunas of Lithuania, Spartak Moscow and UGMK Yekaterinburg of Russia) and became general manager of the Russia women's national basketball team in 2008. In 1999, when Žalgiris Kaunas became the champions of the EuroLeague, Lithuanian President Valdas Adamkus awarded Kalmanovich with Lithuanian citizenship and the Order of the Lithuanian Grand Duke Gediminas.

Kalmanovich had close connections with all sorts of Russian businessmen, one of whom, Vyacheslav Ivankov, was killed in Moscow on October 9, 2009.

Kalmanovich was a philanthropist. At his funeral, business partner Yossi Priel would say that "he was a warm person, good-hearted, helped a lot of people". His philanthropy included large donations to the Kaunas Synagogue, which was sustained mostly by his financial support.

Kalmanovich was married three times and had two daughters and two sons. His second wife was actress and record producer Anastasia von Kalmanovich, who left him after falling in love with Russian female rock star Zemfira, and Kalmanovich raised their daughter Daniela on his own. His third wife was basketball star Anna Arkhipova.

== 2009 assassination ==
On November 2, 2009, Kalmanovich was assassinated by unknown gunmen in a passing Lada Priora vehicle as he was sitting in his car, a Mercedes S500, in Moscow. Moscow police confirmed that he had been the victim of a professional hit. His assassin had waited for his car to stop at a traffic light before shooting. Kalmanovich was hit 10 times and died immediately. Vladimir Markin, of the investigative committee of Russia's procurator, argued that the event was the result of a "contract-style crime" and that the murder was probably "linked to his business activities".
