= Cherniavsky Trio =

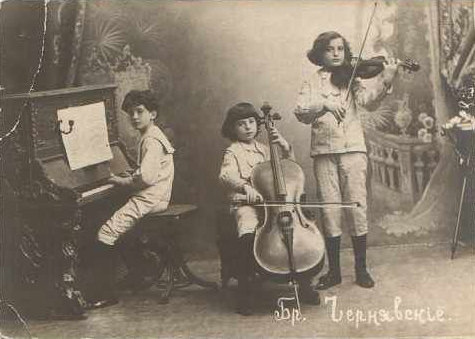
Cherniavsky Trio, before 1906

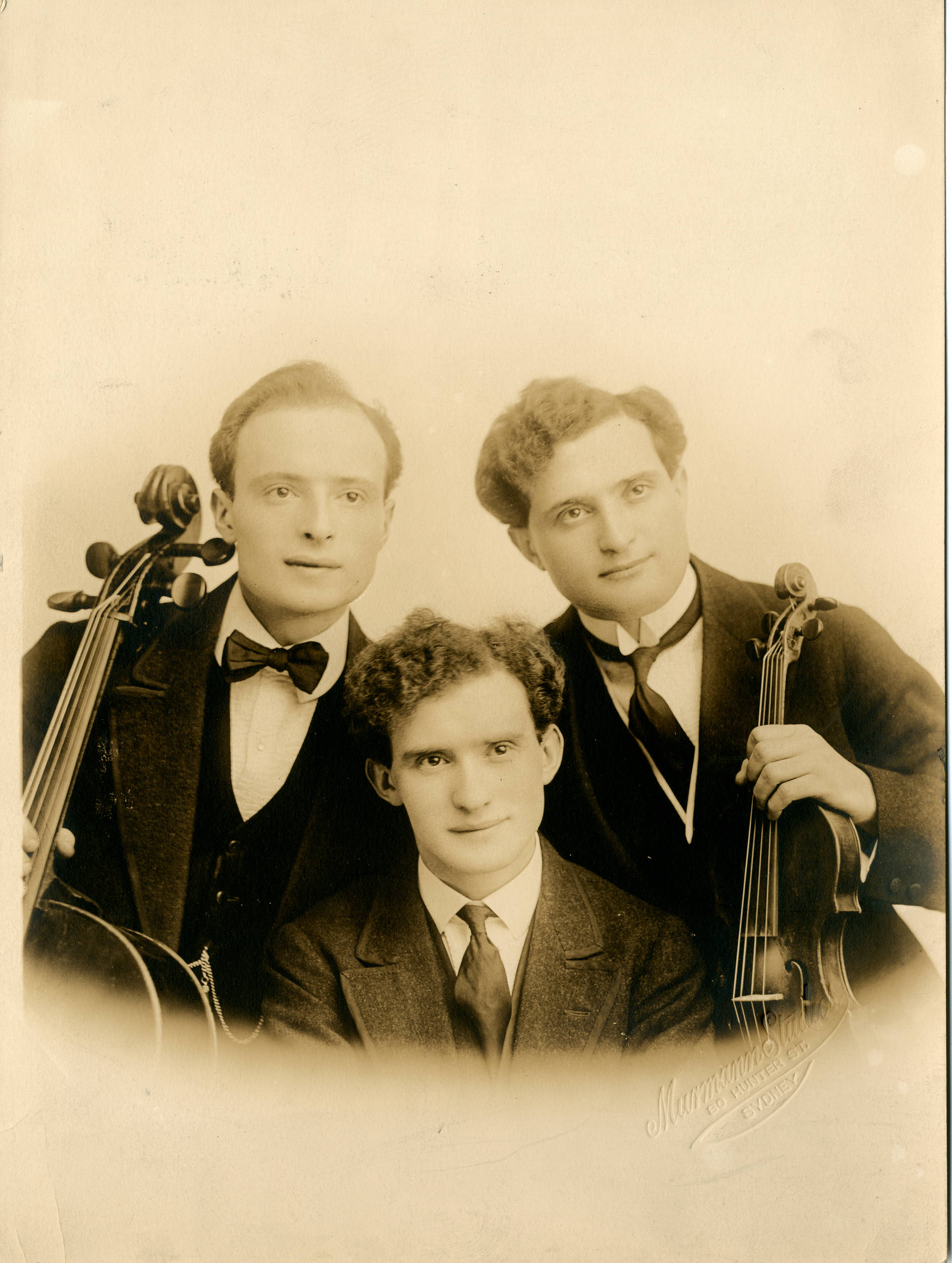
Cherniavsky Trio, 1915

The Cherniavsky Trio was a Canadian musical trio of three brothers, Mischel Cherniavsky (cello), Leo Cherniavsky (violin), and Jan Cherniavsky (piano), sons of Jewish musician scholar and conductor Abraham Cherniavsky from Ukraine. They were part of a family of nine musically gifted children, five brothers and four sisters. Jan and Leo were born in Odesa, while Michel was born in Uman. They were naturalized in Canada on May 1, 1922.

They have toured all over the world, at first as musical child prodigies.
