= Anastasia Powell =

Australian criminologist

Anastasia Powell is a feminist criminologist at RMIT University, Melbourne, Australia.

== Career ==
Powell gained her PhD in criminology from the University of Melbourne in 2008 and has been a director of Our Watch since 2016 (as of May 2022). Her doctoral research was published in the 2010 book Sex, Power and Consent: Youth Culture and the Unwritten Rules by Cambridge University Press. Powell's research specialises in policy and prevention concerning men's violence against women, with a particular focus on sexual violence and technology-facilitated abuse.

She is the author and co-author of several major Australian studies, including Australians' Attitudes to Violence Against Women: Findings from the 2013 National Community Attitudes to Violence Against Women Survey (NCAS) and More than Ready: Bystander Action to Prevent Violence Against Women in the Australian Community with the Victorian Health Promotion Foundation (VicHealth).

Powell is a co-founder of the Gendered Violence and Abuse Research Alliance (GeVARA) at RMIT University, which seeks to promote research development and collaboration in areas including sexual violence, sexual harassment, intimate partner violence, and sex-based discrimination against women.

In addition to her scholarly contributions, Powell is regularly featured in and contributes to Australian news and media outlets, raising the profile of issues including rape culture, sexual assault, domestic violence, 'revenge porn', and sexting.

== Selected bibliography ==
- Powell, Anastasia; Flynn, Asher; and Sugiura, Lisa (eds) (2021). The Palgrave Handbook of Gendered Violence and Technology, Basingstoke: Palgrave Macmillan
- Henry, Nicola; McGlynn, Clare; Flynn, Asher; Johnson, Kelly; Powell, Anastasia; and Scott, Adrian J (2020). Image-Based Sexual Abuse: A Study on the Causes and Consequences of Non-Consensual Nude and Sexual Imagery, London; New York: Routledge.
- Powell, Anastasia; and Liston, Ruth (2020). Public Feminist Criminologies: Reflections on the Activist-Scholar in Violence Against Women Policy. In The Routledge Handbook of Public Criminologies. New York: Routledge.
- Powell, Anastasia; Cameron, Robin and Stratton, Gregory (2018). Digital Criminology: Crime and Justice in Digital Society. Routledge.
- Powell, Anastasia; and Sugiura, Lisa (2018). Resisting rape culture in digital society. In The Routledge International Handbook of Violence Studies (pp. 469-479). New York: Routledge.
- Powell, Anastasia; and Henry, Nicola (2017). Sexual Violence in a Digital Age. Basingstoke: Palgrave Macmillan.
- Powell, Anastasia (2015). ‘Seeking Rape Justice: Formal and informal responses to sexual violence through technosocial counterpublics’, Theoretical Criminology, 19(4), 571-588. doi.org/10.1177/1362480615576271
- Powell, Anastasia; Henry, Nicola; and Flynn, Asher (eds). (2015). Rape Justice: Beyond the Criminal Law. Palgrave Macmillan.
- Henry, Nicola; Powell, Anastasia (September 2014). Preventing Sexual Violence: Interdisciplinary approaches to overcoming a rape culture. Basingstoke, UK: Palgrave Macmillan.
- Powell, Anastasia (2014). Australians' Attitudes to Violence Against Women: Findings from the 2013 National Community Attitudes to Violence Against Women Survey (NCAS). Melbourne: VicHealth.
- VicHealth (2014). "Bystander approaches: Responding to and preventing men's sexual violence against women". Issues Paper, Australian Centre for the Study of Sexual Assault. 17. Institute of Family Studies: 20.
- Henry, Nicola; Powell, Anastasia (2014). "Beyond the 'sext': Technology-facilitated sexual violence and harassment against adult women". Australian and New Zealand Journal of Criminology. 48. Sage: 104–118. doi:10.1177/0004865814524218. S2CID 145262229.
- Powell, Anastasia (2012). More than ready: bystander action to prevent violence against women in the Victorian community. Melbourne: VicHealth. Archived from the original on 15 February 2014.
- Murray, Suellen; Powell, Anastasia (2011). Domestic Violence: Australian Public Policy. Melbourne: Australian Scholarly Publishing. Archived from the original on 25 August 2012.
- Powell, Anastasia (2010). Sex, Power and Consent: Youth Culture and the Unwritten Rules. Melbourne: Cambridge University Press.
- Powell, Anastasia (2010). "Configuring Consent: Emerging Technologies, Unauthorised Images and Sexual Assault". Australian and New Zealand Journal of Criminology. 43 (1). Sage: 76–90. doi:10.1375/acri.43.1.76. S2CID 144393535.
