= Anastasia Ailamaki =

Greek/Swiss computer scientist

- Born: Cyprus
- Education: University of Patras; Technical University of Crete; University of Rochester; University of Wisconsin-Madison
- Scientific career
- Fields: Computer science
- Workplaces: Carnegie Mellon University; École Polytechnique Fédérale de Lausanne
- Website: dias.epfl.ch

Anastasia Ailamaki is a professor of computer science at the École Polytechnique Fédérale de Lausanne (EPFL) in Switzerland, and the director of the Data-Intensive Applications and Systems (DIAS) lab. She is also the co-founder of RAW Labs SA, a Swiss company developing real-time analytics infrastructures for heterogeneous big data. Formerly, she was an associate professor of computer science at the Carnegie Mellon School of Computer Science.

Ailamaki's research interests encompass database systems and applications, with particular emphasis on optimizing database system performance on modern processor architectures and storage technologies.

== Education ==
Ailamaki studied computer science at the University of Patras, and earned her first master's degree at the Technical University of Crete followed by a second diploma from the University of Rochester. She received her PhD in computer science from the University of Wisconsin-Madison in 2000.

== Career ==
She is the recipient of ten Best Paper and Best Demo awards and was awarded Young Investigator Award by the European Science Foundation. In 2013 she received an ERC Consolidator Award for the ViDa: Transforming raw data into information through virtualization project. She is a Fellow of the IEEE and ACM, a member of Academia Europaea, and the Vice Chair of the Special Interest Group of Management of Data (SIGMOD) within the Association for Computing Machinery. She is a member of the Expert Network of the World Economic Forum and CRA-W mentor.

Ailamaki is the author of over 200 peer-reviewed articles published in such journals as the Conference on Innovative Data Systems Research, VLDB, SIGMOD, ACM Transactions on Database Systems.

== Honors and awards ==
- ACM SIGMOD Edgar F. Codd Innovations Award (2019)]: the SIGMOD Edgar F. Codd Innovations Award is given for innovative and highly significant contributions of enduring value to the development, understanding, or use of database systems.
- NEMITSAS Prize 2018 in Computer Science: the President of the Republic of Cyprus, on behalf of the Takis and Louki Nemitsas Foundation, presents the Nemitsas Prize to one laureate for contributions in his/her scientific field which have been recognized at an international level.
- IEEE Fellow (since 01/2018): “For contributions to hardware-conscious database systems and scientific data management”
- ACM Fellow (since 01/2015): “For contributions to the design, implementation, and evaluation of modern database systems”
