= Anastasia Ganias =

American actress

Anastasia F. Ganias
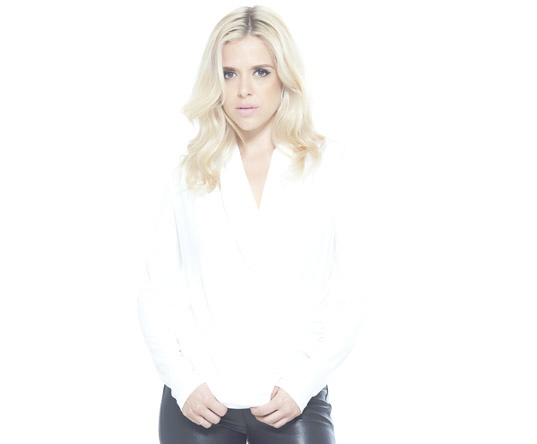
- Years active: 2008-present

Anastasia Ganias is an American actress, best known for her role as Tracy Togs on HBO's True Blood.

== Career ==
Since 2008, Anastasia has been guest starring on shows such as Dexter, Parks and Recreation, Desperate Housewives, Party Down, CSI: Miami, and CSI: New York. One of Ganias’ most notable roles to date was a guest starring role as Megan in the multi camera comedy, According to Jim. Directed by Penny Marshall, Anastasia worked alongside Garry Marshall and Jim Belushi. In film, she starred as Claire in the 2012 award-winning indie comedy Missed Connections, which premiered at the GenArt Film Festival. In 2012, Anastasia was cast as Tracy Togs in the fifth season of True Blood as a recurring character.

== Filmography ==
Team Marco, (2020) Its Freezing Out There (2018)

=== Films ===
Year	Title	Role	Notes
2004	Baby Fat	Paula	
2008	Saint Nick	Lena	Short film
2010	Trophy Wife	Valentina	Short film
2012	Missed Connections	Claire	
2017	2031	Sasha Tay	Short film
2019	Team Marco		

=== Television ===
Year	Series	Role	Episode/Notes
2008	The Game	Asia	"I Got 99 Problems and My Chick Is One"
2008	CSI: Miami	Blonde Co-Ed	"Won't Get Fueled Again"
2008	Dexter	Amber	"Sí Se Puede"
2008	CSI: NY	Jamie Sunderland	"The Triangle"
2009	According to Jim	Megan	"Physical Therapy"
2010	Parks and Recreation	Brandy	"The Master Plan"
2010	Party Down	Danni	Joel Munt's Big Deal Party
2010	Backyard Wedding	Lacey	TV movie
2011	Desperate Housewives	Hostess	"Farewell Letter"
2012	True Blood	Tracy Togs	"Whatever I Am, You Made Me," "Somebody That I Used to Know"
2018	It's Freezing Out There	Book Club Gal	

=== Other credits ===
Year	Title	Role	Notes
2018	A Fine Line	Producer	Documentary film
