= Anastasia Golovashkina =

American political consultant

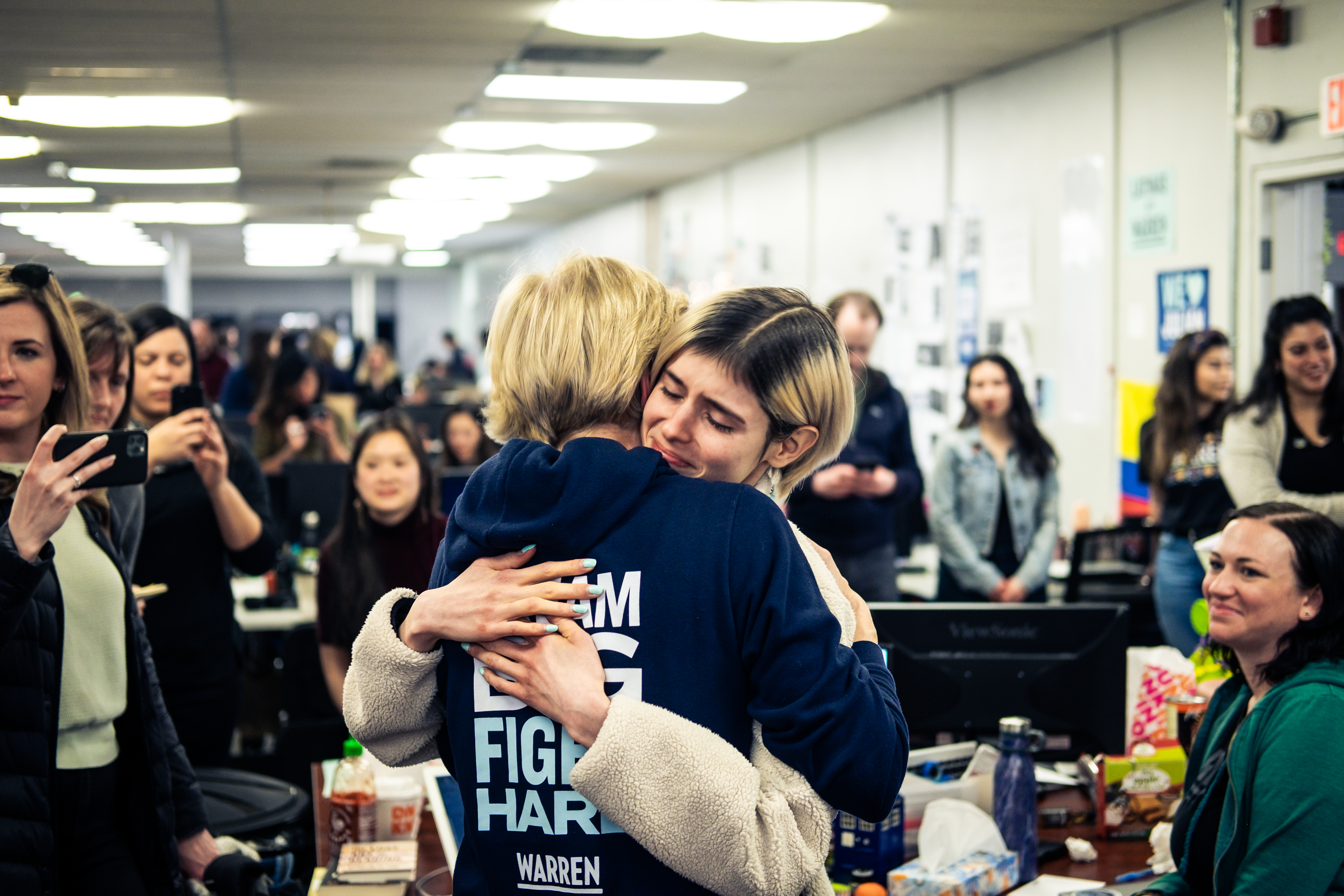
- Golovashkina hugging Elizabeth Warren, 2020
- Born: 24 December 1993; Russia
- Died: 18 July 2022 (aged 28); Chicago, Illinois, U.S.
- Education: University of Chicago
- Political party: Democratic

Anastasia Golovashkina (December 24, 1993 – July 18, 2022) was a Russian–American political consultant who served as the social media director for Elizabeth Warren's 2020 presidential campaign.

During the 2020 Democratic Party presidential primaries, Golovashkina was diagnosed with glioblastoma, a form of brain cancer that would ultimately take her life. Golovashkina continued to work as an advocate for health care reform, increased public funding for medical research, and progressive organizations.

== Early life ==
Golovashkina was born in Russia, and immigrated to the United States with her family at the age of five. She attended Naperville North High School, where she participated in student government and Junior Statesmen of America.

As a student in the University of Chicago class of 2015, Golovashkina was a columnist for the Chicago Maroon and participated in the Institute of Politics.

== Career ==
Golovashkina began working on digital strategy for political campaigns at the political consulting firm 270 Strategies, and later with Trilogy Interactive.

In 2019, Golovashkina was hired as Social Media Director for Elizabeth Warren's campaign for president in the 2020 United States presidential election. Two weeks after she began in this role on the presidential campaign, doctors discovered that Golovashkina had a billiard ball-sized brain tumor, and she was later diagnosed with glioblastoma, a fatal form of brain cancer. While running Warren's social media accounts for the 2020 presidential campaign, Golovashkina undertook a course of treatment that included brain surgery, six weeks of chemoradiation, and six months of chemotherapy.

"In the last 50 years, the United States has gone to the moon, cloned sheep, and synthesized meat. I refuse to believe that we can't cure cancer, too."

— Anastasia Golovashkina, in an Elle op-ed

Following the 2020 Democratic Party presidential primaries, Golovashkina continued working as a political consultant, while advocating for Medicare for All and increased public funding for medical research to treat cancer and rare diseases. After Joe Biden took office as President of the United States in 2021, Golovashkina wrote an op-ed in Elle detailing her experience of diagnosis with glioblastoma and advocating for Biden to restart the Cancer Moonshot initiative.

In addition to advocacy through op-eds and digital organizing, Golovashkina was a speaker at cancer research and healthcare reform activist events, including with Netroots Nation, CancerCon, and Be A Hero. Golovashkina also held digital organizing training for healthcare reform activists, including with the National Brain Tumor Society and Doctors In Politics.

== Personal life ==
Avatar of Elizabeth Warren

Elizabeth Warren
(@ewarren)
tweeted:

Our Team Warren family has lost a bright light—Anastasia Golovashkina passed away this week after a battle with cancer. She was a kind and brilliant member of our team. And, she gave the best hugs. I am heartbroken. Anastasia made our world better every day just by being in it.

July 19, 2022

Golovashkina lived in Berkeley, California and Cambridge, Massachusetts, before returning to Chicago.

In 2022, Golovashkina died at the age of 28, after nearly three years of living with glioblastoma. Memorials and praise for Golovashkina's courage, optimism, and work as a political activist were shared by public figures including Elizabeth Warren, John Fetterman, David Axelrod, Ruthzee Louijeune, and Progressive Change Campaign Committee co-founder Adam Green.
