= Anastasia Muliana =

Indonesian-American mechanical engineer

- Born: Indonesia
- Education: Bandung Institute of Technology (BS); Georgia Institute of Technology (MS, PhD)
- Known for: Nonlinear viscoelasticity, constitutive modeling of composite materials
- Title: Linda & Ralph Schmidt '68 Professor
- Awards: PECASE (2008); NSF CAREER Award (2006); ASME Fellow (2016)
- Scientific career
- Fields: Mechanical engineering, Solid mechanics
- Workplaces: Texas A&M University
- Thesis: Micromechanics and multi-scale constitutive models for the nonlinear viscoelastic analysis of pultruded composite materials and structures (2004)
- Doctoral advisor: Rami M. Haj-Ali

Anastasia Hanifah Muliana is an Indonesian and American mechanical engineer whose research concerns the solid mechanics and viscoelasticity of asphalt, laminates, smart materials, and other composite materials. She is a professor of mechanical engineering at Texas A&M University, where she is also Linda & Ralph Schmidt ‘68 Professor, chair for faculty mentoring and success in mechanical engineering, and faculty ombudsman for the college of engineering.

== Education and career ==
Muliana majored in civil engineering at the Bandung Institute of Technology, graduating in 1997. She went to Georgia Tech for graduate study in engineering, and earned a master's degree in civil engineering there in 1999, but switched to structural engineering and mechanics for her 2004 Ph.D.

She joined Texas A&M as an assistant professor mechanical engineering in 2004, and was tenured as an associate professor in 2010. She was named by the university's college of engineering as a TEES Faculty Fellow and Cain Faculty Fellow in 2016, and was appointed as G. Paul Pepper ’54 Professor in 2017.

== Recognition ==
Muliana was a 2006 winner of the National Science Foundation CAREER Award, and a 2008 winner of the Presidential Early Career Award for Scientists and Engineers. She was named an ASME Fellow in 2016.
