= Mieczysław Czerniawski =

Polish politician (1948–2026)

Member of the Sejm
- In office 19 September 1993 – 18 October 2005
- In office 4 July 1989 – 25 October 1991

Personal details
- Born: Mieczysław Leon Czerniawski; 15 July 1948 Glinne, Poland
- Died: 8 January 2026 (aged 77) Łomża, Poland
- Party: PZPR; SLD
- Education: Higher School of Social Sciences at the Central Committee of the Polish United Workers' Party
- Occupation: Teacher

Mieczysław Leon Czerniawski (15 July 1948 – 8 January 2026) was a Polish politician. A member of the Polish United Workers' Party and the Democratic Left Alliance, he served in the Sejm from 1989 to 1991 and again from 1993 to 2005.

Czerniawski died in Łomża on 8 January 2026, at the age of 77.
