= Anastasia Chebotareva =

Ukrainian musician

Anastasia Chebotareva Анастасія Чеботарьова
- Born: August 8, 1972; Odesa, Ukrainian SSR, Soviet Union
- Genres: Classical
- Occupation: Violinist
- Instrument: Violin

Anastasia Savelievna Chebotareva (Note: Ukrainian: Анастасия Савельевна Чеботарёва, romanized: Anastasiia Saveliivna Chebotarova; Russian: Анастасия Савельевна Чеботарёва, romanized: Anastasiya Savelyevna Chebotaryova) is a Russian violinist. She was born in Odesa and started the violin at the age of five. Three years later, her exceptional talent was discovered by the famous professor Irina Bochkova, who was a student and follower of the legendary Yuri Yankelevich.

Anastasia finished the Moscow Central Music School (eleven classes) at the Moscow Conservatory named after P. I .Tchaikovsky (1996), and graduated from the postgraduate courses at the same institution (1999), consistently following the traditional Russian Method. The creative formation of the young musician was greatly influenced by meetings with outstanding musicians: Yehudi Menuhin, Isaac Stern, Mstislav Rostropovich (lessons and master classes), who distinguished Anastasia's unusual aptitude. Chebotareva was sixteen when she had her international debut with tours in Italy, UK, France and Germany. Anastasia became a soloist of the Moscow State Philharmonic when she was a second-year student of the Moscow Conservatory.

== Artistic works ==
2000 – "Carmen – Fantaisie"; collection of violin miniature masterpieces.

2001 – "Souvenir de Moscou’’; Russian violin music album.

2002 – "Andaluza con passion"; Spanish virtuoso violin music album.

2002 – "Arco"; album of music to a Japanese motion-picture film recorded together with the Japan NHK Symphony Orchestra.

2003 – "Portrait de Fantaisie"; album of French violin music masterpieces.

2003 – P. Tchaikovsky and F. Mendelssohn Concertos with the Russian Symphony Orchestra.

2004 – "Tema D'amore Cinema Collection"; album of music to world-known motion-picture films.

2005 – “Valse de Fleur”; Russian violin music album.

2005 – "Zigeunerweisen ~ Romantic Virtuoso"; album recorded with the Russian Symphony Orchestra.

2007 – "Anastasia Violin Best” (DVD).
