= Tumanny =

Tumanny Туманный
- Urban-type settlement
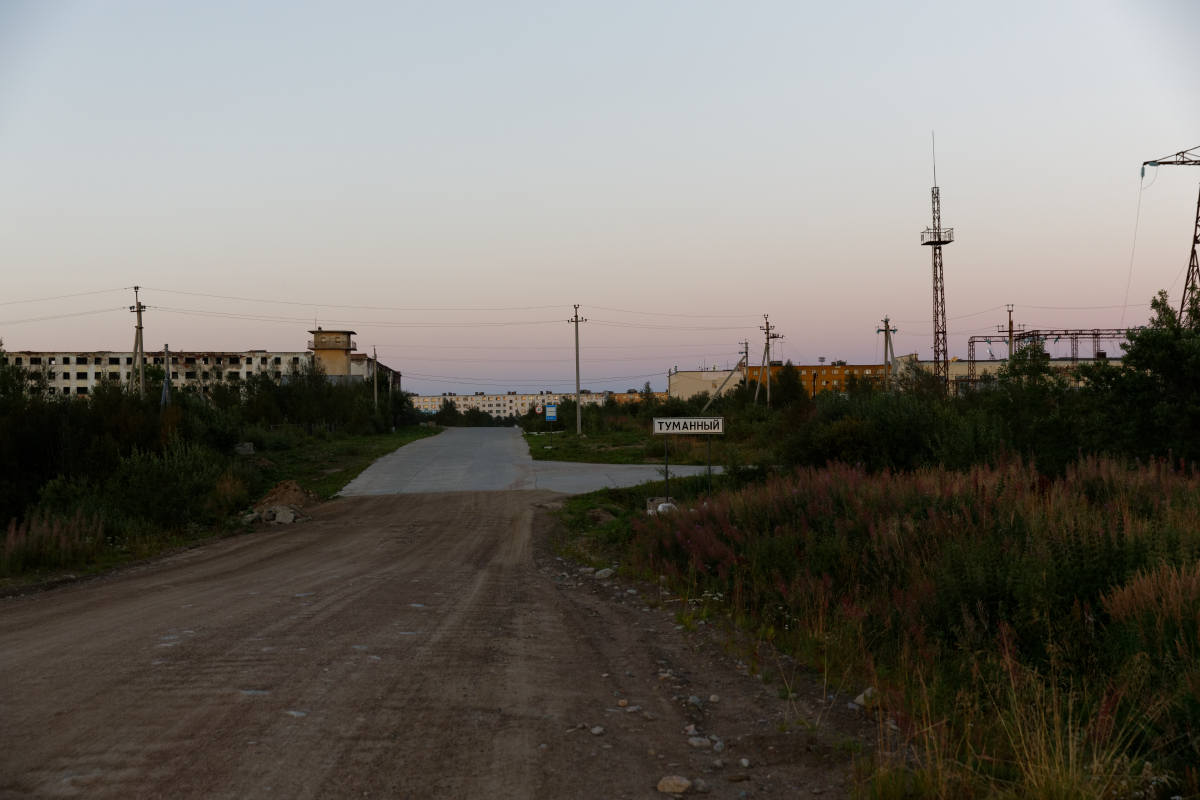
- Panoramic view of Tumanny

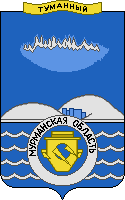
- Coat of arms
- Interactive map of Tumanny
- Location of Tumanny Tumanny (Murmansk Oblast)
- Coordinates: 68°53′03″N 35°41′41″E
- Country: Russia
- Federal subject: Murmansk Oblast
- Administrative district: Kolsky District
- Founded: 1971
- Elevation: 178 m (584 ft)

Population (2010 Census)
  - Total: 685
  - Estimate (2025): 355 (−48.2%)

Municipal status
  - Municipal district: Kolsky Municipal District
  - Urban settlement: Tumanny Urban Settlement
- Time zone: UTC+3 (MSK)
- Postal code: 184375
- Dialing code: +7 81553
- OKTMO ID: 47605173051

Tumanny (Russian: Тума́нный) is an urban locality (an urban-type settlement) in Kolsky District of Murmansk Oblast, Russia, located on the Kola Peninsula on the lower Voronya River, 96 kilometers (60 mi) east of Murmansk. Population: 685 (2010 census); 950 (2002 census); 1,918 (1989 Soviet census).

It was founded as a work settlement around 1975.
