= Anastasia Tsichlas =

South African Football executive

Natasha Tsichlas
- Born: Anastasia Tsichlas; 1943 (age 82–83); Athens, Greece
- Citizenship: Greek; South Africa
- Spouse: Evangelos Tsichlas (died 2025)
- Children: 2

Anastasia "Natasha' Tsichlas is a football administrator and as of January 2025 a Vice-president of the South African Football Association. She has also been a football managing director of Mamelodi Sundowns.

She and her husband Angelo came on the board of the Sundowns in 1988, Anastasia became the managing director, while Angelo became the chairman.

She has been featured in many football magazines and is a personality in football due to both the success of her football team and her reputation as a ruthless manager.

She was a member of the FIFA organizational committee for the arrival, in 2010, of the FIFA World Cup in South Africa, as well as the FIFA Football Committee.

She has been nicknamed the "Iron Lady" by her supporters; this honorable nickname is also due to her relentless efforts to promote women's football in Africa and the world.

== Personal life ==
Tsichlas was married to Evangelos "Angelo" Tsichlas till his death in June 2025. The couple had two sons, Stylianos and Stavros.
