= Anastasia Fomina =

Russian basketball player (born 1983)

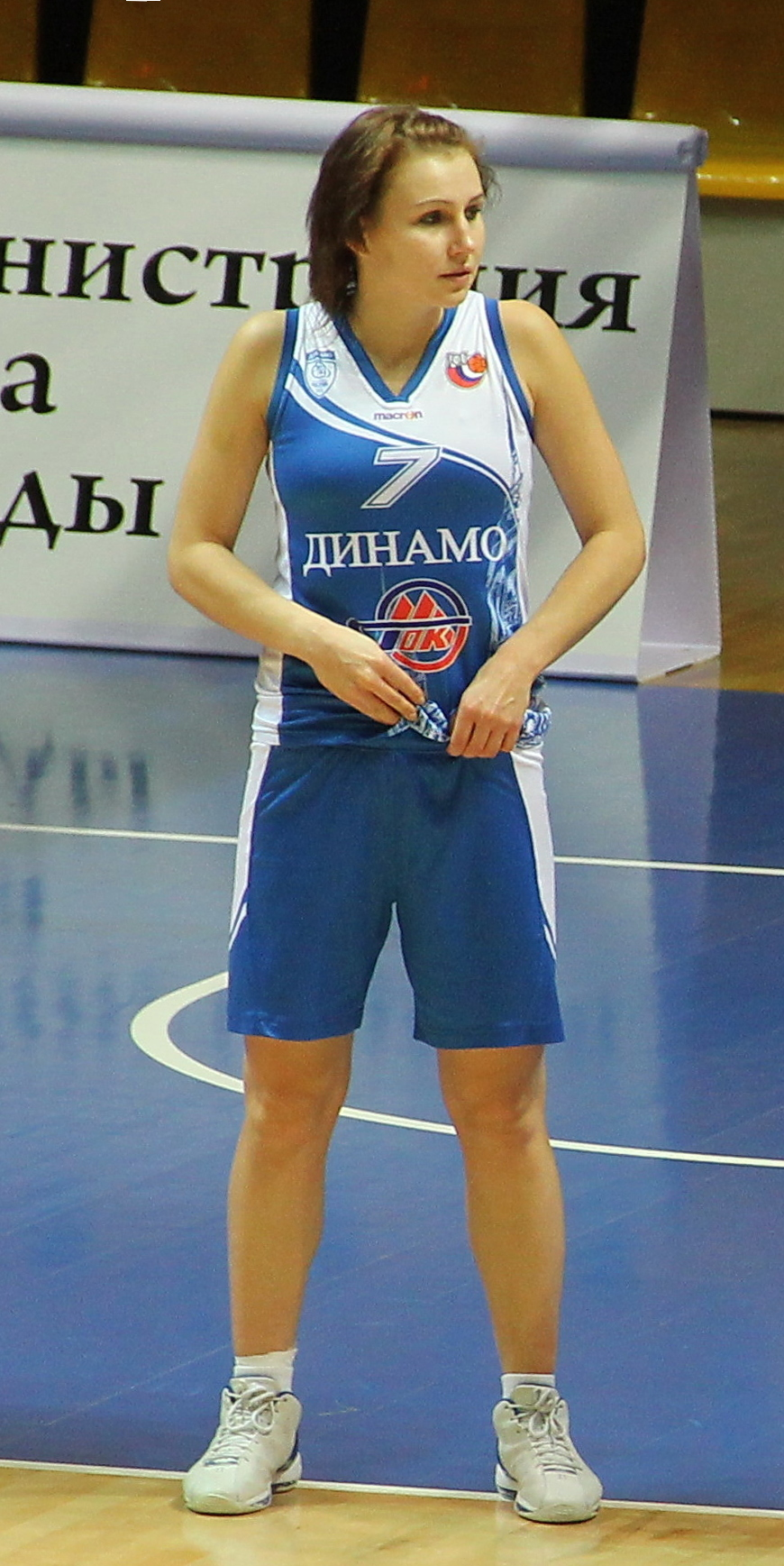
- Fomina in 2012

Personal information
- Born: 5 August 1983 (age 42) Leningrad, Russian SFSR, Soviet Union
- Height: 175 cm (5 ft 9 in)

Sport
- Sport: Basketball
- Club: Baltic Star (1999–00); Volna (2000–03); Baltic Star (2003–06); Dynamo Kursk (2006–12); WBC Spartak Saint Petersburg (2012)

Anastasia Borisovna Fomina (Russian: Анастасия Борисовна Фомина, born 5 August 1983) is a retired Russian basketball point guard. She won the EuroCup in 2004 with Baltic Star and in 2012 with Dynamo Kursk.
