= Anastasia Goryacheva =

Russian soloist of the Bolshoi Ballet

Anastasia Goryacheva (Russian: Анастасия Горячева) is a Russian soloist and ballet mistress of the Bolshoi Ballet.

== Biography ==
Goryacheva was born in Moscow, Russia. In 1998 she graduated from the Moscow Academy of Choreography and the same year became a member of Bolshoi Theatre. In 1999 she played in numerous Vladimir Vasiliev's productions including Giselle and Swan Lake in which she played the Maid of honour. From 2000 to 2003 she played in many Yuri Grigorovich's productions including the role of Neapolitan Bride in Swan Lake and Giselle in a ballet of the same name. In 2009 she player a role of Swanilda in Coppélia and a year prior to it participated in the Alexei Ratmansky's productions such as Flames of Paris where she played a role of Adeline and Zina in the Limpid Stream.

In 2024 Goryacheva retired from the stage. Since 2023 she has been a ballet mistress with the Bolshoi Ballet.
