= Anastasia Golovina =

Moldovan-Bulgarian physician

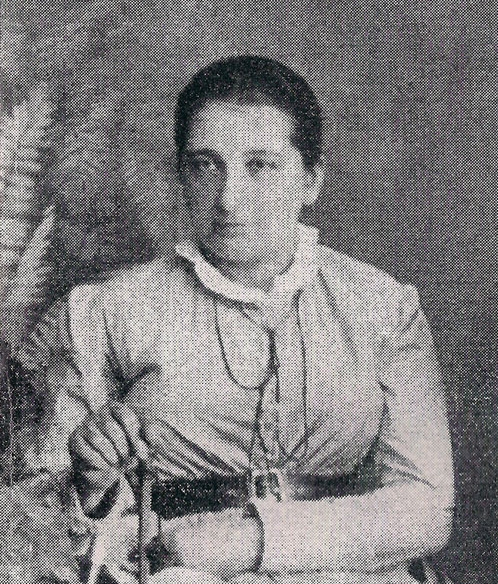
Portrait of Anastasia Golovina in 1885

Anastasia Golovina (Bulgarian: Анастасия Головина), (1850–1933), was the first Bulgarian female doctor and psychiatrist.

== Biography ==
She was born in Chișinău, now part of the Republic of Moldova, on October 17, 1850. The sixteenth child in her family, her parents were immigrants from Kalofer, Bulgaria. Her grandfather, Kalcho Minkov, had moved from Kalofer to Bessarabia in the early 19th century. He volunteered during the Russo-Turkish War of 1828-1829 and served as mayor of Chișinău for nine years.

The early death of her father, coupled with the societal restrictions of the time that limited women's access to higher education, created significant challenges for Anastasia. Nevertheless, she passed the exams to become a private tutor, earned a diploma from a French college in Chișinău, and took a position as a stenographer at the Zemstvo of Chișinău (a local administrative body). Despite these achievements, she continued to strive for the opportunity to pursue higher education.

In 1871, Anastasia Golovina made the decision to go to Zurich, Switzerland, to study medicine. This choice was remarkable, considering the extremely low number of women studying medicine in Europe at the time. Later on, due to her progressive views, the Swiss government expelled her, along with other students, to Russia. Nevertheless, her dedication to medicine brought her to the Sorbonne in Paris, where she continued her studies and graduated in 1876. She later trained at the Cotten hospital in 1877 and the Pitié hospital in 1878. She defended a doctoral thesis titled Histological Study of the Structure of Arterial Walls, which was highly praised by the committee, chaired by Professor Vulpian, and provoked the admiration of the scientist Jean Charcot. This thesis, now held in the archives of the Sorbonne in Paris, remains an important reference.

Prior to her, only five women had earned medical degrees at the Faculty of Medicine in Paris. Anastasia Golovina became the first Bulgarian woman to obtain a university degree and the first female doctor in the country.

After the brutal suppression of the April 1876 uprising, Bulgarian representatives traveled to various countries to raise awareness of the atrocities committed by the Ottoman authorities in Bulgaria. In Paris, Anastasia was deeply moved by the suffering of the Bulgarian people, expressed strong sympathy for their cause, and decided to dedicate her efforts and knowledge to serving the Bulgarian people.

In 1878, she returned to Chișinău, and in 1879, she moved to Bulgaria, where she worked as a municipal doctor in Veliko Tarnovo. The newly liberated country, freed from Ottoman rule, was in desperate need of educated individuals. She introduced several medical innovations, including conducting autopsies to determine causes of death. She also authored numerous scientific and popular medical articles, published in both Bulgarian and international journals. She was a founding member of the Physico-Medical Society, the first medical association in Bulgaria.

While in Veliko Tarnovo, she met Alexandre Golovine, a Russian officer and volunteer during the Russo-Turkish War of 1877-1878, who later became involved in the newly established Bulgarian administration. They married shortly after. Following Bulgaria's liberation, her husband served as the director of the correspondence office in the political cabinet of Prince Battenberg, where Anastasia Golovina also actively contributed.

Subsequently, she worked as a doctor in Sofia, where she was a resident at Alexandrovsk Hospital and also served as a physician at the first girls' high school in the capital. After the overthrow of Prince Alexander Battenberg, the couple left Bulgaria. Dr. Golovina spent two years at the Faculty of Medicine in Zurich.

In 1887, the family returned to Bulgaria and settled in Varna, where Anastasia became the first female doctor at the public hospital. With her expertise, she took charge of the internal department of the State Hospital, helping to assess the advancements in health and hygiene since the country's liberation from Ottoman rule. She also participated in the first scientific initiatives in Varna and played a key role in establishing the Medical Society, which aimed to improve the professional standards of medical teams and sanitary control. In 1889, she was appointed chief municipal doctor, with a primary focus on maintaining cleanliness in courtyards, streets, and public spaces, ensuring hygiene in fish markets and slaughterhouses, and preventing the spread of epidemics.

Later, she became the head of the newly established psychiatric department at the State Hospital. She introduced modern approaches to treating mental health conditions, placing particular emphasis on the therapeutic benefits of the natural environment, especially the sea. This role made her the first Bulgarian psychiatrist and one of the pioneers of balneotherapy and physiotherapy in Bulgaria.

Dr. Golovina also worked for a year in Plovdiv as the director of the first-class hospital before returning to Varna. She was also a founding member of the Bulgarian Red Cross and the Society for the Protection of Children.

Alongside her medical work, Anastasia Golovina contributed to the Balkan Wars and World War I as a doctor in Varna.

She died on March 5, 1933, at the age of 82, in Varna, Bulgaria.
