= Anastasia Lazariuc =

Moldovan singer

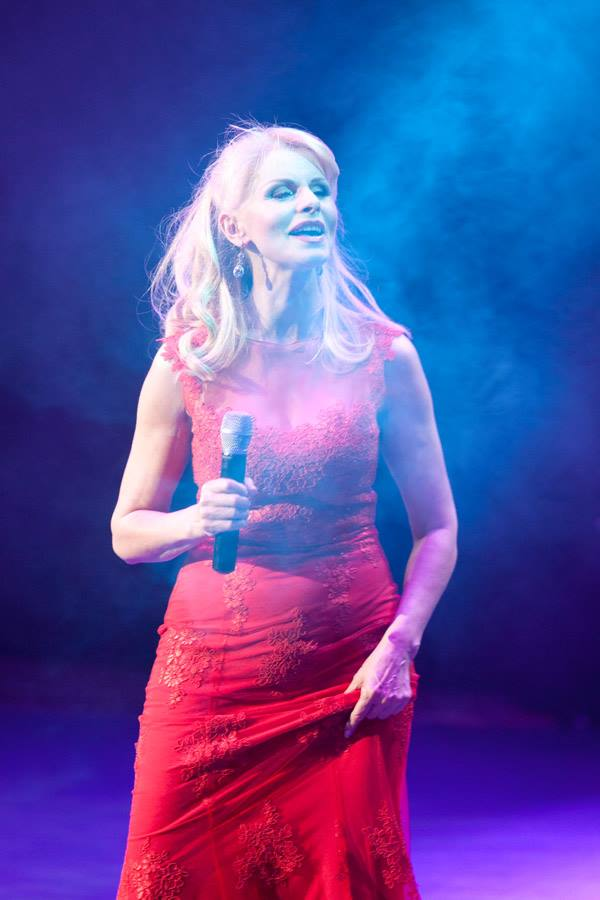
Lazariuc in 2014

Anastasia Lazariuc (born 6 July 1953) is a Moldovan singer.
