= Anastassia Khozissova =

Russian model (born 1979)

- Born: 15 April 1979 (age 45); Saratov, Russia
- Modeling information
- Height: 178 cm (5 ft 10 in)
- Hair color: Blonde
- Eye color: Green
- Website: www.anastassiakhozisova.com

Anastassia Khozissova (Russian: Анастасия Хозисова) (b. 15 April 1979) is a Russian fashion model.

== Career ==
Khozissova entered the modeling world at the age of 18 after graduating from high school. She was first noticed at the Giorgio Armani runway show in Milan, Italy in the Fall Collection of 1999, and was then shot (by Steven Meisel) for the cover of September Italian Vogue in 1999.

Khozissova has done shows for Chanel, Prada, Dior, Chado Ralph Rucci, Alexander McQueen, Dolce & Gabbana, Roberto Cavalli, Louis Vuitton, Marc Jacobs, Lanvin, Donna Karan, Balenciaga, Miu Miu, Donna Karan, Lagerfeld Gallery, Vivienne Westwood, Roberto Cavalli, Ferre, and Ralph Lauren. She has also been the face of Valentino, Chanel, Dior, Karl Lagerfeld, Vivienne Westwood, Ferre and Ralph Lauren.

In 2004, Ralph Lauren approached Khozissova to be one of their main models. She has also appeared in Ralph Lauren campaigns and editorial shoots. On October 14, 2010, Khozissova was invited to attend the Ralph Lauren Receives Key to the City of New York ceremony.

Khozissova together with Alina Cho appeared in American Morning on CNN in a segment about walking in heels.
