= Anastasia Huppmann =

Russian-Austrian pianist

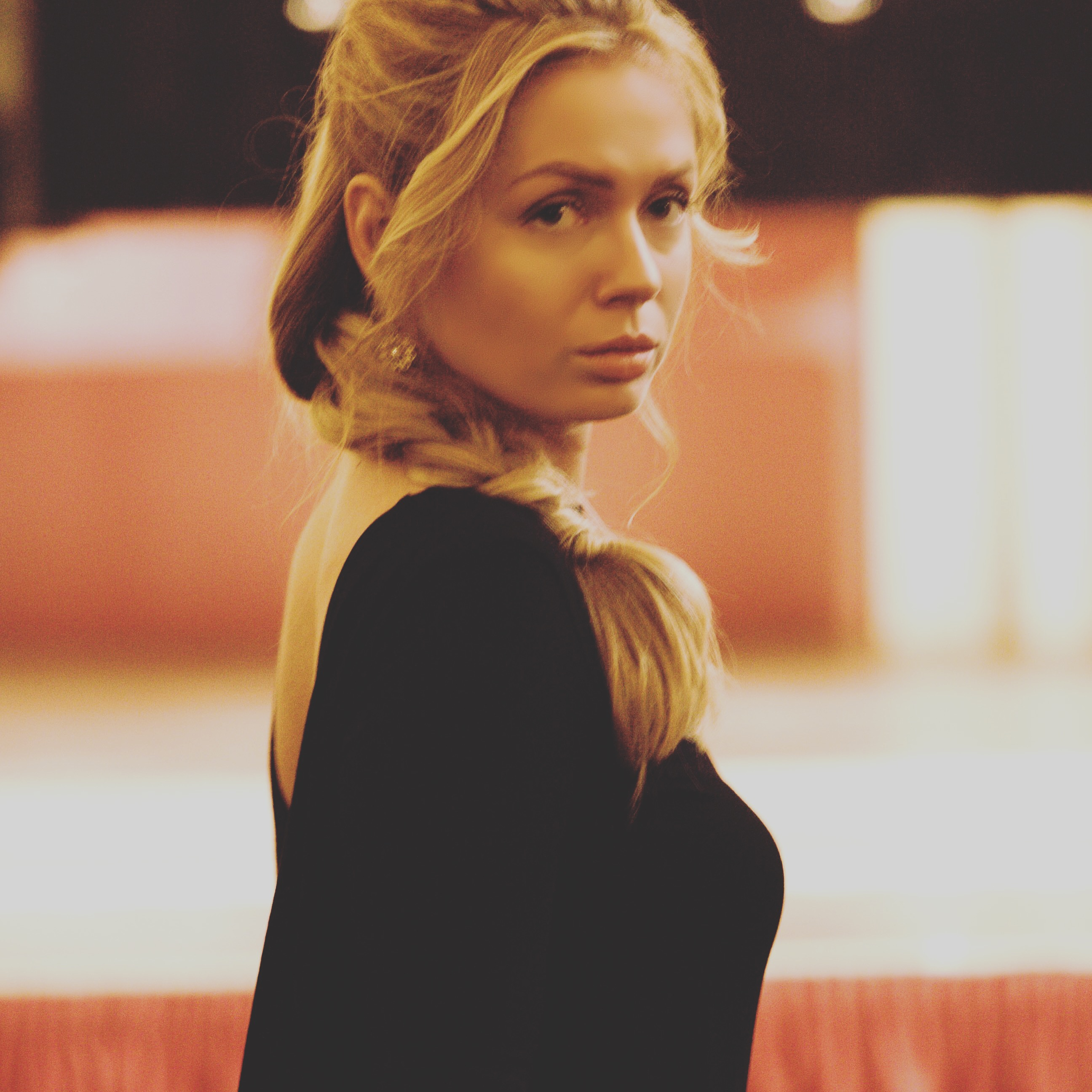
- Born: November 16, 1988; Tver, Russian SFSR
- Occupation: Classical pianist

Anastasia Huppmann (born 16 November 1988) is a Russian-born Austrian concert pianist. Her repertoire includes compositions from solo works of Frédéric Chopin, Franz Liszt, Joseph Haydn, Claude Debussy, Ludwig van Beethoven, the orchestral works of Sergei Prokofiev and Rodion Shchedrin.

== Life ==
Born in Russia, Anastasia Huppmann discovered her love for music early. At the age of five, she started playing the piano. Soon after, the music school board recognised her musical talent and Anastasia began receiving individual lessons for gifted children in piano, composition and music theory. At the age of seven she appeared playing her own music-compositions live on TV and won her first piano competition. When she was eight, she placed third in the Musical College of Norilsk piano competition. She attended the gifted-children program at the University of Smolensk, and later the University of Arts in Saratov. She completed her piano studies at the State Conservatory in Rostov-on-Don (Russia) and at the Vienna Conservatory, both with distinction.

Huppmann continued her education at the Academy of Music in Hannover (Germany). She participated in the solo classes of Prof. Karl-Heinz Kaemmerling until his sudden death.

Huppmann has won more than 20 piano competitions, including the "XXI Century competition" in Kiev (Ukraine), the "Professor Dichler competition" in Vienna (Austria), the "Bluethner special prize" in Vienna (Austria), the "Osaka international Piano Competition" in Osaka (Japan), the International Concorso Pianistico "Vietri sul Mare – Costa Amalfitana" and the Premio di esecuzione Pianistica International "Antonio Napolitano" Citta di Salerno (Italy), the International Piano Competition "Grand Prix International, Jeunes Talents" in Lyon (France).

== Awards ==
Huppmann has received a number of awards in piano competitions, including

- 2005: First Prize – XXI Century competition (Kyiv, Ukraine)
- 2009: First Prize – Professor Dichler competition (Vienna, Austria)
- 2009: Bluethner Special Prize in the framework of the Erika Chary competition (Austria)
- 2009: Third Prize – Osaka International Piano Competition [no first prize awarded] (Japan)
- 2011: First Prize – XI International Concorso Pianistico Vietri sul Mare – Costa Amalfitana (Italy)
- 2011: First Prize – Premio di Esecuzione Pianistica IXth International Antonio Napolitano, Citta di Salerno (Italy)
- 2012: First Place – International Piano Competition 14th Grand Prix International, Jeunes Talents (France)

Solo performances in Ukraine, Russia, Austria, France, Poland, Spain, Italy, and collaboration with national orchestras have led Huppmann to concert halls of Europe and Asia.

== Discography ==
- 2014: Travel through three centuries
- 2016: Chopin / Liszt (Gramola)

She has also published a collection of videos of selected works on her dedicated YouTube channel. Her channel has a large following, with more than a million views on some of the videos.
