= Anastasia Syromyatnikova =

Yakut writer

Anastasia Savvichna Syromyatnikova (Yakut: Анастасия Саввична Сыромятникова, romanized: Anastasiya Savviçna Sıromyatnikova; 24 June 1915 – 16 August 1997) was a Yakut writer.

== Biography ==
Born in Tomponsky District into a poor family, Syromyatnikova graduated from the regional party school in Yakutsk before continuing on to the Maxim Gorky Literature Institute. Her first stories and essays were published in 1938. Her short story collection The Seagull received a prize in 1951; during her career she was also named an Honored Worker of Culture of the Russian Federation. She published a number of novels during her career, writing in the Yakut language. She also write children's stories, and worked as a journalist. Syromyatnikova's work deals with revolutionary topics and subjects involving the military and labor; she also wrote about the changing role of women in Yakut society. She was also active in Yakut literary circles, leading the Khomus literary association for many years.
