= Anastasia von Kalmanovich =

Russian actress and music producer (born 1972)

- Born: Natalya Nikolayevna Brilyova; July 11, 1972 (age 53); Kėdainiai, Lithuanian SSR, USSR
- Occupations: Actress, music producer
- Years active: 2002–present
- Spouse(s): Shabtai Kalmanovich (divorced; 1 child); Fyodr Fomin (2010-present; 1 child)
- Children: Daniella (born 1998); Tikhon (born 2010)
- Parent: Nikolai Brilyov (deceased)

Anastasia von Kalmanovich (Russian: Анастасия фон Калманович; born July 11, 1972) is a Russian actress and music producer.

== Biography ==
Anastasia von Kalmanovich (née Natalia Brilyova) was born in Kėdainiai. Her father Nikolai Petrovich Prilyon died in an airplane crash on December 11, 1988.

== Career ==
She started her acting career in 2002. She worked as an assistant to Otari Kvantrishvili.

She is an ex-record producer of the group Tokio and singer Zemfira.

== Personal life ==
She has two children, daughter Daniella Kalmanovich (born in 1998, whose father is her first husband, businessman Shabtai Kalmanovich who was killed in 2009) and son Tikhon Fomin (born on February 11, 2010; whose father is her second husband, DJ Fyodr Fomin).

Currently lives with his family mainly in Jurmala.
