= Emirates American Football League =

The Emirates American Football League is an amateur American football league based in the United Arab Emirates.

== History ==
Founded in 2011 by Dustin Cherniawski, James Babb and couple Patrick Campos and Julie Teperow from the now defunct American Football Academy in Dubai, the organization promoted itself as a channel of American Football in the U.A.E by "providing a safe and structured environment where players from ages 8 and up can engage in full contact American Football."

It is currently the only organization supporting and promoting American football in the U.A.E. It conducts training and conditions sessions for players but also hosts an annual tournament called the 'Desert Bowl'.

== Desert Bowl ==
The Desert Bowl is the annual American football tournament held by the league. In a regular season, various teams regularly play matches against each other. Following the conclusion of the regular season, the teams play against each other in a single-elimination playoffs tournament called the Desert Bowl.

== Teams ==
The EAFL consists of 7 active teams;

1. Dubai Stallions
2. Dubai Barracudas
3. Al Ain Desert Foxes
4. Abu Dhabi Capitals
5. Abu Dhabi Scorpions
6. Dubai Sand Vipers
7. Abu Dhabi Wildcats

== Venues ==
Matches for the league are played at various venues, spread across the U.A.E; past and current venues include :

1. Dubai Sevens
2. Dubai Sports City
3. Zayed Sports City

Practices for the league have been held primarily at Dubai American Academy for the 2017–2018 season.

== 49ers Collab ==
The San Francisco 49ers were the first NFL franchise to activate in the United Arab Emirates (UAE). Awarded international marketing and commercial rights, the team is driving fan engagement and youth athletics by launching flag football programs across UAE schools in preparation for the sport's Olympic inclusion. And the first under the NFL International Series.

=== NEXTGEN Flag Football ===
The 49ers launched the NextGen Flag Football program across UAE schools to help students develop teamwork, confidence, and athletic skills.

School Integration: The program is integrated directly into the physical education (PE) curriculum and after-school programs of select schools, starting with GEMS Education.Support System: Participating schools receive specialist equipment, tailored coaching resources, and teacher training to facilitate the sport Gulf News.

Official Partner: The initiative is heavily backed by Cisco, which serves as the 49ers' first international partner in the UAE.

Olympics Alignment: The program's launch aligns with the global growth of the sport, specifically in the lead-up to flag football's inclusion in the Summer Olympics.

=== Dubai Clinics ===
The team has hosted numerous youth flag football clinics and coaching sessions in Dubai (such as at the GEMS World Academy) to prepare young athletes for the sport's inclusion in the 2028 Summer Olympics.

=== Foundation Workshops ===
The 49ers Foundation frequently hosts coaching workshops and community events that bring their NFL coaching expertise directly to students in the region.
