= Anastasia Yendiki =

American academic

Anastasia Yendiki is an American academic and neuroscientist. She is an associate professor at Harvard Medical School, and the director of Circuit Analysis Laboratory for Computational Neuroimaging at the Athinoula A. Martinos Center at Massachusetts General Hospital.

== Career ==
Yendiki received her Ph.D. in electrical engineering from the University of Michigan, Ann Arbor. She is principal investigator on an US$23 Mio. grant of the NIH BRAIN initiative. She was keynote speaker at the Organization for Human Brain Mapping annual conference 2022 in Glasgow.

Yendiki has authored numerous peer-reviewed publications on neuroimaging methods and has contributed to the open-source software tools utilized in the field.
