= Anastasia Bardina =

Russian musician (born 1962)

Anastasia Bardina (Russian: Анастасия Бардина; born 14 February 1962) is a Russian classical guitarist and graduate of the Russian Academy of Music.

Bardina was born in Moscow. She is the only virtuoso guitarist in Russia who plays both the seven-string Russian guitar and the six-string Classical guitar. She also plays the twelve-string GRAN Guitar (Guitar Russian Acoustically New) which is similar to a Classical guitar but has six light steel strings and six nylon strings with the steel strings lower in relation to the soundboard.

== Recordings ==
GRAN-d Surprise 1996 Album
