= Anastasia Chernyavsky =

Russian-born photographer

Anastasia Chernyavsky is a Russian-born photographer, who currently resides in the San Francisco Bay area, California.

== Life and work ==
Chernyavsky was born in Kazan, Russia. Her first photographic equipment was a Zenit E camera her father gave her as a gift when she was 15 years old.

She is a freelance photographer for agencies, magazines or private clients, having worked as a professional photographer for civil events.

She became famous in 2013 when her series of self-portraits, featuring her and her children naked, went viral in social media and the blogosphere, and were subsequently censored by Facebook, with some commentators from the mainstream press comparing her compositions to neoclassical paintings, such as the "Madonna del Parto" of Piero della Francesca.

Chernyavsky currently resides in the San Francisco Bay area, with her husband and their three children. She often uses for her work the pen name Styush.

== See also ==
- Nude photography
