= Lady Anastasia (disambiguation) =

Lady Anastasia is a superyacht.

Lady Anastasia may also refer to:

== People ==
- Lady Anastasia Jessey Guthrie Gascoigne of St. Petersburg (1782–1855), wife of Charles Gascoigne and daughter of Matthew Guthrie, paramour to George Glasse
- Lady Anastasia Holman (17th century), daughter of William Howard, 1st Viscount Stafford
- Anastasia de Torby (1892–1977), Lady Anastasia (Zia) Michaelovna Wernher, CBE

== Other uses ==
- Lady Anastasia, a fictional character from the TV series The Great
- Lady Anastasia, a winner of the English Greyhound Derby Invitation

== See also ==
- Anastasia (given name)
- Anastasia (surname)
- Anastasia (disambiguation)
- Princess Anastasia (disambiguation)
- Anastasia of Russia (disambiguation)
- Anastasia Romanova (disambiguation)
