= Anastatia =

Anastatia may refer to:

== Given name ==
- A variant of the given name Anastasia
- Anastatia Mayers (born circa 2005), Antigua and Barbuda citizen, first of a mother-daughter pair to reach space, first Caribbean woman to reach space, in an August 2023 Virgin Galactic suborbital tourist flight
- Kathleen Anastatia Mylne, OBE, elevated at the 1959 Birthday Honours

== Surname ==
- A variant of the surname Anastasia (surname)
- Bryan Anastatia (born 1992), Netherlands soccer player

== Fictional characters ==
Given name

- Anastatia Bates, a P.G.Wodehouse character in "The Purification of Rodney Spelvin" from The Heart of a Goof
- Anastatia Spelvin, a P.G.Wodehouse character in "Rodney Has a Relapse" from Nothing Serious (short story collection)

== See also ==
- Anastacia (disambiguation)
- Anastasia (disambiguation)
