= Alexandrine of Mecklenburg-Schwerin =

Queen of Denmark (1912–1947) and Iceland (1918–1944)

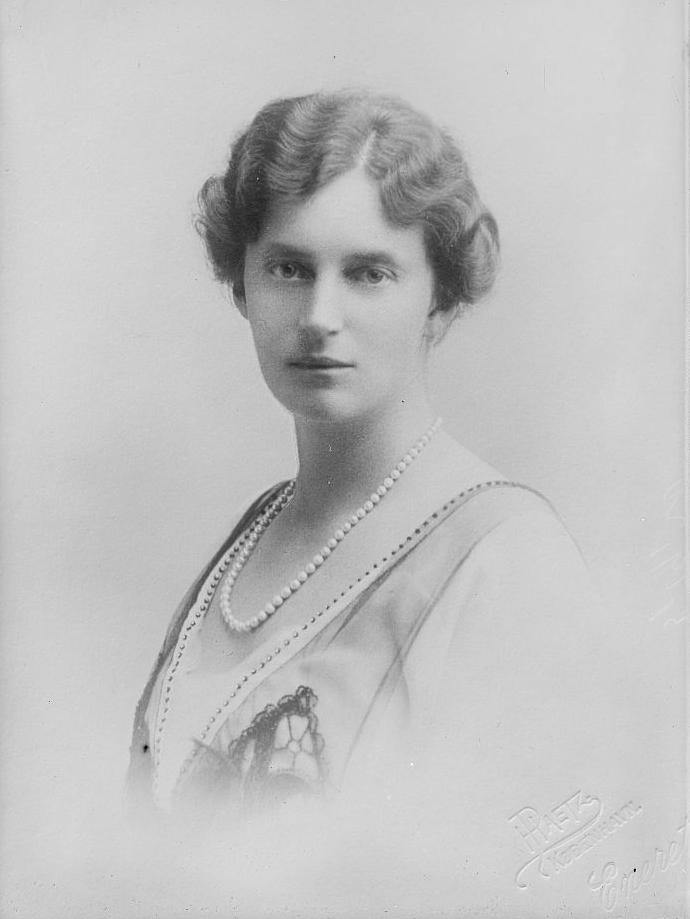

Queen consort of Denmark
- Tenure: 14 May 1912 – 20 April 1947

Queen consort of Iceland
- Tenure: 1 December 1918 – 17 June 1944
- Born: 24 December 1879; Neustadt Palace, Schwerin, Grand Duchy of Mecklenburg-Schwerin, German Empire
- Died: 28 December 1952 (aged 73); Copenhagen, Denmark
- Burial: Roskilde Cathedral
- Spouse: Christian X of Denmark (m. 1898; died 1947)
- Issue: Frederik IX; Knud, Hereditary Prince of Denmark
Names
- Alexandrine Auguste
- House: Mecklenburg-Schwerin
- Father: Frederick Francis III, Grand Duke of Mecklenburg-Schwerin
- Mother: Grand Duchess Anastasia Mikhailovna of Russia

Alexandrine of Mecklenburg-Schwerin (Note: In Iceland her name was officially Alexandrína) (Alexandrine Auguste; 24 December 1879 – 28 December 1952) was Queen of Denmark from 1912 to 1947, as well as Queen of Iceland from 1918 to 1944 as the wife of King Christian X.

Alexandrine was the daughter of Frederick Francis III, Grand Duke of Mecklenburg-Schwerin, and Grand Duchess Anastasia Mikhailovna of Russia. She was brought up with simplicity, and her early life was peripatetic, spending summers in Mecklenburg and the rest of the year in the south of France. She married Prince Christian of Denmark in 1898.

Alexandrine became crown princess in 1906 and queen consort of Denmark in 1912. She is not considered to have played any political role, but is described as being intelligent and a loyal support to her spouse. In spite of her German background, she was loyal to her new country and stood by her husband during the German occupation of Denmark during World War II.

== Early life ==
=== Birth and family ===
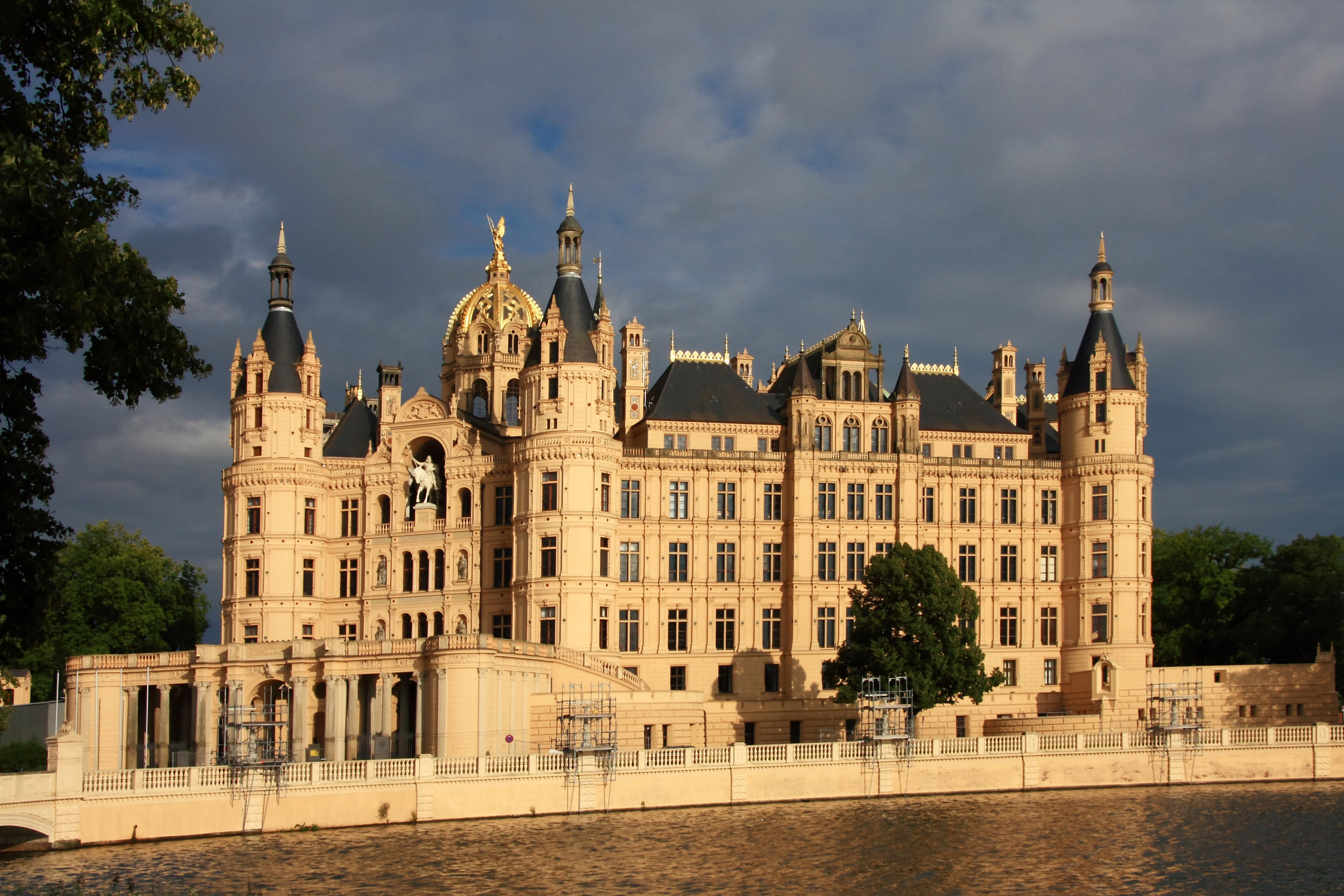
The childhood home of Duchess Alexandrine, the castle in Schwerin in Northern Germany

Alexandrine was born a Duchess of Mecklenburg-Schwerin on Christmas Eve of 1879, in the city of Schwerin, the capital of the vast Grand Duchy of Mecklenburg-Schwerin in Northern Germany. Her father was Frederick Francis, Hereditary Grand Duke of Mecklenburg-Schwerin; who was the eldest son of and heir to the reigning Grand Duke Frederick Francis II. Her mother was Grand Duchess Anastasia Mikhailovna of Russia, who was a granddaughter of Emperor Nicholas I of Russia. Alexandrine was her parents' first child, and was born eleven months after their wedding in St. Petersburg. She was born in the Neustadt Palace (New Town Palace) (Note: Also known at the time as the Erbgroßherzogpalais (Hereditary Grand Duke's Palace).) in Schwerin, which was her parents' residence in the city at the time.

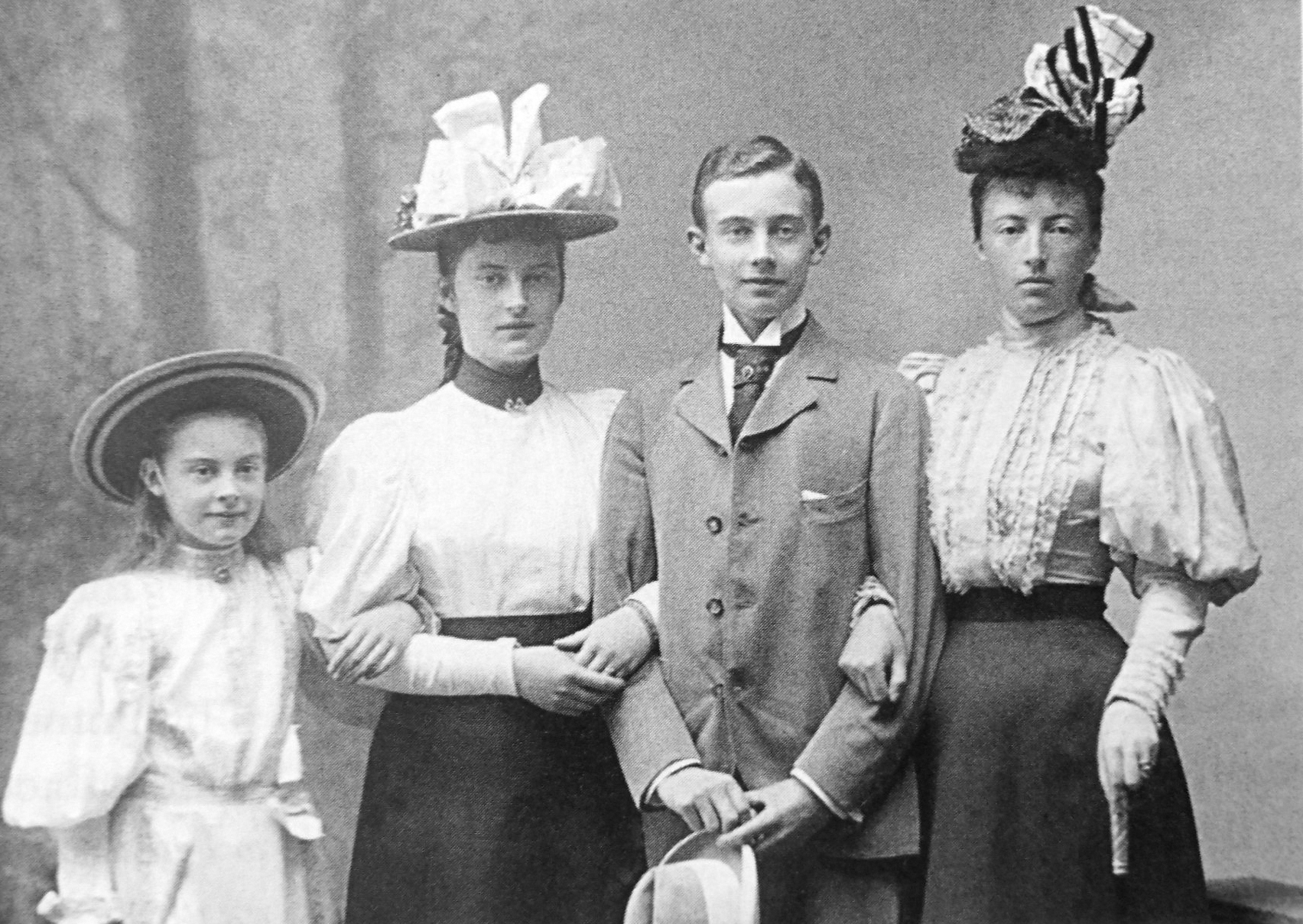
Cecilie, Alexandrine and Friedrich Franz of Mecklenburg-Schwerin with their mother Grand Duchess Anastasia.

Duchess Alexandrine had two younger siblings: her only brother was Duke Frederick Francis, who in 1897 succeeded their father as Grand Duke of Mecklenburg-Schwerin, and her only sister was Duchess Cecilie, who in 1906 married the German Crown Prince Wilhelm of Prussia, eldest son of German Emperor William II. She was also a paternal first cousin of Juliana of the Netherlands. Her mother was the paternal aunt of Princess Irina Alexandrovna of Russia, the wife of Felix Yusupov, one of the murderers of Rasputin.

=== Childhood and early adulthood ===
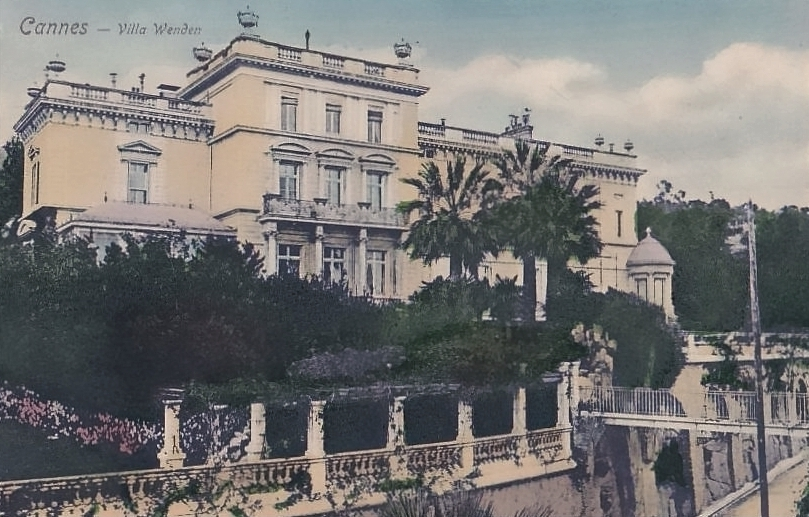
Villa Wenden in Cannes, photographed in 1900.

After their father's succession as Grand Duke upon the death of his father on 15 April 1883, Alexandrine grew up with her brother and sister at the Castle in Schwerin, at the royal residences of Ludwigslust Palace and the Gelbensande hunting lodge, only a few kilometres from the Baltic Sea coast. Her father had a fragile health and suffered badly from dermatitis, asthma and respiratory disorders from an early age. The wet, damp, and cold Northern European climate of Mecklenburg was not good for his health, and as a result, Alexandrine spent a large amount of time with her family away from Mecklenburg, by the Lake Geneva, and in Palermo, Baden-Baden and Cannes in the south of France, where the family owned a large estate, the Villa Wenden. Cannes was favoured at the time by European royalty, including some whom Alexandrine personally met, such as Empress Eugénie of France and her future husband's uncle, Edward VII of the United Kingdom.

== First years in Denmark ==
=== Engagement and marriage ===
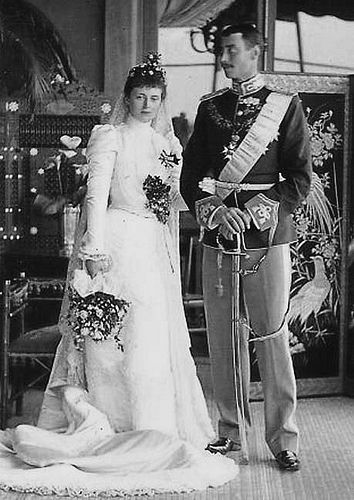
Alexandrine on her wedding day in the Villa Wenden, Cannes

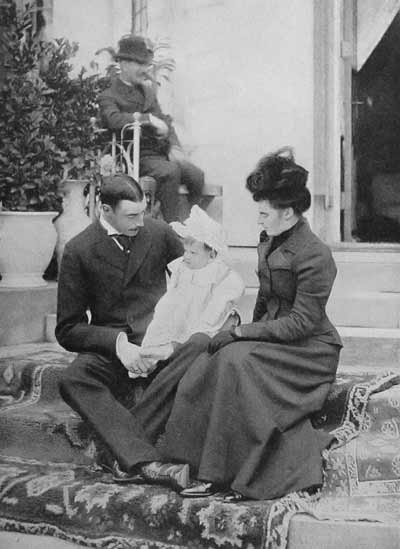
Princess Alexandrine and Prince Christian with their eldest son Prince Frederik in 1900

It was also in Cannes during the winter visit of 1897 that Duchess Alexandrine met her future husband, Prince Christian of Denmark, the eldest son of Crown Prince Frederik and Crown Princess Louise of Denmark. The two young royals were engaged in Schwerin on 24 March 1897. In April 1897, shortly after the engagement was announced, her father the Grand Duke died suddenly at the age of just 46 years. His sudden death was somewhat shrouded in mystery as it was first reported that he had committed suicide by throwing himself off a bridge. However, according to the official report, he died in his garden when he fell over a low wall during a bout of shortness of breath.

The wedding of Duchess Alexandrine and Prince Christian was celebrated on 26 April 1898 in Cannes, when she was 18 years old. They had two children:

- Prince Frederik (1899–1972), later King Frederik IX of Denmark; married Princess Ingrid of Sweden
- Prince Knud (1900–1976), later Knud, Hereditary Prince of Denmark; married Princess Caroline-Mathilde of Denmark

=== Early years in Denmark ===
Upon their arrival in Denmark, the couple were given Christian VIII's Palace (Note: Also known as Levetzau's Palace.) at the Amalienborg palace complex in central Copenhagen as their principal residence and Sorgenfri Palace in Kongens Lyngby north of Copenhagen as a summer residence. Furthermore, the couple received Marselisborg Palace in Aarhus in Jutland as a wedding present from the people of Denmark in 1902, the garden of which was to become one of her greatest interests. In 1914, the King and Queen also built the villa Klitgården in Skagen in Northern Jutland.

On 29 January 1906, her husband's grandfather King Christian IX died, and Christian's father ascended the throne as King Frederik VIII. Christian himself became crown prince, and Alexandrine became crown princess.

== Queen of Denmark ==
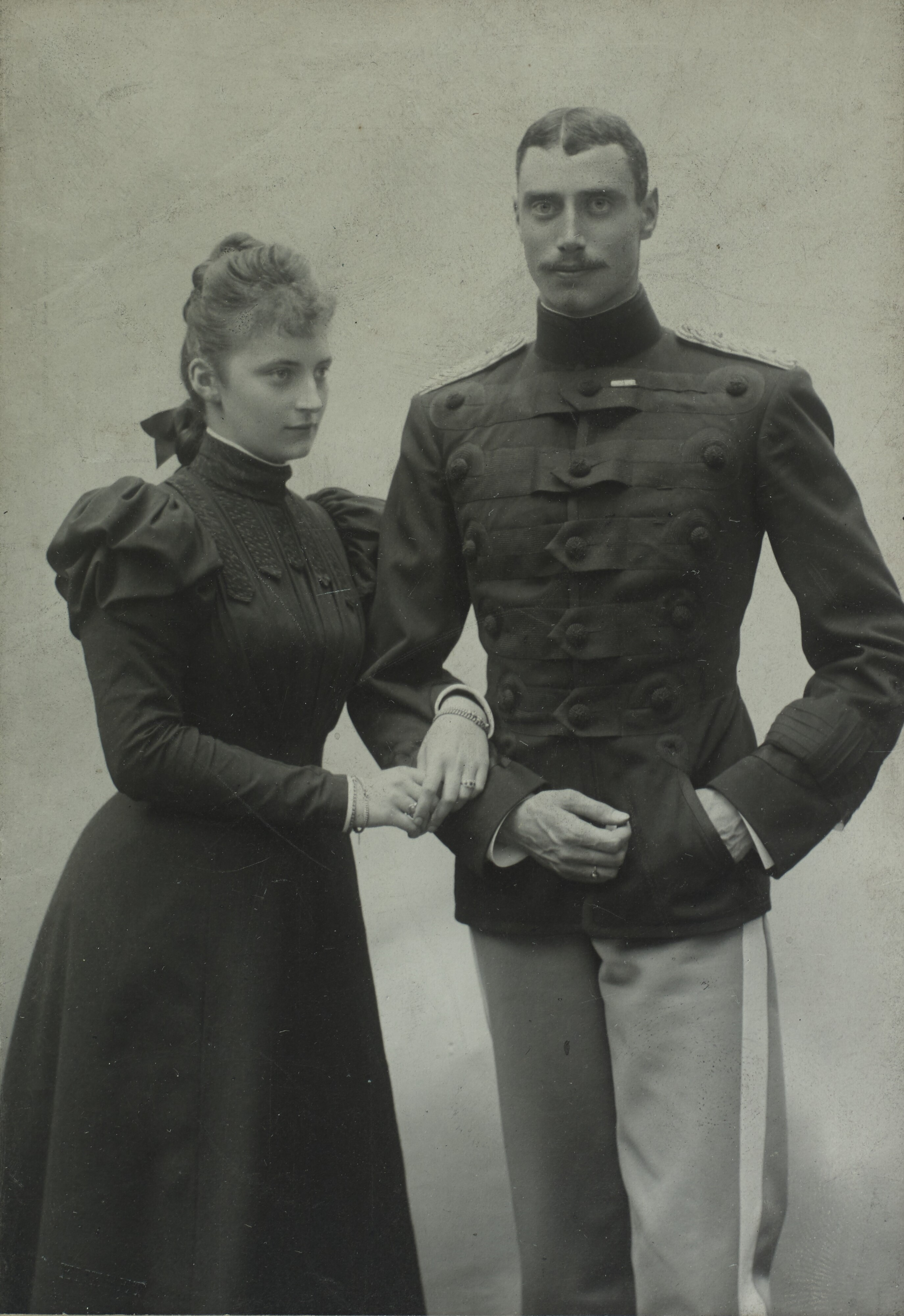
King Christian X and Queen Alexandrine, 1897.

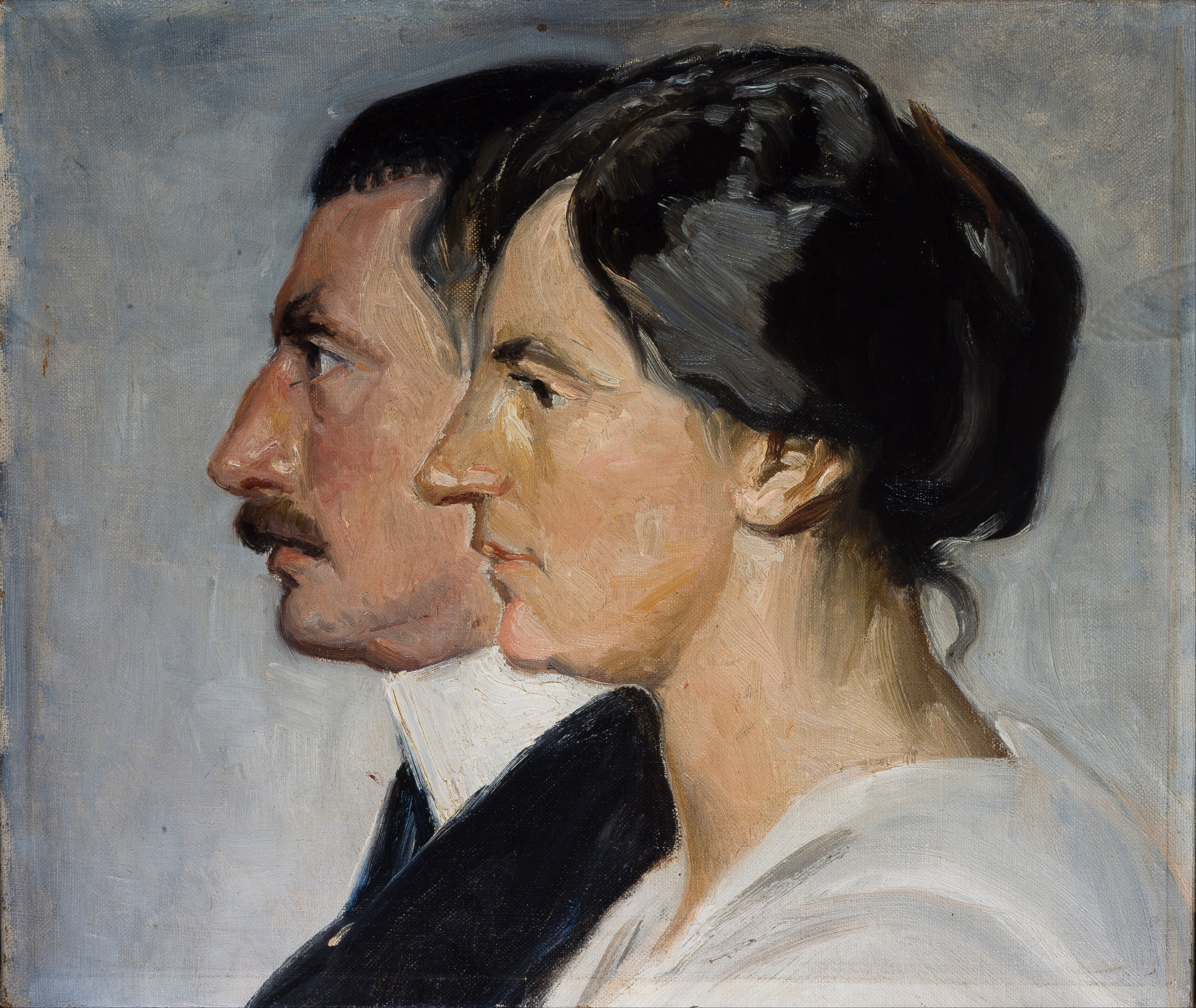
Portrait of King Christian X and Queen Alexandrine by Michael Ancher, 1915.

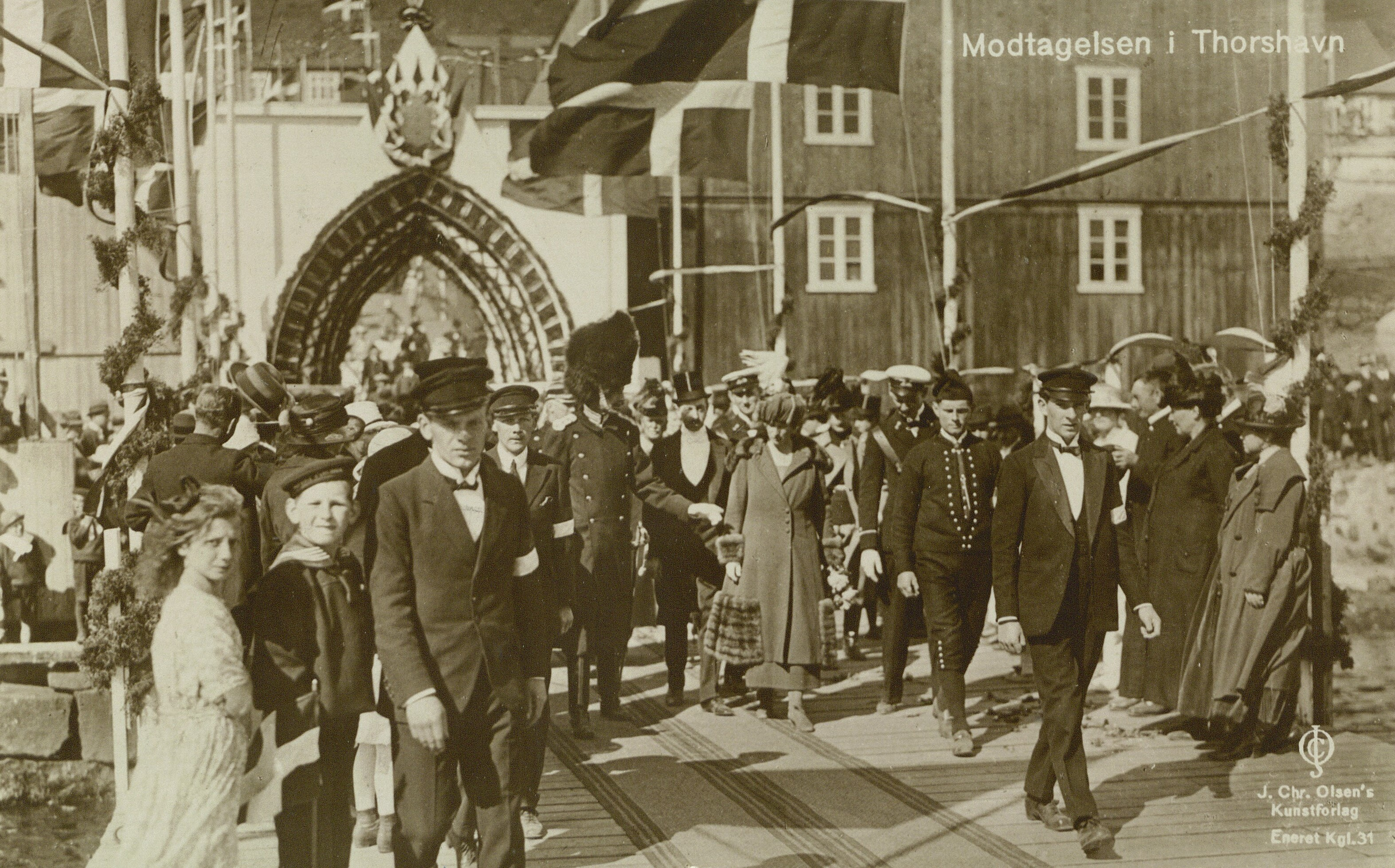
The King and Queen in Thorshavn during a visit to the Faroe Islands in 1921.

On 14 May 1912, King Frederik VIII died suddenly in Hamburg, Germany, while returning from a recuperation stay in Nice in Southern France. Alexandrine's husband acceded to the throne as Christian X, and Alexandrine became queen consort of Denmark. She is not considered to have played any political role, but is described as being a loyal support to her spouse.

She was interested in music, and acted as the protector of the musical societies Musikforeningen i København and Den danske Richard Wagnerforening. She was known for her needlework, which she sold for charitable purposes. After the death of her mother-in-law Louise of Sweden in 1926, she succeeded her as the official protector of the various charity organisations founded by Louise. She enjoyed golf and photography.

During World War I, she founded Dronningens Centralkomité af 1914 ("The Queen's Central Committee of 1914") to the support of poor families. The revolution in Russia brought much heartbreak for Alexandrine as three of her uncles, Nicholas, George and Sergey, were killed by the Bolsheviks.

She survived the 1918 flu pandemic.

=== World War II ===
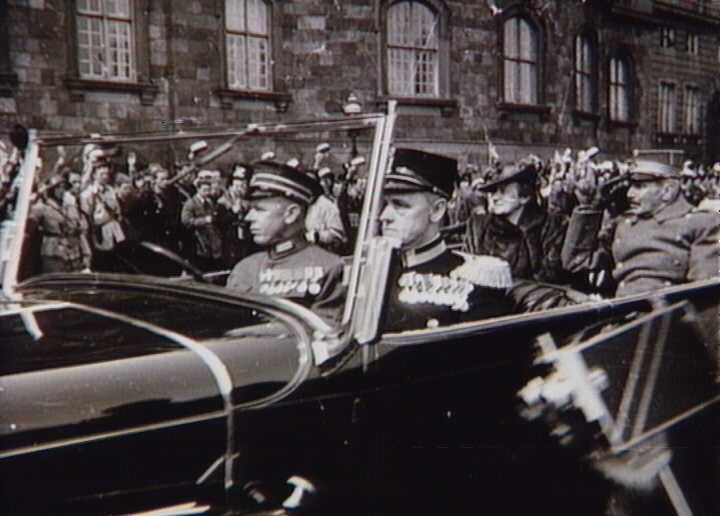
The King and Queen arriving at Christiansborg Palace in Copenhagen on 9 May 1945 at the first opening of Parliament following the end of Nazi Germany's occupation of Denmark.

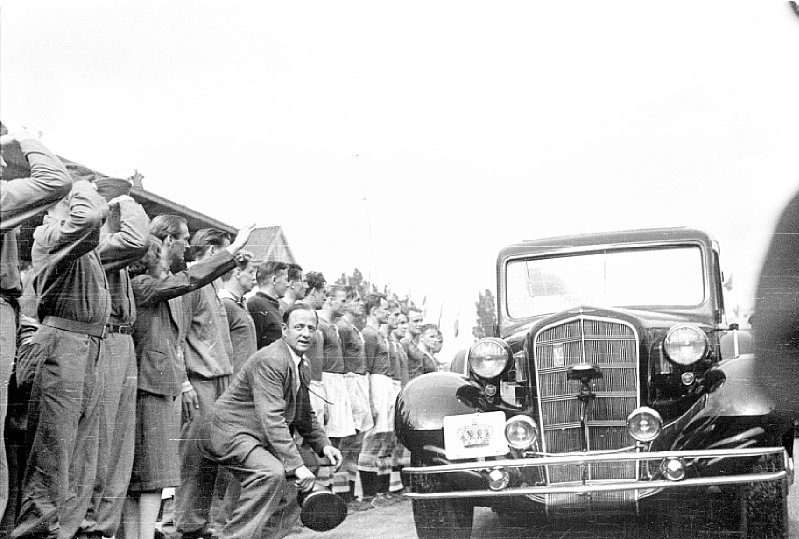
The King and Queen arrives at the first football match against Sweden after the liberation of Denmark in 1945.

The couple was given great popularity as national symbols during the World War II occupation, which was demonstrated during a tour through the country in 1946. Before the occupation, she and her daughter-in-law were engaged in mobilising the Danish women.

Her rejection of Major General Kurt Himer, Chief of Staff to General Kaupisch on 9 April 1940 became a symbol for her loyalty toward Denmark before her birth country Germany and was diplomatically obliged to receive the German General commander at her castle. After the introduction she observed icily: "In different circumstances, you would have been welcome." Then, after a pause, she added: "I am a German, that's right, but today I'm ashamed of it." When General Himer asked for an audience with the monarch, Christian was persuaded to receive him by his daughter-in-law as he would any other, which was supported by Alexandrine. He asked to do so alone, but Alexandrine told him she would interrupt them. When the General was about to leave, she came in; and when he greeted her, she said: "General, this is not the circumstance in which I expected to greet a countryman."

It was reported, that although Alexandrine was seen as shy and disliked official ceremonies, she had a "sharp" intelligence, and she was, together with her daughter-in-law, Ingrid of Sweden, a true support of the monarch and a driving force for the resistance toward the occupation within the royal house. It was also reported, that in contrast to the monarch himself and the Crown Prince, the Queen and the Crown Princess never lost their calm when the nation was attacked. As she was not the Head of the Royal House, she could show herself in public more than her spouse, who did not wish to show support to the occupation by being seen in public, and she used this to engage in various organisations for social relief to ease the difficulties caused by the occupation. Her first years in Denmark were afflicted by the prevailing anti-German attitude of the Danes, but she won them over. Kaj Munk is quoted to describe the public appreciation of her during World War II with his comment: "Protect our Queen, the only German we would like to keep!"

== Later life ==
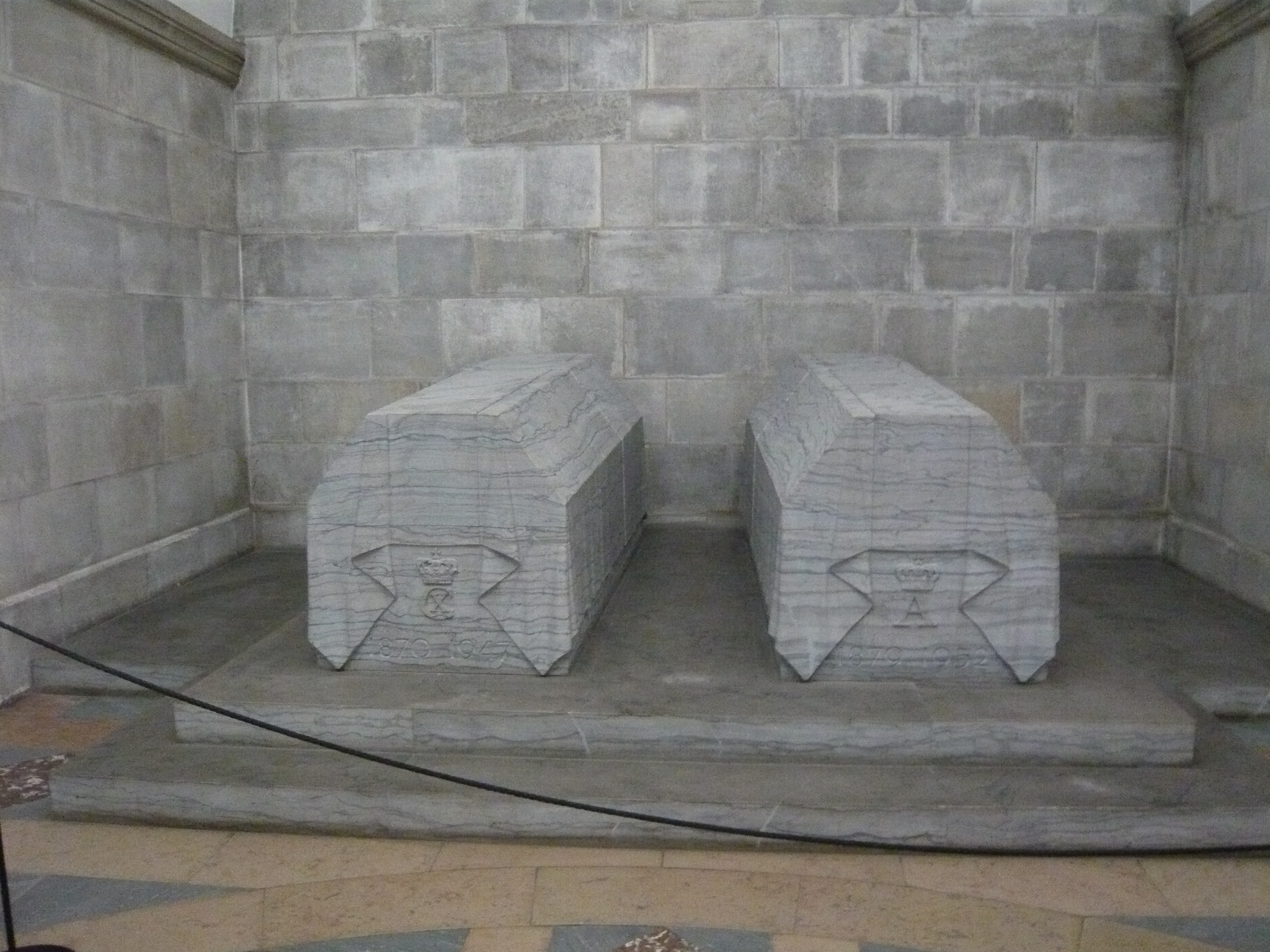
Alexandrine's and Christian's sarcophagi at Roskilde Cathedral

In 1947, she was widowed; she became the first queen dowager of Denmark to opt not to use that title. In her later years, Alexandrine spent most of her widowhood at Marselisborg Castle in Jutland. She remained very active until the end of her life, continuing her work as a patron and her charitable work; she was also an avid golfer and photographer, and produced excellent needlework.

Queen Alexandrine died on 28 December 1952 in her sleep, aged 73. She had an intestinal operation a week and a half before her death. She was buried at the traditional burial place of the royal family in Roskilde Cathedral.

== Honours and arms ==
Arms of alliance of Queen Alexandrine

Monogram of Queen Alexandrine

=== National honours ===
- German Empire German Imperial and Royal Family: Dame of the Imperial and Royal Order of Louise, 1st Class
  - Mecklenburg-Schwerin House of Mecklenburg-Schwerin: Knight Grand Cross of the Schwerin Royal House Order of the Wendish Crown, Special Class
- Denmark: Knight with Collar of the Order of the Elephant
- Denmark: Knight Grand Commander of the Order of the Dannebrog
- Denmark: Dame of the Royal Family Order of King Christian IX
- Denmark: Dame of the Royal Family Order of King Frederik VIII
- Denmark: Dame of the Royal Family Order of King Christian X

=== Foreign honours ===
- Iceland: Grand Cross of the Order of the Falcon
- Russian Empire Russian Imperial Family: Dame Grand Cordon of the Imperial Order of Saint Catherine
- Spain Spanish Royal Family: 1,170th Dame Grand Cross of the Royal Order of Queen Maria Luisa
- Sweden: Member of the Royal Order of the Seraphim
- Sweden: Recipient of the 70th Birthday Badge Medal of King Gustaf V
- Sweden: Recipient of the 90th Birthday Badge Medal of King Gustav V

== Ancestors ==
Ancestors of Alexandrine of Mecklenburg-Schwerin

8. Paul Frederick, Grand Duke of Mecklenburg-Schwerin
4. Frederick Francis II, Grand Duke of Mecklenburg-Schwerin
9. Princess Alexandrine of Prussia
2. Frederick Francis III, Grand Duke of Mecklenburg-Schwerin
10. Heinrich LXIII, Prince Reuss of Köstritz
5. Princess Augusta Reuss of Köstritz
11. Countess Eleonore of Stolberg-Wernigerode
1. Alexandrine of Mecklenburg-Schwerin
12. Nicholas I of Russia
6. Grand Duke Michael Nikolaevich of Russia
13. Princess Charlotte of Prussia
3. Grand Duchess Anastasia Mikhailovna of Russia
14. Leopold, Grand Duke of Baden
7. Princess Cecilie of Baden
15. Princess Sophie of Sweden

== Notes ==
Alexandrine of Mecklenburg-Schwerin House of Mecklenburg-Schwerin Cadet branch of the House of Mecklenburg Born: 24 December 1879 Died: 28 December 1952
Danish royalty
Preceded by Louise of Sweden	Queen consort of Denmark; 1912–1947	Succeeded by Ingrid of Sweden
New title Kingdom of Iceland created	Queen consort of Iceland; 1918–1944	Vacant Republic of Iceland created
