= Anastasia Romanova (disambiguation) =

Anastasia Romanova primarily refers to:

- Anastasia Romanovna (1530–1560), the first wife of Ivan the Terrible
- Grand Duchess Anastasia Nikolaevna of Russia (1901–1918), daughter of Nicholas II of Russia, killed during the massacre of the Romanov royal family by the Bolsheviks during the Russian Revolution
  - Anya (Anastasia), fictional character from the 1997 animated film Anastasia, based on Grand Duchess Anastasia Nikolaevna of Russia

Anastasia with the surname Romanova or Romanovna or Romanoff may also refer to:

- Grand Duchess Anastasia Mikhailovna of Russia (1860–1922), daughter of Grand Duke Michael Nikolaevich of Russia
- Princess Anastasia of Montenegro, (1868–1935), wife of Grand Duke Nicholas Nikolaevich of Russia
- Countess Anastasia Mikhailovna de Torby (1892–1977), morganatic daughter of Grand Duke Michael Mikhailovich of Russia
- Anastasia Romanova (skier) (born 1993), Russian ski racer
- Anastasia Romanova (weightlifter) (born 1991), Russian female weightlifter

== See also ==
- Anastasia (disambiguation)
- Anastasia of Russia (disambiguation)
