= Anastasia of Russia =

Anastasia of Russia may refer to:

== People ==
=== Born or died 11th and 12th century ===
- Anastasia of Kiev (1023–1074/1096), daughter of Yaroslav the Wise; wife of Andrew I of Hungary
- Anastasia Monomachina (died 1067), daughter of Constantine IX Monomachos and first wife of Vsevolod I of Kiev as Princess of Pereyaslavl
- Anastasia Yaropolkovna (1074–1159), daughter of Yaropolk Izyaslavich, Prince of Turov and Volyn, and wife of Gleb Vseslavich as Princess of Minsk
- Maria of Poland (renamed Anastasia, 1164–1194), daughter of Casimir II the Just, and wife of Vsevolod IV of Kiev

=== Born or died 14th century ===
- Anna Dmitriyevna of Moscow (monastic name Anastasia, born 1387), daughter of Dmitry Donskoy and wife of Yury Patrikiyevich of Lithuania
- Anastasia Levievna of Galicia (died 1335), daughter of Lev I of Galicia and wife of Siemowit of Masovia as Duchess of Kuyavia-Brieg
- Augusta or Anastasia of Lithuania (died 1345), daughter of Gediminas and wife of Simeon of Moscow
- Anastasia Yurievna of Galicia (died 1364/5), daughter of Yuri I of Galicia and wife of Aleksandr Mikhailovich of Tver

=== Born or died 15th or 16th century ===
- Anastasia Alexandrovna of Suzdal (died 1404?), daughter of Andrey of Mozhaysk and second wife of Boris of Tver
- Anastasia Andreevna of Mozhaysk (died 1451), daughter of Andrey of Mozhaysk and first wife of Boris of Tver
- Anastasia Kazanskaya (died 1540), granddaughter of Ivan III of Moscow from his daughter Eudokia, and wife of Prince Feodor Mikhailovich Mstislavsky and Prince Vasili Vasilievich Shuisky
- Anastasia Romanovna Zakharyina-Yurieva (1530–1560), daughter of Roman Yurievich Zakharyin-Yuriev and first wife of Ivan IV of Russia
- Anastasia Vasilievna of Moscow (died 1470), daughter of Vasily I of Moscow and wife of Alexander Olelka and ancestress of the Olelkovich
- Anastasia Yurievna of Smolensk (died 1422), daughter of Yury of Smolensk and wife of Yury of Zvenigorod

=== Born or died 17th century–present ===
- Grand Duchess Anastasia Mikhailovna of Russia (1860–1922), daughter of Grand Duke Michael Nikolaevich of Russia; wife of Frederick Francis III, Grand Duke of Mecklenburg
- Countess Anastasia Mikhailovna de Torby (1892–1977), morganatic daughter of Grand Duke Michael Mikhailovich of Russia, wife of Harold Augustus Wernher
- Princess Anastasia of Montenegro, (1868–1935), daughter of Nicholas I of Montenegro; wife of Grand Duke Nicholas Nikolaevich of Russia as Grand Duchess Anastasia Nikolaevna of Russia
- Grand Duchess Anastasia Nikolaevna of Russia (1901–1918), daughter of Nicholas II of Russia
- Tsarevna Anastasia Vasilievna of Russia (born 1610), daughter of Vasili IV of Russia

=== Unknown birth and death date ===
- Anastasia Alexandrovna of Belz (?–?), daughter of Alexander of Belz and wife of Boleslaw I of Masovia as Duchess of Masovia
- Anastasia Dmitriyevna of Moscow (?–?), daughter of Dmitry Donskoy and wife of Ivan of Kholm
- Anastasia Petrovna Golovina (?–?), wife of Prince Alexander Gorbatyi-Shuisky
- Anastasia Olegovna of Ryazan (?–?), daughter of Oleg II of Ryazan and wife of Kaributas
- Anastasia Yaroslavna of Kiev (?–?), daughter of Yaroslav II of Kiev

== See also ==
- Anastasia (disambiguation)
- Anastasia Romanova (disambiguation)
