= Anastacia (disambiguation) =

Anastacia (born 1968 as Anastacia Lyn Newkirk) is an American singer.

Anastacia may also refer to:

- Anastacia (given name), a female given name
- Anastacia (album), 2004 album by Anastacia Lyn Newkirk
- Anastácia, a Mulher sem Destino (TV series; a.k.a. Anastácia), a 1967 Brazilian telenovela

== See also ==
- Anastasia (disambiguation)
- Anastatia (disambiguation)
