= List of saints named Anastasia =

Saint Anastasia or Santa Anastasia may refer to one of several saints, including:

- Basilissa and Anastasia of Rome (died AD 68), martyrs
- Anastasia the Roman (died c. 250), virgin martyr
- Anastasia of Sirmium (died 304), virgin martyr who is commemorated in the Canon of the Mass
- Anastasia the Patrician (fl. 576), Byzantine lady-in-waiting and hermit in Egypt
- Athanasia of Aegina, (c. 790–860), a.k.a. Anastasia, Byzantine abbess and advisor to Byzantine Empress Theodora II

== Eastern Orthodox ==
- Anastasia of Serbia (died 1200), Grand Princess consort of Serbia and nun
- Grand Duchess Anastasia Nikolaevna of Russia (1901–1918), youngest daughter of Nicholas II and passion bearer

== See also ==
- Saint Anastasia (disambiguation), for the use of the term other than for people
- Anastasia (disambiguation)
- Anastasia (name)
