= NumBrands =

Numbrands, Inc. is the company behind Anestasia Vodka and originally the Anestasia Sensational Spirit, alcohol spirits. The idea behind the company name was to describe the "tingling" mouthfeel in the first trial product. However, after consumer trials, the company decided to first launch a neutral spirit and consider later on adding the "Sensational Spirit" as a flavor to accompany the brand. The spelling comes from the founder's family name, but due to the history of the name Anastasia, the vodka is commonly misspelled and should be spelled AnestasiA, with an "e."

== Company history ==
Numbrands, Inc. is headquartered in White Plains, New York. Yuliya Mamontova incorporated Numbrands, Inc. in 2008. Numbrands, Inc. launched Anestasia Vodka in July 2013 in Las Vegas with Southern Wine & Spirits.
