= Frederik IX =

King of Denmark from 1947 to 1972

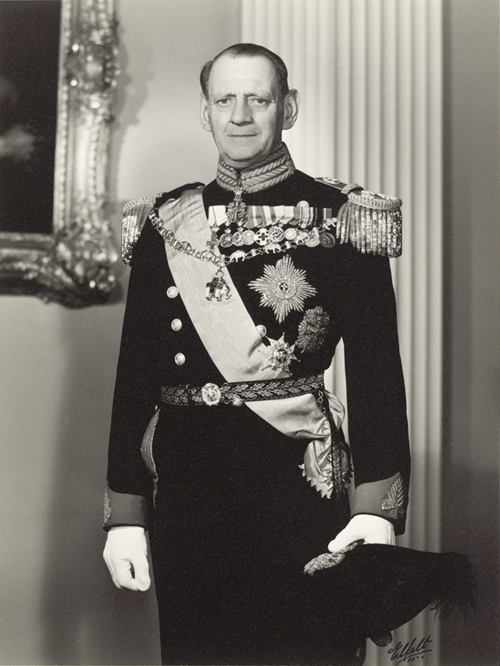
- Official portrait, 1950

King of Denmark
- Reign: 20 April 1947 – 14 January 1972
- Predecessor: Christian X
- Successor: Margrethe II
- Born: 11 March 1899; Sorgenfri Palace, Kongens Lyngby, Denmark
- Died: 14 January 1972 (aged 72); Municipal Hospital, Copenhagen, Denmark
- Burial: 24 January 1972; Roskilde Cathedral, Roskilde, Denmark
- Spouse: Ingrid of Sweden (m. 1935)
- Issue: Margrethe II, Queen of Denmark; Benedikte, Princess of Sayn-Wittgenstein-Berleburg; Anne-Marie, Queen of Greece
Names
- Christian Frederik Franz Michael Carl Valdemar Georg
- House: Glücksburg
- Father: Christian X
- Mother: Alexandrine of Mecklenburg-Schwerin
- Religion: Church of Denmark

Frederik IX (Christian Frederik Franz Michael Carl Valdemar Georg; 11 March 1899 – 14 January 1972) was King of Denmark from 1947 to 1972.

Frederik was born into the House of Glücksburg during the reign of his great-grandfather King Christian IX. He was the first child of Prince Christian of Denmark and Princess Alexandrine of Mecklenburg-Schwerin (later King Christian X and Queen Alexandrine). He became crown prince when his father succeeded as king in 1912. As a young man, he was educated at the Royal Danish Naval Academy. In 1935, he married Princess Ingrid of Sweden. They had three daughters: Margrethe, Benedikte and Anne-Marie. During Nazi Germany's occupation of Denmark, Frederik acted as regent from 1942 until 1943 on behalf of his father, who had suffered a horseback riding accident in October 1942.

Frederik became king on his father's death in April 1947. During Frederik's reign, Danish society changed rapidly, the welfare state was expanded and, as a consequence of the booming economy of the 1960s, women entered the labour market. The modernization brought new demands on the monarchy and Frederik's role as a constitutional monarch. Frederik died in 1972, and was succeeded by his eldest daughter, Margrethe II.

== Birth and family ==
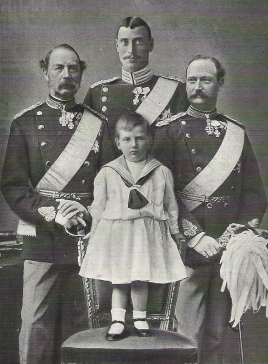
Four generations — four kings: King Christian IX, Crown Prince Frederik (VIII), Prince Christian (X) and Prince Frederik (IX) in 1903

Frederik was born on 11 March 1899 at his parents' country residence, the Sorgenfri Palace, located on the shores of the small river Mølleåen in Kongens Lyngby north of Copenhagen on the island of Zealand in Denmark, during the reign of his great-grandfather King Christian IX. His father was Prince Christian of Denmark (later King Christian X), the eldest son of Crown Prince Frederik and Princess Louise of Sweden (later King Frederik VIII and Queen Louise). His mother was Alexandrine of Mecklenburg-Schwerin, the eldest daughter of Frederick Francis III, Grand Duke of Mecklenburg-Schwerin and Grand Duchess Anastasia Mikhailovna of Russia.

He was baptised in the Garden Room at Sorgenfri Palace on 9 April 1899 by the royal confessor Jakob Paulli. The young prince had 21 godparents: Christian IX of Denmark (his paternal great-grandfather); Crown Prince Frederik of Denmark (his paternal grandfather); the Dowager Grand Duchess Anastasia of Mecklenburg-Schwerin (his maternal grandmother); Grand Duke Michael Nikolaevich of Russia (his maternal great-grandfather); Dowager Grand Duchess Marie of Mecklenburg-Schwerin (his maternal step-great-grandmother); Prince Carl of Denmark (his paternal uncle); Princess Thyra of Denmark (his paternal aunt); Frederick Francis IV, Grand Duke of Mecklenburg-Schwerin (his maternal uncle); George I of Greece (his paternal great-uncle); Albert Edward, Prince of Wales (his paternal great-uncle by marriage); Ernest August, Duke of Cumberland (his paternal great-uncle by marriage); Grand Duke Alexander Mikhailovich of Russia (his maternal great-uncle); his first cousins once removed, Nicholas II of Russia, George, Duke of York, Prince George of Greece and Denmark and Georg Wilhelm, Hereditary Prince of Hanover; Crown Prince Constantine and Crown Princess Sophia of Greece (his first cousin once removed, and his wife); his paternal great-granduncles, Prince Johann of Schleswig-Holstein-Sonderburg-Glücksburg and King Oscar II of Sweden and Norway; and Crown Prince Gustaf and Crown Princess Victoria of Sweden (his first cousin twice removed and his wife).

Frederik's only sibling, Knud, was born one year after Frederik. The family lived in apartments in Christian VIII's Palace at Amalienborg Palace in Copenhagen, in Sorgenfri Palace near the capital and in a summer residence, Marselisborg Palace in Aarhus in Jutland, which Frederik's parents had received as a wedding present from the people of Denmark in 1898. In 1914, the King also built the villa Klitgården in Skagen in Northern Jutland.

== Early life ==
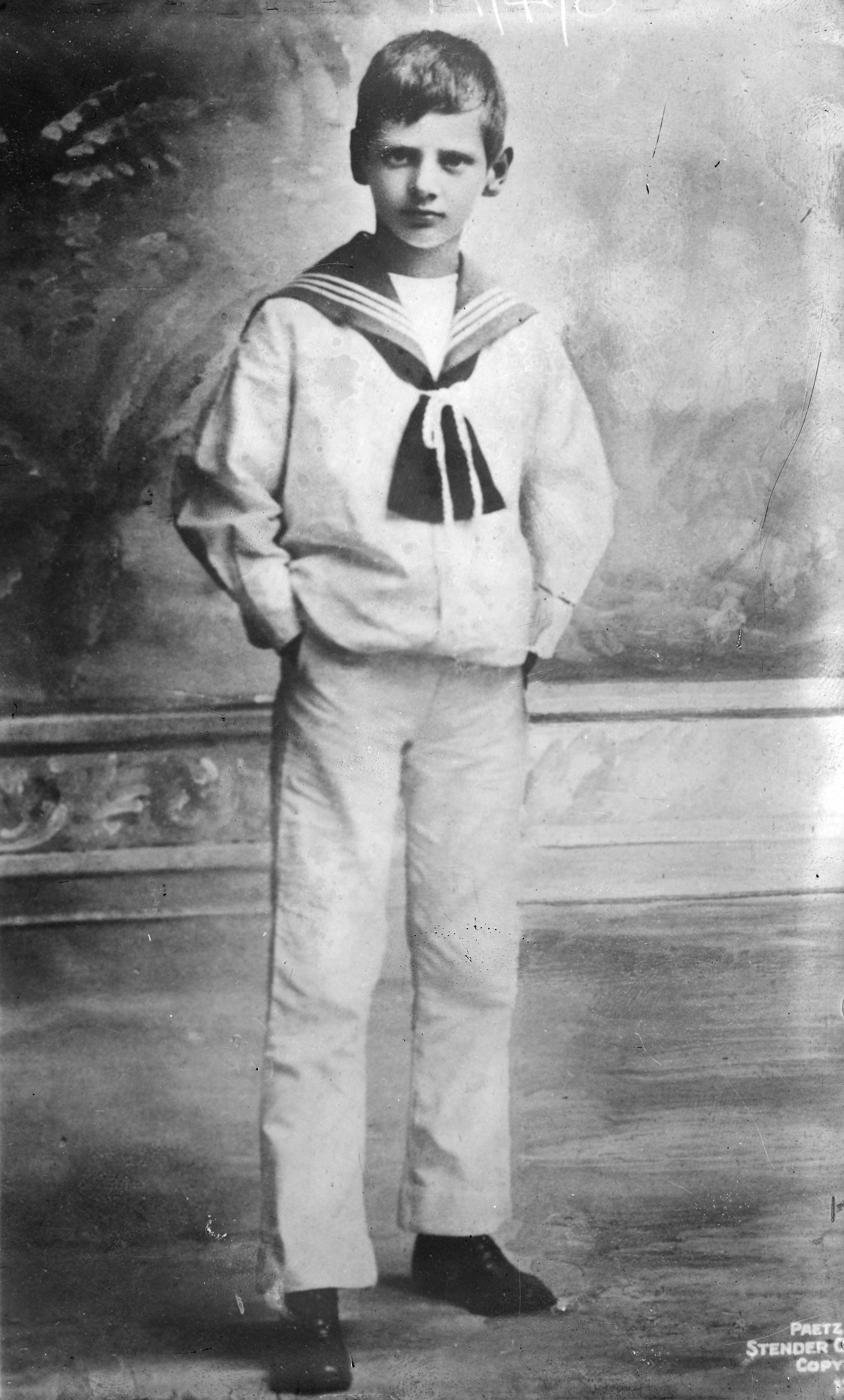
Crown Prince Frederik, c. 1914

Christian IX died on 29 January 1906, and Frederik's grandfather Crown Prince Frederik succeeded him as King Frederik VIII. Frederik's father became crown prince, and Frederik moved up to second in line to the throne.

Just six years later, on 14 May 1912, King Frederik VIII died, and Frederik's father ascended the throne as King Christian X. Frederik himself became crown prince. On 1 December 1918, as the Danish–Icelandic Act of Union recognized Iceland as a fully sovereign state in personal union with Denmark through a common monarch, Frederik also became crown prince of Iceland (where his name was officially spelled Friðrik). However, as a national referendum established the Republic of Iceland on 17 June 1944, he never succeeded as king of Iceland.

Frederik was educated at the Royal Danish Naval Academy (breaking with Danish royal tradition by choosing a naval instead of an army career) and the University of Copenhagen. He served in the Royal Danish Navy between 1917 and 1947. Before he became king, he had acquired the rank of rear admiral, and he had had several senior commands on active service. He acquired several tattoos during his naval service including dragons, birds, and other traditional tattoo motifs that were popular among sailors of the time.

In addition, with his love of music, Frederik was an able piano player and conductor.

== Marriage and issue ==
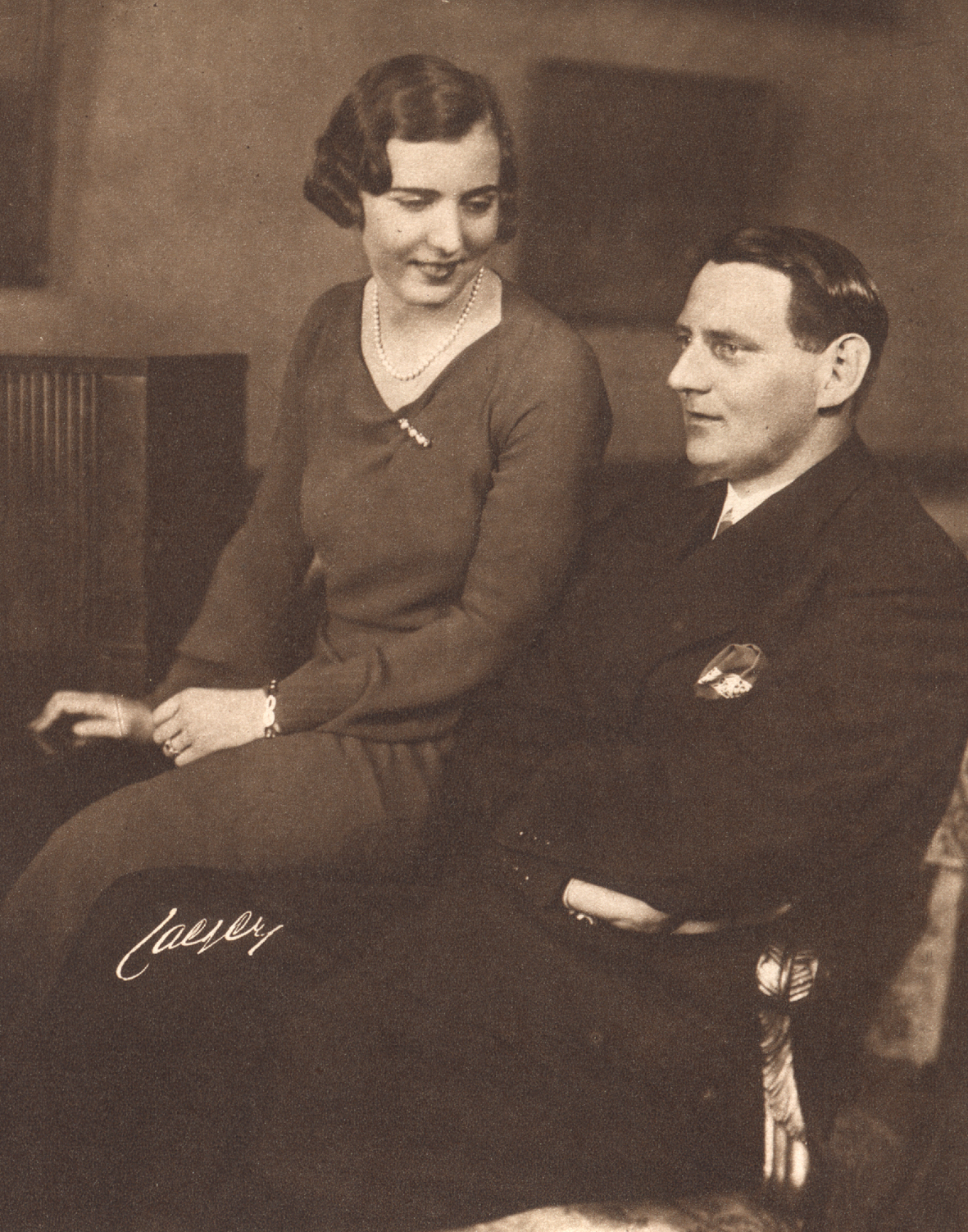
The newly engaged Princess Ingrid of Sweden and Crown Prince Frederik of Denmark, 1935

In the 1910s, Alexandrine considered the two youngest daughters of her cousin Tsar Nicholas II, Grand Duchesses Maria and Anastasia Nikolaevna of Russia, as possible wives for Frederik until the execution of the Romanov family in 1918. In 1922, Frederik was engaged to Princess Olga of Greece and Denmark, his double second cousin, through King Christian IX of Denmark and the other through Frederick Francis II. They never wed.

Instead, on 15 March 1935, a few days after his 36th birthday, his engagement to Princess Ingrid of Sweden (1910–2000), a daughter of Crown Prince Gustaf Adolf (later King Gustaf VI Adolf of Sweden) and his first wife, Princess Margaret of Connaught, was announced. They had gotten engaged in private in the beginning of February. Frederik and Ingrid were related in several ways. In descent from Oscar I of Sweden and Leopold, Grand Duke of Baden, they were double third cousins. In descent from Paul I of Russia, Frederik was a fourth cousin of Ingrid's mother. They married in Stockholm Cathedral on 24 May 1935. Their wedding was one of the greatest media events of the day in Sweden in 1935, and among the wedding guests were the King and Queen of Denmark, the King and Queen of Belgium and the Crown Prince and Crown Princess of Norway.

Upon their return to Denmark, the couple were given Frederik VIII's Palace at Amalienborg Palace in Copenhagen as their primary residence and Gråsten Palace in Northern Schleswig as a summer residence.

Their daughters are:

- Queen Margrethe II of Denmark, born 16 April 1940, married to Count Henri de Laborde of Monpezat and has two sons
- Princess Benedikte of Denmark, born 29 April 1944, married to Richard, 6th Prince of Sayn-Wittgenstein-Berleburg and has three children
- Princess Anne-Marie of Denmark, born 30 August 1946, married to King Constantine II of Greece and has five children

== Reign ==
From 1942 until 1943, Frederik acted as regent on behalf of his father who was temporarily incapacitated after a fall from his horse in October 1942.

On 20 April 1947, Christian X died, and Frederik succeeded to the throne. He was proclaimed king from the balcony of Christiansborg Palace by Prime Minister Knud Kristensen.

Frederik IX's reign saw great change. During these years, Danish society shook off the restrictions of an agricultural society, developed a welfare state, and, as a consequence of the booming economy of the 1960s, women entered the labour market. In other words, Denmark became a modern country, which meant new demands on the monarchy.

In 1948, one year into the king's reign, the Faroe Islands obtained home rule and became a self-governing country within the Danish Realm.

=== Changes to the Act of Succession ===
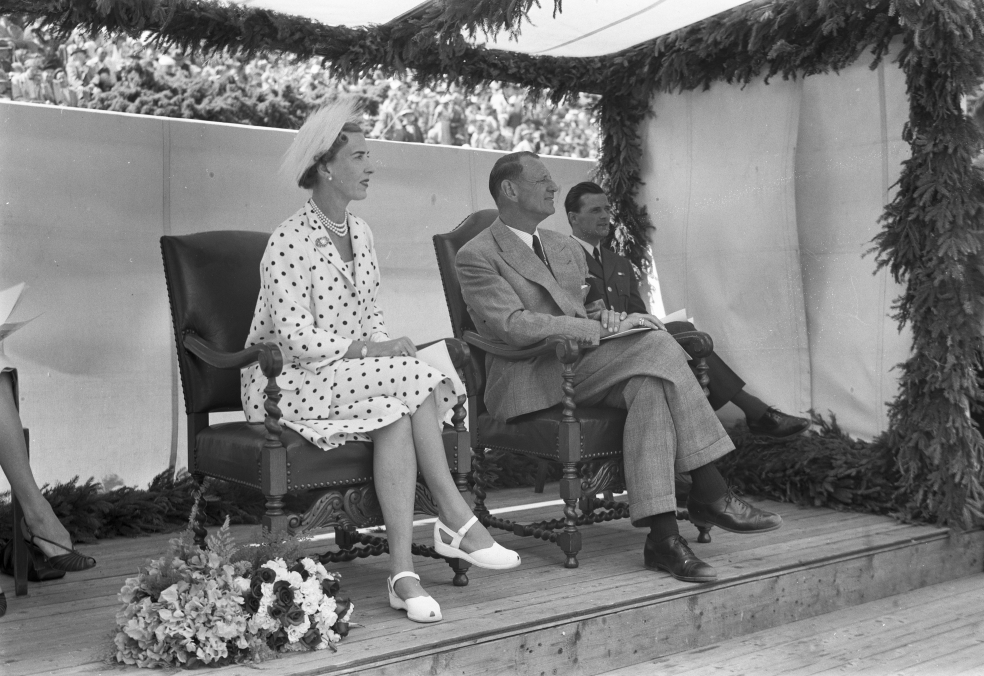
King Frederik IX and Queen Ingrid, c. 1950s

As King Frederik IX and Queen Ingrid had no sons, it was expected that the king's younger brother, Prince Knud, would inherit the throne, in accordance with Denmark's succession law (Royal Ordinance of 1853).

However, in 1953, an Act of Succession was passed, primarily changing the method of succession to male-preference primogeniture, allowing his daughters to succeed him if he had no sons. As a result, his eldest daughter, Margrethe, became heir presumptive.

== Death and funeral ==
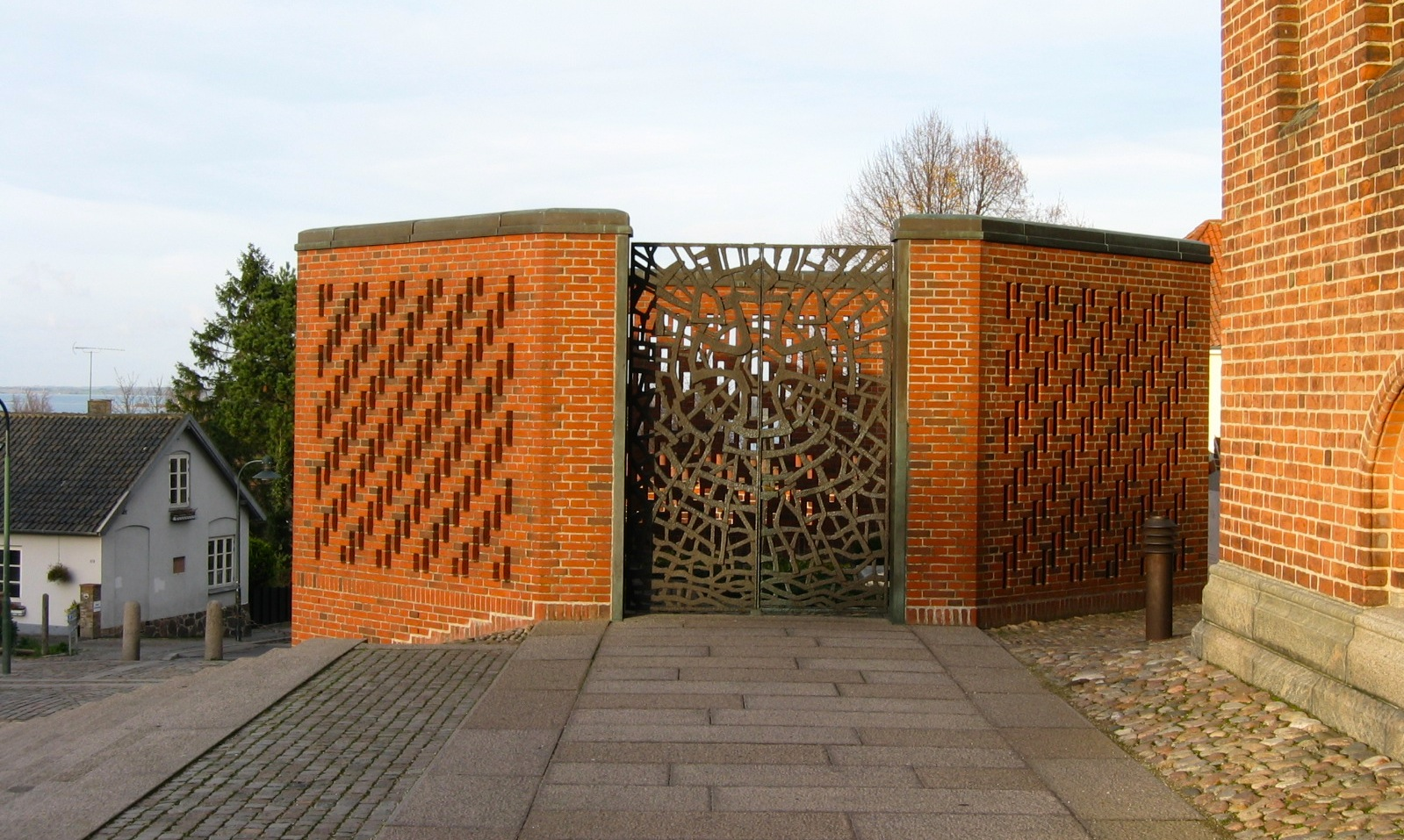
Mausoleum of Frederik IX, next to Roskilde Cathedral

Shortly after Frederik delivered his New Year's address on 31 December 1971, he became ill with flu-like symptoms. On 1 January 1972, he received treatment for pneumonia, with his New Year levées scheduled for 5 and 6 January being cancelled. On 3 January, he suffered a cardiac arrest and was rushed to the Copenhagen Municipal Hospital. After a brief period of apparent improvement, the king's condition deteriorated further on 11 January, and he died three days later, on 14 January, at 7:50 pm surrounded by his immediate family and closest friends, having been unconscious since the previous day. He was succeeded by his eldest daughter, Margrethe II.

Following his death, Frederik's coffin was transported to his home at Amalienborg Palace, where it stood until 18 January, when it was moved to the chapel at Christiansborg Palace. There, the coffin was placed on castrum doloris, a ceremony largely unchanged since introduced at the burial of Frederik III in 1670, and the last remaining royal ceremony where the Danish Crown Regalia is used. The king then lay in state for six days until his funeral, during which period the public could pay their last respects.

The funeral took place on 24 January 1972, and was split in two parts. A brief ceremony was first held in the chapel where the king had lain in state, in which the Bishop of Copenhagen, Willy Westergaard Madsen, said a brief prayer, followed by a hymn, before the coffin was carried out of the chapel by members of the Royal Life Guards and placed on a gun carriage for a procession to the Copenhagen Central Station. The gun carriage was pulled by 48 seamen and was escorted by honor guards from the Danish Army, Air Force, and Navy, as well as honor guards from France, Sweden, the United Kingdom, and the United States.

At the Copenhagen Central Station, the coffin was placed on a special railway carriage for the rail journey to Roskilde. The funeral train was pulled by two DSB class E steam engines. Once in Roskilde, the coffin was pulled through the city by a group of seamen to Roskilde Cathedral where the final ceremony took place. Previous rulers had been interred in the cathedral, but it was the King's wish to be buried outside.

Queen Ingrid survived her husband by 28 years. She died on 7 November 2000. Her remains were interred alongside him at the burial site outside Roskilde Cathedral.

== Legacy ==
In 1934, the Crown Prince Frederik Range in Greenland was named after him when it was first mapped by Sir Martin Lindsay during the British Trans-Greenland Expedition. On 20 April 1982, a statue of King Frederik IX dressed in the uniform of an admiral was unveiled by the Copenhagen harbour on the 35th anniversary of his accession to the throne in 1947 and in the tenth year after his death.

== Folktale ==
In the southern city of Sønderborg, Frederik has a dish named after himself. The dish is called "Kong Fiddes livret" (King Frederik's favorite). The name Fidde is a common diminutive nickname for people named Frederik in the southern parts of Denmark. The dish is supposedly one that was regularly served to Frederik on his birthday at Gråsten Palace. The dish consists of strips of flank steak, stirred in a creamy paprika and curry sauce, served with French fries, boiled potatoes, beetroot, boiled eggs and freshly sliced onions.

== Honours ==
Royal monogram

Danish honours

- Knight of the Elephant, 14 May 1912
- Cross of Honour of the Order of the Dannebrog, 11 March 1917
- Grand Commander of the Dannebrog, 3 February 1936
- King Christian IX Centenary Medal
- King Frederik VIII Centenary Medal
- Navy Long Service Award

Foreign honours

- Iceland: Grand Cross of the Falcon
- Austria: Grand Star of the Decoration for Services to the Republic of Austria
- Belgium: Grand Cordon of the Order of Leopold
- Czechoslovakia: Collar of the White Lion, 22 May 1935
- Dominican Republic: Grand Cross of the Order of Merit, with Gold Star
- (Ethiopian Empire) Ethiopian Imperial Family: Grand Cross of the Seal of Solomon
- Finland:
  - Collar of the White Rose, 1926
  - Commemoration Medal for the Finnish War of Liberation of 1918
  - Gold Commemoration Medal for the Winter War of 1939/40
  - Medal for Humane Benevolence
- (German Empire) German Imperial and Royal Family:
  - Knight of the Black Eagle, with Collar
  - Grand Cross of the Red Eagle
  - Mecklenburg Grand Ducal Family: Grand Cross of the Wendish Crown, with Crown in Ore
- Greek Royal Family:
  - Grand Cross of the Redeemer
  - Grand Cross of the Order of George I
  - Grand Cross of Saints George and Constantine
  - Commemorative Badge of the Centenary of the Royal House of Greece
- France: Grand Cross of the Legion of Honour
- Iranian Imperial Family:
  - Collar of the Order of Pahlavi
- (Kingdom of Italy) Italian Royal Family: Knight of the Annunciation, 10 March 1917
- Empire of Japan: Collar of the Order of the Chrysanthemum
- Netherlands: Grand Cross of the Netherlands Lion
- Norway: Grand Cross of St. Olav, with Collar, 10 April 1917
- Peru: Grand Cross of the Sun of Peru, in Diamonds
- (Russian Empire) Russian Imperial Family:
  - Knight of St. Andrew
  - Knight of St. Alexander Nevsky
  - Knight of the White Eagle
  - Knight of St. Anna, 1st Class
  - Knight of St. Stanislaus, 1st Class
- Sweden:
  - Knight of the Seraphim, with Collar, 11 March 1917
  - King Gustaf V Commemorative Medal
- Thailand:
  - Knight of the Order of the Royal House of Chakri, 18 February 1917
  - Grand Cordon of the Order of Chula Chom Klao
- United Kingdom:
  - Stranger Knight Companion of the Garter, 8 May 1951
  - Honorary Knight Grand Cross of the Bath
  - Honorary Knight Grand Cross of the Royal Victorian Order
  - Associate Bailiff Grand Cross of St. John
  - Recipient of the King George VI Coronation Medal

Honorary military appointments

- 1947: Admiral of Sweden
- 1947–61: Colonel-in-Chief of the Buffs (Royal East Kent Regiment)
- 1961–66: Colonel-in-Chief of the Queen's Own Buffs, The Royal Kent Regiment
- 1966–72: Colonel-in-Chief of the Queen's Regiment

Frederik IX House of Schleswig-Holstein-Sonderburg-Glücksburg Cadet branch of the House of Oldenburg Born: 11 March 1899 Died: 14 January 1972
Regnal titles
| Preceded by Christian X | King of Denmark; 1947–1972 | Succeeded by Margrethe II |
