= Anesthesia (disambiguation) =

Anesthesia or anaesthesia has traditionally meant the condition of having the perception of pain and other sensations blocked. In some countries, the term is also used to mean anesthesiology.

Anesthesia, Anaesthesia, or, Anæsthesia, may also refer to:

== Film ==
- Anesthesia (2015 film), a 2015 U.S. indie drama film
- Anesthesia (1929 film), a 1929 German silent film

== Music ==
=== Albums ===
- Anesthesia (album), a 1995 album by Fun People
- Anesthesia, a 1992 album by Premature Ejaculation

=== Songs ===
- "Anesthesia", the sixth track on the album Against the Grain (1990) by Bad Religion
- "Anesthesia", the thirteenth track on the album Life Is Killing Me (2003) by Type O Negative
- "Anesthesia", the fifth track on the album Errorzone (2018) by Vein
- "(Anesthesia) Pulling Teeth", the fifth track (an instrumental by Cliff Burton) on the album Kill 'Em All (1983) by Metallica

== Other ==
- Anaesthesia (journal), a medical journal

== See also ==
- Anastasia (disambiguation)
- Anesthetize (disambiguation)
