= Saint Anastasia =

Saint Anastasia or Santa Anastasia may refer to one of several saints named Anastasia. Otherwise it may refer to:

- Basilica di Sant'Anastasia al Palatino, basilica and titular church for cardinal-priests in Rome, Italy
- Cathedral of St. Anastasia (Zadar Cathedral), cathedral in Zadar, Croatia
- Sant'Anastasia, Verona, church in Verona, Italy
- St. Anastasia Island, Bulgarian islet
- Old St. Anastasia Catholic School, school in Fort Pierce, Florida, United States

== See also ==
- Anastasia of Serbia (Saint Anastasija)
- Escrava Anastacia (Slave Anastacia), Brazilian folk saint
- Sant'Anastasia (disambiguation)
- Anastasia (disambiguation)
