= Klitgaarden =

Former residence of the Danish royal family, Jutland

Coordinates: 57.7122°N 10.5689°E

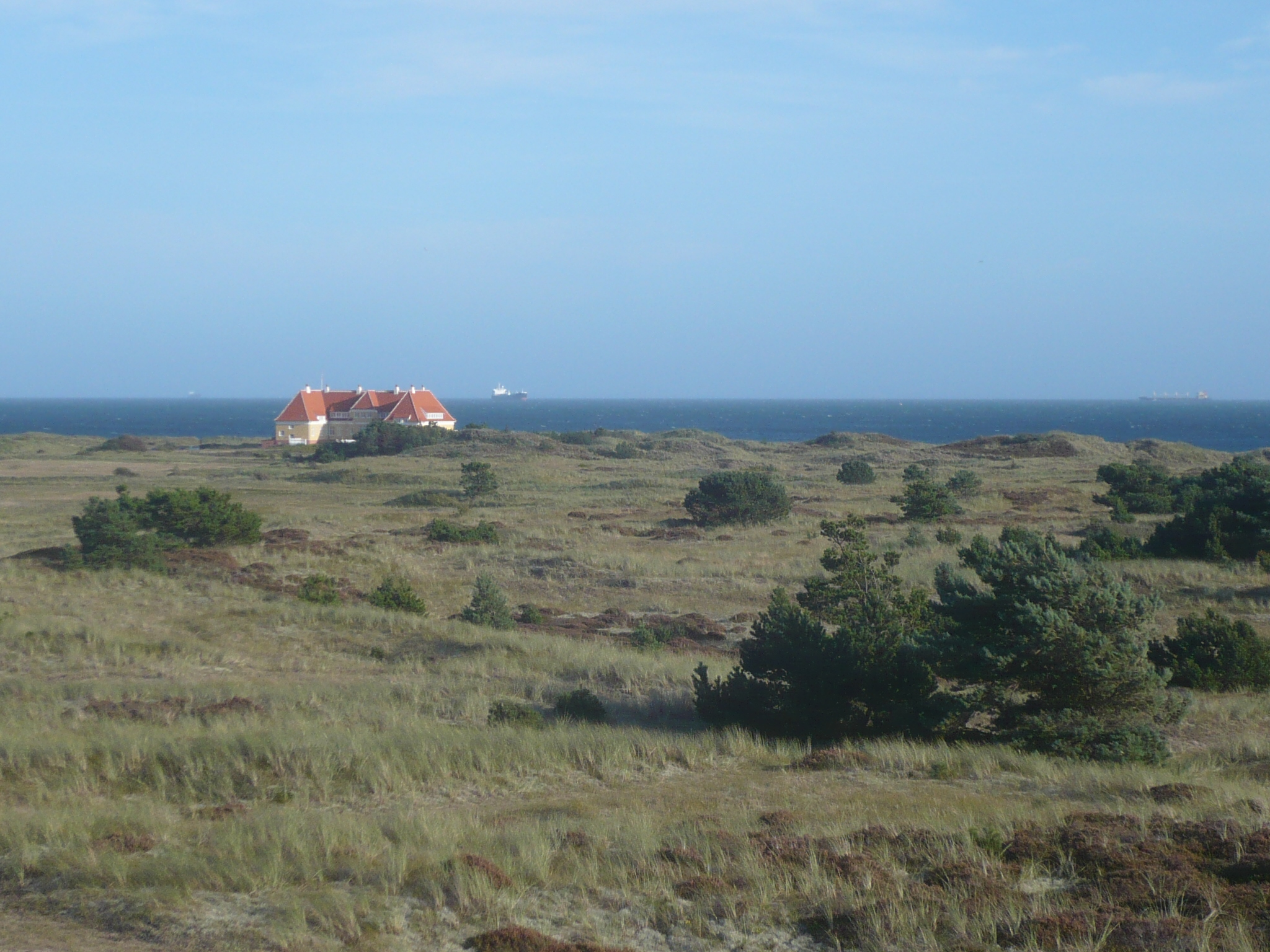
Klitgaarden with the sea as a backdrop

Klitgaarden (lit. "The Dune House") is a former summer residence of the Danish royal family situated just south of Skagen on the northern tip of Jutland. The house was designed by Ulrik Plesner for King Christian X and Queen Alexandrine and completed in 1914. It is now owned and run by a trust and serves as a retreat for artists and scientists.

== History ==
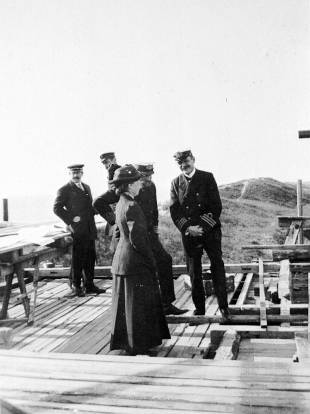
Queen Alexandrine inspecting the construction site in 1913

When Prince Christian married Alexandrine of Mecklenburg-Schwerin at a low-key ceremony in Cannes in 1898, the couple was given Marselisborg Palace just south of Aarhus as a summer residence by Aarhus Municipality. However, the princess fell in love with the scenic and exotic area around Skagen. For the last couple of decades the town had played host to a thriving artists colony of Skagen painters and since 1890, when it was connected by train to Frederikshavn, it had developed into a mondain summer destination. Prince Christian became crown prince of Denmark in January 1906 and when the couple attended the inauguration of the new Skagen harbour the following year, they discreetly visited a number of possible building sites, yet nothing happened until after their ascent to the throne in 1912. Queen Alexandrine missed a retreat from the official life in Copenhagen of more private and intimate proportions than that of Marselisborg. Word was therefore passed to the mayor of Skagen and soon after the city council presented the royal couple with a 4.5 ha piece of land situated directly on the East Coast a few kilometres south of town.

The architect Ulrik Plesner was charged with the task of designing a suitable house. He was an active member of the artist community in the town, and had already designed a number of prominent buildings there, including the railway station and the church. At the same time he was very active in Copenhagen where, as a result of his spacious, light-filled rooms and clean, aesthetic facades, he had become one of the main proponents of the reaction against the excess of the Historicist style which had dominated Danish architecture for some time.

Construction started in 1913 and the house was inaugurated in the spring of 1914. Over the following decades, Christian X and Queen Alexandrine spent many holidays at the house, especially Easter. Michael Ancher, one of the leading Skagen painters, became a close personal friend of the king. The house was originally located some 50 metres from the sea but the entire beach was washed away during a storm in the autumn of 1919. After the king's death in 1947 the dowager queen took up residency there for extended periods until her own death five years later.

Klitgaarden was then inherited by Hereditary Prince Knud while his elder brother, King Frederik IX, received the more representative Marselisborg Palace. Prince Knud and his family were also frequent users of the property but in 1995 it was put up for sale by his heirs.

With inspiration from San Cataldo in Amalfi in Italy, which had served as a retreat for Danish artists and scientists since 1924, consideration was given to turning Klitgaarden into a similar venue. The town of Skagen and a circle of prominent cultural figures including the writer Klaus Rifbjerg and art collector and founder of the Louisiana Museum of Modern Art Knud W. Jensen, collaborated to raise the funds needed to realize the plans. After a thorough renovation the refuge opened its doors in the summer of 2000.

== Architecture and furnishings ==
The house is a compact, three-winged building in two storeys. It is built in red bricks, but with yellow whitewashed walls typical of the area and has a steep roof topped by whitewashed chimneys.

Plesner also designed all the furniture. For the living room, the artist Harald Slott-Møller was commissioned to design 55 ornamental plates decorated with the signs of the zodiac, traditional costumes and coats of arms from Danish market towns.

== Klitgaarden today ==
The purpose of Klitgaarden is to provide Danish artists and researchers with a quiet, inspirational workplace for short periods and to create an environment where the residents can inspire each other. The house has 13 single rooms and one double room. It also provides meeting rooms and studios.
