= Sant'Anastasia (disambiguation) =

Sant'Anastasia may refer to:

- Sant'Anastasia, an Italian municipality in the Province of Naples
- Basilica di Sant'Anastasia al Palatino, a church in Rome
- Sant'Anastasia (Verona), a church in Verona

== See also ==
- Saint Anastasia (disambiguation)
- Anastasia (disambiguation)
