= Anesthetize (disambiguation) =

Anesthetize, anaesthetize, anaesthetise, anesthetise, anæsthetize, anæsthetise, anasthetize, anasthetise, may refer to:

== In general ==
- To induce anesthesia (verb: "to anesthetize")
- To use an anesthetic (verb: "to anesthetize")
- To practise anesthesiology

== Porcupine Tree ==
- "Anesthetize" (Porcupine Tree song), a 2007 song by Porcupine Tree off the album Fear of a Blank Planet
- Anesthetize (short film), a 2007 short film of Porcupine Tree off the DVD video single for "Fear of a Blank Planet"
- Anesthetize (concert film), a 2010 concert film DVD of the band Porcupine Tree
- Anesthetize (album), a 2010 live concert album of the band Porcupine Tree

== Other uses ==
- "Anesthetize" (Brainiac song), a 1993 song by Brainiac off the album Smack Bunny Baby

== See also ==
- Anesthesia (disambiguation)
