= Princess Anastasia =

Princess Anastasia may refer to:

== People ==
- Grand Duchess Anastasia Nikolaevna of Russia (1901–1918)
- Princess Anastasia of Georgia (1763–1838)
- Princess Anastasia of Greece and Denmark (1878–1923)
- Princess Anastasia of Montenegro (1868–1935)
- Princess Anastasia of Prussia (born 1944)

== Other meanings ==
- SPL Princess Anastasia (1986), cruiseferry

== See also ==
- Anastasia (disambiguation)
