= Anestasia Vodka =

American vodka brand

- Type: Vodka
- Manufacturer: NumBrands, Inc.
- Origin: United States
- Introduced: July 2013 in United States
- Alcohol by volume: 40.0%
- Proof (US): 80
- Website: Anestasia Vodka

AnestasiA Vodka is a vodka distilled in the United States. The spelling comes from the founder's family name and the bottle's shape represents the letter A for AnestasiA and the letter V for vodka.

== Company history ==
In 2007, co-founder Yuliya Mamontova started the project and hired Karim Rashid to design the packaging. The original recipe contained an ingredient that gave it a tingling effect. The product is now a neutral spirit, with no flavors added, and is produced in Bend, Oregon. NumBrands, Inc. is headquartered in White Plains, NY. Yuliya Mamontova incorporated Numbrands, Inc. in 2008 in order to introduce the new brand. After four years of financial investment, research and product development, Numbrands, Inc. launched Anestasia Vodka in July 2013 in Las Vegas with Southern Wine & Spirits.

Numbrands, Inc. is a family-owned and family-operated business.

== Awards ==
In 2012, AnestasiA Vodka won the Best Bottle and Best Case award from the Beverage Testing Institute.

In 2013, AnestasiA Vodka won a gold medal from the International Craft Awards and also received a 94 rating from the Beverage Testing Institute.

== See also ==
- List of vodkas
