= Anastasia (surname) =

Anastasia is a surname. Notable people with this surname include the following:

- Albert Anastasia (1902 – 1957), American mobster
- Antônio Anastasia (born 1961), Brazilian politician
- Flavio Anastasia (born 1969), Italian cyclist
- George Anastasia (born 1947), American writer
- Ino Anastasia (died 593), Byzantine empress consort
- Lawrence Anastasia (1926 – 2008), American politician
- Frieska Anastasia Laksani (born 1996), also known as Frieska JKT48, Indonesian singer
- Masayu Anastasia (born 1984), Indonesian model and actress

== See also ==
- Anastasia (disambiguation)
- Bryan Anastatia (born 1992), Netherlands soccer player
- Anastasi (surname)
- Anastasio
