= Anastácia, a Mulher sem Destino =

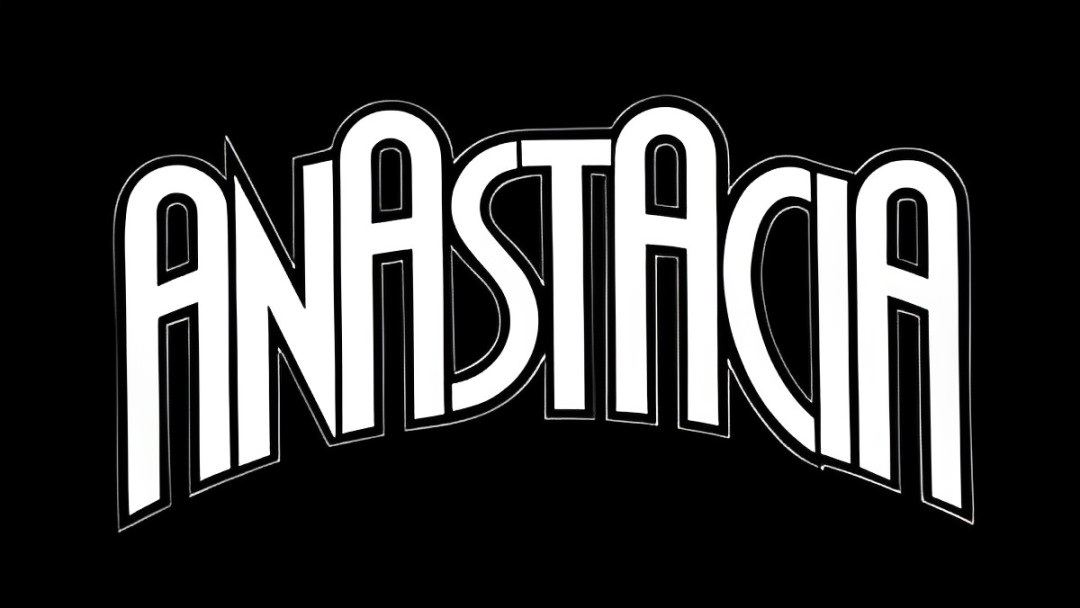
- Genre: Telenovela
- Created by: Emiliano Queiroz
- Developed by: Janete Clair
- Directed by: Henrique Martins
- Starring: Leila Diniz
- Country of origin: Brazil
- Original language: Portuguese
- No. of episodes: 125

Original release
- Network: TV Globo
- Release: 28 June – 16 December 1967

Anastácia, a Mulher sem Destino is a Brazilian telenovela produced and broadcast by TV Globo. It premiered on 28 June 1967 and ended on 16 December 1967. It was the fourth "novela das oito" to be aired in the timeslot.

== Cast ==
The cast includes more than 100 actors portraying different characters. Leila Diniz portrays the protagonist, Anastácia. Other actors include Henrique Martins, Ênio Santos and Miriam Pires.
