= Grand Duchess Anastasia Mikhailovna of Russia =

Grand Duchess of Mecklenburg-Schwerin from 1883 to 1897

Anastasia Mikhailovna of Russia
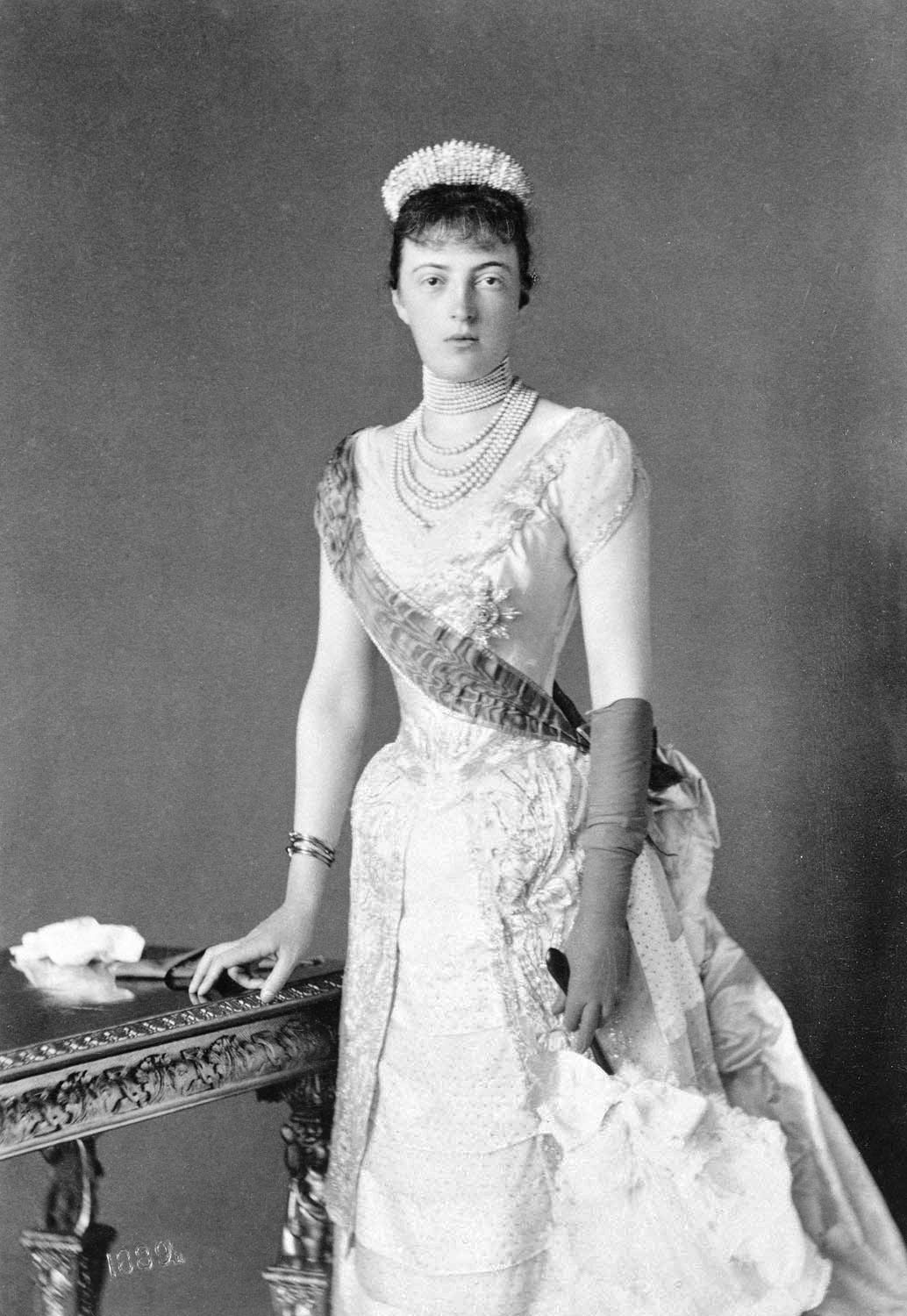
- Anastasia Mikhailovna in 1889

Grand Duchess consort of Mecklenburg-Schwerin
- Tenure: 15 April 1883 – 10 April 1897
- Born: 28 July 1860; Peterhof Palace, Peterhof, Saint Petersburg, Empire of Russia
- Died: 11 March 1922 (aged 61); Èze, French Third Republic
- Spouse: Friedrich Franz III, Grand Duke of Mecklenburg-Schwerin (m. 1879; died 1897)
- Issue: Alexandrine, Queen of Denmark; Friedrich Franz IV, Grand Duke of Mecklenburg-Schwerin; Cecilie, German Crown Princess; Alexis Louis de Wenden (illegitimate)
- House: Romanov
- Father: Grand Duke Michael Nikolaevich of Russia
- Mother: Princess Cecilie of Baden

Grand Duchess Anastasia Mikhailovna of Russia (Russian: Анастасия Михайловна; 28 July 1860 – 11 March 1922) was by birth member of the House of Romanov and a Grand Duchess of Russia and by marriage Grand Duchess of Mecklenburg-Schwerin.

== Early life ==
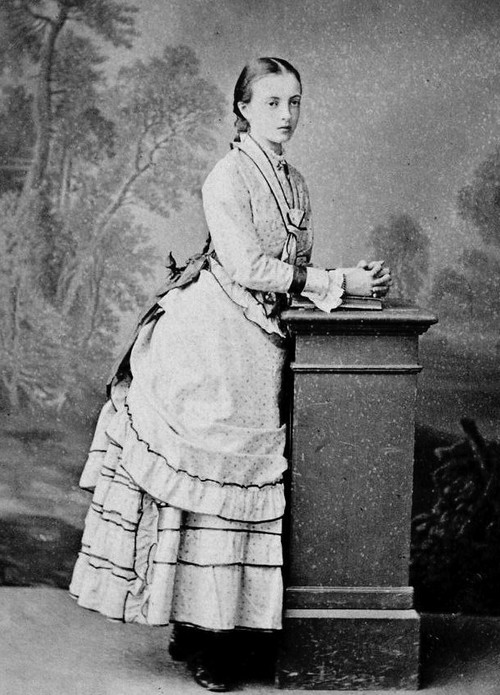
Grand Duchess Anastasia Mikhailovna of Russia, 1870

Anastasia Mikhailovna of Russia was born at the Peterhof Palace on 28 July 1860. As a child, she was nicknamed "Stassie" by those around her. She was the only daughter among the seven children of Grand Duke Mikhail Nikolaevich and Grand Duchess Olga Feodorovna, born Princess Cecilie of Baden, and thus the cherished child of the family, particularly favored by her father and doted on by her six brothers.

In 1862, her father was appointed Viceroy of the Caucasus. He settled with his family in Tiflis (now Tbilisi), the capital of Georgia, where Anastasia grew up in her father's large palace, as well as at the Borjomi estate, Likani Villa, the family's summer residence. Additionally, her father owned the Mikhailovsky Palace in St. Petersburg and a residence on the shores of the Black Sea.

Her father was heavily occupied with his military duties and responsibilities as governor. Anastasia's mother, Grand Duchess Olga, was extremely proud of her lineage, despite doubts about its legitimacy. She imposed strict German-style discipline and showed little affection for her children, educating them with a firm hand.

Lacking maternal affection, Anastasia found some tenderness from her brothers, though she was separated from them most of the time. On Sundays, she was allowed to join them for a walk. She was particularly close to her eldest brother, Grand Duke Nicholas Mikhailovich, with whom she shared artistic interests. She therefore grew up independently, displaying intelligence and a strong personality. She had an open and warm character. Tall and slender, with dark hair and green eyes, Anastasia's education focused on languages, as was customary for a princess destined to marry a European prince. She spoke Russian and German fluently, as well as French (the language of courts) and English.

== Marriage and issue ==
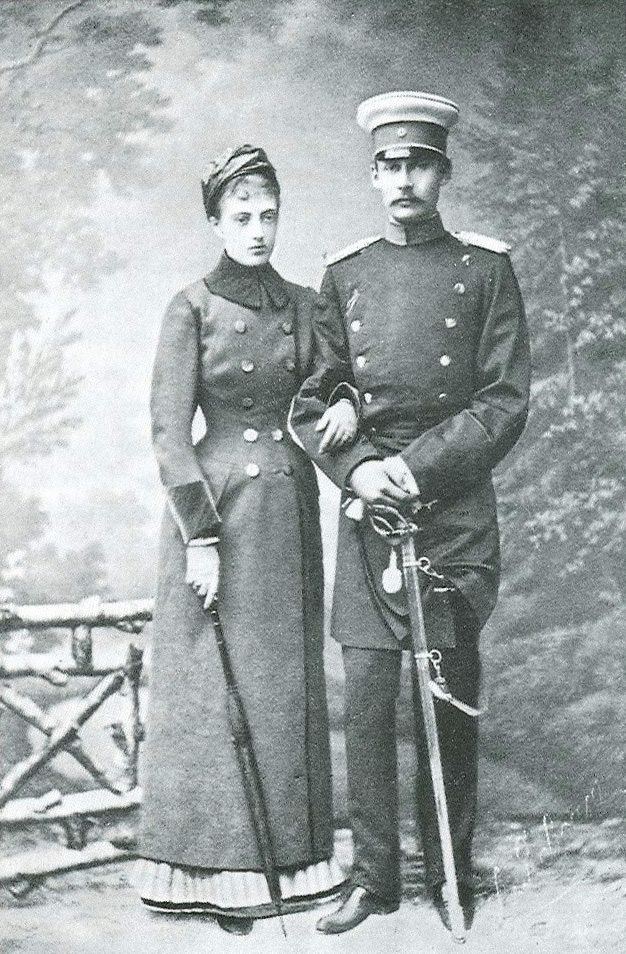
Anastasia Mikhailovna and Frederick Francis, 1880

By 1878, Anastasia had not yet turned eighteen, when her mother, Grand Duchess Olga, and Grand Duchess Maria Pavlovna (born Princess Marie of Mecklenburg-Schwerin), wife of the emperor's brother, decided to marry her to Prince Frederick Francis of Mecklenburg-Schwerin, son of Frederick Francis II, Grand Duke of Mecklenburg-Schwerin and Princess Augusta Reuss of Köstritz. The Mecklenburg-Schwerin heir was twenty-seven. Their grandmothers, Princess Alexandrine of Prussia and Princess Charlotte of Prussia, were sisters. Frederick Francis was also a direct descendant of Tsar Paul I of Russia.

In the spring of 1878, Prince Frederick Francis traveled to Tiflis to formally request Anastasia's hand. A relative of both the Hohenzollerns and the Romanovs, he was wealthy and heir to a German grand duchy on the Baltic Sea, within the Kingdom of Prussia. Though kind-hearted, he suffered from fragile health, including asthma, dermatitis, and heart weakness. Anastasia was not pleased with her fiancé and was concerned by his chronic skin condition, which sometimes forced him into extended periods of isolation.

As with most dynastic marriages, Anastasia had little choice. Their engagement was announced in October 1878, and she traveled with her parents to St. Petersburg for the marriage preparations. The wedding took place on January 24, 1879, at the Winter Palace in St. Petersburg, following both the Russian Orthodox and Lutheran rites. The event was attended by Europe's leading royal families.

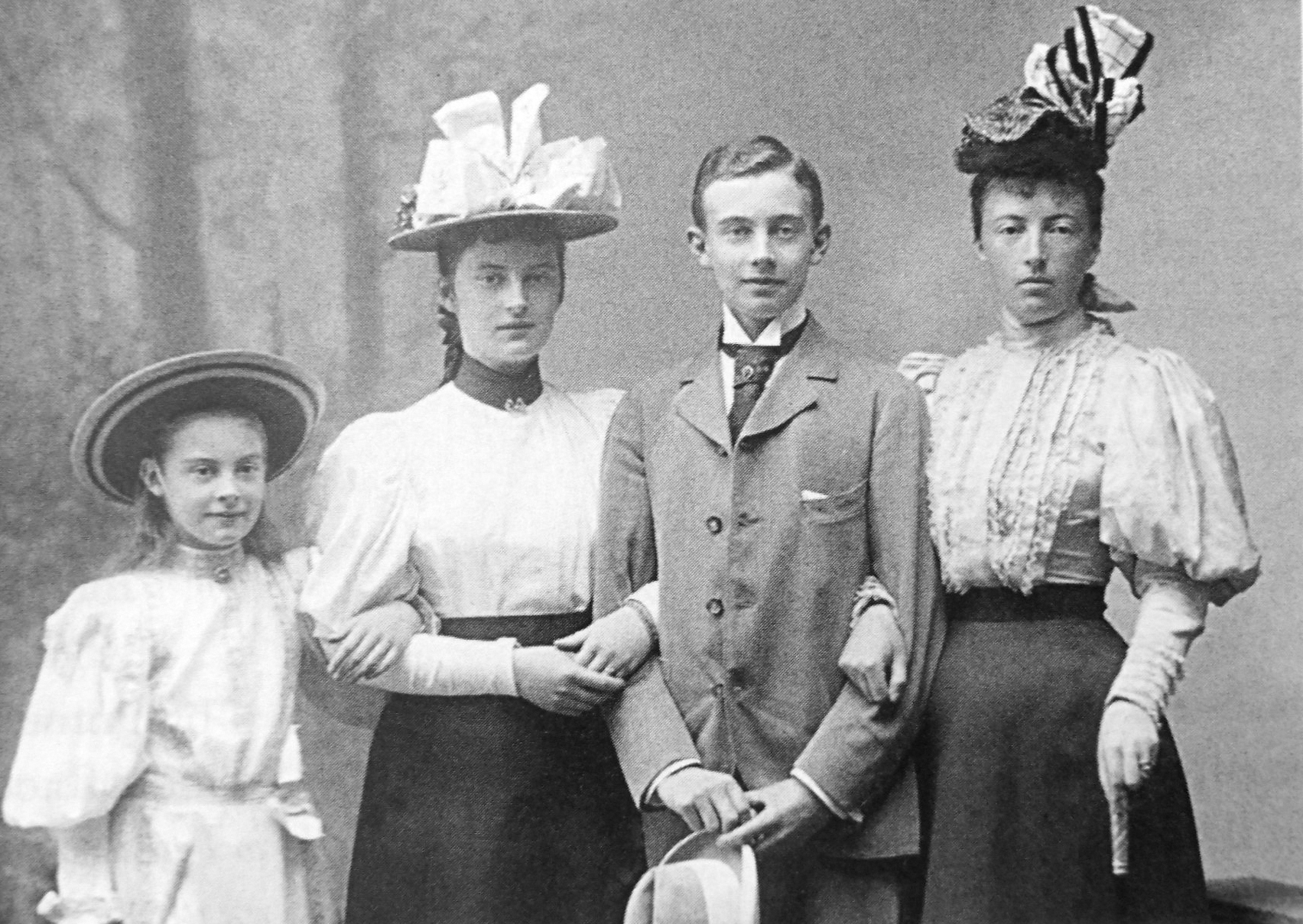
Grand Duchess Anastasia Mikhailovna of Russia with her three children: Cecilie, Alexandrine and Friedrich Franz.

Grand Duchess Anastasia Mikhailovna and her husband, Friedrich Franz III, Grand Duke of Mecklenburg-Schwerin, had three children:

- Duchess Alexandrine of Mecklenburg-Schwerin (24 December 1879 – 28 December 1952), who married King Christian X of Denmark on 26 April 1898. They had two sons.
- Frederick Francis IV, Grand Duke of Mecklenburg-Schwerin (9 April 1882 – 17 November 1945), who married Princess Alexandra of Hanover on 7 June 1904. They had five children.
- Duchess Cecilie of Mecklenburg-Schwerin (20 September 1886 – 6 May 1954), who married Wilhelm, German Crown Prince on 6 June 1905. They had six children.

Grand Duchess Anastasia Mikhailovna also had an illegitimate son with Vladimir Alexandrovich Paltov:

- Alexis Louis de Wenden (23 December 1902 – 7 July 1976), who married Paulette Seux on 25 January 1929. They had two daughters: Xénia Anastasie Germaine Louis de Wenden (1930 – 2021), and Anastasie Alexandrine Paule Louis de Wenden (1935 – 1995).

== Grand Duchess of Mecklenburg-Schwerin ==
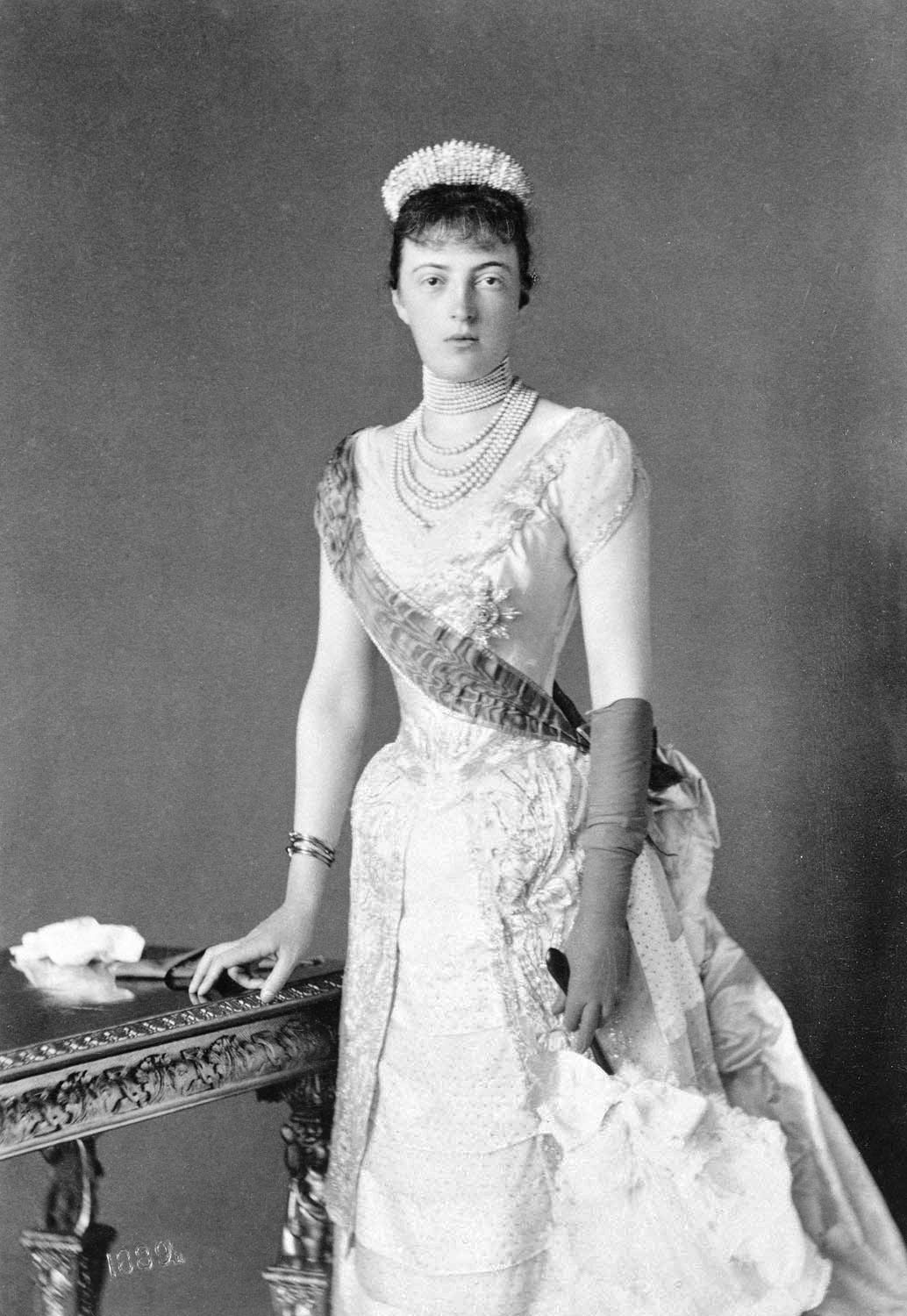
Anastasia as Grand Duchess of Mecklenburg-Schwerin, 1889

The couple arrived in Schwerin in February 1879, and settled at the Neustadt Palace. Anastasia was not permitted to decorate her apartments according to her tastes. The cold and outdated atmosphere of the Protestant German court contrasted sharply with the luxury she had known as a child. She did not love her husband, and though her mother was German (from southern Germany, unlike Mecklenburg in the north), she never overcame her aversion to her adopted country.

Anastasia soon became pregnant with her first child, a daughter named Alexandrine, born on 24 December 1879. Her husband's poor health provided an excuse to spend minimal time in Schwerin. The couple also resided in Palermo, where their second child, the future Grand Duke Frederick Francis IV, was born on 9 April 1882.

Following her father-in-law's death on April 15, 1883, and her husband's accession as Grand Duke Frederick Francis III, Anastasia was obliged to move to Schwerin, where they took up residences at Schwerin Castle and Ludwigslust Palace. While she fulfilled her formal duties, her husband's poor health meant they often returned to Italy or France. Due to public criticism of their frequent absences, a compromise was reached: they would reside in Schwerin five months a year, with children to be born there, while spending the remainder wherever they wished.

After the birth of her daughter Cécile in September 1886, Anastasia established residence in Cannes. Between 1887 and 1889, Frederick Francis III built Villa Wenden, an Italian-style residence overlooking the bay, which Anastasia preferred. During summers, she spent time at Gelbensande, an English-style hunting pavilion near the Baltic Sea. She educated her children with simplicity, granting her daughters and son more freedom than she had received. Anastasia spoke French to her husband and English to her children, was a skilled tennis player, and enjoyed Italian opera and theater. She maintained ties with European royalty visiting the Côte d'Azur but was increasingly distanced from stricter court circles due to her discreet affairs.

== Later life and death ==
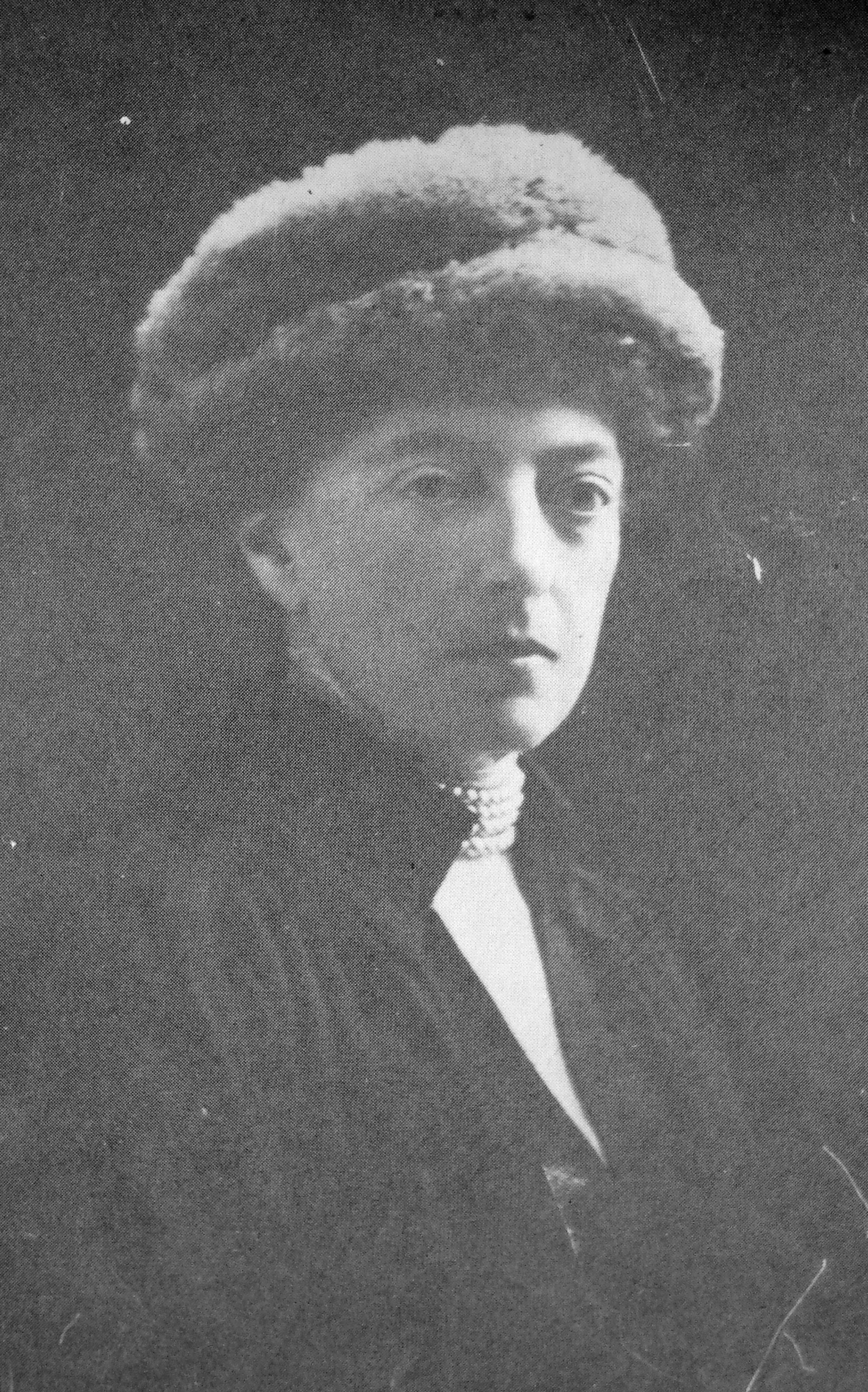
Grand Duchess Anastasia in her later years

Her mother, Grand Duchess Olga, died in 1891 upon learning of her son Michael's morganatic marriage. Anastasia comforted her father and maintained close relations with her brothers Nicholas and Michael. Known for her lavish spending, she favored life in Cannes and Monte Carlo, where she frequently gambled, earning both notoriety and criticism.

Her husband's health deteriorated, and he died suddenly on 10 April 1897, in an apparent suicide after throwing himself off a bridge. The official account claimed that he died in his garden, collapsing over a low wall when a sudden shortness of breath overcame him. Anastasia inherited his private fortune, Villa Wenden in Cannes, and Gelbensande hunting pavilion. Her brother-in-law John Albert served as regent until Frederick Francis IV came of age in 1901. Anastasia continued to divide her time between the Riviera and occasional visits to St. Petersburg, Paris, and England.

Her daughter Alexandrine married the Crown Prince Christian of Denmark (later King Christian X) in 1898. Her son Frederick Francis IV married Princess Alexandra of Hanover in 1904, and her daughter Cécile married Crown Prince Wilhelm of Prussia in 1905, allowing Anastasia to attend the Berlin ceremony despite tensions with Kaiser Wilhelm II.

In 1902, she caused a scandal when she had a child fathered by her personal secretary, Vladimir Alexandrovich Paltov. To conceal the pregnancy, she initially claimed that the abdominal swelling was caused by a tumour, and later said she had chickenpox and needed to be quarantined. Her son, Alexis Louis de Wenden was born in Nice on 23 December 1902. Anastasia raised the child herself, and frequently wrote to him when he was away for school. In her widowhood, she lived most of the year in the South of France.

Before World War I, Anastasia visited her brother Michael in England. When war broke out, she faced a difficult situation: her sons served in the German army while her brothers fought for Russia. During the war, French authorities, wary of her German connections, required her to leave Monaco and France. Unable to reside in France or return to Schwerin, she moved to neutral Switzerland, staying at the Hôtel Savoy in Lausanne and offering her villa in Cannes as a hospital for Russian officers. She kept occasional contact with her children through her eldest daughter, Alexandrine, in Denmark.

During the Russian Revolution, three of Anastasia's brothers Grand Dukes Sergei, Nicholas, and George Mikhailovich were killed by the Bolsheviks (1918–1919). The collapse of the German monarchy forced her son to abdicate in Schwerin in 1918, and Kaiser Wilhelm II also abdicated after fleeing to the Netherlands.

Anastasia was deeply critical of German militarism and detested Kaiser Wilhelm II (her daughter's father-in-law) so intensely that she stopped using her German royal title and reverted to her Russian identity. At the outbreak of the First World War, Anastasia publicly rejected her German son-in-law and affirmed her loyalty to Russia.

After the war, she returned to France with Princess Catherine Yurievskaya settling in Nice at Villa Fantasia in Èze. There, she established a charity to support Russian exiles displaced by the revolution. Despite her own exile and reduced circumstances, she remained a notable society figure, remembered for her sharp wit and cosmopolitan lifestyle.

In March 1922, after attending a reception hosted by her nephew Grand Duke Andrei Vladimirovich, she suffered a stroke and died on 11 March 1922, at her Villa Fantasia, aged sixty-one. Her children were present, reunited for the first time since the war. She was buried alongside her husband at Ludwigslust.

== Legacy ==
Her nephew-by-marriage, Felix Yusupov, described the Grand Duchess Anastasia Mikhailovna in his memoirs:

Although well over forty, she had lost none of her high spirits; she was kind and affectionate, but her eccentric and despotic nature made her rather formidable. She was an early riser and she used to telephone me at eight in the morning. If I happened to be out, she sent her servants all over Paris to look for me and sometimes took part in the search herself. I had to lunch, dine, go to the theater and supper with her almost every day. She usually slept through the first act of a play, and then woke up with a start to declare that the performance was stupid and that she wished to go somewhere else. We often changed theaters two or three times in one evening.

Her daughter, Crown Princess Cecilie, also wrote about her in her memoirs:

She was like an ivory statue, delicate and transparent, and at the same time tall and slender and stately in her bearing; she was possessed of great charm and was kind and friendly with everyone. [...] My grandmother, after whom I was named, had brought up her only daughter with exceptional strictness and had accustomed her to submit unconditionally to the will of her mother and of her governess.

Her brother, Grand Duke Alexander Mikhailovich of Russia, recalled his sister in his memoirs:

There remained our sister Anastasia. We worshiped that tall dark-haired girl who was the exclusive favorite of our father; but when talking to her, we liked to pose as the faithful knights ready and willing to execute the orders of their 'dame sans merci.' We put at her feet all the love stored during months and years of dull military drills. We were extremely jealous of her and felt a terrific heartache when the young Grand Duke of Mecklenburg-Schwerin came to Tiflis to make the acquaintance of his fiancée.

== Ancestry ==
Ancestors of Grand Duchess Anastasia Mikhailovna of Russia

8. Paul I of Russia
4. Nicholas I of Russia
9. Duchess Sophie Dorothea of Württemberg
2. Grand Duke Michael Nikolaevich of Russia
10. Frederick William III of Prussia
5. Princess Charlotte of Prussia
11. Duchess Louise of Mecklenburg-Strelitz
1. Grand Duchess Anastasia Mikhailovna of Russia
12. Charles Frederick, Grand Duke of Baden
6. Leopold, Grand Duke of Baden
13. Baroness Louise Caroline Geyer of Geyersberg
3. Princess Cecilie of Baden
14. Gustav IV Adolf of Sweden
7. Princess Sophie of Sweden
15. Princess Frederica of Baden

== Bibliography ==
- Alexander, Grand Duke of Russia. Once a Grand Duke. Cassell, London, 1932.
- Domin, Marie-Agnes. Anastasia Mikailovna Romanova, Editions Atlantica, 2002. ISBN 2-84394-546-1.
- Cockfield, Jamie H. White Crow. Praeger, 2002.
- Mateos Sainz de Medrano. Ricardo. A Child of The Caucasus. Royalty Digest, Vol 3, N 1. July 1993.
- Michael, Prince of Greece. Jewels of the Tsars. The Vedome Press, 2006.
- Yussupov, Felix. Lost Splendor, 1952.
- Zeepvat, Charlotte. The Camera and the Tsars. Sutton Publishing, 2004, ISBN 0-7509-3049-7.
- Zeepvat, Charlotte. The other Anastasia: A woman who loved and who lived. Royalty Digest Quarterly. N2 2006. ISSN 1653-5219.

Grand Duchess Anastasia Mikhailovna of Russia House of Romanov Born: 28 July 1860 Died: 11 March 1922
German royalty
Preceded by Princess Marie of Schwarzburg-Rudolstadt	Grand Duchess consort of Mecklenburg-Schwerin; 15 April 1883 – 10 April 1897	Vacant Title next held by Princess Alexandra of Hanover
