= Bryan Anastatia =

Curaçaoan footballer (born 1992)

Personal information
- Full name: Bryan Xavier Anastatia
- Date of birth: 14 July 1992 (age 34)
- Place of birth: Goes, Netherlands
- Height: 1.79 m (5 ft 10 in)
- Position: Defender

Team information
- Current team: CRKSV Jong Holland
- Number: 16

Senior career*
Years	Team	Apps	(Gls)
2010–	CRKSV Jong Holland		

International career^{‡}
2010	Netherlands Antilles	5	(1)
2011–	Curaçao	4	(0)
- * Club domestic league appearances and goals as of 3 January 2012 ‡ National team caps and goals as of 3 January 2012

Bryan Xavier Anastatia (born 14 July 1992) is a professional footballer who plays as a defender for CRKSV Jong Holland. Born in the Netherlands, he represents the Curaçao national football team.

== Club career ==
In 2010, he signed for Curaçao League side CRKSV Jong Holland.

== International career ==
=== Netherlands Antilles ===
On 13 October 2010 he made his debut for the Netherlands Antilles national football team in a match against the Suriname national football team in the 2010 Caribbean Championship.

=== Curaçao ===
On 20 August 2011 he made his debut for the Curaçao national football team in a friendly match against the Dominican Republic national football team.
