= Neustadt Palace =

Coordinates: 53.6312°N 11.4164°E

Neustadt Palace (German: Neustädtisches Palais)(also: Marienpalais) is a representative, magnificent building in the Schwerin Schelfstadt from the 18th century. The house at Puschkinstrasse 19 is a listed building. Since June 2006 it has been the headquarters for the Ministry of Justice of the state of Mecklenburg-Western Pomerania.

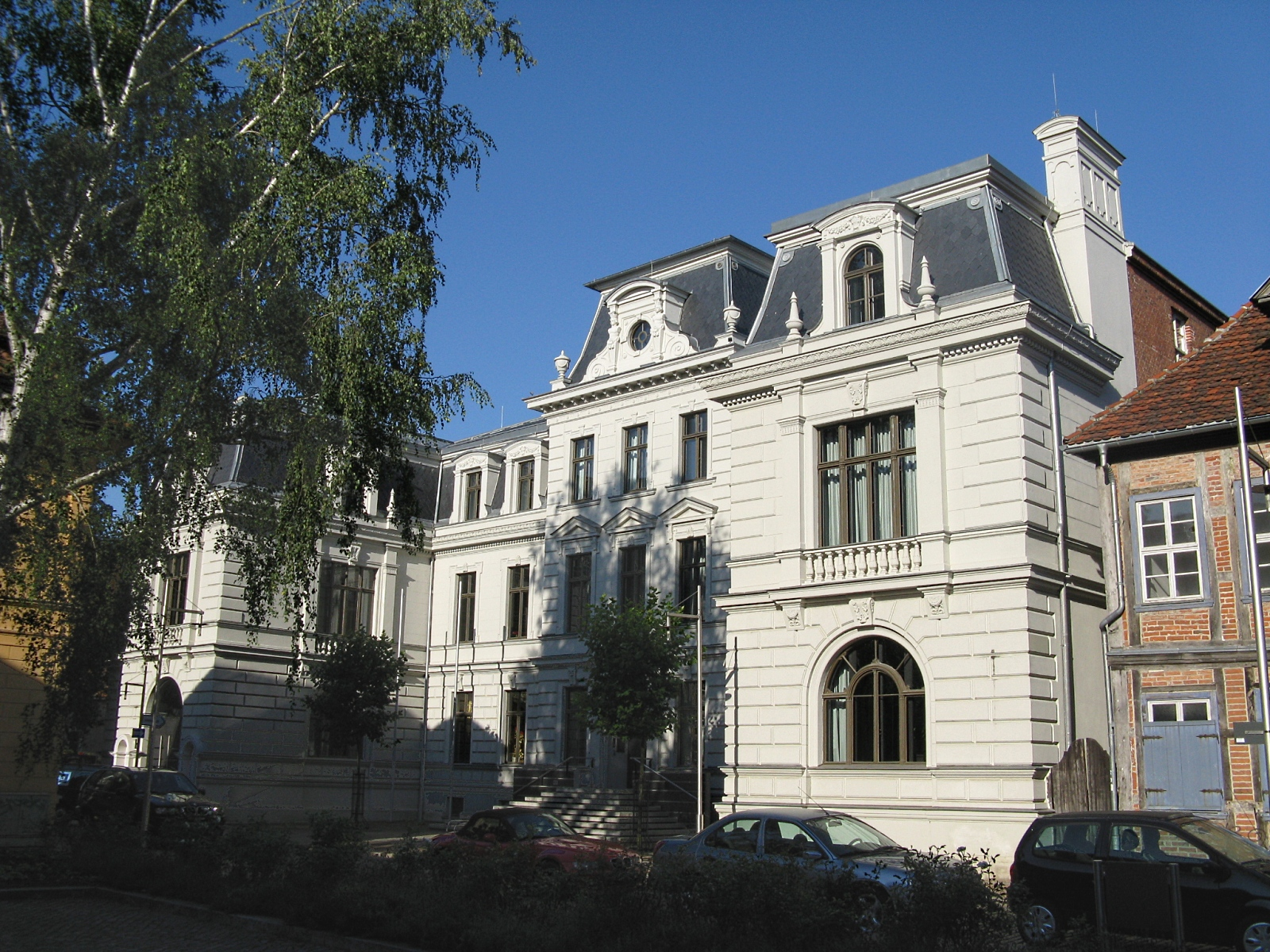
Neustadt Palace

== Architecture ==
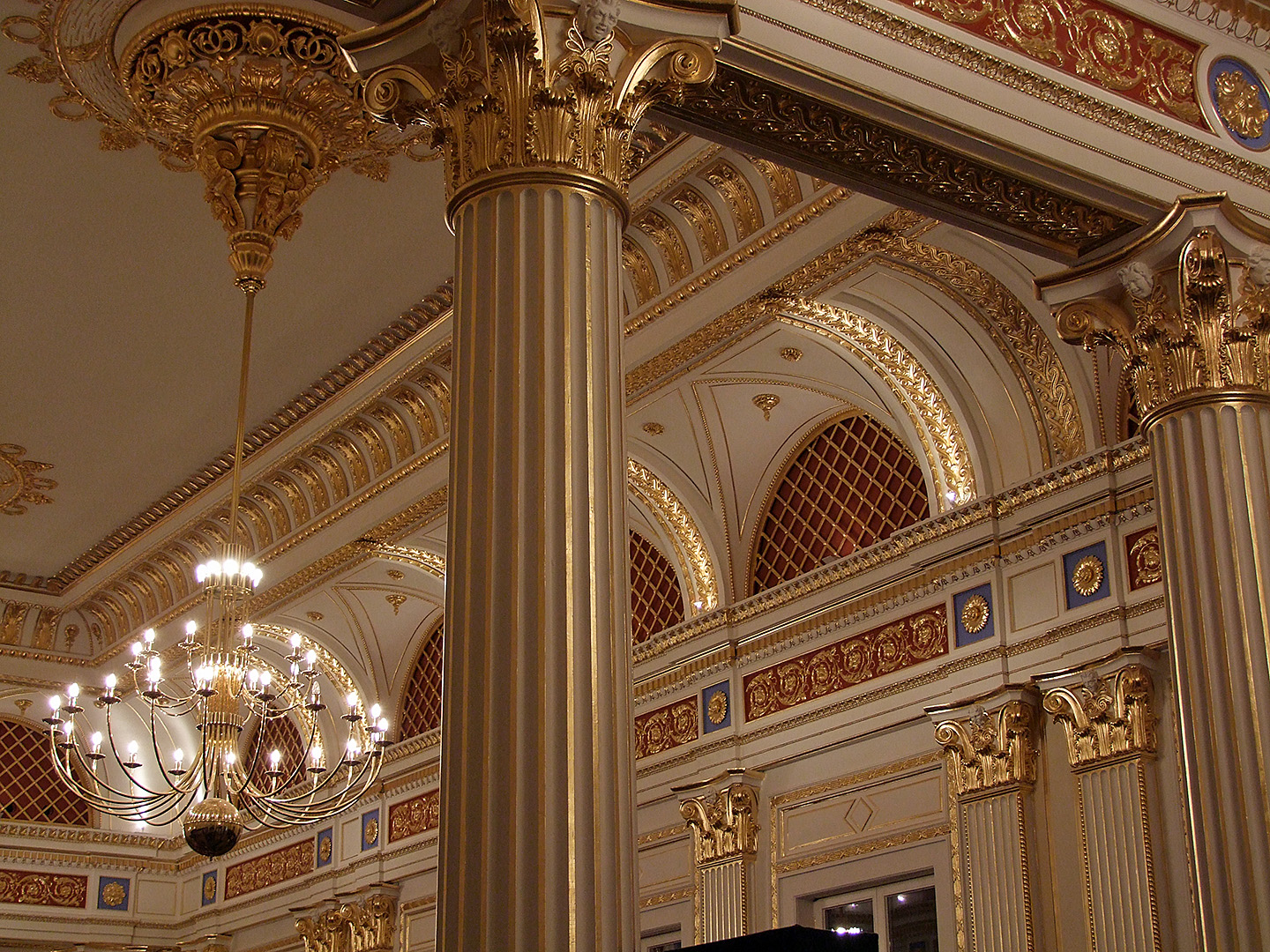
The Golden Hall in the Neustädtisches Palais from the period after 1877/78 after the renovation in 2006

The plastered building was built in 1779 according to plans by Johann Joachim Busch. A redesign of the Neustadt Palais in the style of the French Renaissance, which was largely equivalent to a new building, was carried out by Hermann Willebrand in 1877/78. The three-wing, two-story complex with a three-story central projection and the courtyard were preserved. The earlier mansard roof was replaced by a plateau roof with dormers. The facades were given strong plaster ashlar, strongly profiled cornices, herms and decorations in the form of festoons. Georg Adolph Demmler built a hall at the back in 1849, based on the throne room of Schwerin Castle. In 1883/84 Willebrand also added a residential wing to the rear for Duchess Marie.

The plastered facade contains elements of the Baroque and Renaissance. Inside, the cast iron stairs in the side stairwell, the stucco ceilings and the frame panel doors are worth mentioning.

== History ==
The property on which the palace now stands was acquired in 1708 by Friedrich Wilhelm for his brother Christian Ludwig II, on which the Prinzenhof (also Ludwigshof) was subsequently built. By order of the Duke Friedrich, the widow's residence was built on the site in 1779 for Charlotte Sophie, the wife of his brother Ludwig, who lived there until her death in 1810. After being vacant for ten years, the building was initially used by the Grand Ducal Finance Minister Leopold von Plessen and served as the Grand Ducal residence at the time of the Schwerin Palace renovations (1843–1857) and, after the extension from 1883, as the widow's residence of the Grand Duchess Marie. After the abdication of the last Grand Duke Frederick Francis IV, the palace became the property of the Free State of Mecklenburg-Schwerin in 1920.

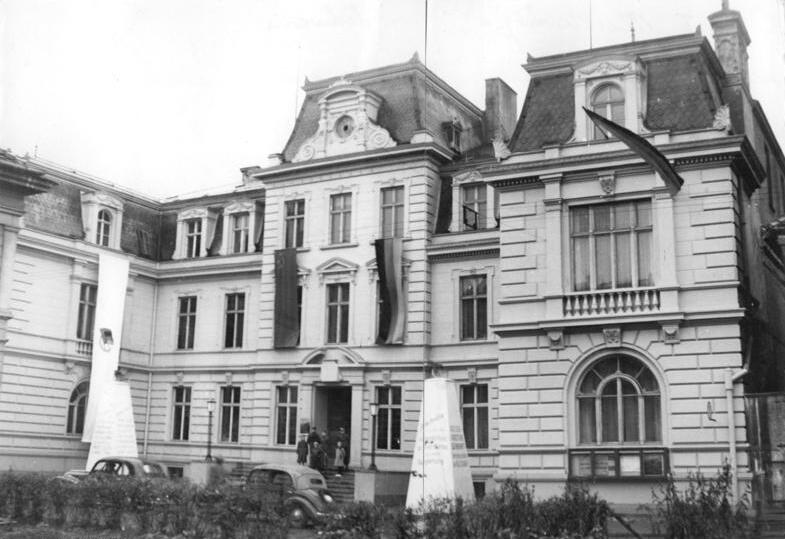
Palace as a house of German-Soviet friendship with appropriate flags

Various authorities were accommodated in the building until 1945. In 1947 it was made available to the Society for the Study of Culture of the Soviet Union for political-ideological and cultural-political work and renamed Maxim Gorki House (also: House of German-Soviet Friendship). Until the fall of the Wall, social and festive events regularly took place in the palace. The picture Triumph of Leninism hung in the entrance area. The Schwerin Craft Production Cooperative (PGH) "Drei Schilde", founded in October 1958, was significantly involved in the restoration of the Golden Hall in the Neustädtisches Palais and the Throne Room in Schwerin Castle in the 1970s. On the 35th anniversary of the founding of the GDR in October 1984, the PGH "Three Shields" was awarded the Patriotic Order of Merit in gold.

From 1990 to 1998, the Neustädtisches Palais was the seat of the city council and the mayor, after which it was empty again. From 2003 to 2008, the facility was extensively renovated for a total of 11.3 million euros. In June 2006, the Ministry of Justice of the state of Mecklenburg-Western Pomerania moved into the premises. A previously considered new building for the authority elsewhere was rejected. Subsequently, the Golden Hall was prepared, which is now available to the residents of Schwerin for celebrations and can be reached via a separate entrance. The hall reopened in April 2009. In 2010, a special prize was awarded for the reconstruction of the hall as part of the Mecklenburg-Western Pomerania State Building Prize.
