= Anastasia (disambiguation) =

Anastasia is a female given name of Greek origin, deriving from "Αναστασία", the Greek word for "resurrection".

Anastasia may also refer to:

== People ==
- Anastasia (surname)
- Grand Duchess Anastasia Nikolaevna of Russia
- Anastasia Gorshkova, Russian former competitive ice dancer

== Arts ==
=== Film ===
- Anastasia (1956 film), a historical drama film
- Anastasia: The Mystery of Anna (1986 film), an American-Austrian-Italian made for TV film depicting events from December, 1916 to 1938
- Anastasia (1997 film), an American animated musical film, loosely based on the life of Grand Duchess Anastasia Nikolaevna of Russia.
- Anastasia: Once Upon a Time, a 2020 film starring Emily Carey as Grand Duchess Anastasia Nikolaevna
- Anya (Anastasia), the main character of the 1997 animated film Anastasia and its 2016 stage musical adaptation, loosely based on Grand Duchess Anastasia Nikolaevna of Russia
- Anastasia Tremaine, one of Cinderella's stepsisters in the 1950 animated film Cinderella

=== Literature ===
- Anastasia "Ana" Steele, the female protagonist of the Fifty Shades trilogy

=== Music ===
- Anastasia (band), a Macedonian music group
- Anastasia (soundtrack), the soundtrack to the 1997 film
- "Anastasia", a song by Slash from the album Apocalyptic Love
- "Anastasia" (song), the theme song of the 1956 film Anastasia, with the most popular version having been recorded by Pat Boone, 1956

=== Stage ===
- Anastasia (ballet), a one-act ballet premiered in 1967
- Anastasia (musical), an American stage musical adapted from the 1997 animated musical film

=== Television ===
- "Anastasia" (Boardwalk Empire), an episode of the television series Boardwalk Empire
- Anastasia (TV series), a Greek television series of the 1993–94 season
- Anastasia "Jane Vaughn" Valieri, a fictional character in Degrassi: The Next Generation

== Places ==
- Anastasia Island, an island off the northeast Atlantic coast of Florida in the US
- Anastasia, Alberta, small hamlet in Alberta, Canada
- St. Anastasia Island, a Bulgarian islet in the Black Sea
- 824 Anastasia, a minor planet (asteroid) orbiting the Sun

== Ships ==
- MV Anastasia, a Liberian tanker in service 1947-55
- Anastasia (yacht), a super-yacht

== Other ==
- Air Anastasia (callsign ANASTASIA); see List of airline codes (A)
- Ringing Cedars' Anastasianism, new religious movement

== See also ==
- Anestasia Vodka
- Lady Anastasia (disambiguation)
- Princess Anastasia (disambiguation)
- Sant'Anastasia (disambiguation)
- Saint Anastasia (disambiguation)
- Anastase
- Anastacia (disambiguation)
- Anastatia (disambiguation)
- Anesthesia (disambiguation)
- Anna (disambiguation)
- Anya (disambiguation)
- Nastja
