= Alexandra of the United Kingdom (disambiguation) =

Alexandra of the United Kingdom (1844–1925) was the queen consort of Edward VII.

Alexandra of the United Kingdom or Alexandra of Great Britain may also refer to:

- Princess Alexandra of Saxe-Coburg and Gotha (1878–1942), granddaughter of Queen Victoria and British princess by birth
- Princess Alexandra of Hanover (1882–1963), great-great-granddaughter of George III and British princess by birth until her title was removed
- Princess Alexandra, 2nd Duchess of Fife (1891–1959), granddaughter of Edward VII
- Princess Alexandra of Kent (born 1936), granddaughter of George V

== See also ==
- British princesses with a middle name of Alexandra:
  - Louise, Princess Royal (1867–1931)
  - Princess Victoria of the United Kingdom (1868–1935)
  - Marie of Edinburgh (1875–1938)
  - Mary, Princess Royal and Countess of Harewood (1897–1965)
  - Elizabeth II (1926–2022; r. 1952–2022)
- Princess Alexandrina Victoria of Kent (1819–1901; r. 1837–1901), appellation of Queen Victoria before her reign
- Alexander of Scotland (disambiguation)
- Princess Alexandra (disambiguation)
- Queen Alexandra (disambiguation)
