= Alexandra of Russia =

Alexandra of Russia may refer to:

- Irina Godunova (1557–1603), Tsaritsa of Russia whose monastic name was Alexandra
- Alexandra Feodorovna (disambiguation), various empresses
- Alexandra Romanova (disambiguation), various grand duchesses

== See also ==
- Alexandra Pavlovna Galitzine (1905–2006), first wife of Prince Rostislav Alexandrovich of Russia from 1928 to 1944
- Alexander of Russia (disambiguation)
- Empress Alexandra (disambiguation)
- Princess Alexandra (disambiguation)
