= Alexandra Romanova =

Alexandra Romanova may refer to:

== Romanovs by birth ==
- Grand Duchess Alexandra Pavlovna of Russia (1783–1801), eldest daughter of Paul I, Emperor of Russia
- Grand Duchess Alexandra Nikolaevna of Russia (1825–1844), third daughter of Nicholas I, Emperor of Russia
- Grand Duchess Alexandra Mikhailovna of Russia (1831–1832), granddaughter of Paul I, Emperor of Russia
- Grand Duchess Alexandra Alexandrovna of Russia (1842–1849), eldest daughter of Alexander II, Emperor of Russia

== Romanovs by marriage ==
- Alexandra Feodorovna (disambiguation), various empresses
- Princess Alexandra of Saxe-Altenburg (1830–1911), wife of Grand Duke Konstantin Nikolayevich of Russia
- Duchess Alexandra of Oldenburg (1838–1900), wife of Grand Duke Nicholas Nikolaevich of Russia
- Princess Alexandra of Greece and Denmark (1870–1891), first wife of Grand Duke Paul Alexandrovich of Russia

== See also ==
- Alexandra Pavlovna Galitzine (1905–2006), first wife of Prince Rostislav Alexandrovich of Russia from 1928 to 1944
- Alexander Romanov (disambiguation)
- Alexandra of Russia (disambiguation)
- Princess Alexandra (disambiguation)
