= Alexandra of Greece and Denmark =

Alexandra of Greece and Denmark may refer to:

- Princess Alexandra of Greece and Denmark (1870–1891), eldest daughter of George I, King of the Hellenes
- Alexandra of Yugoslavia (1921–1993), born Princess Alexandra of Greece and Denmark

== See also ==
- Princess Alexandra of Greece (born 1968), eldest child of Prince Michael of Greece and Denmark and Marina, Consort of Prince Michael of Greece and Denmark
- Alexander of Greece (disambiguation)
- Alexandra of Glucksburg (disambiguation)
- Princess Alexandra of Denmark (disambiguation)
- Princess Alexandra (disambiguation)
