= Emperor Alexander =

Emperor Alexander may refer to:

- Alexander the Great (326-323 BCE), a Macedonian king who conquered the known world
- Alexander Severus (208–235), a Roman emperor (222-235) of the Severan dynasty
- Domitius Alexander, Roman usurper who declared himself emperor in 311
- Alexander (Byzantine emperor) (ca. 870–913), Byzantine emperor (912–913)
- Alexander of Trebizond (ca. 1405–1459), Trapezuntine co-emperor (ca. 1451–1459)
- Alexander I of Russia (1777–1825), Russian emperor (1801–1825)
- Alexander II of Russia (1818–1881), Russian emperor (1855–1881)
- Alexander III of Russia (1845–1894), Russian emperor (1881–1894)

== See also ==
- Emperor Alexius (disambiguation)
- King Alexander (disambiguation)
- Emperor Alexander (ship) - any of at least six vessels named for Alexander I of Russia
