= Nicholas Maximilianovitch, 4th Duke of Leuchtenberg =

Duke of Leuchtenberg from 1852 to 1891

Nicholas Maximilianovitch
- Duke of Leuchtenberg; Prince Romanovsky
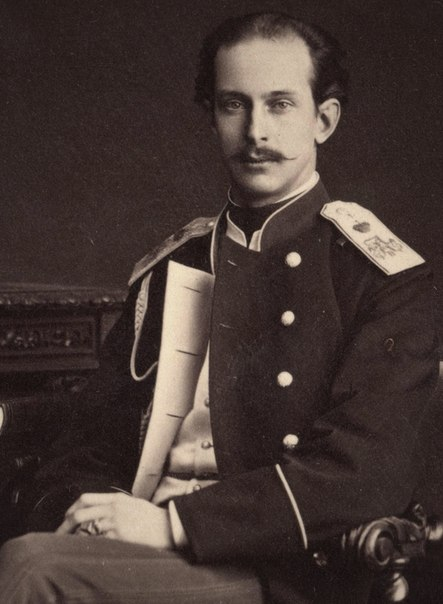

Duke of Leuchtenberg
- Reign: 1 November 1852 – 6 January 1891
- Predecessor: Maximilian de Beauharnais
- Successor: Eugen Maximilianovich
- Born: 4 August 1843; Sergievka, Russian Empire
- Died: 6 January 1891 (aged 47); 8th arrondissement of Paris, France
- Burial: 24 January 1891; Chapel of Resurrection, Coastal Monastery of Saint Sergius
- Spouse: Nadezhda Annenkova (m. 1868) (Note: Officially in 1878)
- Issue: Duke Georgy Nikolayevich of Leuchtenberg; Duke Nicolas Nicolayevitch of Leuchtenberg
Names
- Nicholas Maximilianovich Romanowsky
- House: Beauharnais
- Father: Maximilian de Beauharnais, 3rd Duke of Leuchtenberg
- Mother: Grand Duchess Maria Nikolaevna of Russia
- Religion: Russian Orthodoxy

Prince Nicholas Maximilianovitch, 4th Duke of Leuchtenberg (4 August 1843 - 6 January 1891) was a Russian Prince and soldier who was the 4th Duke of Leuchtenberg from 1852 until his death in 1891. Head of the House of Beauharnais, he was a grandson of Nicholas I of Russia and was a candidate for the throne of Greece and of Romania. Like his father, he was also a renowned mineralogist.

Son of Maximilian de Beauharnais, 3rd Duke of Leuchtenberg and of Grand Duchess Maria Nikolaevna of Russia, Nicholas grew up in Russia. He followed a military career but also studied mineralogy, geology and palaeontology. His was a candidate for the throne of Greece in 1862 and for Romania in 1866 but his links with Russia meant he did not accede to either.

Appointed President of the Imperial Society of Mineralogy and Honorary President of the Russian Society of Technology in 1865 by Tsar Alexander II, he carried out several scientific missions in Russia. His relationship with Nadezhda Annenkova led him to flee the country in 1868. Deprived of his fortune and abandoned by his family, he was later partially forgiven by his uncle. He spent the rest of his life in exile and died at the age of 47 of throat cancer.

== Family ==
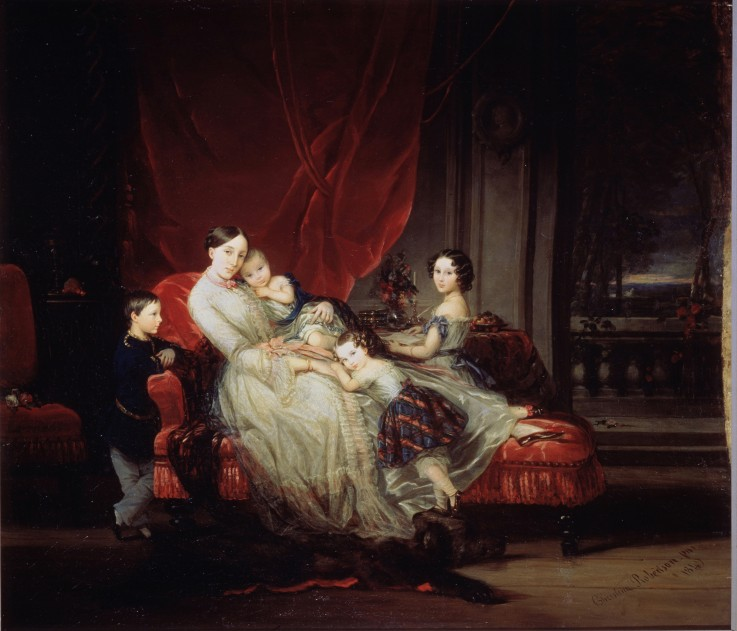
Grand Duchess Maria Nikolaevna of Russia, with her four eldest children by Christina Robertson in 1849. From left to right, Nicholas, Eugen, Eugenia and Maria.

Nicholas was the eldest son of Maximilian de Beauharnais and Grand Duchess Maria Nikolaevna of Russia. His father was the grandson of Joséphine de Beauharnais, the first wife of Napoleon and also a grandson of Maximilian I Joseph of Bavaria. His mother was the granddaughter of Paul I of Russia and of Frederick William Ill of Prussia.

== Biography ==
=== Childhood and education ===
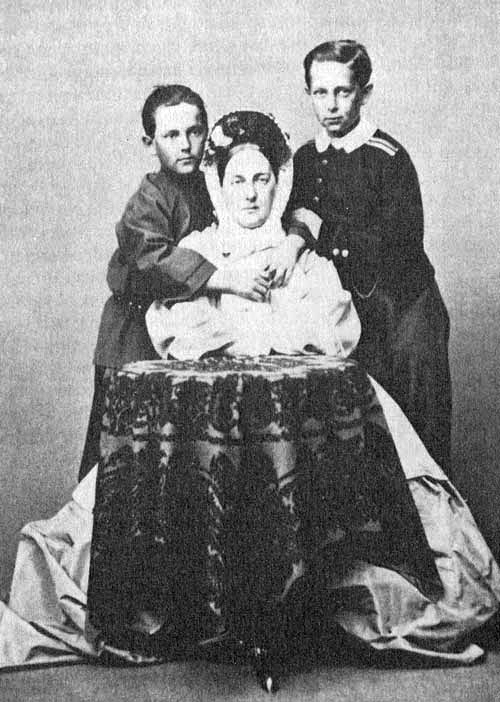
Nicholas with his younger brother, Sergei, and his mother c. 1850s

The first grandson of Tsar Nicholas I, Nicholas was born in a Dacha on the Serguievka estate near Petergof in Russia on 4 August 1843. His birth was difficult and he was born with one leg shorter than the other. This disability later led his parents to seek orthopaedic treatments abroad. During his childhood, he underwent no less than four operations on his leg in Germany and the United Kingdom before being entrusted to the care of Dr Nikolay Pirogov, who proscribed him gymnastic exercises. Due to this program, Nicholas grew almost normally and he no longer had this physical problem.

Following the promise his grandfather made upon his parents' marriage, Nicholas received the style of Imperial Highness and title of Prince Romanovsky. Although being a part of the Imperial family, he was not entitled to any appanage. However, his parents had a large fortune and received a pension from the Tsar. After the death of his father, Maximilian de Beauharnais, in 1852, the family sold their property abroad in order to provide income for Nicholas and his siblings.

After his father's death while he was still aged 9, Nicholas became very attached to his mother whom he spoke Russian with despite most members of his class preferring French. In 1854, his mother secretly remarried to Count Grigori Aleksandrovich Stroganov, and Nicholas maintained cordial relations with his step father. Nicolas was also close to his uncle, Tsar Alexander II, who often took Nicholas on trips with the Imperial family in Russia or abroad. He was also close with his first cousin, the Tsesarevich Nicholas Alexandrovich, with whom he spent a lot of time.

Nicholas received his education supervised by Colonel Rebinder. His tutors also included several artists such as Nikolai Tikhobrazov, who taught him in drawing and painting. His interest in science saw him take courses at the University of St. Petersburg from 1860, whilst pursuing a military career at the same time.

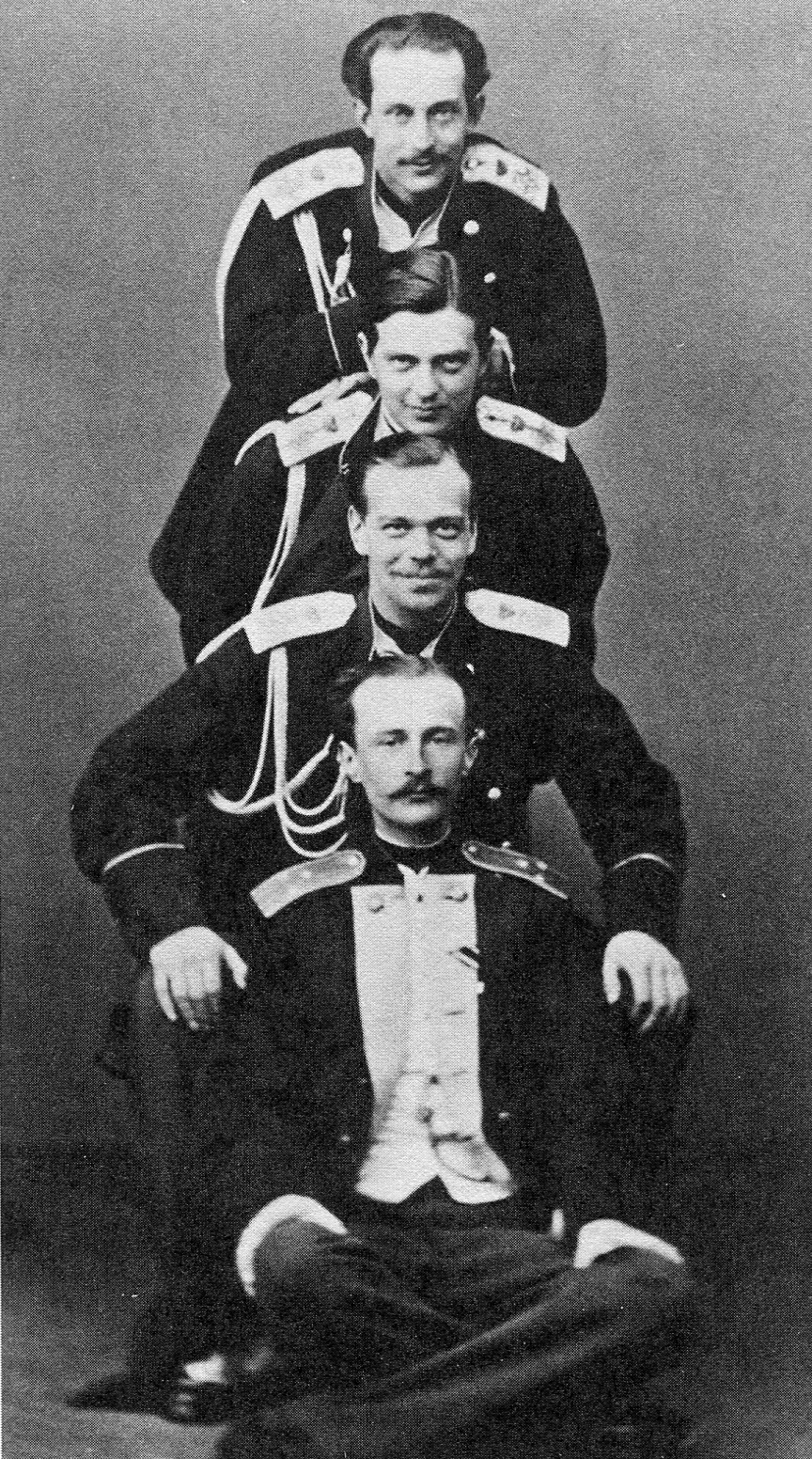
Nicholas (top), along with his cousins Vladimir, Alexander and Albert in the early 1860s.

=== Claim to the Greek throne ===
In the 1850s and the 1860s, the Kingdom of Greece faced a succession crisis as King Otto and Queen Amalia of Oldenburg had no children. The constitution required that one of the monarch's brothers, Luitpold or Adalbert, to be proclaimed the heir to the throne. However, both were of Catholic faith and refused to convert to the Church of Greece. As Otto unsuccessfully attempted to persuade his brothers to raise at least one of their children in orthodoxy, the Greek population began to consider a change of dynasty. As early as 1858, placards were placed in the Greek capital to demand the appointment of Nicholas as the heir. As a cousin of the King and of Orthodox faith, the supporters of the Russian Party considered Nicholas as the ideal heir to the throne.

A revolution broke out on 18 October 1862 and King Otto was overthrown. An assembly was the convened to elect a new monarch. In Greece, two names circulated to succeed Otto. The English Party supported Prince Alfred, the second son of Queen Victoria, while the Russian party still supported Nicholas. The candidacy of Prince Alfred offered the hope of the attachment of the Ionian Islands to Greece and the possibility of a rapprochement with the United Kingdom. The candidacy of Nicholas had only the advantage of religion and his ties with Russia.

However the London Conference of 1832 prohibited the ruling houses of England, Russia and France from acceding to the Greek throne. Therefore, Prince Alfred was clearly excluded from the succession. However, it was not the same for Nicholas whom Russia still considered a candidate as he was not a Romanov while the United Kingdom wanted to exclude him because of his ties with the Tsar. For several weeks, tensions between the two countries grew as Russia refused to exclude Nicholas from the succession. The United Kingdom later threatened to accept Prince Alfred's candidacy and the majority of the population of Greece were in favour of Prince Alfred's candidacy. Faced with the risk of Prince Alfred's accession, the Russian government officially abandoned the candidacy on Nicholas on 2 December. The following day, Queen Victoria renounced her son's candidacy and on 4 December an agreement on this was signed between the two countries. It was eventually Prince William of Denmark who became King of the Hellenes on 30 March 1863.

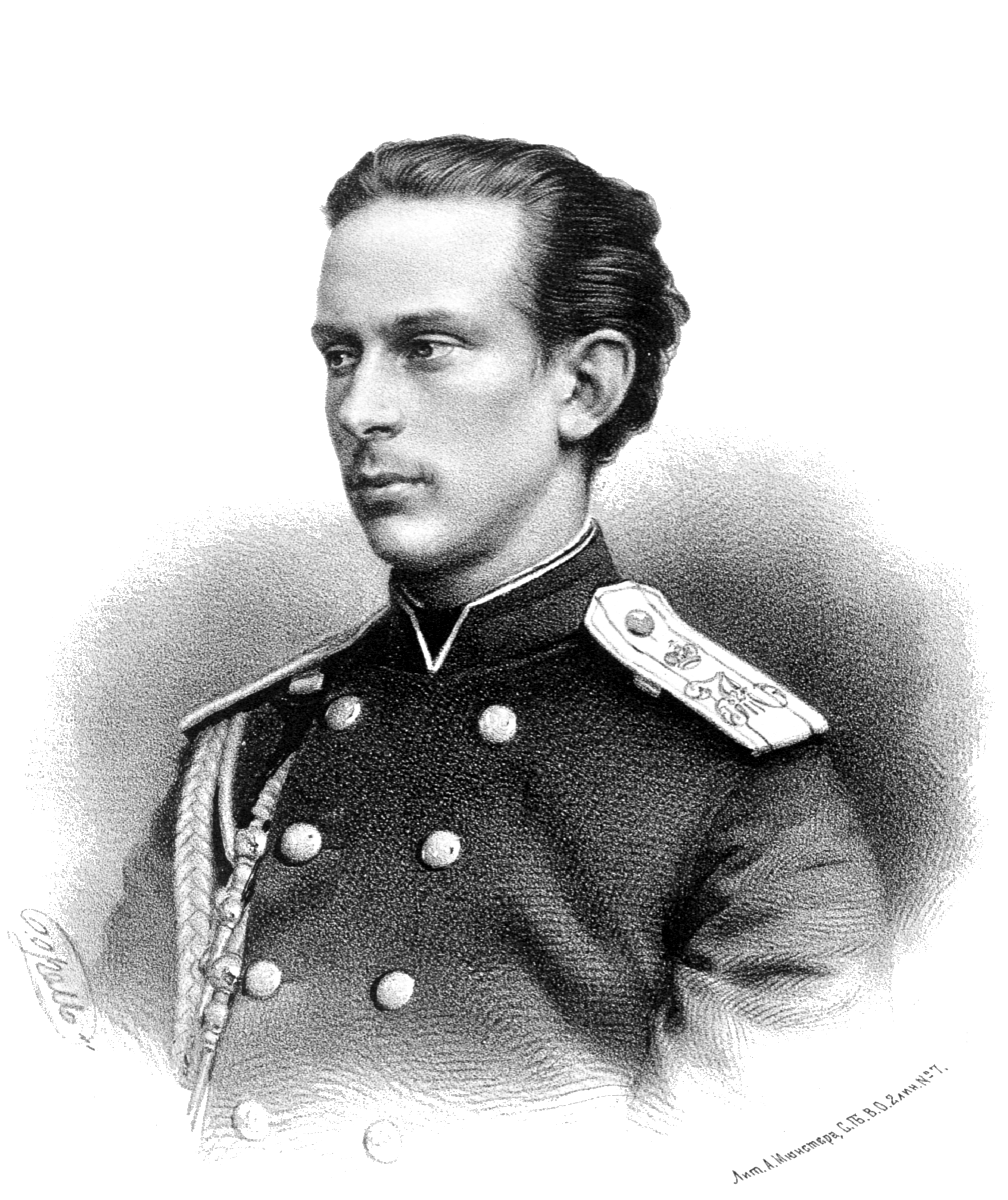
Nicholas c. 1867

=== Claim to the Romanian throne ===
At the beginning of March 1866, Nicholas was considered for the Romanian throne in order to resolve the Eastern question in favour of Russia. However the selection of a foreign Prince who was closely linked with the Romanovs contradicted the Paris conference on 1858. Being a nephew and therefore too close a relative of Tsar Alexander II, Nicholas would appear to be a "Russian governor" in the eyes of Romanian politicians and guarantor powers. Moreover, the Tsar stated that he would not accept a member of his family becoming a vassal of the Sultan. In the United Kingdom, William Gladstone announced that the Sublime Porte and the Protecting Powers would be meeting in conference to discuss the election to the Romanian throne but already warned that the clauses of the Treaty of Paris must be respected. Following these conditions, Prince Karl of Hohenzollern-Sigmaringen became the Domnitor of Romania on 20 April 1866.

=== Career in Russia ===
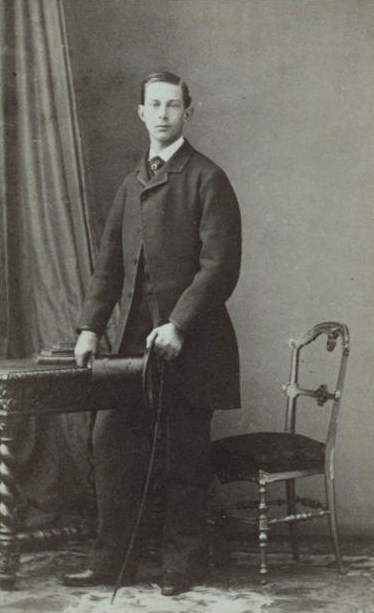
Nicholas c. 1860s

Nicholas had a career in the military. Since his birth, he was in the Preobrazhensky Life Guards Regiment. In 1850, he became ensign and in 1852 he was appointed chief of the Kiev Hussar Regiment. In 1856 he enlisted in the Life Guards of the 4th Rifle Imperial Surami Battalion. In 1859, he entered active military service. In 1863, he became Colonel and Major General in 1865. He became Lieutenant General in 1878 and Cavalry General in 1890 and Adjutant General the same year. He fought in the Russo-Turkish War of 1877 to 1878.

Like his father, he had an interest mineralogy, geology and palaeontology and published various articles on the subjects. In 1865, he was appointed by the Tsar, President of the Imperial Society of Mineralogy and it was under the direction of Nicholas that a geological map of the Russian Empire was drawn up. Nicholas also held several other positions. He was appointed an executive member of the St. Petersburg School of Mines, a member of the Academic Council of the Ministry of State Property and honorary President of the Russian Society of Technology.

=== Marriage and children ===
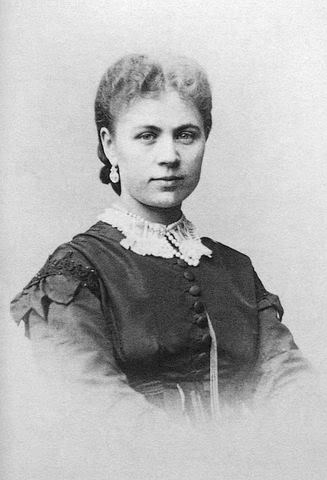
Nicholas's wife Nadezhda in the 1870s

In 1863, when Nicholas was 20 years old, he met Nadezhda Annenkova in Moscow, daughter of the minor Russian nobleman Sergei Petrovich Annenkov and his wife, Ekaterina Dmtrievna Shidlovskaya. Her paternal grandmother was Princess Anna Dmitrievna Prozorovskaya, granddaughter of Russian Field Marshall Prince Alexander Prozorovsky. She had separated from her husband, Vladimir Nikolayevich Akinfov, and had two daughters. She was known to have caught the interest of several men, including Alexander Gorchakov, one of his sons and two Grand Dukes. Nicholas later established a relationship with her.

After some time, the couple sought to formalise their relationship. Nadezhda therefore tried to obtain a divorce from her husband and repeatedly left St. Petersburg to convince her husband to officially accept their separation in exchange for money. Russian law recognized divorce, but prohibited spouses from remarrying or from being received at court except under specific circumstances. Tsar Alexander II opposed her divorce, as he did not want to see her unite with Nicolas.

The situation of the couple finally changed in 1868 when Nadezhda became pregnant and Nicholas convinced his uncle to let her leave Russia so that the unborn child does not bear the name of the husband of Nadezhda. Therefore, she left for Britain and Nicholas was punished by the Tsar for his part. The Tsar told Nicholas that if he leaves to find refuge in Europe, he will lose his Russian nationality, his fortune and his rank. Despite this, Nicholas leaves for Germany through Lithuania. The couple met in Paris and marry in the Orthodox Chapel of the Stein Castle in Bavaria.

In Russia, the actions of Nicholas caused a huge scandal and the Tsar was furious as he needed to cover the dishonor caused by Nicholas' desertion from the army. Nicholas' mother, Grand Duchess Maria, despite her morganatic marriage, was particularly shocked by his actions and refused to intervene in favor of Nicholas with the Tsar. Nicholas' siblings considered his actions deplorable and break their relations with him.

The couple had two children together:

- Duke Nicholas Nikolaevich of Leuchtenberg (1868-1928), who married Countess Maria Nikolaevna Grabbe (1869-1948) and had seven children.
- Duke Georgy Nikolaevich of Leuchtenberg (1872-1929), who married Princess Olga Nikolayevna Repnina-Volkonskaïa (1872-1953) and had six children.

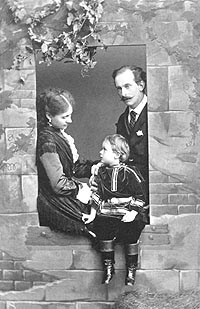
Nicholas with his wife and eldest son c. 1872

=== Exile ===
The eldest son of Nicholas and Nadezhda was born in Geneva, Switzerland on 17 October 1868. Since his parents' marriage was still secret, he was not recognised by Nicholas and was presented as his pupil. Their second son, also presented as a pupil, was born in Rome, Italy on 10 December 1872. The two children were legitimatised following their parents' official marriage in 1878.

For several years, the family split their time between Rome and Paris. The financial situation of the family was difficult after the Tsar deprived Nicholas of his fortune and with his mother refusing to help him. However, the situation of the family improved in 1873. That year, Nicholas inherited the Stein castle following the death his aunt, Amélie of Leuchtenberg, Dowager Empress of Brazil and the family then settled there. In 1876, Nicholas managed to expand his estate in Bavaria following the death of another of his aunts, Josephine of Leuchtenberg, due to buying from her heirs small properties in Neureuth and Seeon-Seebruck.

Despite being ostracised from European society, Nicholas and Nadezhda continued their life in Stein. With their passion about the arts and sciences, they received many intellectuals including the mineralogist, Nikolai Kokcharov, and many members of the Imperial Society of Mineralogy. Despite this, their financial situation remained precarious and Nicholas missed his life in Russia.

=== Improved relations with Russia ===
In 1876, Nicholas was allowed to return to Russia for the first time since fleeing in order to attend the funeral of his mother. However he went on his own as neither his wife nor his son was allowed to enter Russian territory. A year later, he was again allowed to return to Russia to serve in the Imperial Army in the Russo-Turkish War of 1877 to 1878.

The loyalty of Nicholas led to him being forgiven by his uncle in 1879. Tsar Alexander II recognised his marriage to Nadezhda and granted her a title which the French government objected to. However, the couple were not allowed to settle in Russia and the position of their children remained unclear. Later on, during Nicholas' illness, Tsar Alexander II issued a Ukase on 23 November 1890 which granted Nicholas' two sons the title of Leuchtenberg with the style of Highness although they were excluded from the Imperial family.

=== Illness and death ===
Over his later years, Nicholas' health deteriorated. He was a frequent smoker, and developed throat cancer which made him suffer greatly. Rumours suggested that he was dependent on morphine given to him by his wife. Nicholas died in Paris on 6 January 1891, at the age of 47. He then received military honours from the French government and then was repatriated to Russia by his brother Eugen.

Nicholas received an official funeral in the presence of Tsar Alexander III, the court and many scientists on 24 January 1891. His mortal remains were buried in the crypt of the Chapel of Resurrection of the Coastal Monastery of Saint Sergius. His wife died six months later and was also buried there.

== Ancestry ==
Ancestors of Nicholas Maximilianovitch, 4th Duke of Leuchtenberg

8. Alexandre, vicomte de Beauharnais
4. Eugène de Beauharnais, 1st Duke of Leuchtenberg
9. Joséphine Tascher de La Pagerie
2. Maximilian de Beauharnais, 3rd Duke of Leuchtenberg
10. Maximilian I Joseph of Bavaria
5. Princess Amalia Augusta of Bavaria
11. Princess Augusta Wilhelmine of Hesse-Darmstadt
Nicolas Maximilianovitch, 4th Duke of Leuchtenberg
12. Paul I of Russia
6. Nicholas I of Russia
13. Duchess Sophie Dorothea of Württemberg
3. Grand Duchess Maria Nikolaevna of Russia
14. Frederick William III of Prussia
7. Princess Charlotte of Prussia
15. Louise of Mecklenburg-Strelitz

== See also ==
- Russian nobility
- House of Romanov
- Morganatic marriage
