= Alexandra Feodorovna =

Alexandra Feodorovna may refer to:

- Alexandra Feodorovna (Charlotte of Prussia) (1798–1860), Empress of Russia by marriage to Nicholas I, Emperor of Russia
- Alexandra Feodorovna (Alix of Hesse) (1872–1918), Empress of Russia by marriage to Nicholas II, Emperor of Russia

== See also ==
- Aleksandra Fedoriva (born 1988), Russian athlete
- Aleksandr Fyodorov (disambiguation)
- Alexandra of Russia (disambiguation)
- Alexandra Romanova (disambiguation)
- Empress Alexandra (disambiguation)
