= Eugen Maximilianovich, 5th Duke of Leuchtenberg =

Duke of Leuchtenberg from 1891 to 1901

Eugen Maximilianovich
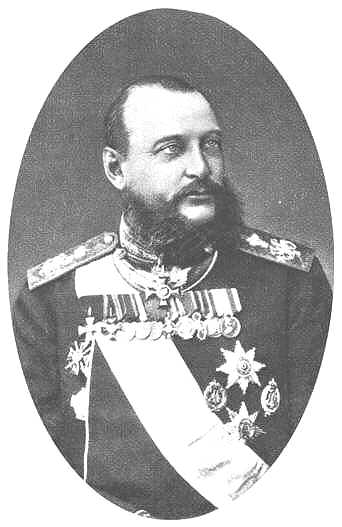

Duke of Leuchtenberg
- Reign: 6 January 1891 – 31 August 1901
- Predecessor: Nicholas Maximilianovitch
- Successor: George Maximilianovich
- Born: 8 February 1847; St. Petersburg, Russian Empire
- Died: 31 August 1901 (aged 54); St. Petersburg, Russian Empire
- Burial: Alexander Nevsky Lavra, St. Petersburg
- Spouse: Daria Konstantinova Opochinina (m. 1869; died 1870) Zinaida Dmitrievna Skobeleva (m. 1878; died 1899)
- Issue: Daria, Countess of Beauharnais
Names
- Eugen Maximilianovich Romanowsky
- House: House of Beauharnais
- Father: Maximilian de Beauharnais, 3rd Duke of Leuchtenberg
- Mother: Grand Duchess Maria Nikolaevna of Russia

Prince Eugen Maximilianovich Romanowsky, 5th Duke of Leuchtenberg (8 February 1847 – 31 August 1901) was a son of Maximilian de Beauharnais, 3rd Duke of Leuchtenberg and his wife, Grand Duchess Maria Nikolaevna of Russia. He succeeded his brother Nicholas Maximilianovich as the next Duke of Leuchtenberg, from 1891 until his death.

== Early life ==
Eugen Maximilianovich was born in Saint Petersburg in 1847, as the second son and fifth child of Maximilian de Beauharnais, 3rd Duke of Leuchtenberg and Grand Duchess Maria Nikolaevna of Russia. After the death of his father in 1852, Eugen's older brother Nicolas became the fourth Duke of Leuchtenberg. When Nicolas died without an heir in 1891, Eugen became the fifth Duke, until his death in 1901. He was then succeeded by his younger brother George.

On 18 December 1852, after the death of their father, all the children of Duke Maximilian were allowed to wear the princely name and title of Romanowsky (or Romanovskaya for the female descendants), and were styled Imperial Highness.

== Marriages ==
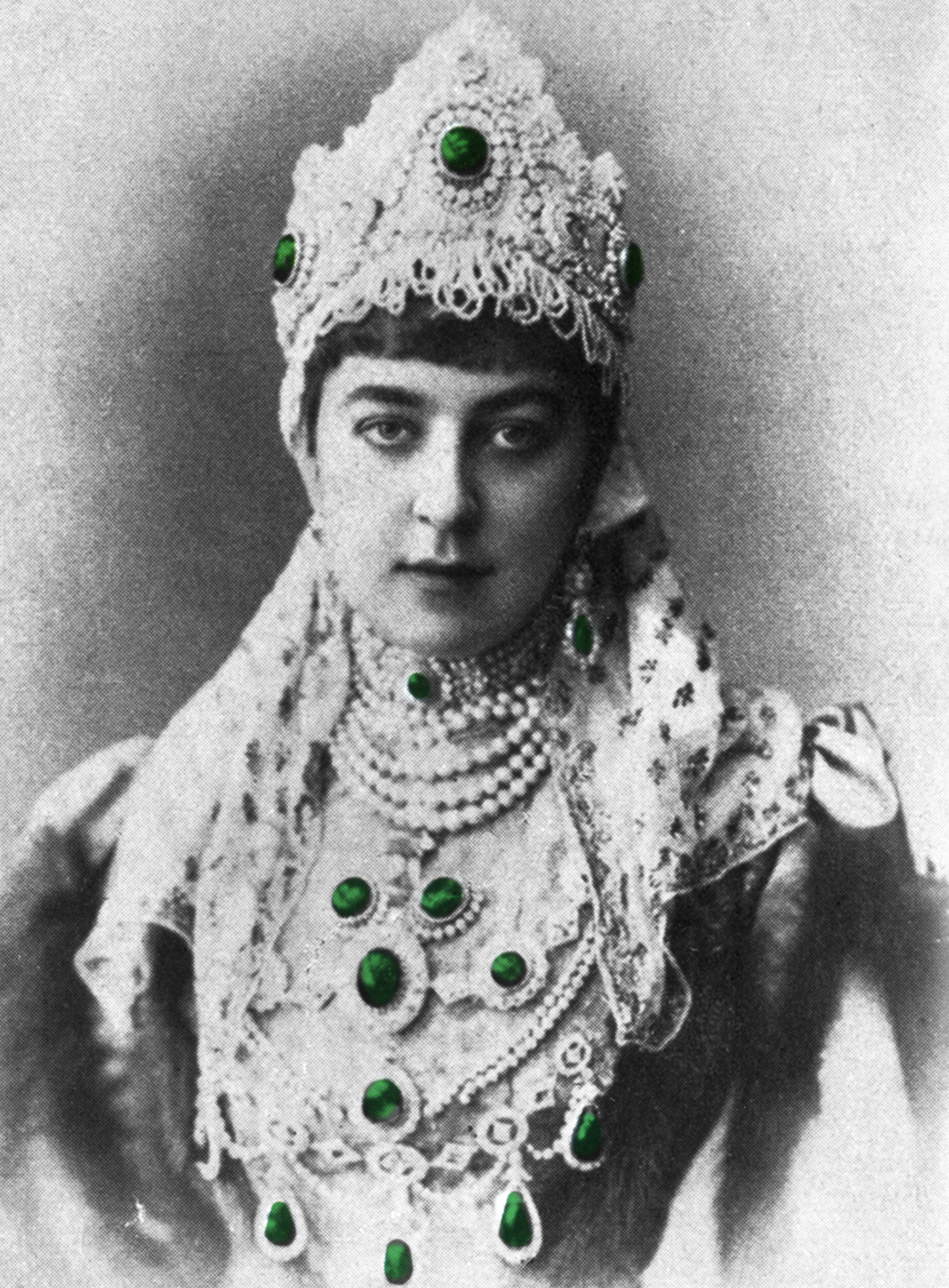
Zinaida Skobeleva, second wife of Duke Eugene

In 1869, he married Daria Konstantinova Opochinina, the granddaughter of Mikhail Kutuzov: she was made Countess of Beauharnais (died 1870 in childbirth).

- Daria, Countess de Beauharnais (19 March 1870, Saint Petersburg - 4 November 1937, Leningrad, Saint Petersburg). She married, firstly, Prince Leon Kotchoubey (1862-1927) in Baden-Baden, Karlsruhe, Baden-Württemberg on 7 September 1893; they divorced in 1911. Married, secondly, Waldemar, Baron von Grävenitz (1872-1916) in Saint Petersburg on 22 February 1911. Married, thirdly, Victor Markezetti (d. 15 January 1938). She had one child with her first husband:
  - Prince Eugéne Kotchoubey de Beauharnais (24 July 1894, Peterhof - 6 November 1951, Paris)

In 1878 he married Zinaida Dmitrievna Skobeleva (also known as Zina) (died 1899), sister to the Russian general Mikhail Skobelev and a first cousin of Eugen's first wife Daria through their common descent from Ivan Nikitich Skobelev. Zina later had an open long-term affair with Grand Duke Alexei Alexandrovich of Russia.

== Career ==
Eugen was a Division General in the Imperial Russian Army. In 1872–1873, he participated in the attack on Khiva and was awarded the Order of St. George, fourth degree. Between 1874 and 1877 he was commander of the Alexandria 5th Hussars. For his work in the Russo-Turkish War in 1877, he received the Order of St. Vladimir third class. He became a Lieutenant general in 1886, and was commander of the 37th Infantry Division from 1888 until 1893.

He died in 1901 in St. Petersburg, and is buried in the Alexander Nevsky Lavra.

== Honours and arms ==
Coat of arms of the Dukes of Leuchtenberg

- Grand Duchy of Hesse: Grand Cross of the Grand Ducal Hessian Order of Ludwig, 14 October 1864
- Kingdom of Bavaria: Knight of the Royal Order of Saint Hubert, 1869
- Württemberg: Grand Cross of the Order of the Württemberg Crown, 1871
- Kingdom of Prussia: Knight of the Order of the Red Eagle, 1st Class, 21 August 1890

== Ancestry ==
Ancestors of Eugen Maximilianovich, 5th Duke of Leuchtenberg

8. Alexandre, vicomte de Beauharnais
4. Eugène de Beauharnais, 1st Duke of Leuchtenberg
9. Joséphine Tascher de La Pagerie
2. Maximilian de Beauharnais, 3rd Duke of Leuchtenberg
10. Maximilian I Joseph of Bavaria
5. Princess Amalia Augusta of Bavaria
11. Princess Augusta Wilhelmine of Hesse-Darmstadt
1. George Maximilianovich, 6th Duke of Leuchtenberg
12. Paul I of Russia
6. Nicholas I of Russia
13. Duchess Sophie Dorothea of Württemberg
3. Grand Duchess Maria Nikolaevna of Russia
14. Frederick William III of Prussia
7. Princess Charlotte of Prussia
15. Louise of Mecklenburg-Strelitz

Eugen Maximilianovich, 5th Duke of Leuchtenberg House of Beauharnais Born: 29 February 1852 Died: 16 May 1912
German nobility
Preceded by Eugen Maximilianovich	Duke of Leuchtenberg; 6 January 1891 – 31 August 1901	Succeeded by George Maximilianovich
