= Queen Alexandra (disambiguation) =

Queen Alexandra (Alexandra of Denmark; 1844–1925) was the consort of Edward VII, King of the United Kingdom.

Queen Alexandra may also refer to:

== People ==
- Salome Alexandra (139 BCE – 67 BCE; r. c. 76 BCE – 67 BCE), Queen of Judaea
- Alexandra of Yugoslavia (1921–1993), queen consort of Peter II, King of Yugoslavia

== Places ==
- Queen Alexandra Hospital (disambiguation), various hospitals

=== United Kingdom ===
- Queen Alexandra Bridge, a bridge across the River Wear in Sunderland, North East, England
- Queen Alexandra College, a college in Harborne, West Midlands, England
- Queen Alexandra Dock, a dock in Cardiff Bay, Wales

=== Elsewhere ===
- Queen Alexandra Range, a major mountain range in Ross Dependency, Antarctica
- Queen Alexandra, Edmonton, a neighborhood in Alberta, Canada
- Queen Alexandra Elementary School, an elementary school in Vancouver, British Columbia, Canada

== Other uses ==
- Queen Alexandra Stakes, a flat horse race in the United Kingdom

== See also ==
- Alexandrine of Mecklenburg-Schwerin (1879–1952), queen consort of Christian X, King of Denmark
- Empress Alexandra (disambiguation)
- King Alexander (disambiguation)
- Princess Alexandra (disambiguation)
- Queen Alexandra's birdwing (Ornithoptera alexandrae), a species of butterfly
- Queen Alexandra's Memorial Ode
- Queen Alexandra's State Coach
