= Princess Alexandra =

Princess Alexandra may refer to:

- Princess Alexandra of Denmark (disambiguation), various princesses, including
  - Alexandra of Denmark (1844–1925), eldest daughter of Christian IX, King of Denmark, and queen consort of Edward VII, King of the United Kingdom
- Alexandra of Glucksburg (disambiguation), various princesses
- Alexandra of Greece and Denmark (disambiguation), various princesses
- Alexandra of Hanover (disambiguation), various princesses
- Alexandra of the United Kingdom (disambiguation), various princesses, including
  - Princess Alexandra of Kent (born 1936), only daughter of Prince George, Duke of Kent, and granddaughter of George V, King of the United Kingdom
- Princess Alexandra of Bavaria (1826–1875), youngest daughter of Ludwig I, King of Bavaria
- Princess Alexandra of Saxe-Altenburg (1830–1911), fifth daughter of Joseph, Duke of Saxe-Altenburg
- Princess Alexandra of Anhalt (1868–1958), youngest child of Frederick I, Duke of Anhalt
- Princess Alexandra of Saxe-Coburg and Gotha (1878–1942), fourth daughter of Alfred, Duke of Saxe-Coburg and Gotha
- Princess Alexandra of Greece (born 1968), great-granddaughter of George I, King of the Hellenes
- Princess Alexandra of Sayn-Wittgenstein-Berleburg (born 1970), eldest daughter of Princess Benedikte of Denmark and granddaughter of Frederik IX, King of Denmark
- Princess Alexandra of Luxembourg (born 1991), only daughter of Henri, Grand Duke of Luxembourg

== See also ==
- Alexandra the Maccabee (63 BCE – 28 BCE), only child of Hyrcanus II, King of Judaea
- Alexandra of Lithuania (d. 1434), seventh daughter of Algirdas, Grand Duke of Lithuania
- Princess Alexandrina Victoria of Kent (1819–1901), later Victoria, Queen of the United Kingdom (r. 1837–1901)
- Duchess Alexandra of Oldenburg (1838–1900), great-granddaughter of Peter I, Grand Duke of Oldenburg
- Alexandra Pavlovna Galitzine (1905–2006), first wife of Prince Rostislav Alexandrovich of Russia from 1928 to 1944
- Alexandra von Fürstenberg (born 1972), husband of Prince Alexander von Fürstenberg from 1995 to 2002
- Ingrid Alexandra, Crown Princess of Norway (born 2004), heir apparent to Haakon VIII, King of Norway
- Alexandra of Russia (disambiguation), various non-princely royals
- Empress Alexandra (disambiguation)
- Prince Alexander (disambiguation)
- Princess Alexandra Hospital (disambiguation)
- Queen Alexandra (disambiguation)
- Alexandra § People with the name
