= Alexander II =

Alexander II may refer to:

- Alexander II of Macedon, king of Macedon from 370 to 368 BC
- Alexander II of Epirus (died 260 BC), king of Epirus in 272 BC
- Alexander II Zabinas, king of the Greek Seleucid kingdom in 128–123 BC
- Alexander (Byzantine emperor) ruled from 912 to 913
- Pope Alexander II of Alexandria, ruled from 702 to 729
- Patriarch Alexander II of Alexandria
- Pope Alexander II (died 1073), pope from 1061 to 1073
- Alexander II of Scotland (1198–1249), king of Scots
- Allauddin Khalji (1297–1316), used title Alexander the Second.
- Alexander II of Imereti (died 1510), king of Georgia and of Imereti
- Alexander II of Kakheti (1527–1605), king of Kakheti
- Alexander II Mircea
- Alexander II of Russia (1818–1881), emperor of Russia
  - Alexander II (statue in Helsinki), Finland
- Alexander II of Yugoslavia (born 1945), crown prince of Serbia

== See also ==
- King Alexander (disambiguation)
