= Empress Alexandra =

Empress Alexandra may refer to:

- Alexandra Feodorovna (disambiguation), various empresses
- Alexandra of Denmark (1844–1925), Empress of India by marriage to Edward VII, Emperor of India

== See also ==
- Emperor Alexander (disambiguation)
- Empress Alexandra Russian Muslim Boarding School for Girls
- Irina Godunova (1557–1603), Tsaritsa of Russia whose monastic name was Alexandra
- Princess Alexandra (disambiguation)
- Queen Alexandra (disambiguation)
