= Alexandria Hospital =

Alexandria Hospital may refer to:

- Inova Alexandria Hospital, Alexandria, Virginia, United States
- Alexandria Hospital, Charlestown, Nevis, Saint Kitts and Nevis

== See also ==
- Alexandra Hospital (disambiguation)
