= Alexandra of Glucksburg =

Alexandra of Glucksburg may refer to:

- Alexandra of Denmark (1844–1925), queen consort of Edward VII, King of the United Kingdom, and member of the House of Glücksburg by birth
- Princess Alexandra Victoria of Schleswig-Holstein-Sonderburg-Glücksburg (1887–1957), second daughter of Friedrich Ferdinand, Duke of Schleswig-Holstein-Sonderburg-Glücksburg
- Princess Alexandra of Greece and Denmark (1870–1891), eldest daughter of George I, King of the Hellenes, and member of the House of Glücksburg by birth
- Alexandra of Yugoslavia (1921–1993), queen consort of Peter II, King of Yugoslavia, and member of the House of Glücksburg by birth
- Princess Alexandra of Greece (born 1968), great-granddaughter of George I, King of the Hellenes, and member of the House of Glücksburg by birth

== See also ==
- Ingrid Alexandra, Crown Princess of Norway (born 2004), heir apparent to Haakon VIII, King of Norway, and member of the House of Glücksburg by birth
- Alexandra of Greece and Denmark (disambiguation)
- Princess Alexandra of Denmark (disambiguation)
- Princess Alexandra (disambiguation)
