= Princess Alexandra of Hanover =

Princess Alexandra of Hanover may refer to:

- Princess Alexandra of Hanover (born 1882), granddaughter of George V, King of Hanover and last grand duchess consort of Mecklenburg-Schwerin
- Alexandra Prinzessin von Hannover (1937–2015), wife of Prince Welf Henry of Hanover
- Princess Alexandra of Hanover (born 1999), youngest child of Princess Caroline of Monaco

== See also ==
- Princess Alexandra (disambiguation)
