= Maximilian de Beauharnais, 3rd Duke of Leuchtenberg =

Duke of Leuchtenberg from 1835 to 1852

Maximilian de Beauharnais
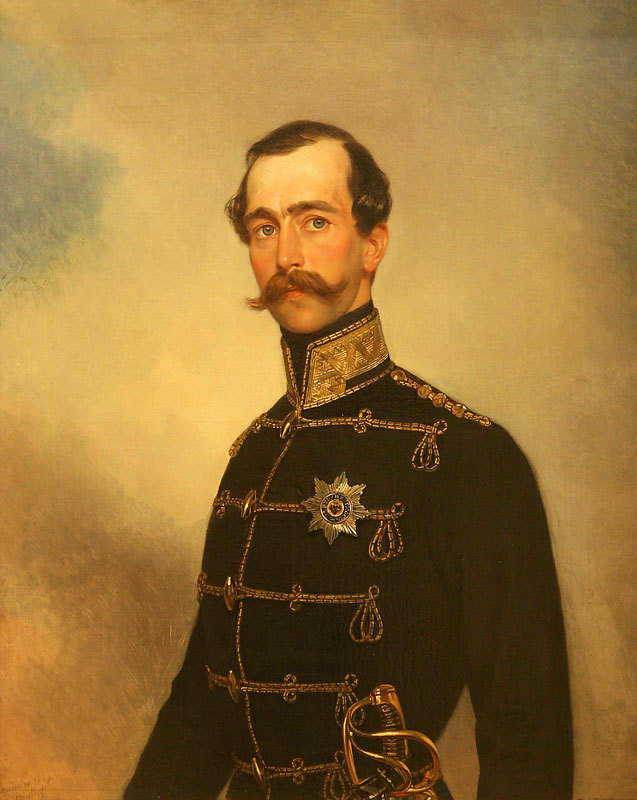
- Portrait by Karl Briullov, 1849

Duke of Leuchtenberg
- Reign: 28 March 1835 – 1 November 1852
- Predecessor: Auguste de Beauharnais
- Successor: Nicholas Maximilianovich
- Born: 2 October 1817; Munich, Kingdom of Bavaria
- Died: 1 November 1852 (aged 35); Saint Petersburg, Russian Empire
- Spouse: Grand Duchess Maria Nikolaevna of Russia (m. 1839)
- Issue: Princess Alexandra; Maria, Princess Louis William of Baden; Nicholas, Duke of Leuchtenberg; Eugenia, Duchess Alexander of Oldenburg; Eugen, Duke of Leuchtenberg; Prince Sergei; Georgi, Duke of Leuchtenberg
Names
- Maximilian Joseph Eugene Auguste Napoleon
- House: Beauharnais
- Father: Eugène de Beauharnais
- Mother: Princess Augusta of Bavaria

Coat of arms upon marriage

Maximilian Joseph Eugene Auguste Napoleon de Beauharnais, 3rd Duke of Leuchtenberg, Prince Romanowsky (2 October 1817 – 1 November 1852) was the husband of Grand Duchess Maria Nikolayevna of Russia and first cousin of Emperors Napoleon III of the French, Francis Joseph I of Austria, and Elisabeth of Austria. He was a grandson of Napoleon I's first wife, the Empress Josephine, by her prior marriage to Alexandre de Beauharnais.

A student of Moritz von Jacobi, he is known as one of pioneers in galvanoplasty and an expert in copper and bronze metalworks generally, as well as an art collector. He was the proprietor of the first locomotive works in Russia.

== Childhood ==
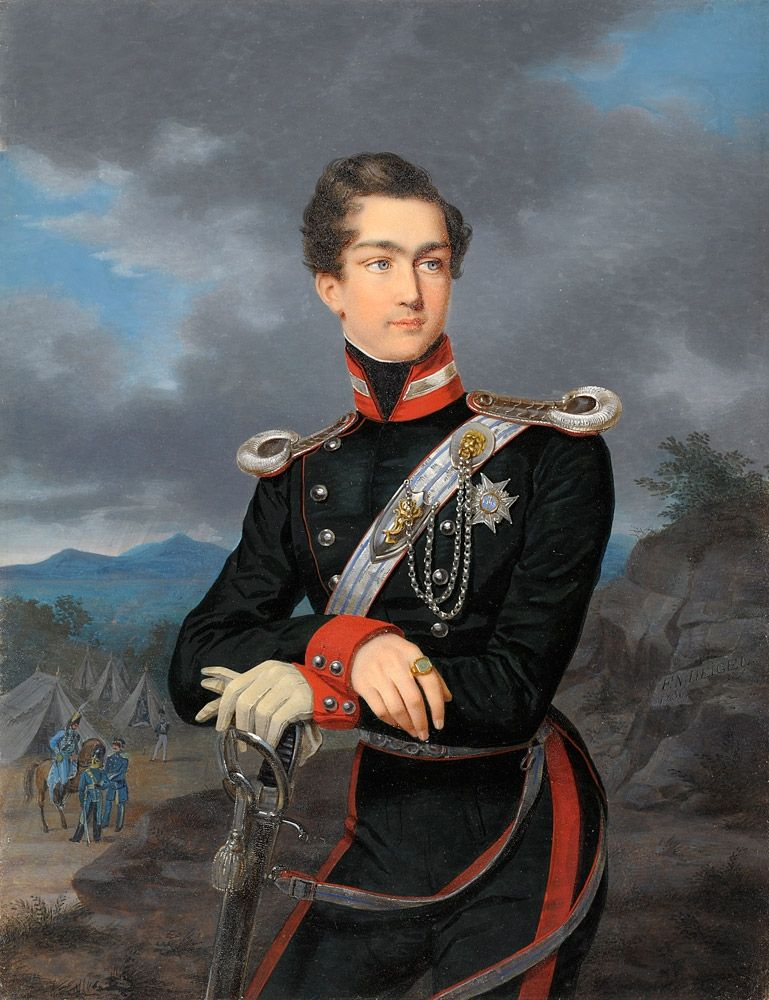
Portrait of Duke Maximilian von Leuchtenberg by Franz Napoleon Heigel in 1836.

He was born as the second son of Eugène de Beauharnais, Duke of Leuchtenberg and Prince of Eichstätt and Princess Augusta Amalia Ludovika Georgia of Bavaria. His maternal grandparents were Maximilian I, King of Bavaria and his first wife Marie Wilhelmine Auguste, Landgravine of Hesse-Darmstadt.

His maternal grandmother Marie Wilhelmine Auguste was a daughter of Georg Wilhelm of Hesse-Darmstadt, younger son of Louis VIII, Landgrave of Hesse-Darmstadt.

He was a brother of:

- Auguste de Beauharnais, Prince consort of Maria II of Portugal;
- Amélie de Beauharnais, Empress consort of Pedro I of Brazil;
- Josephine of Leuchtenberg, Queen consort of Oscar I of Sweden.

Prince Maximilian was born in the kingdom of his maternal grandfather, King Maximilian I of Bavaria. After the fall of the First French Empire and the restoration of the Bourbons in Paris in 1814, Maximilian's father fled France and found refuge with his wife's family in Munich.

Victims of Bavarian protocols, which constantly reminded them that they were inferior to the Wittelsbachs, the Beauharnais family still benefited materially from their exile. With his fortune, Prince Eugène acquired several castles and estates, including the Leuchtenberg Palace in Munich and land situated in the Canton of Thurgau in Switzerland. The French prince also recreated his art collection in Bavaria, and his children grew up among high-quality works of art.

Prince Eugène died of a heart attack in 1824, and his second son was thus raised principally by his mother. Maximilian received a high-quality education supervised by Augusta. His siblings made great marriages: Josephine to the future king of Sweden and Norway (1823), Eugenie to the Prince of Hohenzollern-Hechingen (1826), Amelie to the Emperor of Brazil (1829), Auguste to the Queen of Portugal (1834), and Theodelinde to the Duke of Urach (1841).

Like most men of his social class, Maximilian was destined for a military career. Still an adolescent, he was named commander of the 6th Regiment of the Bavarian Cavalry by his grandfather before being promoted by his uncle King Louis I of Bavaria to colonel of the regiment of Uhlans.

== Duke of Leuchtenberg ==
His maternal grandfather Maximilian of Bavaria appointed his father, Eugène de Beauharnais, 1st Duke of Leuchtenberg on 14 November 1817. The title came with the effective administration of the Principality of Eichstätt. Maximilian was named "Prince of Leuchtenberg" and became the second-in-line heir to the Duchy.

On 21 February 1824, his father died and his older brother became Auguste de Beauharnais, Duke of Leuchtenberg. His brother was yet childless and Maximilian became his Heir Presumptive.

Auguste eventually married Queen Maria II of Portugal but died childless on 28 March 1835. Maximilian became the 3rd Duke of Leuchtenberg at this point.

== Marriage and personal life ==
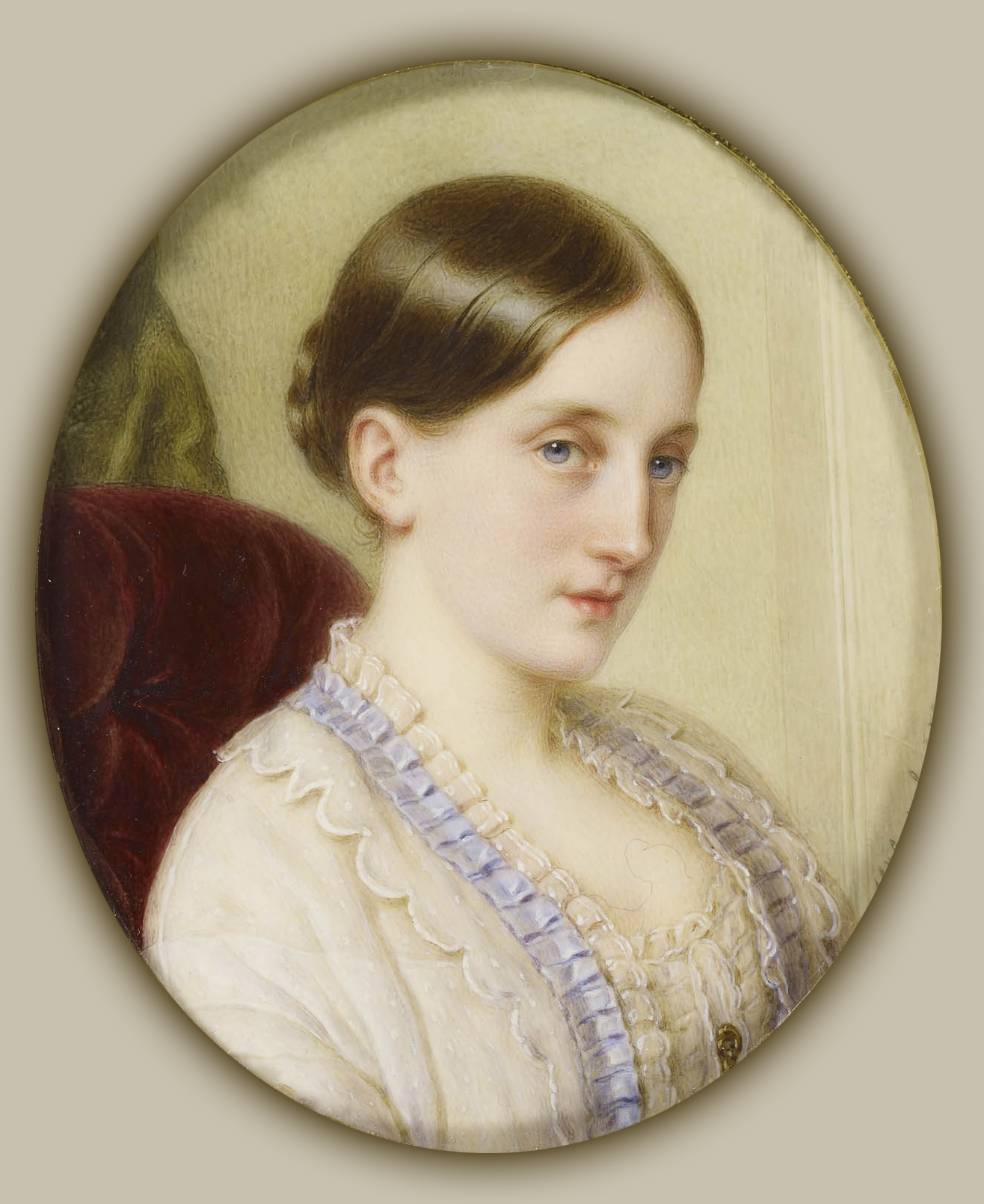
Maria Nikolayevna, Grand Duchess of Russia, when Duchess of Leuchtenberg (1819-1876)

In 1836, Grand Duke Michael Pavlovich of Russia made an official visit to Munich. He met Princess Augusta and her family, who received him with a feast at their home. Shortly after this, Tsar Nicholas I invited King Ludwig I of Bavaria to send a prince of his house to attend military maneuvers in Russia. The tsar had been trying for several years to marry a Russian grand duchess to one of the king's sons, but this had been politely rejected. However, the tsar insisted, and specifically asked that the king send his nephew, Prince Maximilian. After consulting with his sister, who was enthusiastic about the advantages that could come from this trip, Ludwig I asked his nephew to go to Russia to represent Bavaria.

Maximilian's voyage took place in 1837 and took him to different regions of the Russian Empire. He was warmly received by the tsar. Maximilian met the Empress Alexandra Feodorovna and the imperial couple's children.

Quickly, a romance formed between the prince and Grand Duchess Maria Nikolayevna, the tsar's favorite daughter. The tsar was satisfied because he liked Maximilian and considered him an appropriate match for his daughter. Nonetheless, he made his demands known to the young prince: if they married, the prince would have to live in Russia and serve in the imperial army. Above all, he would have to agree to raise his children in the orthodox religion and make them Russian princes. After having consulted his mother, Maximilian accepted the tsar's conditions, and his engagement to Maria was officially announced on 5 December, 1838. Satisfied, the tsar conferred upon his future son-in-law almost all Russian and Polish orders. Shortly thereafter, the Duke of Leuchtenberg returned to Bavaria to put his affairs in order.

They were married on 2 July 1839 in the chapel of the Winter Palace. 15 days of festivities followed, but Muscovites disapproved, shocked to see one of their princesses married to a French prince whose father had participated in taking their city in 1812. His father-in-law Nicholas I granted to him on 14 July 1839 the Russian and Finnish style Imperial Highness, a rank he was entitled to as a descendant of the extended dynasty of Napoleon I of France. His father was an adoptive son of Napoleon. He was named major general of the Russian Army and Colonel in Chief of the Hussars Regiment of Kiev. He also received an annual income of 100,000 rubles. The tsar gave Maria an income of 700,000 rubles as well as a sum of 2 million payable in treasury bonds at 4%. For their lodging, the tsar had built and furnished, at his own cost, one palace in St. Petersburg and another near the capital.

While awaiting the construction of their new residence (called Maria Palace), Maximilian and his wife lived at the Winter Palace. They stayed there until 1845, and their first four children were born there: Alexandra, Maria, Nicholas, and Eugenie. After that, the couple could finally become independent, and Maximilian transferred his collection of paintings, arms, and minerals to Russia. Many of these can be seen today at the Hermitage Museum or other Russian institutions.

The early years of Maximilian and Maria's marriage were happy, and the couple had many children. However, relations between them soured starting in 1845, when the Grand Duchess began an affair with Count Grigori Alexandrovich Stroganov. Most historians believe that Maximilian was not the real father of the princes Eugene, Serge, and George of Leuchtenberg, who were in reality the sons of Stroganov. For his part, Maximilian was not a model husband: he had many female conquests and devoted himself to gambling. In reality, life in Russia weighed on the prince, who was humiliated by being nothing more than his wife's husband there.

== Activities ==
Career military, Maximilian spent long periods away from the capital. Considered a foreigner all his life, he was only sent on secondary missions, which hurt his self-esteem. The prince also struggled to get used to Russian discipline, which was much harsher than that of the Bavarian army.

Passionate about art and science, the prince augmented the collections of paintings, minerals, and arms he had inherited from his father and brother. As Maximilian was considered a brilliant intellectual, the tsar named him an honorary member of the Russian Academy of Sciences and president of the Imperial Academy of Arts.

Maximilian was also the imperial family's first entrepreneur. A personal friend of Moritz von Jacobi, he studied galvanoplasty and electromagnetism with him. Above all, he was the first to use these processes in an industrial way. In 1847, he founded a factory that built the first Russian locomotives.

Besides these activities, Maximilian was patron of several charitable organizations. He financed the building of the Maximilian Clinic, which gave free care to the needy.

== Illness and death ==
In 1845-46, Maximilian went on a mineral expedition in the Urals. There, he contracted pneumonia, which rapidly evolved into tuberculosis. Badly affected by the illness, the prince had to go recuperate in Estonia, then in Majorca, Spain. After 1847, however, doctors considered his condition hopeless and that no further treatment was possible.

The prince died on 1 November, 1852 in St. Petersburg, and his father-in-law declared a mourning period of three months, just like for any member of the imperial house.

== Children ==
1. Princess Alexandra Maximilianovna (9 April 1840 – 12 August 1843), died in childhood
2. Princess Maria Maximilianovna (16 October 1841 – 16 February 1914) m. Prince Wilhelm of Baden (1829–1897), younger son of Leopold, Grand Duke of Baden
3. Nicholas Maximilianovich, 4th Duke of Leuchtenberg (4 August 1843 – 6 January 1891) m. Nadezhda Annenkova (1840-1891)
4. Princess Eugenia Maximilianovna (1 April 1845 – 4 May 1925) m. Duke Alexander Petrovich of Oldenburg (1844–1932)
5. Eugen Maximilianovich, 5th Duke of Leuchtenberg (8 February 1847 – 31 August 1901) m.(1) Daria Opotchinina (1845–1870) m.(2) Zinaida Skobeleva (1856–1899)
6. Prince Sergei Maximilianovich of Leuchtenberg (20 December 1849 – 24 October 1877). Killed in the Russo-Turkish War of 1877-1878.
7. George Maximilianovich, 6th Duke of Leuchtenberg (29 February 1852 – 16 May 1912) m.(1) Duchess Therese Petrovna of Oldenburg (1852–1883) m.(2) Princess Anastasia of Montenegro (1868–1935)

== Further descendants ==
Through his oldest surviving daughter Princess Maria Maximilianovna of Leuchtenberg (1841–1914), he is the grandfather of Prince Maximilian of Baden (1867–1929), Chancellor of Germany during World War I, and Princess Marie of Baden, the last Duchess consort of Anhalt.

His youngest daughter Princess Eugenia Maximilianovna of Leuchtenberg (1845–1925) married Duke Alexander Petrovich of Oldenburg (1844–1932), the grandson of Grand Duchess Catherine Pavlovna of Russia, and became the mother of Duke Peter Alexandrovich of Oldenburg (1868–1924), the divorced husband of Grand Duchess Olga Alexandrovna of Russia (1882–1960), the youngest sister of Nicholas II of Russia.

== Honours ==
- Russian Empire:
  - Knight of St. Andrew, 1838
  - Knight of St. Alexander Nevsky, 1838
  - Knight of the White Eagle, 1838
  - Knight of St. Anna, 1st Class, 1838
- Kingdom of Bavaria: Knight of St. Hubert, 1839
- Empire of Brazil: Grand Cross of the Southern Cross
- Kingdom of Greece: Grand Cross of the Redeemer
- Kingdom of Prussia:
  - Knight of the Black Eagle, 2 June 1841
  - Knight of the Red Eagle, 1st Class
- Kingdom of Portugal: Grand Cross of the Tower and Sword
- Saxe-Weimar-Eisenach: Grand Cross of the White Falcon, 20 May 1841
- Kingdom of Saxony: Knight of the Rue Crown, 1841
- Sweden-Norway:
  - Knight of the Seraphim, 12 August 1835; with Collar, 9 July 1840
  - Commander of the Sword
- Württemberg: Grand Cross of the Württemberg Crown

Maximilian de Beauharnais, 3rd Duke of Leuchtenberg House of Beauharnais Born: 2 October 1817 Died: 1 November 1852
German nobility
Preceded by Auguste de Beauharnais	Duke of Leuchtenberg; 28 March 1835 – 1 November 1852	Succeeded by Nicholas Maximilianovich
French nobility
Preceded by Auguste de Beauharnais	Duke of Navarre; 28 March 1835 – 1 November 1852	Extinct
