= Grand Duchess Maria Nikolaevna of Russia, Duchess of Leuchtenberg =

Duchess of Leuchtenberg (1819–1876)

Grand Duchess Maria Nikolaevna
- Duchess of Leuchtenberg
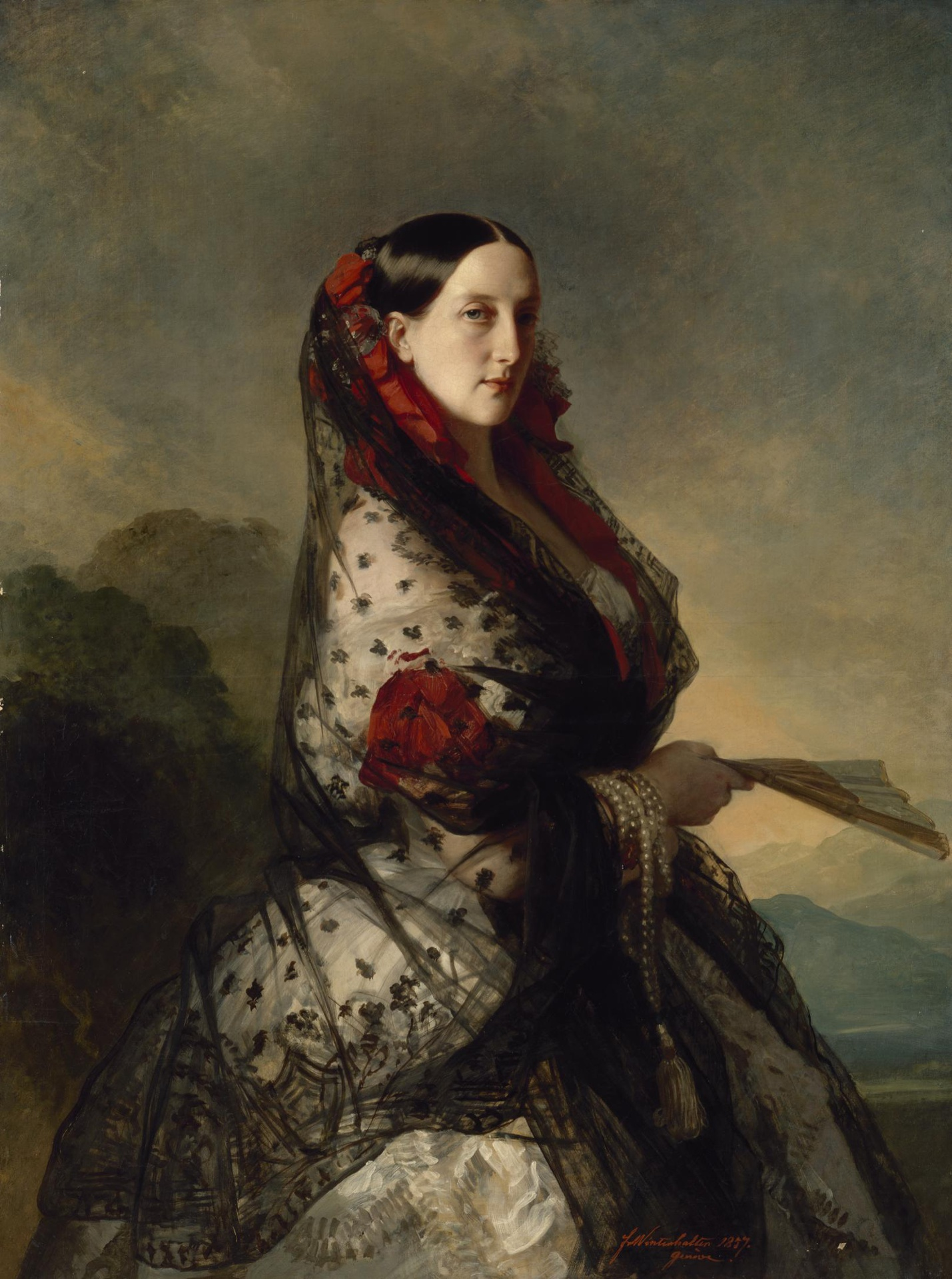
- Maria in 1857
- Born: 18 August 1819; Krasnoye Selo, Saint Petersburg, Russian Empire
- Died: 21 February 1876 (aged 56); Saint Petersburg, Russian Empire
- Burial: Grand Ducal Burial Vault
- Spouse: Maximilian de Beauharnais, 3rd Duke of Leuchtenberg (m. 1839; died 1852) Count Grigori Aleksandrovich Stroganov (m. 1854)
- Issue: Princess Alexandra Maximilianova of Leuchtenberg; Princess Maria Maximilianovna of Leuchtenberg; Prince Nicholas Maximilianovich, 4th Duke of Leuchtenberg; Princess Eugenia Maximilianovna of Leuchtenberg; Prince Eugen Maximilianovich, 5th Duke of Leuchtenberg; Prince Sergei Maximilianovich of Leuchtenberg; Prince George Maximilianovich, 6th Duke of Leuchtenberg; Count Grigori Grigorievich Stroganov; Countess Elena Grigorievna Stroganova
Names
- Maria Nikolaevna Romanova
- House: Holstein-Gottorp-Romanov
- Father: Nicholas I of Russia
- Mother: Princess Charlotte of Prussia

Grand Duchess Maria Nikolaevna Romanova of Russia (Russian: Мария Николаевна Романова) (18 August 1819 – 21 February 1876) was the daughter of Emperor Nicholas I of Russia, and sister of Alexander II. In 1839, she married Maximilian, Duke of Leuchtenberg. She was an art collector and President of the Imperial Academy of Arts in Saint Petersburg.

== Early life ==
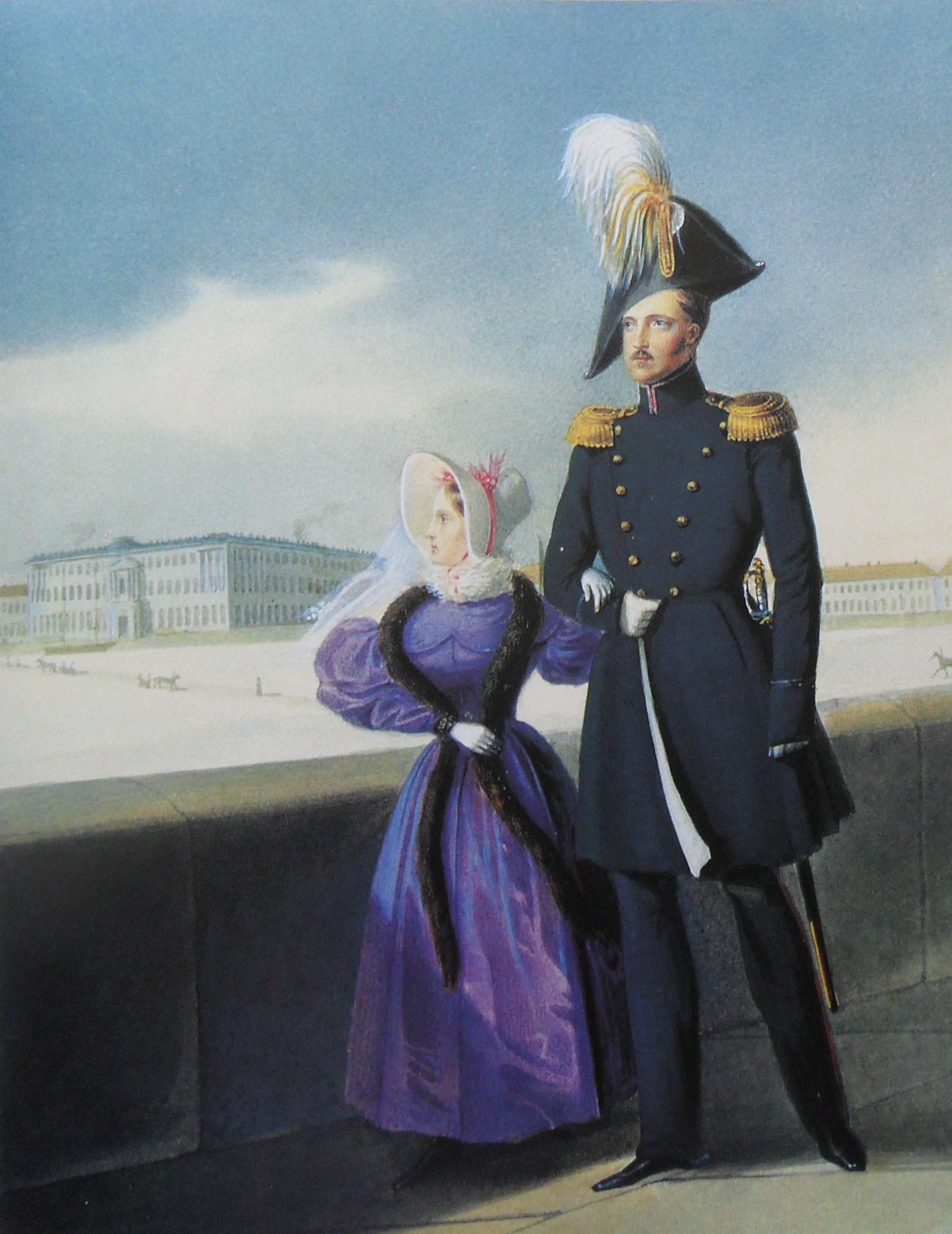
Tsar Nicholas I and his daughter Grand Duchess Maria Nikolaevna

Grand Duchess Maria Nikolaevna of Russia was born on 18 August [O.S. 6 August] 1819 in Krasnoye Selo in Saint Petersburg. She was the second of seven surviving children and the eldest daughter. Her parents, Tsar Nicholas I of Russia and Empress Alexandra Feodorovna, born Princess Charlotte of Prussia, were devoted to each other and to their children. They were warm and affectionate parents, but avoided overindulging them. In the evenings, Alexandra Feodorovna played games with her children, including riddles and charades. The Tsar liked to sing chorus music with them. Maria was known fondly as "Masha" within the family and with close friends. Maria and her siblings grew up in a close knit family, remaining on good terms all their lives.

Maria was raised in the company of her sisters Olga and Alexandra. Their rooms, located on the ground floor of the Winter Palace, were unpretentious and void of luxury. The girls were prescribed fresh air in all seasons, and doctors controlled their diet. Classes began at 8:00 AM. Maria's education was placed under the supervision of the liberal privy Counselor and poet Vasily Zhukovsky, who had previously been her mother, Alexandra Feodorovna's, Russian teacher. Zhukovsky remained in close terms with his royal wards until his death. Maria and her sisters received dancing, music and drawing lessons. Her childhood sketchbook (1826–1830) has survived and it is in the hands of her descendants living in the United States. Grand Duchess Maria, who painted fairly well, later made watercolors. She never lost her love for the arts, becoming a benefactress and art collector. Artistically gifted, she showed an early interest in interior design, decorating her rooms with her personal style. She would later make her Palace in St Petersburg one of the most beautiful in the city. All three sisters had musical abilities and were involved in charitable work. From 1835, Grand Duchess Maria was an active member of the patriots' society, which had been founded by Empress Elizabeth Alexeievna. The society occasionally met in session in Maria's room at the Winter Palace.

== Grand Duchess of Russia ==
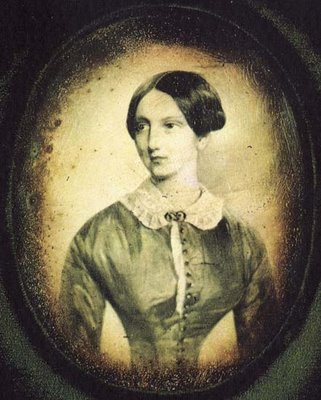
Grand Duchess Maria Nikolaevna in her youth. Daguerreotype, 1840s.

Grand Duchess Maria Nikolaevna was noted for her formidable personality, her wit and her strong character. Her sister Grand Duchess Olga, wrote in her girlhood diary that Maria was "hot tempered, attentive and generous towards the poor, sympathetic to good deeds, but could not bear pretense of coercion. She is a hundred times more virtuous than me, more dynamic than all seven of us; she lacks only a sense of duty".

Maria was brave and inventive, appreciated novelty, and was almost indifferent to the opinion of high society. She was lively, energetic, talented and impulsive. In appearance and character she was like her father. She was Nicholas I's favorite child and the one who resembled him most closely both in appearance and character. Like him she looked serious and severe. Her stare also brought to mind her father's formidable gaze. The physical similarities with her father were marked in portraits and photographs that preferred to portray her in profile, the same as her father.

Empress Alexandra Feodorovna worried about finding a suitable husband for her most gifted and emotional daughter. On her part, Maria did not want to leave Russia upon her marriage or have to change her religion.

== Marriage ==
In 1837 King Ludwig I of Bavaria sent his nephew Maximilian, Duke of Leuchtenberg, to take part in cavalry maneuvers in Russia. Maximilian was the only surviving son of Eugène de Beauharnais and grandson of Empress Josephine. He was handsome, well educated and interested in cultural pursuits. A year later, in October 1838, he made a second visit. With his good looks and manners he impressed Maria, as noted by her sister, Grand Duchess Olga in her diary: "In four days it has become quite clear that Max and Maria were made for each other."

It was not a desirable match for a daughter of a Russian Emperor. Maximilian was below the rank of royalty, only entitled to the style of Serene Highness as member of a secondary branch of the House of Bavaria. He was also Roman Catholic, not Orthodox, and his own family, his mother Princess Augusta of Bavaria in particular, was against this marriage. Maximilian was the last of the Leuchtenberg – Beauharnais family line and his mother feared that his descendants, brought up in the Orthodox faith, would be completely Russified. She said history would blame her son.

Furthermore, the Bonaparte family had been bitter enemies of Russia. Nevertheless, the Tsar granted his permission for the marriage on condition that his daughter did not leave Russia to live abroad. Since the Duke of Leuchtenberg was not a member of a reigning family, it was easy for him to take up residence in Saint Petersburg.

The wedding took place on 2 July 1839 at the grand church of the Winter Palace. The ceremony was described in detail by the Marquis de Custine, who visited St Peterburg at that time. He praised the Grand Duchess for her grace, but disliked the Duke of Leuchtenberg. Nicholas I spared no expense for his daughter's wedding and the festivities lasted for two weeks. The couple remained in Russia, where their seven children grew up in the circle of the imperial family.

== Grand Duchess Maria's palace ==
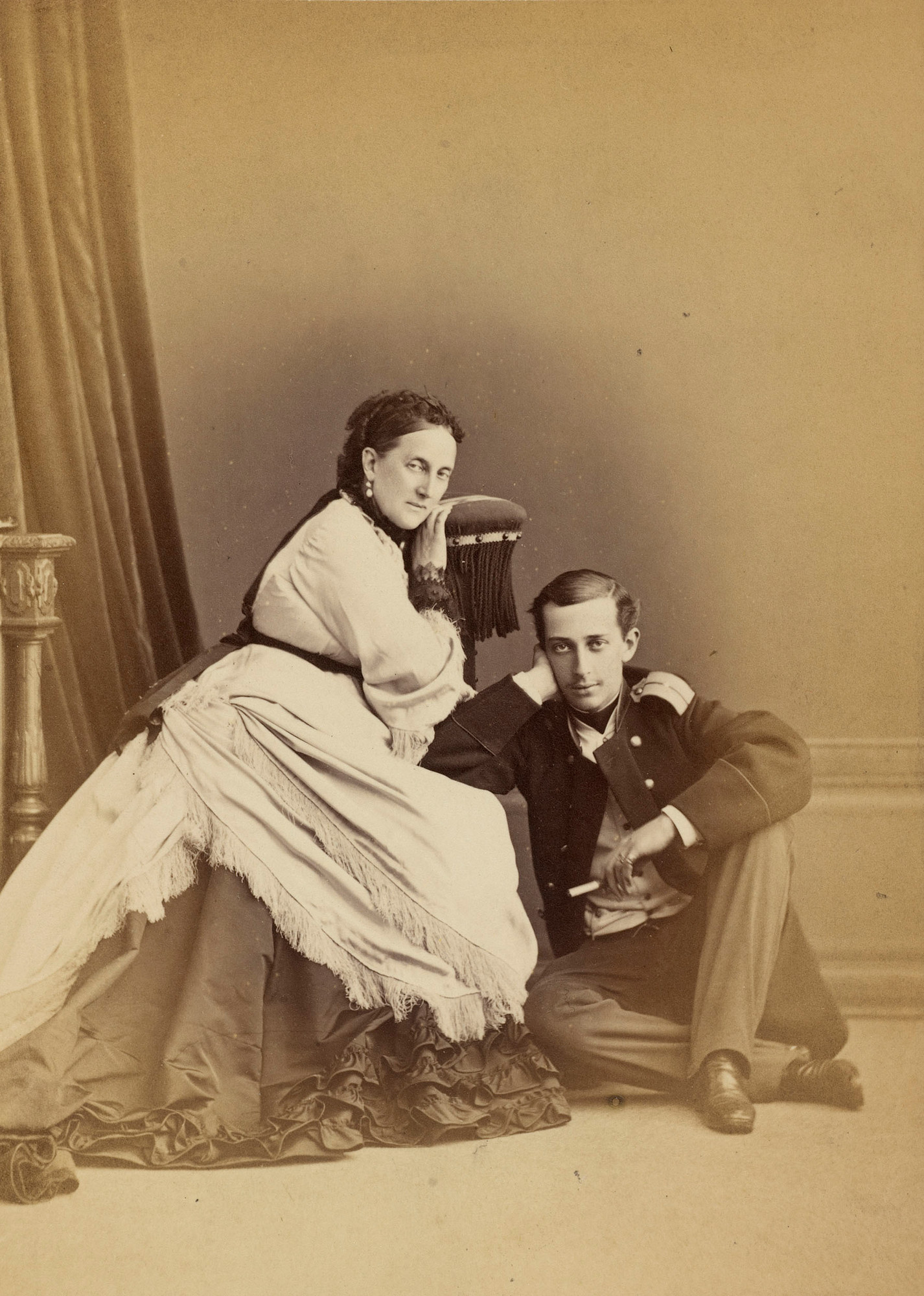
Maria Nikolaevna, Duchess of Leuchtenberg with her son Sergei, 1872.

On their wedding day, Tsar Nicholas I decided to present Maria with her own palace. He chose a site in the centre of St. Petersburg strategically positioned opposite St. Isaac's cathedral, on the banks of the Moika river. No expense was spared in fitting it out for the young couple, specially commissioned from the architect Andrei Stackensneider and, close enough to the Winter Palace for the Tsar to pay daily visits to his daughter. The palace was finished by the end of 1844 and was named as the Mariinsky Palace, after Maria. Whilst their palace was under construction Maria gave birth to three children, Princess Alexandra (1840-1843), Princess Maria, and Prince Nicholas. The couple lived in the Vorontsov Palace waiting for the completion of their own residence.

Maria played a leading role in the decoration of her home, displaying her taste and sense of elegance. Because she [Maria] was afflicted with circulatory leg problems, the Mariinsky Palace was designed with a staircase without steps installed in the right wing connecting all three floors away from the main rooms. The palace was filled with works of arts and family relics, some of them inherited from Empress Josephine. Maria organized lavish parties, theatrical performances and concerts. Maria also owned a country estate, Sergievka, bought from the Naryshkin family and given to her as a wedding gift. Located west of Peterhof in a little bay opposite Kronstadt, the villa Sergievka became a favorite family retreat. Maria and her husband spent their honeymoon there and between 1839 and 1842 they commissioned Stackensneider to rebuild it. It was transformed from an old manor house into a summer palace in the style of a Roman patrician villa. In the summer they usually lived in Gatchina and Tsarskoye Selo.

== President of the Academy of Arts ==
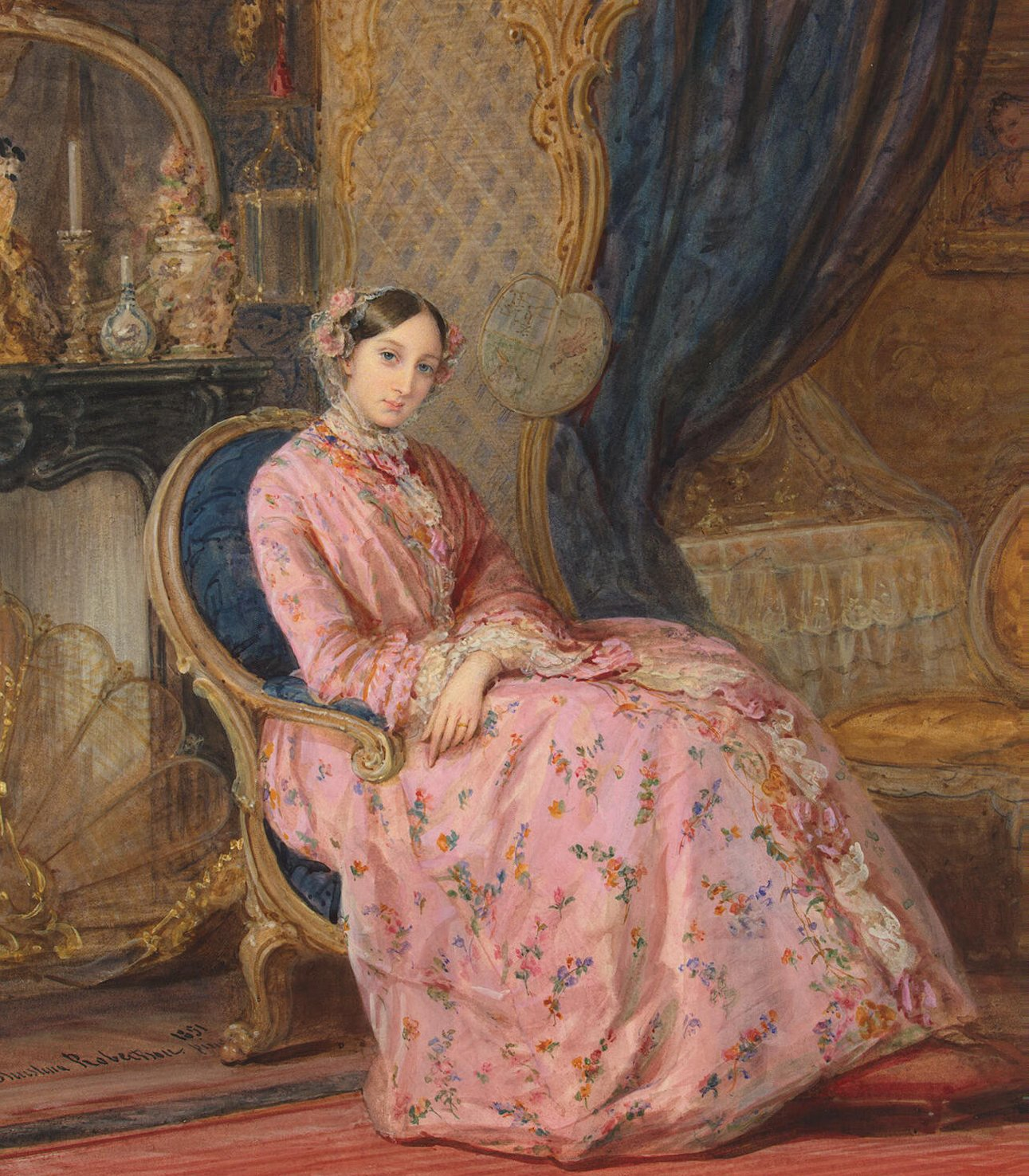
Portrait of Grand Duchess Maria Nikolaevna

Grand Duchess Maria Nikolaevna and her husband had artistic inclinations and were active in charitable and artistic causes. Maria's husband became well known as a scientist throughout Russia. He took an interest in science and studied mining technology; he was a member of the academy of Science. In 1844, Nicholas I appointed him head of the Mining Engineering department. In 1843 he was appointed President of the Academy of Arts. Maria was proud of her husband's accomplishments, calling him a scholar. However, by the late 1840s the couple drifted apart. They had separate lives and both had love affairs of their own. Maximilian became a well known womanizer, while Maria started a long-term relationship with Count Gregory Alexandrovich Strogonov. Court rumors attributed the paternity of her son George to her lover. In 1852, the Duke of Leuchtenberg developed tuberculosis during mining expeditions in the Urals. Efforts to improve his health traveling to warmer climates abroad were unsuccessful, and he died on 1 November, 1852 at the age of 35. Maria was 33 when she was widowed.

Grand Duchess Maria was an avid art collector, and after the death of her husband, she replaced him as President of the Academy of Arts. From then on, Maria devoted herself to her collection with even greater ardor. She spent lavishly, and as a consequence, her finances declined, particularly after the death of her father. Alexander II, although close to his sister, kept her on a strict budget.

== Second marriage ==
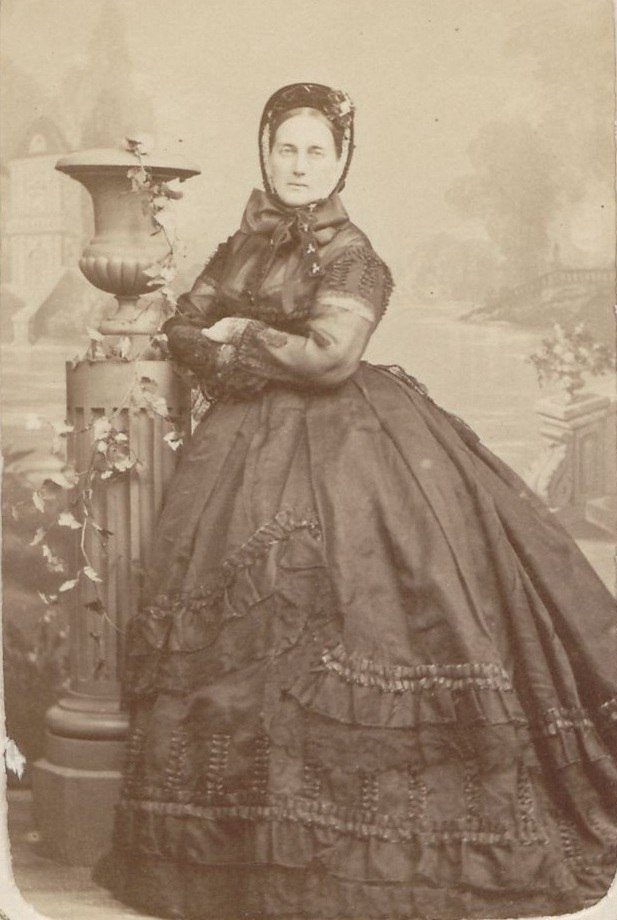
Grand Duchess Maria Nikolaevna of Russia in the 1870s.

Maria Nikolaevna had a second marriage in 1854, to Count Grigori Alexandrovich Stroganov (16 June 1824 – 13 March 1879). It was a morganatic union and was kept secret while her father lived. Officially the marriage did not take place until 16 November 1856, after Nicholas I's death. Anna Tyutcheva commented, "The former tsar would have sent Masha to a convent and exiled the count to the Caucasus", but her more gentle brother Tsar Alexander, as the new head of the family, preferred not to let on that he knew about the secret marriage. Maria begged her brother to recognize her second marriage and permit them to live in Russia, but he did not dare permit it; instead, he suggested she continue to live abroad while he maintained ignorance of their marriage. Because he could not recognize her marriage, he paid special attention to her children by her first marriage, who lived in St. Petersburg without their mother.

In 1862, Maria Nikolaevna installed herself in Florence in the Villa Quarto, which had belonged to Jérôme Bonaparte, and appointed the painter and collector Karl Liphard as her advisor. They went almost daily to visit museums, private collection and antique dealers. In Italy, the Grand Duchess was zealous in her purchases of painting, sculptures and furniture for the complete refurbishing of her residence.

Grand Duchess Maria probably suffered either from varicose veins or from some sort of bone disease, and by the end of her life she had become an invalid. She died on 21 February 1876 in Saint Petersburg, Empire of Russia at the age of 56.

== Art collections ==
On her death in 1876, Maria Nikolaevna's art collections were divided among her surviving children: Prince Nicholas of Leuchtenberg, his brothers Eugene and George, their sisters Princess Maria of Baden and Princess Eugenia of Oldenburg and their half-sister, countess Elena Stroganova. In 1884, her son, Nicholas Duke of Leuchtenberg, mounted an exhibition at the St. Petersburg Academy of Fine Arts with the Grand Duchess former collection. In 1913 another exhibitions was organized at the Hermitage Museum entitled the Heritage of Grand Duchess Maria Nikolaevna. After the revolution the collection was dispersed and now can be enjoyed in museums in Moscow, Saint Petersburg, Vienna and the United States. Three of Maria's sons by the Duke of Leuchtenberg lived in her former residence the Mariinsky Palace until 1884, when it was sold to the treasury to pay for the family's mounting debts. Today the Palace houses the Saint Petersburg Legislative Assembly.

== Children ==
Grand Duchess Maria Nikolaevna had seven children from her marriage to the Duke of Leuchtenberg:

Name	Birth	Death	Notes
Princess Alexandra Maximilianovna	9 April 1840	12 August 1843	Died in childhood, at age 3.
Princess Maria Maximilianovna	16 October 1841	16 February 1914	Married Prince Wilhelm of Baden (1829–1897). Had issue.
Prince Nicholas Maximilianovich	4 August 1843	6 January 1891	4th Duke of Leuchtenberg, married Nadeshda Sergeevna Annenkova (1840–1891). Had issue.
Princess Eugenia Maximilianovna	1 April 1845	4 May 1925	Married Duke Alexander Petrovich of Oldenburg 1844–1932
Prince Eugen Maximilianovich	8 February 1847	31 August 1901	5th Duke of Leuchtenberg, first marriage to Daria Opotchinina who died in childbirth. Second marriage to Zinaida Dmitrievna Skobeleva.
Prince Sergei Maximilianovich	20 December 1849	24 October 1877	Never married. Killed in the Russo-Turkish war, at age 27.
Prince George Maximilianovich,	29 February 1852	16 May 1912	6th Duke of Leuchtenberg, First marriage to Duchess Therese Petrovna of Oldenburg, second marriage to Princess Anastasia of Montenegro.

Grand Duchess Maria Nikolaevna had two children in her second marriage:

Name	Birth	Death	Notes
Count Grigori Grigorievich	9 May 1857	26 February 1859	Died in childhood, at age 1.
Countess Elena Grigorievna	11 February 1861	12 February 1908	First marriage to Vladimir Alexeievich Sheremetev, second marriage to Grigori Nikitich Milashevich.

== Ancestry ==
Ancestors of Grand Duchess Maria Nikolaevna of Russia, Duchess of Leuchtenberg

8. Peter III of Russia
4. Paul I of Russia
9. Catherine II of Russia
2. Nicholas I of Russia
10. Frederick II Eugene, Duke of Württemberg
5. Duchess Sophie Dorothea of Württemburg
11. Margravine Friederike of Brandenburg-Schwedt
1. Grand Duchess Maria Nikolaevna of Russia
12. Frederick William II of Prussia
6. Frederick William III of Prussia
13. Landgravine Frederika Louisa of Hesse-Darmstadt
3. Princess Charlotte of Prussia
14. Charles II, Grand Duke of Mecklenburg-Strelitz
7. Duchess Louise of Mecklenburg-Strelitz
15. Princess Friederike of Hesse-Darmstadt
