= Princess Alexandra of Denmark (disambiguation) =

Princess Alexandra of Denmark (1844–1925) was the queen consort of Edward VII, King of the United Kingdom and the eldest daughter of Christian IX, King of Denmark.

Princess Alexandra of Denmark may also refer to:

- Princess Alexandra of Greece and Denmark (1870–1891), Danish princess by birth
- Alexandra of Yugoslavia (1921–1993), queen consort of Yugoslavia and Danish princess by birth
- Alexandra, Countess of Frederiksborg (born 1964), formerly Princess Alexandra of Denmark by marriage to Prince Joachim of Denmark

== See also ==
- Princess Alexandra of Sayn-Wittgenstein-Berleburg (born 1970), eldest daughter of Princess Benedikte of Denmark
- Alexandra of Glucksburg (disambiguation)
- Alexandra of Greece and Denmark (disambiguation)
- Princess Alexandra (disambiguation)
