= Alexandra Hospital (disambiguation) =

Alexandra Hospital is a hospital in Queenstown, Singapore.

Alexandra Hospital may also refer to:

- Alexandra Hospital (Athens), Greece
- Alexandra Hospital (Cape Town), Western Cape, South Africa
- Alexandra Hospital (Cheadle), Greater Manchester, England, United Kingdom
- Alexandra Hospital, Redditch, Worcestershire, England, United Kingdom

== See also ==
- Alexandria Hospital (disambiguation)
- Princess Alexandra Hospital (disambiguation)
- Queen Alexandra Hospital (disambiguation)
