= Alexander King =

Alexander King may refer to:

- Alexander Campbell King (1856–1926), U.S. Solicitor General and federal judge
- Alexander King (footballer) (1871–1957), Scottish footballer
- Alexander King (author) (1899–1965), U.S. humorist, memoirist, and TV personality
- Alexander King (scientist) (1909–2007), British sustainable development pioneer
- Alexander King (MP) (fl. 1588–1601), British MP for Bishop's Castle
- Alexander King (German politician)
- Alex King (rugby union) (born 1975), English footballer
- Alex King (basketball) (born 1985), German basketball player
- Alex King (referee), Australian soccer referee

== See also ==
- King Alexander (disambiguation)
