= Alexander I =

Alexander I may refer to:

- Alexander I of Macedon, king of Macedon from 495 to 454 BC
- Alexander I of Epirus (370–331 BC), king of Epirus
- Alexander I Theopator Euergetes, surnamed Balas, ruler of the Seleucid Empire 150-145 BC
- Pope Alexander I (died 115), early bishop of Rome
- Pope Alexander I of Alexandria (died 320s), patriarch of Alexandria
- Alexander I of Scotland (c. 1078 – 1124), king of Scotland
- Aleksandr Mikhailovich of Tver (1301–1339), prince of Tver as Alexander I
- Alexander I of Georgia (1386–?), king of Georgia
- Alexander I of Moldavia (died 1432), prince of Moldavia
- Alexander I of Kakheti (1445–1511), king of Kakheti
- Alexander Jagiellon (1461–1506), king of Poland
- Alexander I of Russia (1777–1825), emperor of Russia
- Alexander of Battenberg (1857–1893), prince of Bulgaria
- Alexander I of Serbia (1876–1903), king of Serbia
- Alexander I of Yugoslavia (1888–1934), king of Yugoslavia
- Alexander of Greece (1893–1920), king of Greece

== See also ==
- King Alexander (disambiguation)
