= Alexander III =

Alexander III may refer to:

- Alexander III of Macedon (356 BC – 323 BC), also known as Alexander the Great
- Alexander (Byzantine emperor) (870–913), Byzantine emperor
- Pope Alexander III (1100s–1181)
- Alexander III of Vladimir, grand duke of Vladimir (1328–1331), prince of Suzdal
- Alexander III of Scotland (1241–1286), king of Scotland
- Alexander III of Imereti (1609–1660), king of Imereti
- Alexander III of Kakheti (died 1739), king of Kakheti
- Alexander III of Russia (1845–1894), emperor of Russia
  - Pont Alexandre III, an arch bridge that spans the Seine in Paris
  - Russian battleship Imperator Aleksandr III, Russian warship
- Alexander III of Antioch (1869–1958), Greek Orthodox patriarch of Antioch

== See also ==
- King Alexander (disambiguation)
