= Alexander Romanov =

Alexander Romanov may refer to:

- Alexander I of Russia (1777–1825), also known as Alexander the Blessed
- Alexander II of Russia (1818–1881), a.k.a. Alexander the Liberator
- Alexander III of Russia (1845–1894)
- Alexander Romanov (ice hockey, born 1980) (born 1980), Russian ice hockey player in the Kontinental Hockey League
- Alexander Romanov (ice hockey, born 2000)
- Alexandr Romanov (fighter), Moldavian mixed martial artist
- Grand Duke Alexander Alexandrovich of Russia (1869–1870), infant son of Alexander III
- Grand Duke Alexander Mikhailovich of Russia (1866–1933), dynast of the Russian Empire, naval officer, author, explorer & brother-in-law of Emperor Nicholas II
- Prince Alexander Romanov (1929–2002), Russian prince and descendant of the Imperial Family
