= Princess Alexandra Hospital =

Princess Alexandra Hospital may refer to:

- Princess Alexandra Hospital, Anguilla
- Princess Alexandra Hospital, Brisbane, Queensland, Australia
- Princess Alexandra Hospital, Harlow, Essex, England, United Kingdom
- Princess Alexandra Hospital, RAF Wroughton, Wiltshire, England

== See also ==
- Alexandra Hospital (disambiguation)
- PA Hospital busway station, near Princess Alexandra Hospital, Brisbane
- Princess Alexandra Hospital NHS Trust
- Queen Alexandra Hospital (disambiguation)
