= Alexander of Russia =

Alexander of Russia may refer to:

- Alexander I of Russia (1777–1825), also known as Alexander the Blessed
- Alexander II of Russia (1818–1881), also known as Alexander the Liberator
- Alexander III of Russia (1845–1894), also known as Alexander the Peacekeeper
