= Queen Alexandra Hospital (disambiguation) =

Queen Alexandra Hospital is a hospital in Portsmouth, England, United Kingdom.

Queen Alexandra Hospital may also refer to:

- Queen Alexandra Hospital, Hobart, Tasmania, Australia
- Queen Alexandra Military Hospital, London, England, United Kingdom

== See also ==
- Alexandra Hospital (disambiguation)
- Princess Alexandra Hospital (disambiguation)
- Royal Alexandra Hospital for Children, Westmead, Sydney, Australia
