= Prince Alexander =

Prince Alexander may refer to:

- Alexander, a character from the King's Quest series of video games
- Alexander Cambridge, 1st Earl of Athlone, born as Prince Alexander of Teck
- Alexander Karađorđević, Prince of Serbia (r. 1842–1858)
- Alexander Mountbatten, 1st Marquess of Carisbrooke, born as Prince Alexander Albert of Battenberg (1886–1960)
- Alexander of Bulgaria, born as Alexander Joseph of Battenberg (1857–1893)
- Alexander I of Serbia (1876–1903), King of Serbia
- Alexander I of Yugoslavia (1888–1934), King of Yugoslavia
- Prince Alexander of Hesse and by Rhine (1823–1888)
- Prince Alexandre of Belgium, Alexander Emmanuel Henry Albert Marie Léopold (1942–2009)
- Prince Alexander of Denmark (1903–1991), later became King Olav V of Norway
- Prince Alexander von Fürstenberg (born 1970)
- Prince Alexander of Georgia (1770–1844)
- Prince Alexander of Hohenlohe-Waldenburg-Schillingsfürst (1794–1849)
- Prince Alexander of Imereti (1674–1711)
- Prince Alexander of Imereti (1760–1780)
- Prince Alexander of Kartli (1726–1791)
- Prince Alexander of Kartli (died 1711)
- Prince Alexander of Kartli (died 1773)
- Prince Alexander of Liechtenstein (1929–2012)
- Willem-Alexander, King of the Netherlands
- Prince Alexander of the Netherlands (1818–1848)
- Prince Alexander of Prussia (1820–1896)
- Prince Alexander Ferdinand of Prussia (1912–1985)
- Prince Alexander Romanov (1929–2002)
- Alexander, Prince of Saxony (born 1954)
- Prince Alexander of Sweden, Duke of Södermanland (born 2016), son of Prince Carl Philip of Sweden, Duke of Värmland and grandson of King Carl XVI Gustaf of Sweden
- Prince Alexander John of Wales (1871), short-lived son of Edward VII
- Prince Alexander David Ssimbwa of Buganda (1934–2014)
- Alexander, Crown Prince of Yugoslavia (born 1945), head of the House of Karageorgevic
- Prince Alexander of Yugoslavia (born 1982)
- Prince Alexander of Yugoslavia (1924–2016)

A few other princes have borne the name Alexander:

- George V of Hanover (1819–1878)
- Prince Alfred of Edinburgh and Saxe-Coburg and Gotha (1874–1899)
- Prince George, Duke of Kent (1902–1942)
- Prince Richard, Duke of Gloucester (born 1944)
- Prince George of Wales (born 2013)
