= King Alexander =

King Alexander may refer to:

== Royalty ==
=== Epirus ===
- Alexander I of Epirus
- Alexander II of Epirus

=== Georgia ===
- Alexander I of Georgia (1386–?)

=== Greece ===
- Alexander of Greece (1893–1920)

=== Imereti ===
- Alexander II of Imereti (died 1510)
- Alexander III of Imereti (1609–1660)

=== Judea ===
- Alexander Jannaeus (reigned 103–76 BCE)

=== Kakheti ===
- Alexander II of Kakheti (1527–1605)

=== Macedon ===
- Alexander I of Macedon (died 454 BC)
- Alexander II of Macedon (died 368 BC)
- Alexander III of Macedon (356–323 BC)
- Alexander IV of Macedon (323–310 BC)
- Alexander V of Macedon (died 294 BC)

=== Poland ===
- Alexander Jagiellon

=== Scotland ===
- Alexander I of Scotland (c. 1078–1124)
- Alexander II of Scotland (1198–1249)
- Alexander III of Scotland (1241–1286)

=== Serbia ===
- Alexander I of Serbia (1876–1903), king of Serbia, son of Milan I

=== Yugoslavia ===
- Alexander I of Yugoslavia (1888–1934)

== Other ==
- F. King Alexander, college president
- King Alexander palm, Archontophoenix alexandrae

== See also ==
- Alexander King (disambiguation)
- Alexander of Macedon (disambiguation)
- Alexander of Scotland (disambiguation)
- Alexander I (disambiguation)
- Alexander II (disambiguation)
- Alexander III (disambiguation)
