= Emperor Alexius =

Emperor Alexius or Alexis may refer to:

- Alexios I Komnenos (1048–1118), Byzantine emperor
- Alexios II Komnenos (1169–1183), Byzantine emperor
- Alexios III Angelos (1153–1211), Byzantine emperor
- Alexios IV Angelos (1182–1204), Byzantine emperor
- Alexios V (died 1205), Alexios Doukas Mourtzouphlos, Byzantine emperor
- Alexios I of Trebizond (1182–1222)
- Alexios II of Trebizond (1282–1330)
- Alexios III of Trebizond (1338–1390)
- Alexios IV of Trebizond (1382–1429)
- Alexis I of Russia (1629–1676), Alexei Mikhailovich Romanov
