= Alexander of Greece (disambiguation) =

Alexander of Greece (1893–1920) was king of Greece from 1917 until his death.

Alexander of Greece may also refer to:

- Alexander of Greece (rhetorician) (fl. 2nd century)
- Alexander the Great (356–323 BC), ancient Greek king and general

== See also ==
- Alexander § People with the given name Alexander
