= Alexander of Scotland =

Alexander of Scotland may refer to:

- King Alexander I of Scotland or Alaxandair mac Maíl Coluim (c. 1078–1124), King of Scots, called "The Fierce"
- King Alexander II of Scotland (1198–1249), King of Scots, only son of William the Lion and Ermengarde of Beaumont
- King Alexander III of Scotland (1241–1286), King of Scots, only son of Alexander II by his second wife Marie de Coucy
- Alexander, Prince of Scotland (1264–1284), son of King Alexander III
