= Prime Minister of Romania =

Head of government

Prime Minister of the Government of Romania
- Prim-ministrul Guvernului României
- Standard of the Prime Minister of Romania

- Incumbent; Luca Niculescu since 20 October 2026
- Style: His Excellency
- Type: Head of government
- Member of: Government of Romania; Supreme Council of National Defence
- Seat: Victoria Palace, Bucharest
- Appointer: President of Romania
- Term length: 4 years; No term limit
- Inaugural holder: Barbu Catargiu
- Formation: 22 January 1862; 164 years ago
- Salary: 288,000 lei annually (2022)
- Website: gov.ro/ro/guvernul/cabinetul-de-ministri/prim-ministru1575537361

The prime minister of Romania (Romanian: Prim-ministrul României), officially the prime minister of the Government of Romania (Romanian: Prim-ministrul Guvernului României), is the head of the Government of Romania. Initially, the office was styled President of the Council of Ministers (Romanian: Președintele Consiliului de Miniștri), when the term "Government" included more than the Cabinet, and the Cabinet was called the Council of Ministers (Romanian: Consiliul de Miniștri). The title was officially changed to Prime Minister by the 1965 Constitution of Romania during the communist regime.

== Nomination ==
One of the roles of the president of the republic is to designate a candidate for the office of prime minister. The president must consult with the party that has the majority in the Parliament or, if no such majority exists, with the parties represented in Parliament.

Once designated, the candidate assembles a proposal for the governing program and submits it to the cabinet. The proposal must be approved by the Parliament within ten days through a motion of no confidence. The Parliament debates both the program and the cabinet membership in a joint session of the Chamber of Deputies and the Senate. The proposal is accepted only if a majority of all deputies and senators approve.

Once the vote of confidence is obtained, the candidate becomes the prime minister, and all cabinet members become ministers. The prime minister, the ministers, and other members of the Government take an oath before the president, as stipulated under Article 82 of the Constitution. The Government as a whole and each of its members exercise their mandate from the date of the oath.

== Functions ==
The prime minister directs the actions of the government and coordinates the activities of its members. The prime minister submits to the Chamber of Deputies or the Senate reports and statements on Government policy to be debated. As head of the government, the prime minister is charged with directing the internal policy of the country and leads the public administration. In this regard, the government cooperates with other interested social actors.

As with any other office of public authority, the office of the prime minister is incompatible with any other office, except that of deputy or senator and is also incompatible with a professional position in a commercial organization. The term of a prime minister ends with the individual's resignation, dismissal following a motion of no confidence, loss of electoral rights (following a conviction), incompatibility with the office, death or expiration of the term of the legislature. The prime minister, together with the minister tasked with the particular field of government, can sign resolutions and ordinances to take effect as executive orders the moment they are published in the Monitorul Oficial, the official gazette of the Romanian state. Such ordinances must be sent to the appropriate chamber of Parliament, where they are discussed urgently, and they are then sent to the official gazette. In case the noticed chamber does not discuss or approve said ordinance after 30 days of its arrival, the ordinance is officially adopted and published in the gazette. An emergency ordinance cannot modify a constitutional law or concern the functioning of the fundamental institutions, rights, or liberties.

Unlike in the president-parliamentary semi-presidential systems, such as Russia, the Romanian prime minister is not a subordinate of the president, as he cannot outright dismiss the prime minister. The president can attend the government meetings debating upon matters of national interest concerning foreign policy, country's defense, maintenance of public order, and, at the invitation of the prime minister, in other instances as well. The president will always chair the government meetings he attends.

In addition to his constitutional roles, the prime minister is, generally, the leader of the major party in the majority coalition that supports the government, although this is not always the case.

=== Relationship with Parliament ===
The Government and the other bodies of administration must submit all information, reports or documents requested by the Chamber of Deputies, Senate, or parliamentary committees as part of the parliamentary control of government.

The members of the government are allowed to attend the works of Parliament, and they must do so at the request of the presidents of the chambers. The prime minister and the members of his Cabinet must answer all questions or interpellations brought forward by deputies or senators under the terms laid down in the statutes of Parliament. After such interpellations, the Chamber or the Senate can adopt a simple motion to express their position towards an issue of internal or external politics.

Parliament can dismiss an outgoing prime minister and his cabinet by adopting a motion of no confidence against the government. For a motion to be initiated, it must be signed by at least a quarter of deputies and senators, and for it to pass, a majority of deputies and senators must vote in favour of it. After a motion of no confidence is adopted, the prime minister and his Cabinet are officially dismissed, and the President must designate an individual to form a new government. Since 1989, six prime ministers have been dismissed following the adoption of a motion of no confidence: Emil Boc (2009), Mihai Răzvan Ungureanu (2012), Sorin Grindeanu (2017), Viorica Dăncilă (2019), Ludovic Orban (2020), Florin Cîțu (2021) and Ilie Bolojan (2026).

== History ==
Originally styled President of the Council of Ministers, the office was first created in 1862 during the reign of Prince Alexandru Ioan Cuza. Cuza, unlike other monarchs of his time, was not a hereditary ruler. In 1859, he was elected Prince of Wallachia and Prince of Moldavia in two separate elections, thus de facto uniting the two principalities. By 1862, he had completely fused the two administrations into a single government with its capital at Bucharest, the new country bearing the name Romania, but the union was in danger of being dissolved after the end of his rule. A liberal, in favour of the two great reform projects envisioned by the liberals of the time (the electoral and agrarian reforms), Cuza did not publicly espouse his political preferences or position himself as the leader of a faction, preferring to keep the office of the Prince politically neutral. To give the country a political government, Cuza created the office of prime minister and brought into power the leader of the Conservative faction, Barbu Catargiu.

During the first years after its creation, the office held considerable authority, being able to challenge the will of the Prince and together with a Legislative Assembly composed mainly of conservatives and reactionaries, Catargiu's conservative government was able to delay the adoption of several reforms. Frustrated by the government's opposition to reforms and unable to work with an Assembly dominated by reactionary forces due to the censitary nature of the electoral system, Cuza launched a coup d'etat, followed by a constitutional referendum that replaced the Convention of Paris, an act that served as the constitution of the country, with his version named the Statute expanding the Paris Convention (Romanian: Statutul dezvoltător al Convenției de la Paris). The new constitution created the Senate for serving Cuza's legislative purposes and vested the office of the Prince with full executive authority while the prime minister remained his subordinate. Even though Cuza now had plenary powers, the office of the prime minister remained influential, and Mihail Kogălniceanu, the third prime minister, a liberal and former ally of Cuza, often clashed with him.

After Cuza's removal by coup d'état in 1866 by a coalition formed by both members of the liberal and conservative factions, the political forces of the time settled on two objectives: bringing a foreign prince from a European noble family onto the country's throne and drafting a liberal constitution. The 1866 Constitution confirmed that the prime minister served at the pleasure of the Prince, the latter being able to appoint and dismiss the former at any time and for any reason. Nevertheless, the prime minister still held considerable influence.

After World War I led to the creation of Greater Romania, another constitution was drafted in 1923 to reflect the changes the Romanian state had undergone since the Treaty of Versailles and the Treaty of Trianon. The new constitution limited the powers of the King, vesting the executive power entirely in the prime minister and his Cabinet, who now governed in the King's name after the latter appointed him. The new constitution also made the first steps towards a parliamentary control of the government, stipulating that either of the chambers may put ministers under accusation to stand trial.

== Office headquarters ==
The current Office Headquarters of the Prime Minister is the Victoria Palace.

Initially designed to be the headquarters of the Foreign Ministry, Victoria Palace was the headquarters of the Foreign Ministry and Council of Ministers during the Communist period and became, in 1990, the headquarters of the first government of post-communist Romania.

The palace was declared a historical monument in 2004.

== See also ==
- List of presidents of Romania
- List of heads of government of Romania
  - List of heads of government of Romania by time in office
