= Alexander Ulybyshev =

Russian writer on music (1794–1858)

Alexander Dmitriyevich Ulybyshev or Alexandre Oulibicheff (Russian: Александр Дмитриевич Улыбышев) (April 13, 1794 – February 5, 1858) was a Russian writer on music.

== Life ==
Ulybyshev was born in Dresden, the son of the Russian ambassador to the Electorate of Saxony (which was a sub-unit of the Holy Roman Empire). From 1816 to 1830, he served in the Russian Foreign Ministry, where his duties from 1825 to 1830 included editing the Journal de St.-Pétersbourg. He retired in 1830, with the rank of State Councillor.

He died at his estate in Lukino, near Nizhny Novgorod, on 24 January (Julian calendar; 5 February Gregorian calendar) 1858.

== Writings ==
Ulybyshev's three-volume Nouvelle biographie de Mozart (Dresden, 1843) was influential on nineteenth-century perceptions of the composer. It was later translated into German, and into Russian by Modest Ilyich Tchaikovsky.

His views were attacked by Wilhelm von Lenz in Beethoven et ses trois styles (Paris, 1855), to which Ulybyshev retaliated with Beethoven, ses critiques et ses glossateurs (Leipzig and Paris, 1857).

He also wrote a number of articles on music for the Journal de St.-Pétersbourg.

== Sources ==
- Geoffrey Norris and Edward Garden. "Ulïbïshev, Aleksandr Dmitryevich." Grove Music Online. Oxford Music Online. 26 May 2010.
- Profile of Ulybyshev, Apr. 4, 2006, by Voice of Russia.
