= France–Romania relations =

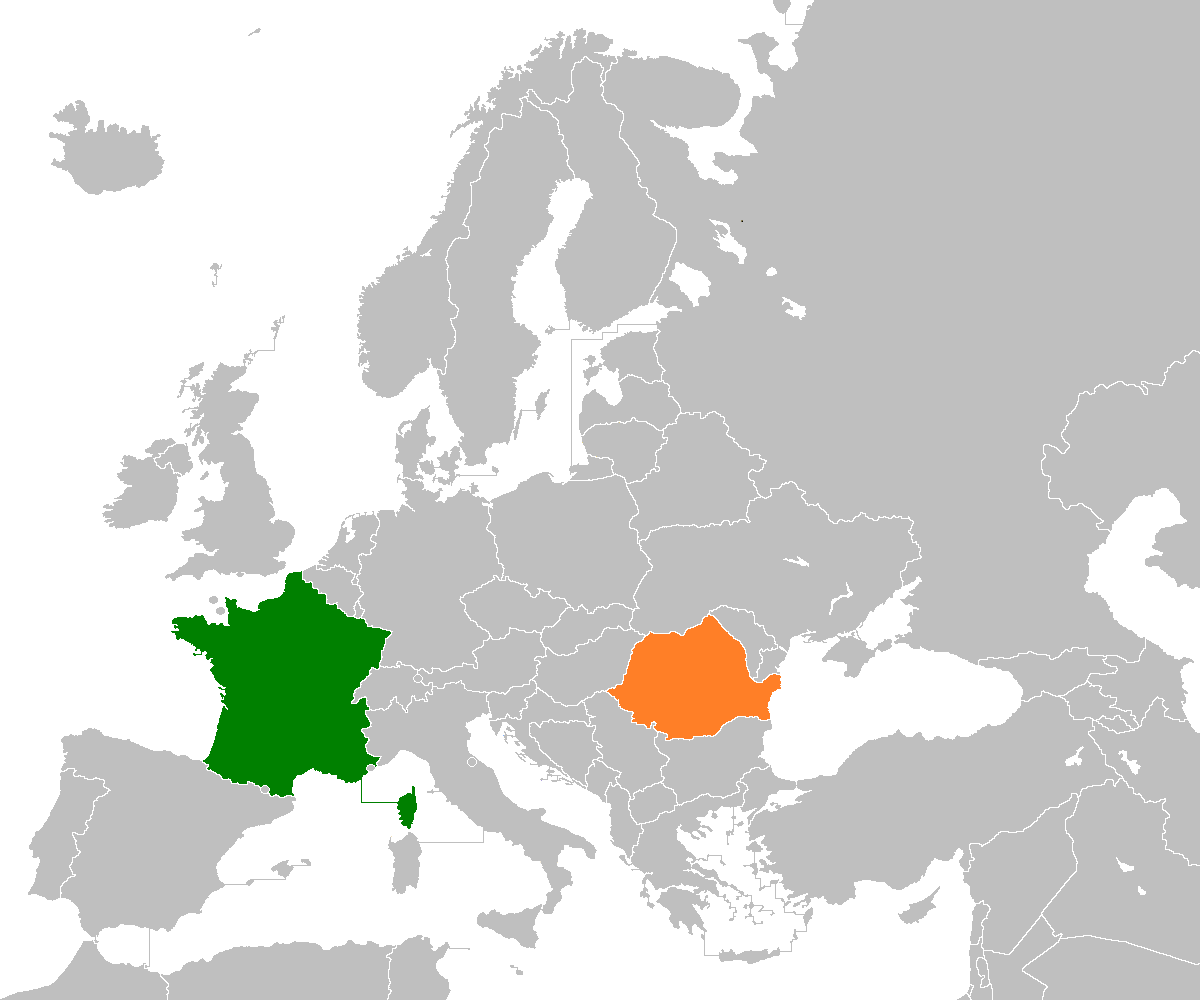
- France: Romania

France–Romania relations are bilateral foreign relations between France and Romania. Diplomatic relations between the two countries date back to 1880, when mutual legations were opened, although contacts between France and Romania's precursor states stretch into the Middle Ages.

Both countries are full members of the Council of Europe, the European Union and NATO. Romania has been a member of the Francophonie since 1993. France has given full support to Romania's membership in the European Union and NATO.

== History ==
=== Early relations ===
The first contacts between the Romanians and the French started in the late 14th century, when the French knights led by John of Nevers participated in the Battle of Nicopolis alongside Voivode Mircea the Elder and his soldiers. Between 1579 and 1583, King Henry III supported Petru Cercel in his bid for the Wallachian throne. During the 17th and 18th centuries, the relations between the French and the Romanians intensified due to the numerous French merchants and intellectuals who traveled to the Romanian Principalities. In 1762, Claude-Charles de Peyssonnel proposed the establishment of a French representation in the Principalities. A French consulate would be opened in 1798 in Bucharest, and a vice consulate in Iași. In the same year, the Courrier de Moldavie, the region's first French-language newspaper, appeared in Iași. France's cultural influence grew to such an extent that French became the diplomatic language of the Romanian principalities in the 18th century. At the beginning of the 19th century, the aspiring Romanian nobility sent their sons to study in Paris, where they embraced modern political ideas and French culture. In 1838, the Frenchman Jean-Alexandre Vaillant, who was teaching in Bucharest, published the first French-Romanian dictionary; as a result, French was taught in most schools in Bucharest and Iași. In 1846, Romanian students in Paris founded their own student association under the chairmanship of Ion Ghica and with C.A. Rosetti as secretary; The French poet Alphonse de Lamartine was elected honorary president. Many members of this association, including Dimitrie Bolintineanu, Mihail Kogălniceanu, and Nicolae Bălcescu, returned to Romania and became leaders of the Wallachian Revolution of 1848.

=== France and Independent Romania ===
In the second half of the 19th century, France and French ideas played a central role in the formation of the Romanian nation state. French Emperor Napoleon III actively supported the unification of the principalities of Moldavia and Wallachia in 1859, which is considered the founding of the modern Romanian state. In 1860, the French Emperor sent a French military mission to Romania. Leading French intellectuals such as Jules Michelet and Edgar Quinet campaigned for Romania's independence from the Ottoman Empire, which was declared in 1877. The first Romanian constitution of 1866 was largely based on the French model. The counties of Romania were also modeled on the French départements. After the Congress of Berlin in 1878, which recognized Romania sovereignty internationally, diplomatic relations started at legation level on 20 February 1880, with Mihail Kogălniceanu appointed as the first plenipotentiary minister of Romania in Paris. Close cultural ties existed in the following decades: the Romanian elite cultivated the French language, and King Carol I held audiences and even a crown council in French in 1914. In Bucharest, French was widely spoken among the educated classes and several French newspapers were published, earning the capital the nickname “Little Paris.” In 1896, the French Institute was founded in Bucharest, which subsequently became one of France's most important cultural mission abroad.

=== World wars and interwar period ===
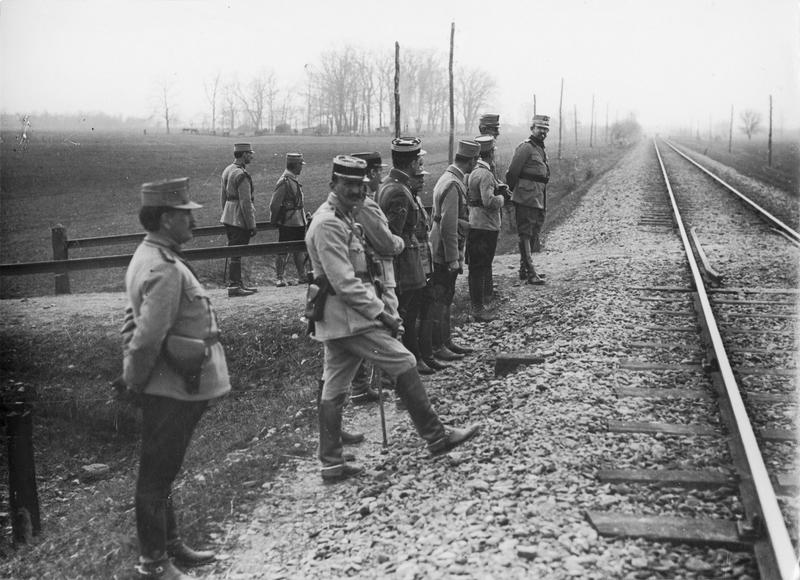
French soldiers in Romania during the First World War

In the First World War, Romania and France fought as allies from 1916 onwards, establishing a lasting brotherhood in arms between the two armies. After the end of the war, Romania was among the victorious powers at the Paris Peace Conference of 1919/20, and France supported the recognition of Greater Romania, which was created through the unification of Transylvania, Bessarabia, and Bukovina. French foreign policy in the 1920s and 1930s aimed to build military alliances with small nations in Eastern Europe to counter the threat of German attacks. Paris saw Romania as an ideal partner in this venture, especially from 1926 to 1939. The Romanian foreign minister, Nicolae Titulescu, maintained particularly close ties with France and has been considered responsible for the privileged friendship between the two countries in the interwar period. The end of this partnership was signaled by a statement made by both France and Great Britain towards the end of 1939 that the Kingdom of Romania would remain independent from both the Nazis and the Soviets. A few months later, the Axis powers would cross into French borders and sweep through the country. The annexation of Romanian territory through the Ribbentrop-Molotov pact caused distrust of then-ruling King Carol II, and following his forced abdication, the far-right military leader Ion Antonescu took control of the country. Within a two-year period, France and Romania had lost power to the Nazis, which would not be reclaimed until 1944–1945. In September 1944, after Romania switched sides away from the Axis, the Romanian government recognized the Free France of General de Gaulle and reestablished official relations with France.

=== France and Socialist Romania ===
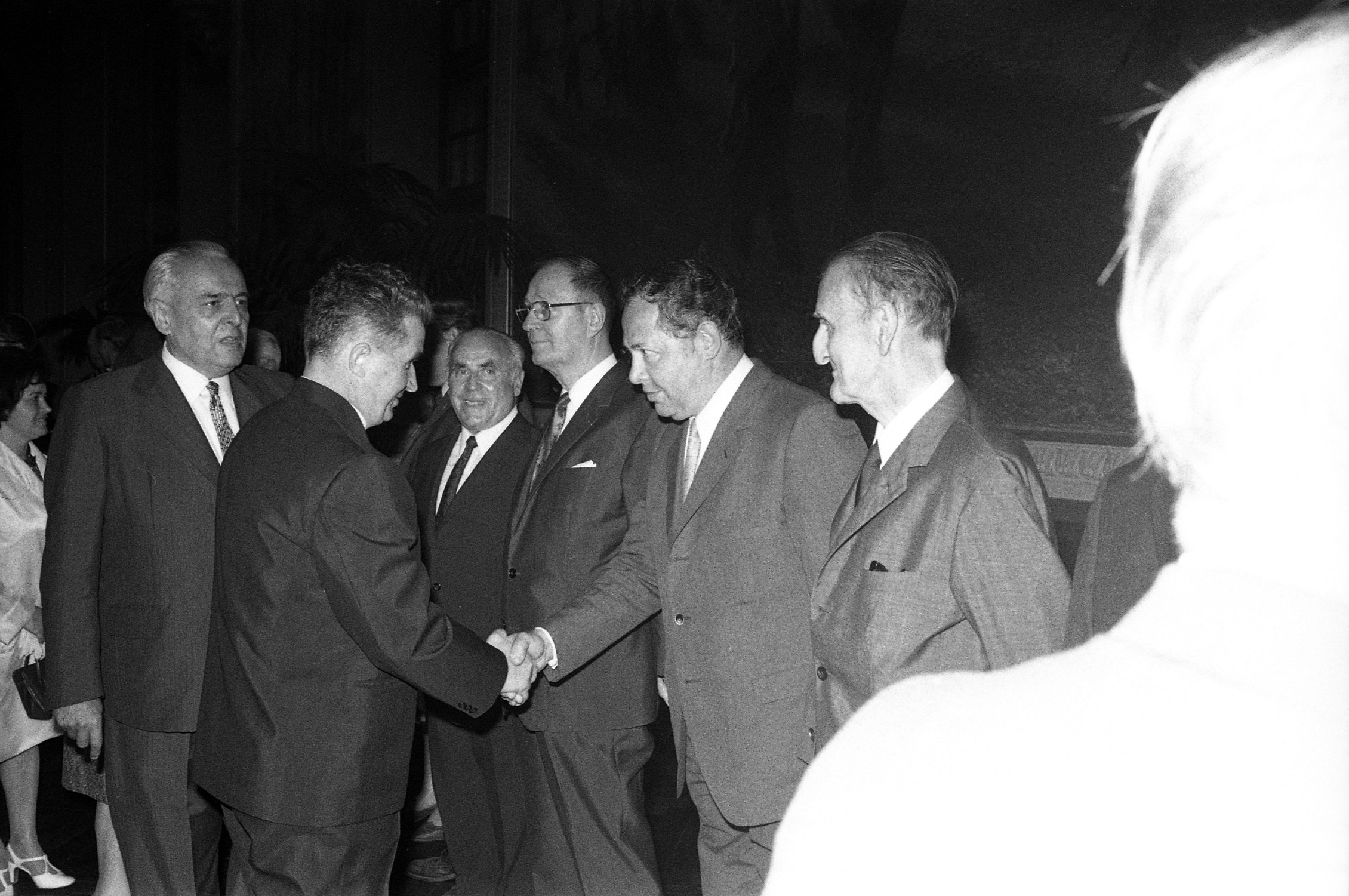
Nicolae Ceaușescu in Toulouse (1970)

After 1945, Romania fell under the influence of the Soviet Union and a communist regime was established, but diplomatic ties with France remained intact, unlike the relations of some other Eastern Bloc countries with Western countries. In the 1960s, under Gheorghe Gheorghiu-Dej and later Nicolae Ceaușescu, Romania pursued a somewhat more independent foreign policy within the Warsaw Pact, which was recognized and supported by France. A high point in this rapprochement was the historic visit of French President Charles de Gaulle to Romania in May 1968. Despite the ideological differences between the two countries behind the Iron Curtain, Romania's Ceaușescu began to lean toward Gaullism. In 1979 French president Valéry Giscard d'Estaing visited Bucharest and in 1980 he received Romanian president Ceaușescu as a guest in Paris. In 1982, however, French President François Mitterrand canceled a planned visit to Bucharest at short notice after it became known that the Romanian secret police Securitate had attacked the exiled writer and dissident Paul Goma. Overall, France maintained its benevolent contacts with Romania even in the late Ceaușescu era, although criticism of the human rights situation grew. In December 1989, France showed solidarity with the Romanian people during the revolution of 1989, which led to the fall of the communist regime.

=== Relations after 1989 ===
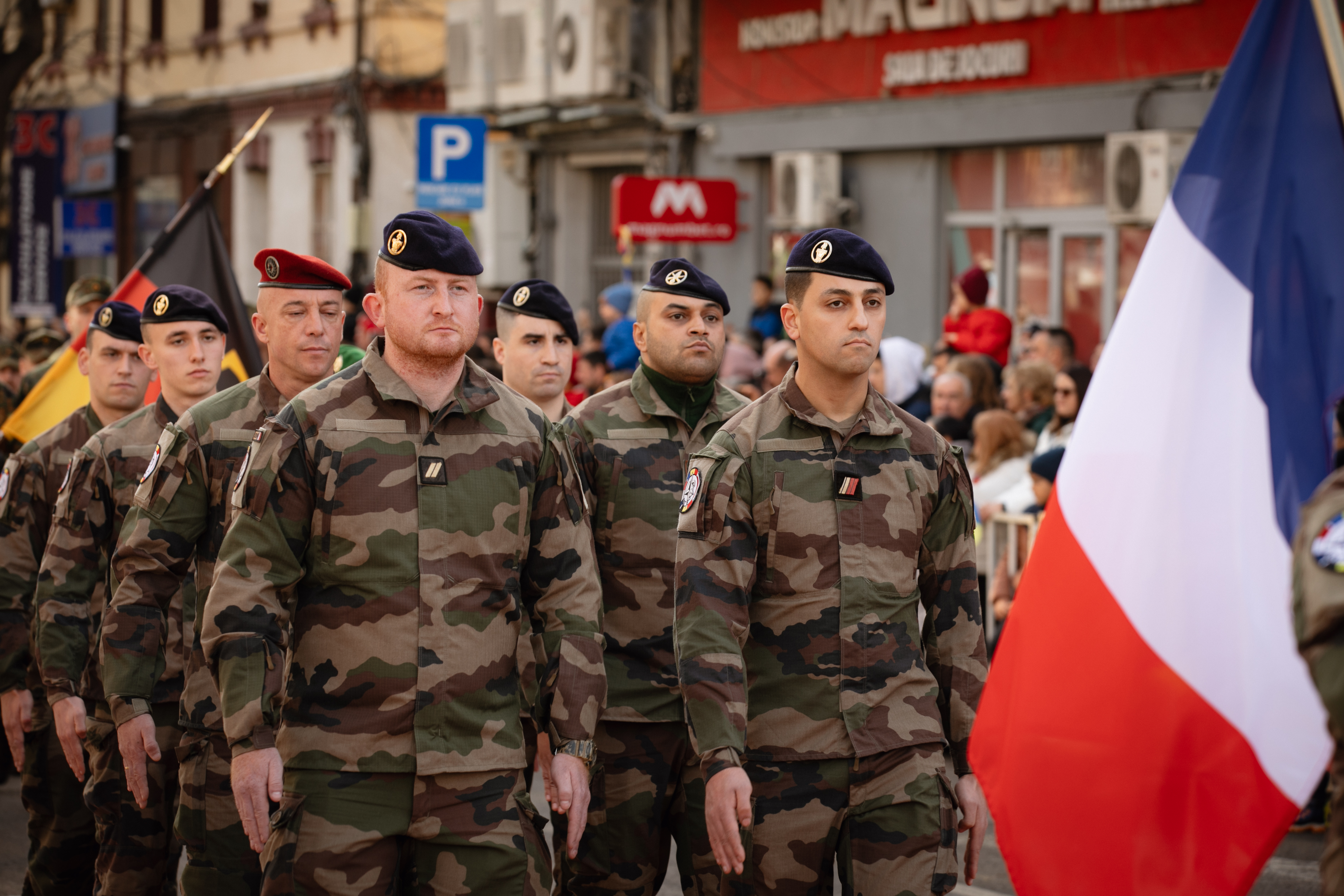
French Armed Forces march in Romanian National Day Parade (2023)

After the end of the Cold War, Romania and France quickly built up their relationship. In 1992, President François Mitterrand was the first Western leader to visit post-communist Romania, sending a clear signal that the two countries were getting closer again. In the 1990s, both countries established a close political, economic, and cultural partnership network. France was one of the strongest advocates of Romania's integration into Euro-Atlantic structures and strongly supported Romania's efforts to join NATO and the European Union. This support bore fruit: Romania joined NATO in 2004 and the EU in 2007, giving bilateral cooperation an institutional framework at the European level. On February 1, 2008, both countries signed a Joint Declaration on a Strategic Partnership, which establishes deeper cooperation in areas such as security, the economy, and culture, and has been updated in subsequent years. The countries have been working more closely together on security policy since the Ukraine crisis in 2014. France is leading a NATO unit in Romania and stationed troops to protect the alliance's eastern flank; President Emmanuel Macron personally visited French soldiers in Romania in June 2022.

== Economic relations ==
France is an important economic partner for Romania and consistently ranks among its three largest export markets and six most important import suppliers. Bilateral trade volume has risen sharply since the 1990s and stood at around €10 billion in 2022. France is also one of the largest investors in Romania. Over 4,000 companies in Romania are majority French-owned and directly employ more than 125,000 people; their total turnover accounts for around 7.5% of Romania's GDP. Almost all major French corporations (37 of the 40 companies listed on the CAC 40 index) are active in Romania.

From 1976 until 1994 the French automaker Citroën attempted to make profit with a socialist–capitalist joint venture. It built the Citroën Axel for Western markets, while branding it the Oltcit in Romania. Romania was seeking up-to-date technology to strengthen its weak industrial sector. Citroën wanted peripheral production centres with lower wages to lower production costs and reach new markets. In the long run the venture was a costly failure for several reasons. Supply lines were often interrupted so that production output fell short of expectations. Romanian factories were unable to produce flawless cars or meet delivery deadlines. Today, Dacia (as part of the Renault Group) accounts for approximately 8% of Romania's total exports.

The French multinational banking company Société Générale acquired the majority stake in the Romanian bank Banca Română pentru Dezvoltare in 1999, and renamed it BRD – Groupe Société Générale. It is the third largest bank in Romania by total assets and market share.

French construction company Colas Group has worked on the Romanian A2 motorway section between Cernavodă and Medgidia, between March 2009 and April 2011, when the contract was terminated by the National Company of Motorways and National Roads of Romania due to low progress from the French company.

France also plays a leading role in energy supply (Engie) and the telecommunications market (Orange). Last but not least, French retail chains such as Carrefour, Auchan, Cora, and Leroy Merlin dominate large parts of the Romanian retail sector.

== Cultural relations ==
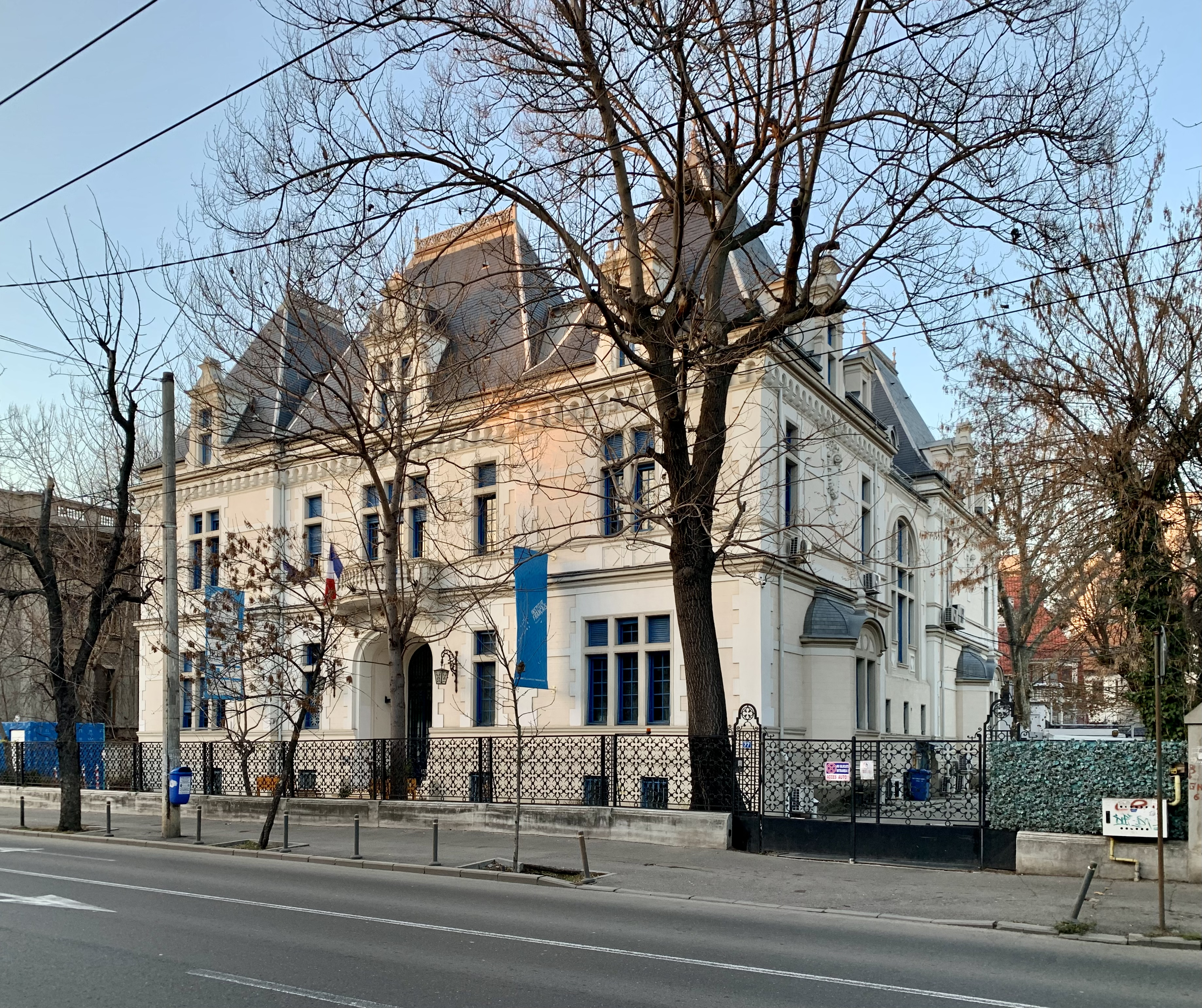
Institut français in Bucharest

The cultural ties between Romania and France are traditionally very close. Due to the linguistic similarities between the two Romance languages, many Romanian intellectuals regarded France as their “big sister” from an early stage, and the French language spread rapidly among the Romanian elite from the 18th century onwards. In the 19th and 20th centuries, Paris became an important center for Romanian artists and scholars in exile. Numerous important Romanians lived and worked in France, including the sculptor Constantin Brâncuși, the writers Eugen Ionescu (Eugène Ionesco) and Mircea Eliade, the philosopher Emil Cioran, the poet Anna de Noailles and the composer George Enescu, enriching the cultural life of both countries. After 1990, cultural relations intensified further: Romania joined the International Organization of La Francophonie in 1993. French is the most widely taught foreign language in Romanian schools after English. A dense network of French-Romanian educational institutions – including 23 bilingual high schools, Francophone degree programs at universities, and exchange programs – promotes language and cultural education. France is the third most popular destination for Romanian students (over 4,300 Romanian students were enrolled in France in 2021), and French students were the third largest group of foreign students in Romania, behind students from Moldova and Israel.

== Migration ==
In addition to culture, migration also shapes bilateral relations. As a result of the free movement of workers following Romania's accession to the EU in 2007, many Romanians settled in France. In 2023, a community of around 100,000 Romanian citizens lived in France.

== Resident diplomatic missions ==
- France has an embassy in Bucharest.
- Romania has an embassy in Paris and a consulates-general in Lyon, Marseille and Strasbourg.
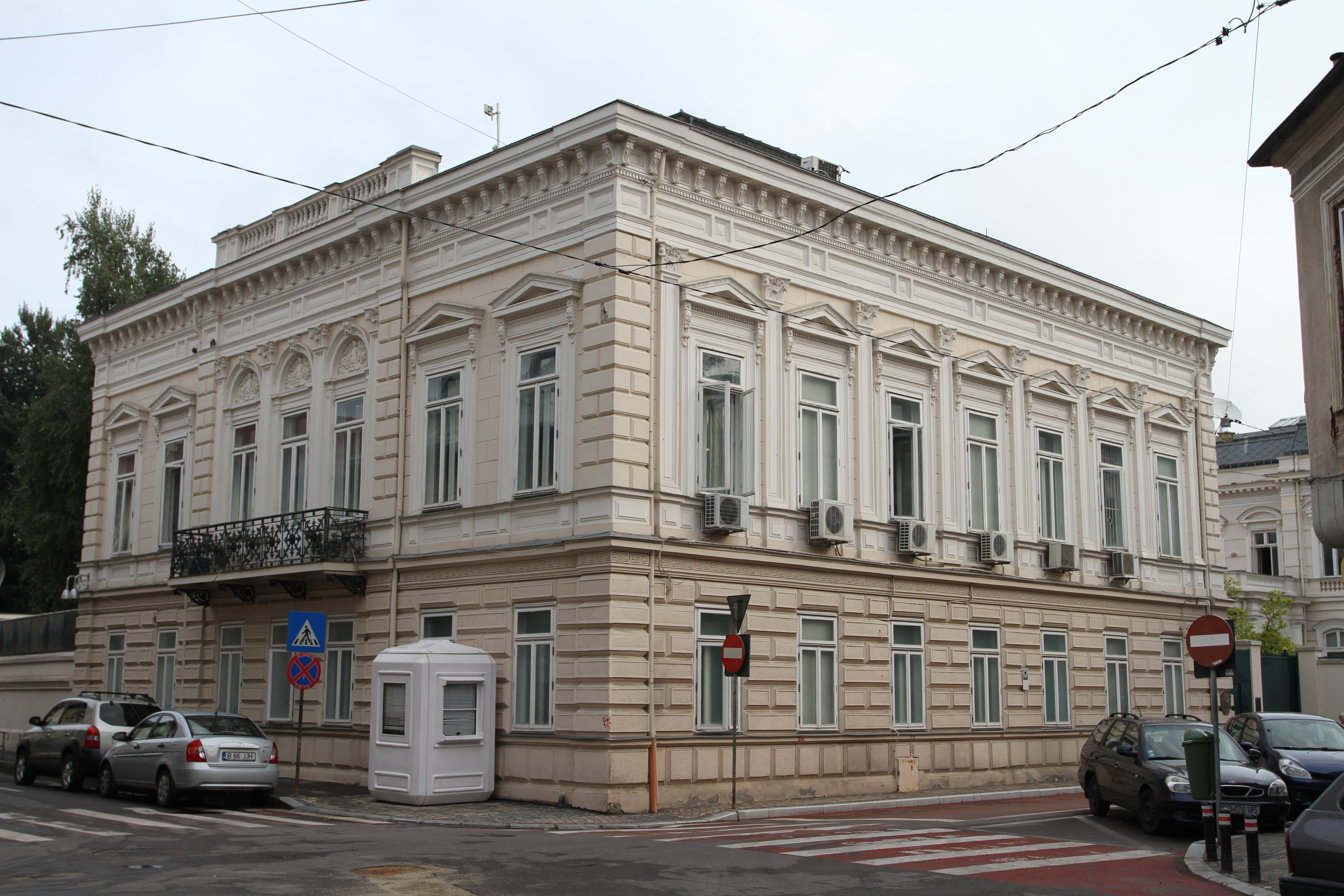
Embassy of France in Bucharest

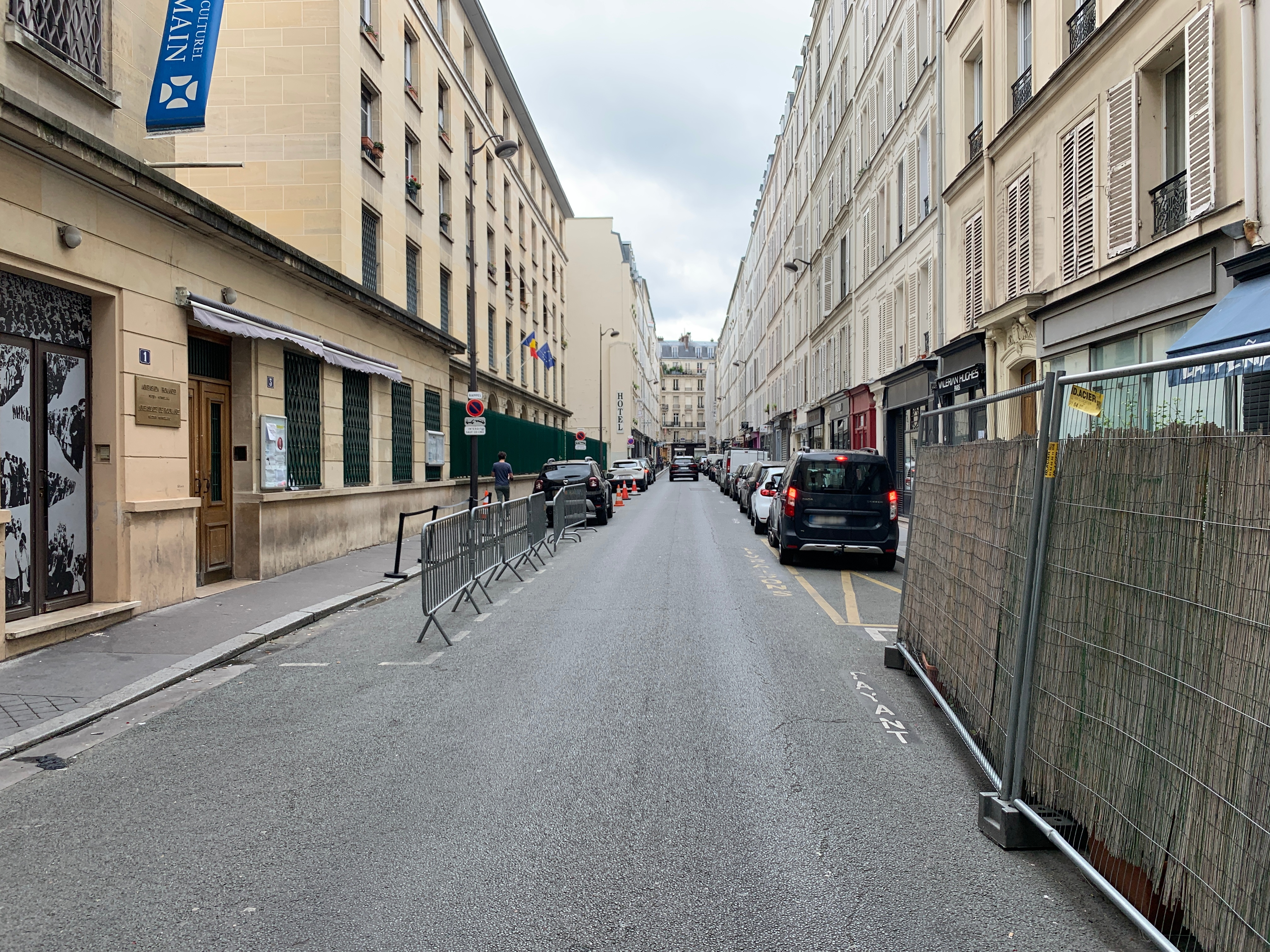
Embassy of Romania in Paris

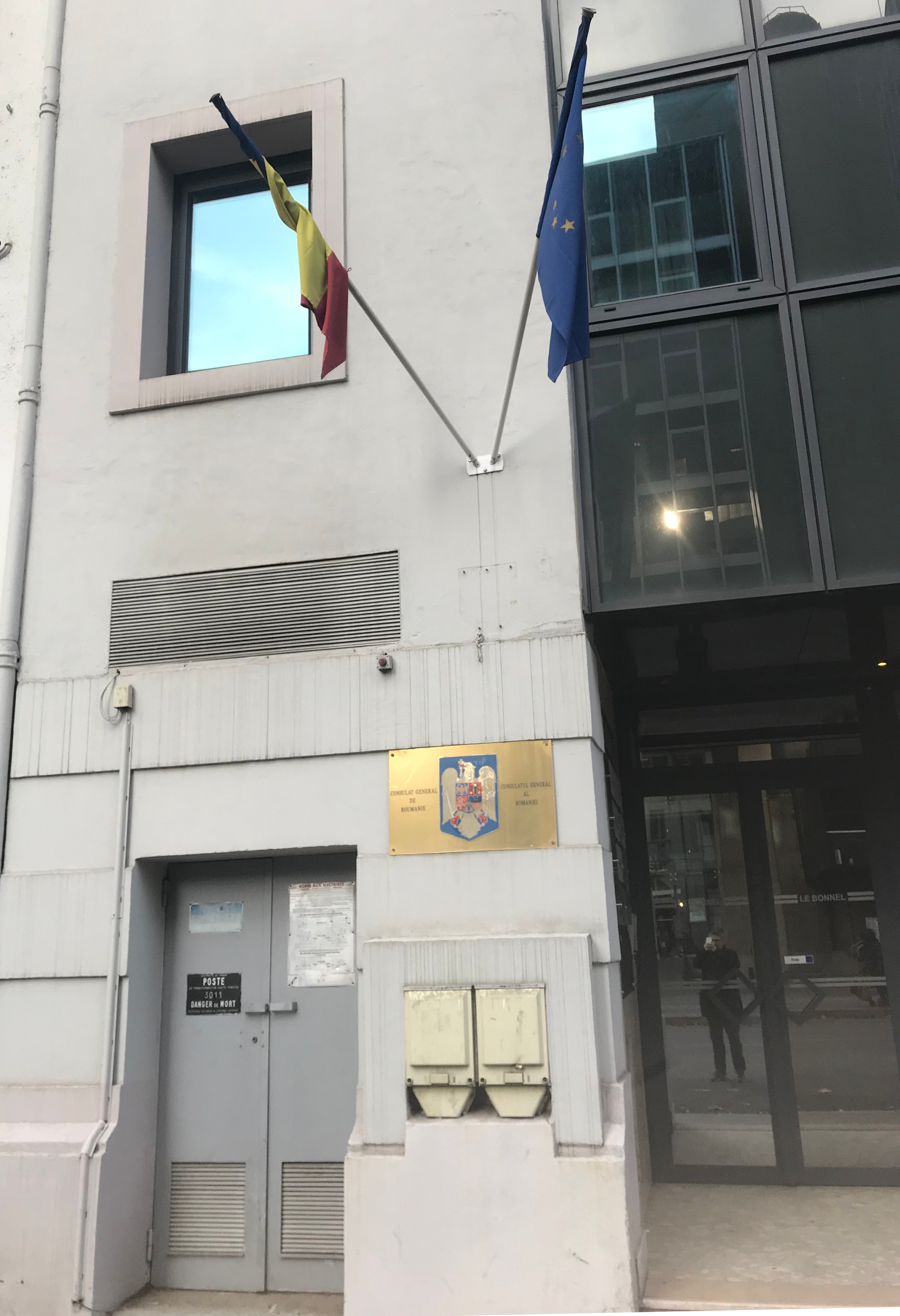
Consulate-General of Romania in Lyon

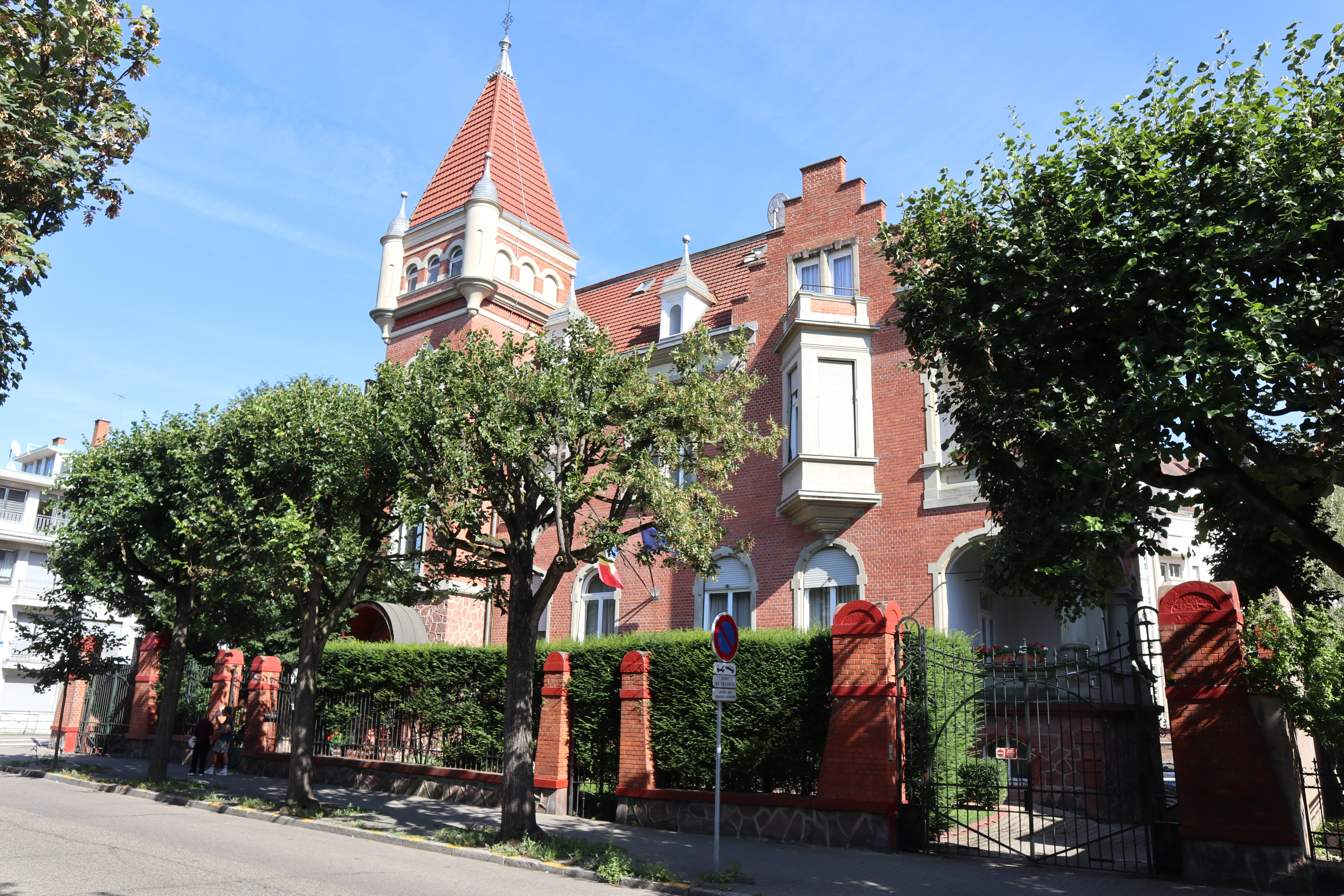
Consulate-General of Romania in Strasbourg

== See also ==
- Foreign relations of France
- Foreign relations of Romania
- Romanians in France
- Election to the Romanian throne 1866
