= Wilhelm von Lenz =

Wilhelm von Lenz (born 20 May 1809 in Riga – died 7 January 1883 in Saint Petersburg) was a Baltic German Russian official and writer. Wilhelm von Lenz was a friend and student of many mid-century Romantic composers, including Franz Liszt, Frédéric Chopin and Hector Berlioz, Lenz's most important and influential work was an early biography of the German composer Ludwig van Beethoven, entitled Beethoven et ses trois styles (1855), written in response to the disparagement of Beethoven by Alexander Ulybyshev in his Nouvelle biographie de Mozart (1843). Lenz promoted the idea (already suggested by earlier figures such as François-Joseph Fétis) that Beethoven's musical style be divided into three characteristic periods. Lenz's periodisation, with minor changes, is still widely used today by musicologists in discussing Beethoven's compositions.

== Selected works ==
- Beethoven. Eine Kunststudie, Band 1, Kassel 1855 (Digitalisat)
- Beethoven. Eine Kunststudie, Band 2, Kassel 1855 (Digitalisat)
- Beethoven. Eine Kunststudie, Band 3, Hamburg 1860 (Digitalisat)

== Writings ==
- Great Piano Virtuosos of Our Time. London: Kahn & Averill. 1983. ISBN 0-900707-77-1.
