= Historical Romanian ranks and titles =

This is a glossary of historical Romanian ranks and titles used in the principalities of Moldavia, Wallachia and Transylvania, and later in Romania. Many of these titles are of Slavic etymology, with some of Greek, Latin, and Turkish etymology; several are original (such as armaș, paharnic, jitnicer and vistiernic). Various boier titles correspond to various honorary services at the Court, but often they were associated with various actual governmental duties as well.

Mare (Romanian), vel (Slavic) or baș (Turkish) are composing parts used with other titles. Synonymous with the Byzantine "Megas", they precede a title or rank: Mare Vornic, Mare Stolnic, Vel Paharnic, Vel Pitar, Vel Logofăt, Baș Boier, etc.

== Middle Ages (1330/1359 — 1711/1716) ==
Name of the rank	Etymology	Description
Aprod	Hungarian apród	official in charge of justice or fiscal affairs, or introducing guest to the court.
Armaș	Romanian Armă, arm + suffix -aș	official in charge of security, prisons and executions.
Ban	probably Sarmatian, Persian or Avar	The title of medieval rulers of parts of Wallachia (Oltenia and Severin) since the 13th century. The Wallachian bans were military governors. Territory over which a ban ruled in Wallachia was called a banat (see article about Banat region).
Becer	Romanian beci, cellar (of Cuman origin)	court cook.
Boier	Slavic bolyarin	A hereditary aristocrat (boyars).
Cămăraș	Romanian cămară, pantry	person in charge of the rooms and pantries of the court.
Căminar	Romanian camină, tax, from Slavic	person in charge of collecting some taxes (initially the taxes for beeswax).
Chelar	Greek kellarios, ultimately from Latin cellarium, storeroom	person in charge of the court's cellars and food stores.
Clucer	Slavic kliučiari, from the word for "key"	a person in charge of the court household and servants, cf. Master of the Royal Court, Russian boyar title klyuchnik.
Cneaz	Slavic Knyaz, ultimately from Germanic	chieftain or judge of some villages
Condicar	Romanian condică, register book, from Greek kódik	person in charge of the court archives, archivist.
Comis	Greek kómis	Master of the Horse.
Cupar	Romanian cupă	boyar in charge with filling the cups at the boyar's table
Domn	Romanian a domni, to rule, Latin Dominus, lord/master	title of rulers of Wallachia and Moldavia "Domnul X..." = "Lord X..."
Domnitor	(he) who is the lord, from Romanian Domn, Lord	the official title of the ruler of Romania between 1859 and 1881 (also unofficially used earlier).
Dregător	Romanian a drege, to fix, to plan	general term referring to most officials at the court, with roles ranging from counsellorship to administration, justice or military organisation.
Jitnicer	Romanian jitniță, granary, from Slavic žitnica, derived from žito, rye	person in charge of the court granary.
Jude	Latin judex, cf Romanian județ, a jurisdiction generally translated as "county"	judge and/or mayor of a region.
Grămătic	Greek grammatikós	secretary.
Hatman	cf. Hetman, from Polish, ultimately from German	a Moldavian equivalent of spătar.
Hospodar	South Slavic gospodar	title of rulers of Wallachia and Moldavia in Slavic documents.
Ispravnic	Slavic izpravnik	a representative of the Domnitor in a county.
Logofăt	Greek logothetēs	chancellor.
Medelnicer	Slavic "medelnica", copper wash-basin	a boier title; literally, the person who pours water on hands to wash them before meals.
Paharnic	Slavic root "bowl"/"goblet"/"cup" (pohar/pucharz) cf. Romanian pahar, "glass"	person in charge of the wine supplies, loosely corresponds to "Royal Cup-bearer", akin to Polish Cześnik, but with a different etymology.
Pârcălab	Hungarian porkoláb	head of a county (județ in Wallachia, ținut in Moldavia) or a fort.
Pârgar	German Bürger, via Hungarian polgár.	member of the local council of a town.
Pitar	from Pita bread	bread supplier of the court.
Polcovnic	cf. Polkovnik	commander of a regiment.
Portar	Romanian Poartă, gate	Gatekeeper, for example Portar de Suceava.
Postelnic	Slavic postel, "bed"; cf. Russian postelnichy	a boier title; literally "a person in charge of royal chambers"; loosely corresponds to Chamberlain.
Șătrar	South Slavic šatra	boyar in charge of the watch of the military camp during war.
Sfetnic	Slavic suvetnik	voivode/domnitor's adviser.
Spătar	Greek spatharios	In Wallachia, holder of the royal sword and bludgeon and second in rank in the army after the voivode.
Staroste	Slavic Starosta	guildmaster, the leader of a guild (breaslă in Moldavia, isnaf in Wallachia).
Stolnic	Slavic Stolnik	a boier rank and the position at the court in the history of Moldavia and Wallachia, a seneschal; a person in charge of the royal table.
Sluger	Slavic služar	person in charge of meat supplies for the court.
Vătaf	Slavic vatah	overseer of various kinds (Vătaful divanului, Vătaf de agie, Vătaf de plai, Vătaf de hotar, etc.).
Vistier	Latin vestiarius, a person in charge of the wardrobe	a title of treasurer.
Voievod	Slavic Voivode	ruling prince, commander-in-chief of the army, titles of the Wallachian and Moldavian rulers; they were also known as domnitori.
Vodă	Diminutive of voievod	Title of rulers of Wallachia and Moldavia. "X-vodă..." = "Prince X..."
Vornic	cf. Slovak nádvorník	official in charge of justice and internal affairs

== Phanariote era (1711/1716 — 1821) ==
Name of the rank	Etymology	Description
Aga	Turkish ağa, military commander.	chief of a law enforcement agency (agie)
Alaiceauș	Turkish alay and çavuş	master of ceremonies
Beizadea	Turkish beyzade	hospodar's son (during the Phanariote period).
Binișliu	Turkish binişli	court waiter.
Buhurdargiu	Turkish buhurdur	person in charge with the court spice pot
Cafegiu	Turkish kahveci	persons who served the coffee at the court.
Caftangiu	caftan, mantle, of Turkish origin.	person who put the boyarial mantle on the back of the new appointed boyars.
Calemgiu	Turkish kalemcı	clerk.
Capuchehaie	Turkish kapikâhaya	diplomatic representative of the Wallachian/Moldavian rulers to the Ottoman court.
Capugiu	Turkish kapucu	guard of the Sultan and executer of secret orders, including deposing or assassinating of the princes of Wallachia and Moldavia
Caraghios	Turkish karagöz	court buffoon
Cavas-bașa	Turkishkavas and baş	court servant who guarded the door of the prince's room.
Ceauș	Turkish çavuş	messenger or doorman
Chehaia	Turkish kehaya	representative of the Domnitor at the Ottoman court.
Ciohodar	Turkish çuhadar	person in charge of the shoes of the ruler.
Ciubucciu	Turkish çubukçu	person in charge of the pipes (çubuk) of the ruler.
Divan Efendi	Turkish	Ottoman clerk who worked as a translator at the court, who was also a spy of the Sultan
Divictar	Turkish divitdar	court clerk in charge with the ink and writing supplies.
Dragoman	Greek dragomános	interpreter, translator.
Gealat	Turkish cellât	executioner.
Geamgirgiu	Turkish	servant in charge of the prince's bedsheets.
Gus-bașa	Turkish	servant in charge of the books with the boyar's ranks.
Ibrictar	Turkish	servant who was in charge of the kettle which held the water for washing prince's hands.
Iciolan	Turkish içoğlan	boy servant
Idicliu	Turkish	servant in charge of the horses
Isbașa	Turkish	clerk in charge with the petitions at the Court.
Iuzbața	Turkish yüz, a hundred	commander over the hundred soldiers who defended the Court
Lipcan	Turkish lipkan	official courier between the Porte and the Wallachian and Moldavian Courts.
Mabeemgiu	Turkish	servant in charge with the mabeems (chambers dedicated to the dregători)
Mazil	Turkish mazul or Southern Russian mazil (landowner)	boiar of the landed gentry holding no public function.
Mehmendar	Turkish mihmandar	a boyar accompanying the ruler, taking care of the lodging.
Meteregiu	Turkish	a servant in charge with the prince's washing basin
Mucurdar, Muhurdar, Muhardagiu	Turkish mühürdar	a person in charge with the Court's seals.
Mumbașir	Turkish mübaşir	tax collector
Nerghelegiu	Turkish nargileci	servant in charge with the prince's nargile
Nazâr	Turkish nāzır	governor of a Turkish city (such as the Turkish fortresses on the Danube)
Paia	Turkish pāye	boyar without a public function
Pehlivan	Turkish Pehlivan	acrobat of the court, often brought from Constantinople.
Peschirigi-bașa	Turkish	servant in charge with giving to the prince the towel for drying himself.
Rahtivan	Turkish	servant in charge with the prince's horse harnesses.
Serdar	from Turkish sardar, ultimately from Persian	commander of an army.
Ṣeitar		court buffoon

== See also ==
- Boyars of Wallachia and Moldavia
- Historical Romanian taxes
- Elections to the Romanian throne 1866
