= Journal de St.-Pétersbourg =

French-language newspaper published in Saint Petersburg, Russia

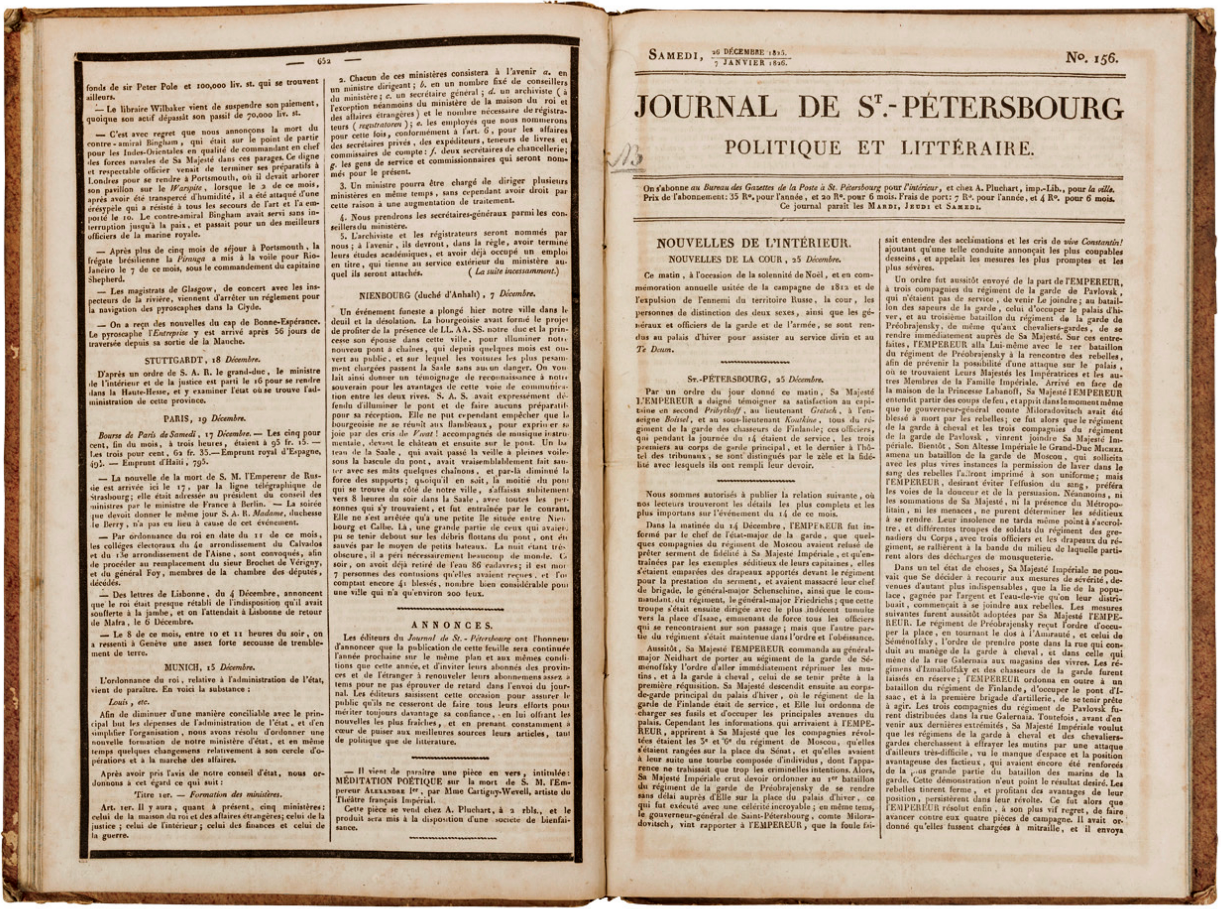
- Founded: 1825
- Ceased publication: 1914
- Language: French
- Headquarters: Saint Petersburg, Russia

The Journal de St.-Pétersbourg or Journal de Saint-Pétersbourg was a French-language newspaper, published in Saint Petersburg, Russia, with varying periodicity and some interruptions, from 1825 to 1914. For at least some of this period it was an official or semi-official organ of the Russian Foreign Ministry.
