= 1864 Romanian constitutional referendum =

Constitutional referendum

A constitutional referendum was held in United Principalities on 4 June [O.S. 23 May]–7 June [O.S. 26 May] 1864. The proposals were approved by 99.81% of voters.

== Background ==
The Paris Convention (19 August [O.S. 7 August] 1858) remained the governing document following the election of Alexandru Ioan Cuza as Domnitor over the United Principalities (1859). After the referendum, the Paris Convention was replaced by Cuza's own organic law, entitled "Statute expanding the Paris Convention" (Statutul dezvoltător al Convenției de la Paris). The Senate of Romania was created following the referendum, called Corpul Ponderator (Ponderative Body).

== Results ==
Choice	Votes	%
For	682,621	99.81
Against	1,307	0.19
Total	683,928	100.00
Registered voters/turnout	754,148	–
Source: Direct Democracy
