= Descendants of Paul I of Russia =

Paul I of Russia and his consort Maria Feodorovna, via nine children that lived to adulthood, had 30 legitimate grandchildren.

Moreover, through their grandchildren, Paul and Maria are ancestors of many European royals, including Carl XVI Gustaf of Sweden, Willem-Alexander of the Netherlands, Felipe VI of Spain, Charles III of the United Kingdom, and Frederik X of Denmark.

== Children ==
Image	Name	Birth	Death	Family
	Alexander I of Russia	12 December 1777	19 November 1825	Married Princess Louise of Baden in 1793 and had issue.
	Grand Duke Konstantin Pavlovich of Russia	27 April 1779	15 June 1831	Married Princess Juliane of Saxe-Coburg-Saalfeld in 1796. They had no issue and the marriage was annulled in 1820. Married morganatically Joanna Grudzińska in 1820. No surviving issue. Konstantin had three illegitimate children, one of whom was Konstantin Konstantinov.
	Grand Duchess Alexandra Pavlovna of Russia, Archduchess of Austria	9 August 1783	16 March 1801	Married Archduke Joseph of Austria, Palatine of Hungary in 1799. They had one daughter. Both mother and child died soon after birth.: Archduchess Alexandrina Paulina of Austria (born and died 8 March 1801)
	Grand Duchess Elena Pavlovna, Hereditary Princess of Mecklenburg-Schwerin	13 December 1784	24 September 1803	Married Frederick Louis, Hereditary Grand Duke of Mecklenburg-Schwerin in 1799 and had issue.
	Maria Pavlovna, Grand Duchess of Saxe-Weimar-Eisenach	4 February 1786	23 June 1859	Married Charles Frederick, Grand Duke of Saxe-Weimar-Eisenach in 1804 and had issue.
	Grand Duchess Catherine Pavlovna of Russia, Queen of Württemberg	21 May 1788	9 January 1819	Married Duke George of Oldenburg in 1809 with issue. Married secondly William I of Württemberg in 1816 with issue.
	Grand Duchess Olga Pavlovna of Russia	22 July 1792	26 January 1795	Died in infancy following complications of a tooth abscess.
	Grand Duchess Anna Pavlovna of Russia, Queen of the Netherlands	7 January 1795	1 March 1865	Married William II of the Netherlands in 1816 with issue.
	Nicholas I of Russia	25 June 1796	18 February 1855	Married Princess Charlotte of Prussia in 1817 with issue.
	Grand Duke Michael Pavlovich of Russia	8 February 1798	9 September 1849	Married Princess Charlotte of Württemberg in 1824 with issue. He also had an illegitimate child with his mistress Karolina Karlovna Stieglitz. She was adopted by Baron Alexander von Stieglitz: Nadezhda Mikhailovna Yunina (1 December 1843 – 9 July 1908), married with issue.

== Grandchildren ==
=== Children of Alexander I ===
Image	Name	Birth	Death	Family
	Grand Duchess Maria Alexandrovna of Russia	29 May 1799	8 July 1800	Died in infancy.
	Grand Duchess Elizabeth Alexandrovna of Russia	15 November 1806	12 May 1808	Died in infancy of an infection.

=== Children of Grand Duchess Elena Pavlovna, Hereditary Princess of Mecklenburg-Schwerin ===
Image	Name	Birth	Death	Family
	Paul Frederick, Grand Duke of Mecklenburg-Schwerin	15 September 1800	7 March 1842	Married Princess Alexandrine of Prussia in 1822 and had issue. Paul Frederick also had illegitimate children with his mistress Countess Catharina von Hauke.: Catharina (1830–1834), died in childhood.; Paul Friedrich (1832–1903); Alexander (1833–1833), died in infancy.; Helene Catharina (1835–1915), died unmarried.
	Duchess Marie Louise of Mecklenburg-Schwerin, Duchess of Saxe-Altenburg	31 March 1803	26 October 1862	Married Georg, Duke of Saxe-Altenburg in 1825 with issue.

=== Children of Maria Pavlovna, Grand Duchess of Saxe-Weimar-Eisenach ===
Image	Name	Birth	Death	Family
	Prince Paul of Saxe-Weimar-Eisenach	25 September 1805	10 April 1806	Died in infancy.
	Princess Marie of Saxe-Weimar-Eisenach	3 February 1808	18 January 1877	Married Prince Charles of Prussia in 1827 with issue.
	Augusta of Saxe-Weimar-Eisenach, German Empress	30 September 1811	7 January 1890	Married Wilhelm I in 1829 with issue.
	Charles Alexander, Grand Duke of Saxe-Weimar-Eisenach	24 June 1818	5 January 1901	Married his first cousin Princess Sophie of the Netherlands in 1842 with issue.

=== Children of Catherine Pavlovna, Duchess of Oldenburg and Queen of Württemberg ===
Image	Name	Birth	Death	Family
	Duke Peter Georg Paul Alexander of Oldenburg	30 August 1810	16 November 1829	Died young.
	Duke Peter of Oldenburg	26 August 1812	14 May 1881	Married Princess Therese of Nassau-Weilburg in 1837 with issue.
	Princess Maria Friederike Charlotte of Württemberg	30 October 1816	4 January 1887	Married Count Alfred von Neipperg in 1840 without issue.
	Princess Sophie of Württemberg, Queen of the Netherlands	17 June 1818	3 June 1877	Married her first cousin William III of the Netherlands in 1839 with issue.

=== Children of Anna Pavlovna, Queen of the Netherlands ===
Image	Name	Birth	Death	Family
	William III of the Netherlands	19 February 1817	23 November 1890	Married his first cousin Princess Sophie of Württemberg in 1839 with issue. Married secondly Princess Emma of Waldeck and Pyrmont in 1879 with issue.
	Prince Alexander of the Netherlands	2 August 1818	20 February 1848	Died unmarried.
	Prince Henry of the Netherlands	13 June 1820	13 January 1879	Married Princess Amalia of Saxe-Weimar-Eisenach in 1853 without issue. Married Princess Marie of Prussia in 1879 without issue.
	Prince Ernest Casimir of the Netherlands	21 May 1822	22 October 1822	Died in infancy.
	Princess Sophie of the Netherlands, Grand Duchess of Saxe-Weimar-Eisenach	8 April 1824	23 March 1897	Married her first cousin Charles Alexander, Grand Duke of Saxe-Weimar-Eisenach in 1842 with issue.

=== Children of Nicholas I of Russia ===
Image	Name	Birth	Death	Family
	Alexander II	29 April 1818	13 March 1881	Married Princess Marie of Hesse in 1841 with issue. Married morganatically his long time mistress Princess Catherine Dolgorukova in 1880, legitimising their issue.
	Grand Duchess Maria Nikolaevna, Duchess of Leuchtenberg	18 August 1819	21 February 1876	Married Maximilian de Beauharnais, 3rd Duke of Leuchtenberg in 1839 with issue.
	Grand Duchess Olga Nikolaevna of Russia, Queen of Württemberg	11 September 1822	30 October 1892	Married Charles I of Württemberg in 1846 without issue. They adopted their niece Grand Duchess Vera Konstantinovna of Russia
	Grand Duchess Alexandra Nikolaevna, Princess Frederick William of Hesse-Kassel	24 June 1825	10 August 1844	Married Prince Frederick William of Hesse-Kassel in 1844. She gave birth to a son prematurely, shortly before her death, Wilhelm. He died that same day.
	Grand Duke Konstantin Nikolaevich	21 September 1827	25 January 1892	Married Princess Alexandra of Saxe-Altenburg in 1848 with issue.
	Grand Duke Nicholas Nikolaevich	8 August 1831	25 April 1891	Married Duchess Alexandra of Oldenburg in 1856 with issue. He also had several illegitimate children with his mistress Catherine Chislova.: Olga Nikolaevna Nikolaeva (10 June 1868 – 31 August 1950), married with issue.; Vladimir Nikolaevich Nikolaev (4 June 1873 – 28 January 1942), married with issue.; Catherine Nikolaevna Nikolaeva (1874 - 26 January 1940); Nicholas Nikolaevich Nikolaev (16 April 1875 – 9 January 1902), married with issue.; Galina Nikolaevna Nikolaeva (28 January 1877 – 3 August 1878), died in infancy.
	Grand Duke Michael Nikolaevich	25 October 1832	18 December 1909	Married Princess Cecilie of Baden in 1857 with issue.

=== Children of Grand Duke Michael Pavlovich of Russia ===
Image	Name	Birth	Death	Family
	Grand Duchess Maria Mikhailovna of Russia	9 March 1825	19 November 1846	Died young.
	Grand Duchess Elizabeth Mikhailovna, Duchess of Nassau	26 May 1826	28 January 1845	Married Adolphe, Duke of Nassau in 1844. Elizabeth died giving birth to a daughter who did not survive.
	Grand Duchess Catherine Mikhailovna, Duchess Georg August of Mecklenburg-Strelitz	28 August 1827	12 May 1894	Married Duke Georg August of Mecklenburg-Strelitz in 1851 with issue.
	Grand Duchess Alexandra Mikhailovna of Russia	28 January 1831	27 March 1832	Died in infancy.
	Grand Duchess Anna Mikhailovna of Russia	27 October 1834	22 March 1836	Died in infancy.

== Great Grandchildren ==
=== Children of Paul Frederick, Grand Duke of Mecklenburg-Schwerin ===
Image	Name	Birth	Death	Family
	Frederick Francis II, Grand Duke of Mecklenburg-Schwerin	28 February 1823	15 April 1883	Married Princess Augusta Reuss of Köstritz in 1849 with issue.: Frederick Francis III, Grand Duke of Mecklenburg-Schwerin (19 March 1851 – 10 April 1897), married with issue.; Duke Paul Frederick of Mecklenburg (19 September 1852 – 17 May 1923), married with issue.; Duchess Marie of Mecklenburg-Schwerin (14 May [O.S. 2 May] 1854 – 6 September 1920), married with issue.; Duke Nikolaus of Mecklenburg-Schwerin (18 August 1855 – 23 January 1856), died in infancy.; Duke John Albert of Mecklenburg (8 December 1857 – 16 February 1920), married without issue.; Duke Alexander of Mecklenburg-Schwerin (13 August 1859 – 13 August 1859); Married Princess Anna of Hesse and by Rhine in 1864 with issue.: Duchess Anna of Mecklenburg-Schwerin (7 April 1865 – 8 February 1882), died young.; Married Princess Marie of Schwarzburg-Rudolstadt in 1868 with issue.: Duchess Elisabeth Alexandrine of Mecklenburg-Schwerin (10 August 1869 – 3 September 1955), married with issue.; Duke Friedrich Wilhelm of Mecklenburg-Schwerin (5 April 1871 – 22 September 1897), died unmarried.; Duke Adolf Friedrich of Mecklenburg-Schwerin (10 October 1873 – 5 August 1969), married with issue.; Duke Henry of Mecklenburg-Schwerin (19 April 1876 – 3 July 1934), married with issue.
	Duchess Luise of Mecklenburg-Schwerin, Princess of Windisch-Graetz	17 May 1824	9 March 1859	Married Hugo, 2nd Prince of Windisch-Graetz in 1849 with issue.: Princess Alexandra of Windisch-Graetz (1850–1933), married.; Princess Olga of Windisch-Graetz (1853–1934), married.; Hugo, 3rd Prince of Windisch-Graetz (17 November 1854 – 15 May 1920), married with issue.; Princess Marie of Windisch-Graetz, Duchess of Mecklenburg-Schwerin (11 December 1856 – 9 August 1929), married with issue.
	Duke William of Mecklenburg-Schwerin	5 March 1827	28 July 1879	Married Princess Alexandrine of Prussia in 1865 with issue.: Duchess Charlotte of Mecklenburg-Schwerin (7 November 1868 – 20 December 1944), married with issue.

=== Children of Marie Louise of Mecklenburg-Schwerin, Duchess of Saxe-Altenburg ===
Image	Name	Birth	Death	Family
	Ernst I, Duke of Saxe-Altenburg	16 September 1826	7 February 1908	Married Princess Agnes of Anhalt-Dessau in 1853 with issue.: Princess Marie of Saxe-Altenburg (2 August 1854 – 8 October 1898), married with issue.; Prince Georg of Saxe-Altenburg (1 February 1856 – 29 February 1856), died in infancy.
	Prince Albrecht Frederick August	31 October 1827	28 May 1835	Died in childhood.
	Prince Moritz of Saxe-Altenburg	24 October 1829	13 May 1907	Married Princess Augusta of Saxe-Meiningen in 1862 with issue.: Princess Marie Anne of Saxe-Altenburg, Princess of Schaumburg-Lippe (14 March 1864 – 3 May 1918), married with issue.; Princess Elisabeth of Saxe-Altenburg, Grand Duchess of Russia (25 January [O.S. 13 January] 1865 – 24 March 1927), married with issue.; Princess Margarethe of Saxe-Altenburg (22 May 1867 – 17 June 1882), died young.; Ernst II, Duke of Saxe-Altenburg (31 August 1871 – 22 March 1955), married with issue.; Princess Louise Charlotte of Saxe-Altenburg (11 August 1873 – 14 April 1953), married with issue.

=== Children of Princess Marie of Saxe-Weimar-Eisenach ===
Image	Name	Birth	Death	Family
	Prince Frederick Charles of Prussia	20 March 1828	15 June 1885	Married Princess Maria Anna of Anhalt-Dessau in 1854 with issue.: Princess Marie of Prussia (14 September 1855 – 20 June 1888), married with issue.; Princess Elisabeth of Prussia, Hereditary Grand Duchess of Oldenburg (8 February 1857 – 28 August 1895), married with issue.; Princess Anna of Prussia (26 February 1858 – 6 May 1858), died in infancy.; Princess Louise Margaret of Prussia, Duchess of Connaught and Strathearn (25 July 1860 – 14 March 1917), married with issue.; Prince Friedrich Leopold of Prussia (14 November 1865 – 13 September 1931), married with issue.
	Princess Louise of Prussia	1 March 1829	10 May 1901	Married Alexis, Landgrave of Hesse-Philippsthal-Barchfeld in 1854 without issue. They divorced in 1861.
	Princess Anna of Prussia, Landgravine of Hesse	17 May 1836	12 June 1918	Married Prince Frederick William of Hesse-Kassel (widower of Grand Duchess Alexandra Nikolaevna of Russia) in 1853 with issue.: Frederick William III, Landgrave of Hesse (15 October 1854 – 14 October 1888), died unmarried.; Princess Elisabeth of Hesse-Kassel, Hereditary Princess of Anhalt (13 June 1861 – 7 June 1955), married with issue.; Alexander Frederick, Landgrave of Hesse (25 January 1863 – 26 March 1945), married morganatically without issue.; Prince Frederick Charles of Hesse, King-elect of Finland (1 May 1868 – 28 May 1940), married with issue.; Princess Marie-Polyxene of Hesse (29 April 1872 – 16 August 1882), died in childhood.; Princess Sybille Marguerite of Hesse (3 June 1877 – 11 February 1952), married.

=== Children of Augusta of Saxe-Weimar-Eisenach, German Empress ===
Image	Name	Birth	Death	Family
	Frederick III, German Emperor	18 October 1831	15 June 1888	Married Victoria, Princess Royal in 1858 with issue.: Wilhelm II, German Emperor and King of Prussia, (27 January 1859 – 4 June 1941), married with issue.; Princess Charlotte of Prussia, Duchess of Saxe-Meinigen (24 July 1860 – 1 October 1919), married with issue.; Prince Henry of Prussia (14 August 1862 – 20 April 1929), married with issue.; Prince Sigismund of Prussia (15 September 1864 – 18 June 1866), died in infancy.; Princess Viktoria of Prussia (12 April 1866 – 13 November 1929), married without issue.; Prince Waldemar of Prussia (10 February 1868 – 27 March 1879), died in childhood.; Princess Sophia of Prussia, Queen of Greece (14 June 1870 – 13 January 1932), married with issue.; Princess Margaret of Prussia, Queen-elect of Finland (22 April 1872 – 22 January 1954), married with issue.
	Princess Louise of Prussia, Grand Duchess of Baden	3 December 1838	23 April 1923	Married Frederick I, Grand Duke of Baden in 1856 with issue.: Frederick II, Grand Duke of Baden (9 July 1857 – 9 August 1928), married without issue.; Princess Victoria of Baden, Queen of Sweden (7 August 1862 – 4 April 1930), married with issue.; Prince Ludwig of Baden (12 June 1865 – 23 February 1888), died unmarried and without issue.

=== Children of Charles Alexander, Grand Duke of Saxe-Weimar-Eisenach and Princess Sophie of the Netherlands ===
Image	Name	Birth	Death	Family
	Charles Augustus, Hereditary Grand Duke of Saxe-Weimar-Eisenach	31 July 1844	20 November 1894	Married Princess Pauline of Saxe-Weimar-Eisenach in 1873 with issue.: William Ernest, Grand Duke of Saxe-Weimar-Eisenach (10 June 1876 – 24 April 1923), married with issue.; Prince Bernhard of Saxe-Weimar-Eisenach (18 April 1878 – 1 October 1900), died unmarried and without issue.
	Princess Marie Alexandrine of Saxe-Weimar-Eisenach	20 January 1849	6 May 1922	Married Heinrich VII, Prince Reuss of Köstritz in 1876 with issue.: Heinrich XXXII, Prince Reuss of Köstritz (4 March 1878 – 6 May 1935), married without issue.; Heinrich XXXIII, Prince Reuss of Köstritz (26 July 1879 – 15 November 1942), married with issue.; Princess Johanna Reuss of Köstritz (1882–1883), died in infancy.; Princess Sophie Renate Reuss of Köstritz (1884–1968), married.; Prince Heinrich XXXV Reuss of Köstritz (1887–1936), married with issue.
	Princess Anna of Saxe-Weimar-Eisenach	29 March 1851	26 April 1859	Died in childhood.
	Princess Elisabeth of Saxe-Weimar-Eisenach	28 February 1854	10 July 1908	Married Duke John Albert of Mecklenburg in 1886 without issue.

=== Children of Duke Peter of Oldenburg ===
Image	Name	Birth	Death	Family
	Alexandra of Oldenburg, Grand Duchess of Russia	2 June 1838	25 April 1900	Married Grand Duke Nicholas Nikolaevich of Russia in 1856 with issue. (see below)
	Nicholas of Oldenburg	9 May 1840	20 January 1886	Married morganatically Maria Ilyinichna Bulatsel in 1863 with issue.: Alexandra Nikolaevna von Osternburg (7 June 1864 – 23 July 1952), married with issue.; Pyotr Nikolaevich von Osternburg (7 May 1866 – 6 January 1868), died in infancy.; Olga Nikolaevna von Osternburg (13 May 1868 – 26 September 1869), died in infancy.; Vera Nikolaevna von Osternburg (4 June 1871 – 5 December 1888) died young.
	Cecile of Oldenburg	27 February 1842	11 January 1843	Died in infancy.
	Duke Alexander of Oldenburg	2 June 1844	6 September 1932	Married Princess Eugenia Maximilianovna of Leuchtenberg in 1868 with issue.: Duke Peter Alexandrovich of Oldenburg (21 November 1868 – 11 March 1924), married without issue.
	Catherine of Oldenburg	21 September 1846	23 June 1866	Died young.
	George of Oldenburg	17 April 1848	17 March 1871	Died young.
	Duke Constantine of Oldenburg	9 May 1850	18 March 1906	Married morganatically Agrippina Japaridze in 1882 with issue.: Countess Alexandra von Zarnekau (10 May [O.S. 28 April] 1883 – 28 May 1957), married with issue.; Countess Ekaterina von Zarnekau (16 September 1884 – 24 December 1963); Count Nikolai von Zarnekau (7 May 1886 – 1976), married.; Count Alexei von Zarnekau (16 July 1887 – 16 September 1918); Count Petr von Zarnekau (26 May 1889 – 1 November 1961); Count Nina von Zarnekau (13 August 1892 – 1922)
	Duchess Therese of Oldenburg	30 March 1852	19 April 1883	Married George Maximilianovich, 6th Duke of Leuchtenberg in 1879 with issue.: Alexander Georgievich, 7th Duke of Leuchtenberg (13 November 1881 – 26 September 1942), married without children.

=== Children of William III of the Netherlands and Princess Sophie of Württemberg ===
Image	Name	Birth	Death	Family
	William, Prince of Orange	4 September 1840	11 June 1879	Died unmarried and without issue.
	Prince Maurice of the Netherlands	15 September 1843	4 June 1850	Died in childhood.
	Alexander, Prince of Orange	25 August 1851	21 June 1884	Died unmarried and without issue.

By his second wife, Emma of Waldeck and Pyrmont, he had a daughter.

Image	Name	Birth	Death	Family
	Queen Wilhelmina of the Netherlands	31 August 1880	28 November 1962	Married Duke Henry of Mecklenburg-Schwerin in 1901 with issue.: Queen Juliana of the Netherlands (30 April 1909 – 20 March 2004), married with issue.

=== Children of Alexander II ===
Image	Name	Birth	Death	Family
	Grand Duchess Alexandra Alexandrovna	30 August 1842	10 July 1849	Died in childhood.
	Nicholas Alexandrovich, Tsesarevich of Russia	20 September 1843	24 April 1865	Died unmarried and without issue.
	Alexander III of Russia	10 March 1845	1 November 1894	Married Princess Dagmar of Denmark in 1866 with issue.: Nicholas II of Russia (18 May 1868 – 17 July 1918), married with issue.; Grand Duke Alexander Alexandrovich (7 June 1869 – 2 May 1870), died in infancy.; Grand Duke George Alexandrovich (9 May 1871 – 10 July 1899), died unmarried and without issue.; Grand Duchess Xenia Alexandrovna (6 April 1875 – 20 April 1960), married with issue.; Grand Duke Michael Alexandrovich 4 December 1878 – 13 June 1918), married morganatically with issue.; Grand Duchess Olga Alexandrovna (13 June 1882 – 24 November 1960), married with issue.
	Grand Duke Vladimir Alexandrovich	22 April 1847	17 February 1909	Married Duchess Marie of Mecklenburg-Schwerin in 1874 with issue.: Grand Duke Alexander Vladimirovich (31 August 1875 – 16 March 1877), died in infancy.; Grand Duke Kirill Vladimirovich (12 October 1876 – 12 October 1938), married with issue.; Grand Duke Boris Vladimirovich (24 November 1877 – 9 November 1943), married morganatically with issue.; Grand Duke Andrei Vladimirovich (14 May 1879 – 30 October 1956), married with issue.; Grand Duchess Elena Vladimirovna, Princess Nicholas of Greece and Denmark (29 January 1882 – 13 March 1957), married with issue.
	Grand Duke Alexei Alexandrovich	14 January 1850	14 November 1908	Married morganatically Alexandra Zhukovskaya with issue.: Aleksey Belevsky-Zhukovsky (26 November 1871 – c. 1931), married with issue.
	Grand Duchess Maria Alexandrovna, Duchess of Edinburgh and Saxe-Coburg and Gotha	17 October 1853	22 October 1920	Married Alfred, Duke of Saxe-Coburg and Gotha in 1874 with issue.: Alfred, Hereditary Prince of Saxe-Coburg and Gotha (15 October 1874 – 6 February 1899), died unmarried and without issue.; Princess Marie of Saxe-Coburg and Gotha, Queen of Romania (29 October 1875 – 18 July 1938), married with issue.; Princess Victoria Melita of Saxe-Coburg and Gotha, Grand Duchess of Hesse and by Rhine (25 November 1876 – 2 March 1936), married with issue.; Princess Alexandra of Saxe-Coburg and Gotha, Princess of Hohenlohe-Langenburg (1 September 1878 – 16 April 1942), married with issue.; Princess Beatrice of Saxe-Coburg and Gotha, Duchess of Galliera (20 April 1884 – 13 July 1966), married with issue.
	Grand Duke Sergei Alexandrovich	11 May 1857	17 February 1905	Married Princess Elisabeth of Hesse and by Rhine in 1884 without issue. They fostered their nephew Grand Duke Dmitri Pavlovich and niece Grand Duchess Maria Pavlovna, whose father was in exile.
	Grand Duke Paul Alexandrovich	3 October 1860	28 January 1919	Married Princess Alexandra of Greece and Denmark in 1889 with issue.: Grand Duke Dmitri Pavlovich (18 September 1891 – 5 March 1942), married with issue.; Grand Duchess Maria Pavlovna, Duchess of Södermanland (18 April 1890 – 13 December 1958), married with issue.; Married morganatically Princess Olga Paley in 1902 with issue.: Prince Vladimir Paley (9 January 1897 – 18 July 1918), died young.; Princess Irina Paley (21 December 1903 – 15 November 1990), married with issue.; Princess Natalia Paley (5 December 1905 – 27 December 1981), married without issue.
	Prince George Yuryevsky	12 May 1872	13 September 1913	Married Countess Alexandra von Zarnekau in 1900 with issue.: Prince Alexander Yuryevsky (21 December 1900 – 29 February 1988), married with issue.
	Princess Olga Yurievskaya	7 November 1873	10 August 1925	Married Count George-Nicholas von Merenberg in 1895 with issue.: Count Alexander Adolf (1896 – 1897), died in infancy.; Count George Michael (1897 – 1965), married with issue.; Countess Olga Ekaterina Adda (1898 – 1983), married with issue.
	Prince Boris Alexandrovich Yurievsky	23 February 1876	11 April 1876	Died in infancy.
	Princess Catherine Yurievskaya	9 September 1878	22 December 1959	Married Prince Alexander Baryatinsky in 1901 with issue.: Prince Andrei Baryatinsky (2 August 1902 – 1931); Prince Alexander Baryatinsky (24 March 1905 – 1992); Married Prince Sergei Obolensky in 1916 without issue.

=== Children of Grand Duchess Maria Nikolaevna of Russia, Duchess of Leuchtenberg ===
Image	Name	Birth	Death	Family
	Princess Alexandra of Leuchtenberg	9 April 1840	12 August 1843	Died in childhood.
	Princess Maria of Leuchtenberg, Princess Wilhelm of Baden	16 October 1841	16 February 1914	Married Prince William of Baden in 1863 with issue.: Princess Marie of Baden, Duchess of Anhalt (26 July 1865 – 29 November 1939), married without issue.; Prince Maximilian of Baden (10 July 1867 – 6 November 1929), married with issue.
	Nicholas, 4th Duke of Leuchtenberg	4 August 1843	6 January 1891	Married morganatically Nadezhda Annenkova in secret in 1868. They married officially in 1878, legitimising their issue.: Nicholas Nikolaevich (17 October 1868 - 1928), married with issue.; Georgy Nikolaevich (10 December 1872 – 1929), married with issue.
	Princess Eugenia of Leuchtenberg, Duchess of Oldenburg	1 April 1845	4 May 1925	Married Duke Alexander of Oldenburg in 1868 with issue (see above).
	Eugen, 5th Duke of Leuchtenberg	8 February 1847	31 August 1901	Married Daria Konstantinova Opochinina, Countess of Beauharnais in 1869 with issue.: Daria, Countess de Beauharnais (19 March 1870 – 4 November 1937), married with issue.; Prince Eugéne Kotchoubey de Beauharnais (24 July 1894 – 6 November 1951); Married Zinaida Dmitrievna Skobeleva in 1878 without issue. She was a cousin of his first wife.
	Prince Sergei of Leuchtenberg	20 December 1849	24 October 1877	Died unmarried and without issue.
	George, 6th Duke of Leuchtenberg	29 February 1852	16 May 1912	Married Duchess Therese Petrovna of Oldenburg in 1879 with issue (see above). Married Princess Anastasia of Montenegro in 1889 with issue.: Sergei Georgievich, 8th Duke of Leuchtenberg (4 July 1890 – 7 January 1974), died unmarried and without issue.; Princess Elena Georgievna of Leuchtenberg (3 January 1892 – 6 February 1971), married with issue.

With her second husband;

Image	Name	Birth	Death	Family
	Grigori Grigorievich, Count Stroganov	9 May 1857	26 February 1859	Died in childhood.
	Countess Elena Grigorievna Stroganova	11 February 1861	12 February 1908	Married Vladimir Alexeievich Sheremetev. Married Grigori Nikitich Milashevich.

=== Children of Grand Duke Konstantin Nikolaevich ===
Image	Name	Birth	Death	Family
	Grand Duke Nicholas Konstantinovich	14 February 1850	26 January 1918	Married Nadezhda Alexandrovna Dreyer in 1882 with issue.: Artemy Nikolayevich Prince Iskander (1883 – 1919), died unmarried and without issue.; Alexander Nikolayevich Prince Iskander (15 November 1887 – 26 January 1957), married with issue.
	Olga Constantinovna, Queen of Greece	3 September 1851	18 June 1926	Married George I of Greece in 1867 with issue.: Constantine I of Greece (2 August 1868 – 11 January 1923), married with issue.; Prince George of Greece and Denmark (24 June 1869 – 25 November 1957), married with issue.; Princess Alexandra of Greece and Denmark, Grand Duchess of Russia (30 August 1870 – 24 September 1891), married with issue (see above).; Prince Nicholas of Greece and Denmark (22 January 1872 – 8 February 1938), married with issue.; Princess Maria of Greece and Denmark, Grand Duchess of Russia, (3 March 1876 – 14 December 1940), married with issue.; Princess Olga of Greece and Denmark (7 April 1880 – 2 November 1880), died in infancy.; Prince Andrew of Greece and Denmark (2 February 1882 – 3 December 1944), married with issue.; Prince Christopher of Greece and Denmark (10 August 1888 – 21 January 1940), married with issue.
	Grand Duchess Vera Konstantinovna of Russia, Duchess of Württemberg	16 February 1854	11 April 1912	Married Duke Eugen of Württemberg in 1874 with issue.: Charles-Eugen of Württemberg (8 April 1875 – 11 November 1875), died in infancy.; Duchess Elsa of Württemberg (1 March 1876 – 27 May 1936), married with issue.; Duchess Olga of Württemberg (1 March 1876 – 21 October 1932), married with issue.
	Grand Duke Konstantin Konstantinovich	22 August 1858	15 June 1915	Married Princess Elisabeth of Saxe-Altenburg (see above) in 1884 with issue.: Prince John Konstantinovich (5 July 1886 – 18 July 1918), married with issue.; Prince Gabriel Konstantinovich (15 July 1887 – 28 February 1955), married without issue.; Princess Tatiana Konstantinovna (23 January 1890 – 28 August 1979), married with issue.; Prince Constantine Konstantinovich (1 January 1891 – 18 July 1918), died unmarried and without issue.; Prince Oleg Konstantinovich (27 November 1892 – 12 October 1914), died unmarried and without issue.; Prince Igor Konstantinovich (10 June 1894 – 18 July 1918), died unmarried and without issue.; Prince George Konstantinovich (6 May 1903 – 7 November 1938), died unmarried and without issue.; Princess Natalia Konstantinovna (1905 – 1905); Princess Vera Konstantinovna (24 April 1906 – 11 January 2001), died unmarried and without issue.
	Grand Duke Dmitry Konstantinovich	13 June 1860	28 January 1919	Died unmarried and without issue.
	Grand Duke Vyacheslav Konstantinovich	13 July 1862	27 February 1879	Died young.

=== Children of Grand Duke Nicholas Nikolaevich and Duchess Alexandra of Oldenburg ===
Image	Name	Birth	Death	Family
	Grand Duke Nicholas Nikolaevich	18 November 1856	5 January 1929	Married Princess Anastasia of Montenegro (sister of his brother's wife) in 1907 without issue.
	Grand Duke Peter Nikolaevich	22 January 1864	17 June 1931	Married Princess Milica of Montenegro in 1889 with issue.: Princess Marina Petrovna of Russia (11 March 1892 – 15 May 1981), married without issue.; Prince Roman Petrovich of Russia (17 October 1896 – 23 October 1978), married with issue.; Princess Nadezhda Petrovna of Russia (3 March 1898 – 21 April 1988), married with issue.; Princess Sofia Petrovna of Russia (3 March 1898 – 3 March 1898), died in infancy.

=== Children of Grand Duke Michael Nikolaevich ===
Image	Name	Birth	Death	Family
	Grand Duke Nicholas Mikhailovich	26 April 1859	28 January 1919	Died unmarried without issue.
	Grand Duchess Anastasia Mikhailovna	28 July 1860	11 March 1922	Married Frederick Francis III in 1879 with issue.: Duchess Alexandrine of Mecklenburg-Schwerin, Queen of Denmark (24 December 1879 – 28 December 1952), married with issue.; Frederick Francis IV, Grand Duke of Mecklenburg-Schwerin (9 April 1882 – 17 November 1945), married with issue.; Duchess Cecilie of Mecklenburg-Schwerin, Crown Princess of Germany (20 September 1886 – 6 May 1954), married with issue.; She also had an illegitimate child with Vladimir Alexandrovich Paltov.: Alexis Louis de Wenden (23 December 1902 – 7 July 1976), married with issue.
	Grand Duke Michael Mikhailovich	16 October 1861	26 April 1929	Married Countess Sophie of Merenberg in 1891 with issue.: Anastasia de Torby (9 September 1892 – 7 December 1977), married with issue.; Nadejda de Torby, Marchioness of Milford Haven (28 March 1896 – 22 January 1963), married with issue.; Michael Mikhailovich of Torby (8 October 1898 – 8 May 1959)
	Grand Duke George Mikhailovich	23 August 1863	28 January 1919	Married Princess Maria of Greece and Denmark (see above) in 1900 with issue.: Princess Nina Georgievna of Russia (20 June 1901 – 27 February 1974), married with issue.; Princess Xenia Georgievna of Russia (22 August 1903 – 17 September 1965), married with issue.
	Grand Duke Alexander Mikhailovich	13 April 1866	26 February 1933	Married Grand Duchess Xenia Alexandrovna of Russia (see above) in 1894 with issue.: Princess Irina Alexandrovna of Russia (15 July 1895 – 26 February 1970), married with issue.; Prince Andrei Alexandrovich of Russia (24 January 1897 – 8 May 1981), married with issue.; Prince Feodor Alexandrovich of Russia (23 December 1898 – 30 November 1968), married with issue.; Prince Nikita Alexandrovich of Russia (16 January 1900 – 12 September 1974), married with issue.; Prince Dmitri Alexandrovich of Russia (15 August 1901 – 7 July 1980), married with issue.; Prince Rostislav Alexandrovich of Russia (24 November 1902 – 31 July 1978), married with issue.; Prince Vasili Alexandrovich of Russia (6 July 1907 – 23 June 1989), married with issue.
	Grand Duke Sergei Mikhailovich	7 October 1869	18 July 1918	Died unmarried and without issue.
	Grand Duke Alexei Mikhailovich	28 December 1875	2 March 1895	Died unmarried and without issue.

=== Children of Grand Duchess Catherine Mikhailovna, Duchess Georg August of Mecklenburg-Strelitz ===
Image	Name	Birth	Death	Family
	Duke Nikolaus of Mecklenburg-Strelitz	11 July 1854	11 July 1854	Died soon after birth.
	Duchess Helene of Mecklenburg-Strelitz, Princess of Saxe-Altenburg	16 January 1857	28 August 1936	Married Prince Albert of Saxe-Altenburg in 1891 without issue.
	Duke Georg Alexander of Mecklenburg-Strelitz	6 June 1859	5 December 1909	Married morganatically Natalia Feodorovna Vanljarskya with issue.: Countess Catherine von Carlow (25 July 1891 – 9 October 1940), married with issue.; Countess Maria von Carlow (31 October 1893 – 5 September 1979), married.; Countess Natalia von Carlow ( 20 November 1894 – 4 December 1913), died young.; George, Duke of Mecklenburg (5 Oct 1899 – 6 Jul 1963), married with issue.
	Duchess Maria-Frederica of Mecklenburg-Strelitz	3 June 1861	16 December 1861	Died in infancy.
	Charles Michael, Duke of Mecklenburg	17 June 1863	6 December 1934	Died unmarried without issue.

== See also ==
- Descendants of Christian IX of Denmark – Describes progeny of a European king whose descendants married into multiple royal families
