= Meriel Buchanan =

British memorialist (1886–1959)

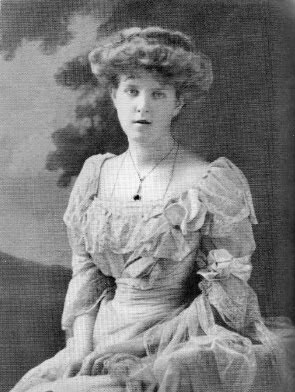
- Buchanan in 1903
- Born: Meriel Buchanan; 5 September 1886
- Died: 6 February 1959 (aged 72)
- Occupation: Writer
- Writing career
- Notable work: Ambassador's daughter

Meriel Buchanan (5 September 1886 – 6 February 1959) was a British memorialist. The daughter of the last British Ambassador to Imperial Russia, she wrote a number of articles and books about her experiences during that time, most notably: Recollections of imperial Russia (1923) and Ambassador's daughter (1958).

== Life ==
Meriel Buchanan was the only child of Sir George Buchanan (1854–1924), and his wife Lady Georgina Meriel Bathurst (1863–1922). As her father was a career diplomat, Meriel's early life was spent in the many countries where her father was posted: Hesse, Baden, Bulgaria, Germany, Italy, the Netherlands and Luxembourg. In 1910 the Buchanan family moved to Saint Petersburg, when Sir George Buchanan was appointed as the British ambassador to Russia.

In her early twenties at her arrival in Russia in 1910, she had a prominent position as the daughter of the British ambassador at the court of Tsar Nicholas II of Russia. This allowed her to meet many important figures at the Imperial Court. She was particularly close to Grand Duchess Victoria Feodorovna of Russia who took her under her wing. Meriel was popular in social circles and carried out a flirtation with Duke Alexander Georgievich of Leuchtenberg, a great grandson of Tsar Nicholas I and a distant cousin of Tsar Nikolai II. Duke Alexander, was the son of George Maximilianovich, 6th Duke of Leuchtenberg, and Duchess Therese Petrovna of Oldenburg. Both sets of parents were opposed to their romance. The Duke of Leuchtenberg refused his permission because Meriel, although daughter of a distinguished ambassador and possessing royal blood herself, was not considered the social equal of Alexander and did not have a sizable fortune. Meriel’s parents realized the impossibility of the situation and were fearful of a diplomatic scandal. Meriel’s mother, in particular, forbade her daughter to associate with the young duke. Eventually, Alexander did not take their romance seriously.

Meriel Buchanan had literary ambitions and published two novels based on her experiences living in Eastern Europe: White Witch (1913) and Tania. A Russian story (1914). During World War I, Meriel and her family remained in Russia. Her mother took charge of the organization of a hospital where Meriel worked as a nurse. Her father remained as the British ambassador even after the fall of the Romanovs. The family left Russia in January 1918 when her father became unwell.

Meriel's two novels, published before the war, were not a success. She then turned to non-fiction, writing a number of books about the Romanov family, the Russian nobility and her experiences living in Russia during the last years of the reign of Tsar Nicholas II, beginning with Petrograd, the city of trouble, 1914-1918, published in 1918.

She married in 1925 Major Harold Wilfred Knowling of the Welsh Guards (d. 1954), and had one son: Michael George Alexander Knowling (b. 1929). In 1958, the year before her death, she published an account of her father's diplomatic career under the title Ambassador's Daughter.

== Books ==
- White Witch (London: Herbert Jenkins, 1913)
- Tania. A Russian story (London: Herbert Jenkins, 1914)
- Petrograd, the city of trouble, 1914-1918 (London: W. Collins, 1918)
- Recollections of imperial Russia (London: Hutchinson & Co., 1923)
- Diplomacy and foreign courts (London, Hutchinson, 1928)
- The dissolution of an empire (London: John Murray, 1932; reprinted New York: Arno Press, 1971)
- Anne of Austria: The Infanta Queen (London: Hutchinson & Co., 1937)
- The Great Mademoiselle (London: Hutchinson & Co., 1938)
- Queen Victoria's relations (London: Cassell, 1954)
- Good Food from the Balkans (London: Frederick Muller Limited, 1956)
- Victorian gallery (London: Cassell, 1956)
- Ambassador's daughter (London: Cassell, 1958)

== Bibliography ==
- Cross, Anthony . In the Lands of the Romanovs : An Annotated Bibliography of First-Hand English-Language Accounts of the Russian Empire (1613-1917) . Open Book Publishers, 2014 . ISBN 978-1783740574.
- Firkatian, Mari A. Diplomats and Dreamers: The Stancioff Family in Bulgarian History. UPA, 2008. ISBN 978-0761840695
- McCarthy, Helen. Women of the World: The Rise of the Female Diplomat. Bloomsbury Publishing PLC; 2014. ISBN 978-1408840054
- Rappaport, Helen (2016). Caught in the Revolution (Paperback). London: Windmill Books. ISBN 9780099592426.
- Sullivan, Michael John. A Fatal Passion: The Story of the Uncrowned Last Empress of Russia, Random House, 1997, ISBN 0-679-42400-8
- Van der Kiste, John. Princess Victoria Melita .Sutton Publishing, 1991. ISBN 0-7509-3469-7
