= Duke of Santa Cruz =

Coat of Arms of Auguste de Beauharnais, Duke of Santa Cruz.

Duke of Santa Cruz was a title of nobility of the Empire of Brazil created by Emperor Pedro I of Brazil, dated from 5 November 1829, for his brother-in-law, Prince Auguste de Beauharnais, brother of Pedro's second wife Empress Amélie.

Five years later, in December 1834, Auguste became (the late) Pedro I's son-in-law, when he was chosen to marry the Emperor's eldest daughter, Queen Maria II of Portugal.

The toponym associated to this title concerns Santa Cruz, today a neighborhood in Rio de Janeiro.

== List of dukes ==
- Auguste de Beauharnais (1810–1835), also 2nd Duke of Leuchtenberg, 2nd Prince of Eichstätt, and Prince consort of Portugal (1834–1835).
