= Nicolas de Leuchtenberg =

Claimant to the Dukedom of Leuchtenberg (born 1933)

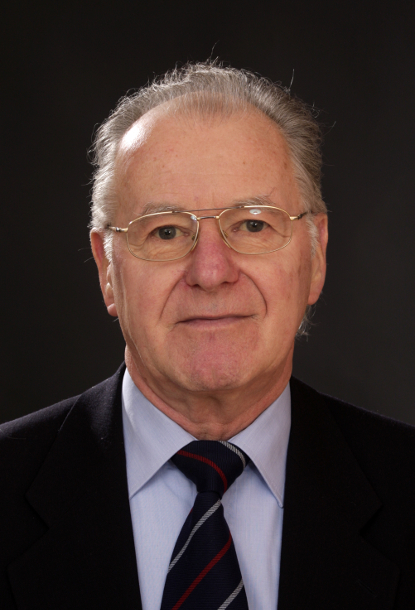
- Full name: Nikolaus Alexander Fritz de Beauharnais, Duke of Leuchtenberg
- Born: 12 October 1933 (age 92); Munich, Bavaria, Germany
- Noble family: Beauharnais
- Spouse: Anne Christine Bügge (m. 1962; div. 1985)
- Issue: Nikolaus Maximilian de Beauharnais, Duke of Leuchtenberg; Konstantin Alexander Peter de Beauharnais, Duke of Leuchtenberg
- Father: Nikolai Nikolaievich, Duke of Leuchtenberg
- Mother: Elisabeth Müller-Himmler

Nicolas de Beauharnais (Nikolaus Alexander Fritz de Beauharnais, Herzog von Leuchtenberg; born 12 October 1933, Munich) is a titular Duke of Leuchtenberg and the head of the historic noble House of Beauharnais.

== Family ==
He is the son of Nikolai Nikolaievich de Beauharnais, Duke of Leuchtenberg (in the Russian nobility) (Gori or Novgorod, Russia, 27/29 July (Old Style) 8/10 August (New Style) 1896 – Munich, Bavaria, Germany, 5 May 1937).

== Marriage and issue ==
On 24 August 1962, he married Anne Christine Bügge (born Stettin, Pomerania, Prussia, Germany, 17 December 1936) in Obernkirchen, Lower Saxony, West Germany], on 24 August 1962 and divorced in 1985, daughter of Gustav Bügge and wife Dorothea Arnold, with whom he had two sons:

- Nikolaus Maximilian de Beauharnais, Duke of Leuchtenberg (Bonn, North Rhine-Westphalia, West Germany, 20 January 1963 – Sankt Augustin, Bonn, North Rhine-Westphalia, Germany, 8 December 2002), died unmarried and without issue;
- Konstantin Alexander Peter de Beauharnais, Duke of Leuchtenberg (born Bonn, North Rhine-Westphalia, West Germany, 25 June 1965), heir apparent to his father, unmarried and without issue.

== Biography ==
Born in 1933, Nicolas lives in Sankt Augustin, near Bonn. He has a long career as an audio engineer in German television.

After the death without issue of Sergei Georgievich, 8th Duke of Leuchtenberg, (1890–1974), last holder of the Bavarian title, and that of his eldest son, Nicolas Maximilien (d. 2002), he and his second son Constantin are the last male representatives of the family and of the Russian ducal title.

From 2010s onwards, Nicolas has participated in several commemorations of the installation of his family in the Kingdom of Bavaria in 1814. In 2013, he celebrated his 80th birthday at Eichstätt, the capital of the principality of his ancestors.

Nicolas de Leuchtenberg House of Beauharnais Born: 12 October 1933
Titles in pretence
Preceded by Sergei Georgievich	— TITULAR — Duke of Leuchtenberg (nominal in Russia; see Heirs since 1974); 1974–present	Incumbent; Heir: Constantin
Preceded by Sergei Georgievich	— TITULAR — Grand Duke of Frankfurt; 1974–present Reason for succession failure: Grand Duchy abolished in 1813	Incumbent; Heir: Constantin
