= Duke of Leuchtenberg =

Noble title

Arms of Eugène de Beauharnais as Duke of Leuchtenberg

Duke of Leuchtenberg was a title created twice by the monarchs of Bavaria for their relatives. The first creation was awarded by Maximilian I, Elector of Bavaria to his son Maximilian Philipp Hieronymus, upon whose death without children the lands passed back to his nephew Elector Maximilian II. It was re-created by Maximilian I Joseph, King of Bavaria on 14 November 1817 and awarded to his son-in-law, Eugène de Beauharnais, styled Royal Highness by personal grant, and with the style Serene Highness for his agnatic descendants. Eugène was the adopted stepson of the deposed Emperor Napoleon I of France, and had previously held the title of French prince (Prince français) with the style Imperial Highness. He also had been the emperor's heir in Frankfurt and briefly in Italy. King Maximilian Joseph compensated his son-in-law after he lost his other titles and named him heir to the kingdom after the male-line descendants of the royal house and next in precedence after the Royal Family.

The subsidiary title, also in the Bavarian peerage, was Prince of Eichstätt, but its attached territory was sold off by the 4th Duke to the King of Bavaria in 1855. On 14 July 1839, Emperor Nicholas I of Russia granted the Russian and Finnish style Imperial Highness, alongside the subsidiary title Prince Romanovsky, to the 3rd Duke, Maximilian, who had just married his daughter, Grand Duchess Maria Nikolaevna.

Nicholas Maximilianovich, 4th Duke of Leuchtenberg, was created Duke of Leuchtenberg in the Russian Empire in 1890 by Alexander III of Russia, as the ducal family was by then composed of members of the extended Russian Imperial Family. This creation once again confirmed the elevation of the style from Serene to Imperial Highness, and was to be carried by all male line descendants of Nicholas born of marriages of the corresponding rank, of the incumbent Duke from 1852 to 1891. The title was largely ceremonial, with no lands or governance attached; the style and title became "Duke von (or of) Leuchtenberg, de Beauharnais".

Following the death of the 8th Duke in 1974, no remaining heirs of full dynastic status remained; the 8th Duke's parents' marriage was the last equal marriage entered into by a male dynast of the House of Beauharnais. The title is claimed by Nicolas de Leuchtenberg (born 1933), senior heir of the 4th Duke by a morganatic marriage, whose grandfather Nicolas Nikolaievitch (1868–1928) was titled Duke of Leuchtenberg in 1890 by edict of Tsar Alexander III of Russia, with the style Highness.

== Duke of Leuchtenberg, 1650 to 1705 ==
Duke	Portrait	Birth	Marriage(s)	Death
Maximilian Philipp Hieronymus; 1650–1705		30 September 1638; Munich, Bavaria son of Maximilian I, Elector of Bavaria and Archduchess Maria Anna of Austria	Maurita Febronia de la Tour d'Auvergne; 1668 no children	20 March 1705; Turkheim, Bavaria aged 66

== Dukes of Leuchtenberg, 1817 to 1974 ==
Duke	Portrait	Birth	Marriage(s)	Death
Eugène de Beauharnais; 1817–1824 styled Royal Highness by personal grant, French Prince (1804), Viceroy of Italy (1805), Prince of Venice (1807), heir to the Grand Duchy of Frankfurt (1810)		3 September 1781; Paris, France son of Alexandre, Vicomte de Beauharnais and Joséphine Tascher de la Pagerie	Princess Augusta of Bavaria; 14 January 1806; 7 children	21 February 1824; Munich, Bavaria aged 42
Auguste de Beauharnais; 1824–1835 styled Serene Highness, created Imperial and Royal Highness by his father-in-law Duke of Santa Cruz (1829), Prince Consort of Portugal (1834)		9 December 1810; Milan, Lombardy, Italy son of Eugène de Beauharnais and Princess Augusta of Bavaria	Maria II, Queen of Portugal; 1 December 1834 no children	28 March 1835; Lisbon, Portugal aged 24
Maximilian de Beauharnais; 1835–1852 styled Serene Highness, granted the style Imperial Highness by his father-in-law		2 October 1817; Munich, Bavaria son of Eugène de Beauharnais and Princess Augusta of Bavaria	Grand Duchess Maria Nikolaevna of Russia; 2 July 1839; 7 children	1 November 1852; Saint Petersburg, Russia aged 35
Nicholas Maximilianovich de Beauharnais; 1852–1891 styled Imperial Highness		4 August 1843 son of Maximilian de Beauharnais and Grand Duchess Maria Nikolaevna of Russia	Nadezhda Sergeevna Annenkova (morganatic); October 1868; 2 sons	6 January 1891; Paris, France aged 47
Eugene Maximilianovich de Beauharnais; 1891–1901 styled Imperial Highness		8 February 1847; Saint Petersburg, Russia son of Maximilian de Beauharnais and Grand Duchess Maria Nikolaevna of Russia	Daria Opotchinina (morganatic); 20 January 1869; 1 daughter Zinaida Skobeleva (morganatic); 14 July 1878 no children	31 August 1901; Saint Petersburg, Russia aged 54
George Maximilianovich de Beauharnais; 1901–1912 styled Imperial Highness		29 February 1852; Saint Petersburg, Russia son of Maximilian de Beauharnais and Grand Duchess Maria Nikolaevna of Russia	Duchess Therese Petrovna of Oldenburg; 12 May 1879 one son Princess Anastasia of Montenegro; 16 April 1889; 2 children	16 May 1912; Paris, France aged 60 (15)
Alexander Georgievich de Beauharnais; 1912–1942 styled Imperial Highness; reverted to Serene Highness following abolition of Russian titles in 1918; title held in pretense after abolition of German monarchy in 1919		13 November 1881; Saint Petersburg, Russia son of George Maximilianovich and Duchess Therese Petrovna of Oldenburg	Nadezhda Nicolaevna Caralli (morganatic); 22 January 1917 no children	26 September 1942; Salies-de-Béarn, France aged 60
Sergei Georgievich de Beauharnais; 1942–1974 styled Serene Highness		4 July 1890; Peterhof, Russia son of George Maximilianovich and Princess Anastasia of Montenegro	never married	7 January 1974; Rome, Italy aged 83

== Dukes of Leuchtenberg, morganatic branch (1890–present) ==
Note: according to the present-day republican German law, the subsequent list is only an original research. Noble titles are no longer recognised. People of noble descent are able to change their name to append their title to act as part of their surname.

Portrait	Biographical elements	Complete title(s)	Marriage(s)	Tenure
Nicolas de Leuchtenberg	Nicolas Nikolaevich de Leuchtenberg; Born on 17 October 1868 in Geneva, Switzerland. Deceased on 2 March 1928 in Paris, France	granted the style Highness by Alexander III (1890–1928); Count of Beauharnais (1878–1928); Duke of Leuchtenberg (1890–1928); Marquis of La Ferté-Beauharnais (1891–1928)	Countess Maria Nikolaevna Grabbe (1869–1948) (daughter of Count Nicholas Pavlovich Grabbe)	Duke of Leuchtenberg; 11 November 1890 – 2 March 1928 (37 years, 3 months and 20 days) (cousin of Sergei Georgievich, son of Nicholas Maximilianovich)
	Nicolas Nikolaevich de Leuchtenberg; Born on 8 August 1896 in Gory, Russia. Deceased 5 May 1937 in Munich, Germany	styled Highness (1896–1937); Duke of Leuchtenberg (1896–1937); Count of Beauharnais (1896–1937); Marquis of La Ferté-Beauharnais (1928–1937)	Olga Nikolaevna Fomina (1898–1921) Elisabeth Müller-Himmler (1906–1999)	Duke of Leuchtenberg; 2 March 1928 – 5 May 1937 (9 years, 2 months and 3 days) (son of his predecessor)
Nicolas de Leuchtenberg	Nicolas de Leuchtenberg; Born on 12 October 1933 in Munich, Germany	styled Highness (1933); Duke of Leuchtenberg (1933); Count of Beauharnais (1933); Marquis of La Ferté-Beauharnais (1937)	Anne Christine Bügge (1936)	Duke of Leuchtenberg; 5 May 1937 – present (89 years, 4 months and 16 days) (son of his predecessor)

== Genealogy ==
- Eugène, married Princess Augusta of Bavaria, 7 children including:
  - Auguste, 2nd Duke, Duke of Santa Cruz, married Queen Maria II of Portugal, no issue
  - Maximilian, 3rd Duke, married Maria Nikolaevna of Russia, 7 children, including:
    - Maria, Princess Romanowskaya (1841–1941) married Prince William of Baden (1829–1897)
      - Prince Max of Baden
    - Nicholas Maximilianovich, 4th Duke of Leuchtenberg, prince Romanowsky (4 August 1843 in the dacha of Sergueïvskoïe – 6 January 1891, Paris), buried in a monastery near St Petersburg. On 5 July 1868, he married (morganatically) Nadezhda Sergeevna Annenkova (1840–1891), thereupon known as Countess of Beauharnais. They had two children:
      - Nicholas Nikolaevich de Leuchtenberg (17 October 1868, Geneva – 2 March 1928, Vaucluse, France), member of the White Army. He married Countess Maria Nikolaevna Grabbe (1869–1948) on 6 September 1894, and had 7 children, including:
        - Alexandra Nikolaevna de Leuchtenberg (1895–1960), princess Romanowskaya, in 1916 married Prince Levan Melikov (1893–1928) (divorced), in 1922 married Nicholas Tereshchenko (1894–1926).
        - Nicholas Nikolaevich de Leuchtenberg (1896, Gori, near Novgorod – 1937), married Olga Fomina (1898–1921), on 8 September 1919 at Novocherkassk and then (after her death) remarried on 3 November 1928 at Munich, to Elisabeth Müller-Himmler (1906–1999). He had two children by his second marriage:
          - Eugénie Élisabeth de Leuchtenberg (1929–2006), in 1958, she married Martin von Bruch (1911–)
          - Nicolas de Leuchtenberg, current claimant of the title, on 24 August 1962, he married Anne Bügge (1933–), and had two children:
            - Nicolas Maximilien de Leuchtenberg (1963–2002), died unmarried and without issue.
            - Constantin de Leuchtenberg (1965–), heir apparent to his father, unmarried and without issue.
        - Nadejda Nikolaevna de Leuchtenberg, (1898, Gori, near Novgorod – 1962, San Francisco), in 1929, she married Alexandre Yakovlevich Mogilevsky (1885, Odessa – 1953, Tokyo), and had one son:
          - Michael Alexandrovich de Beauharnais-Mogilevsky (1929–), married to Joan Russell (1931–), and had 3 children:
            - Michelle de Beauharnais Mogilevsky (1956–), first married to Douglas Mock (1955-) in 1977, then to Jeffre Harrison in 1980.
            - Anton de Beauharnais Mogilevsky (1960–) married Susan Katherine Westra in 1983 (divorced 1988). In 1995, he married Holly Jill Smith (1969–2014). In 2017 he married Victoria Mewborn Kerner (1961-).
            - André Jon de Beauharnais Mogilevsky (1962–) married to Kimberly Potter.
        - Maximilien Nikolaevich de Leuchtenberg (1900–1905).
        - Sergei Nikolaevich de Leuchtenberg (1903–1966), founder of the National Alliance of Russian Solidarists. In 1925, he married Anne Naumova (1900–?), (divorced in 1938, and had 4 daughters), in 1939 married Kira Wolkova (1915–), (divorced in 1942), and finally married Olga Wickberg (1926–), and had a son and a daughter. Altogether, he had six children by all his marriages:
          - Maria Magdalena de Leuchtenberg (1926–), married to Joseph de Pasquale (1919–2015), and had four children.
          - Anna de Leuchtenberg (1928–), married to Robert Stout (1931–) and had one son:
            - Eugene de Beauharnais Stout (1957–), married to Patricia Lynn Thompson (1959–), and had two children.
          - Olga de Leuchtenberg (1931–2007), married to Ronald Newburg (1926–), and had two children:
            - George Alexander de Beauharnais Newburg (1958–)
            - Stephanie Anne de Beauharnais Newburg (1960–)
          - Natalia de Leuchtenberg (1934–), married to Malcolm Baker Bowers (1933–), and had two children.
          - Sergei Sergeevich de Leuchtenberg (1955–)
          - Elizabeth Sergeevna de Leuchtenberg (1957–), married to John Craft (1954–), and had four children.
        - Michael Nikolaevich de Leuchtenberg (1905–1928), unmarried and without issue.
        - Maria Nikolaevna de Leuchtenberg (1907–1992), married to Nikolai Dmitrievich, Count von Mengden, Baron von Altenwoga (1899–1977).
      - George Nikolaevich de Leuchtenberg, (1872–1929), styled Duke of Leuchtenberg, prince Romanowsky; he is famous for having hosted Anna Anderson in 1927, at Castle Seeon. In 1895 he married Princess Olga Nikolaevna Repnina (1872–1953), and had 6 children:
        - Elena Georgievna de Leuchtenberg (1896–1977), married to Arkadii Konstantinovich Ugrichist-Trebinsky (1897–1982), and had one daughter.
        - Dmitri Georgievich de Leuchtenberg (1898–1972), married to Catherine Alexeievna Arapova (1900–1991) in 1921, and had 2 children:
          - Elena Dmitrievna de Leuchtenberg (1922, Munich –2013), unmarried and without issue.
          - George Dmitrievich de Leuchtenberg (1927, Munich –1963, Quebec), unmarried and without issue.
        - Natalia Georgievna de Leuchtenberg (1900–1995), married to Vladimir Feodorovich, Baron Meller-Sakomelsky (1894–1962).
        - Tamara Georgievna de Leuchtenberg (1901–?), married to Constantin Karanfilov (1905–1978), and had three daughters.
        - Andrei Georgievich de Leuchtenberg (1903, St. Petersburg –1919, Narva), unmarried and without issue.
        - Constantine Georgievich de Leuchtenberg (19 May 1905 in Russia–17 December 1983 in Ottawa, Canada), in 1929, he married Princess Daria Alexeievna Obolenskaya (1903–1982), and had 2 daughters:
          - Xenia Constantinovna de Leuchtenberg (1930–), married to Dmitri, Count Grabbe (1927–2011), and had seven children.
          - Olga Constantinovna de Leuchtenberg (1932–); on 15 March 1952 she married Oleg Gaydebouroff in Hempstead, Nassau County, New York. They had 2 children.
    - Eugenia Maximilianovna, Princess Romanowskaya (1845–1925) m. Duke Alexander Petrovich of Oldenburg (1844–1932)
      - Duke Peter Alexandrovich of Oldenburg, married Grand Duchess Olga Alexandrovna of Russia on 9 August 1901, without issue; marriage annulled in 1916 by Nicholas II.
    - Eugène Maximilianovich, 5th Duke of Leuchtenberg (1847–1901), married (1) Daria Opochinina (1845–1870), married (2) in 1878 Zinaida Skobeleva (1856–1899); both his wives were titled Countess of Beauharnais. He had one daughter from his first marriage:
      - Daria de Beauharnais (1870–1937), styled Countess of Beauharnais, married (1) Lev Mikhailovich, Prince Kochubey (1862–1927) in 1893, divorced in 1910; married (2) Vladimir, Baron von Graevenitz (1872–1916) in 1911; married (3) Victor Markezetti (1874–1938) in 1913. She had 2 children by her first marriage:
        - Eugène Lvovich, Prince Kochubey de Beauharnais (1894, Peterhof –1951), married to Helen Geraldine Pierce (1898–1980), and had four daughters.
        - Natalia Lvovna, Princess Kochubey de Beauharnais (1899–1979), unmarried and without issue.
    - Sergei Maximilianovich, Duke of Leuchtenberg (1849–1877), killed in the Russo-Turkish war.
    - George Maximilianovich, 6th Duke von Leuchtenberg (1852–1912), married (1) Duchess Therese Petrovna of Oldenburg (1852–1883) in 1879 at Stuttgart, and had one son, married (2) Princess Anastasia of Montenegro (1868–1935) in 1889 at Peterhof, and had one son and a daughter:
      - Alexander Georgievich, 7th Duke von Leuchtenberg (1881–1942), married morganatically Nadejda Caralli (1883–1964) on 22 April 1917 at St. Petersburg, without issue.
      - Sergei Georgievich, 8th Duke von Leuchtenberg (1890–1974), unmarried and without issue.
      - Elena Georgievena, Princess Romanowskaya (1892–1971), married Count Stefan Tyszkiewicz (1896–1976) in 1917 at Yalta, she had one daughter:
        - Natalia Rose Marie, Countess Tyszkiewicz (1921–2003), unmarried and without issue.
    - Alexandra Maximilanova, Princess Romanowskaya (1840–183), died young.

== Bibliography ==
- Bayern, Prinz Adalbert, Die Herzen der Leuchtenberg: Chronik einer napoleonisch-bayerisch-europäischen Familie. Munich, Neuausg, 1992, p. 384. ISBN 3-485-00665-3.
- Belyakova, Zoia. Honour and fidelity: the Russian Dukes of Leuchtenberg, Logos Publisher, 2010. ASIN B00C40ONY8.
- Belyakova, Zoia. Вернувшиеся из забвения, Genio Loci, 2012, p.125. ISBN 978-5-903903-10-8.
- Fanning, Charles W. Dukes of Leuchtenberg: A Genealogy of the Descendants of Eugene de Beauharnais, J.V. Poate, 1983, p. 106. ISBN 0-9500183-4-1.
- Jahn, Cornelia et al., Leuchtenberg: Zeit des Adels in Seeon und Stein, Kultur- und Bildungszentrum, Kloster Seeon, 2008, p. 80. ISBN 978-3-00-024283-0.
- Martignac, Gérald Gouyé & Sementéry, Michel. La descendance de Joséphine impératrice des Français, Paris, Christian, 1994, p. 225. ISBN 2-86496-058-3.
- Sakharov, Igor «Subjects of the French Kings → Bavarian Dukes → Members of the Russian Imperial House → Citizens of Germany, France, Canada, USA: The Beauharnais over the last 200 years», Genealogica & Heraldica, Ottawa, 1996, pp. 249-254.
