= Duke of Navarre =

Noble title in the First French Empire

Arms of the 1st Duchess of Navarre

Duke of Navarre (French: duc de Navarre) was a noble title of the First French Empire.

It was created, as Duchess of Navarre (French: duchesse de Navarre), by letters patent of 9 April 1810 for Empress Joséphine, following her divorce from Napoleon earlier that year. The title refers to her Château de Navarre in Normandy, so called because created for Queen Joan II of Navarre, Sovereign of the Kingdom of Navarre.

She died in 1814 and was succeeded by her grandsons, first Auguste (who died in 1835) and then Maximilian. Upon Maximilian's death in 1852, during the Second French Empire, his eldest son Nicholas was prevented from succeeding. Through his mother, Grand Duchess Maria Nikolaevna of Russia, he was a member of a foreign royal family and thus unable to take the required oath to establish succession to the majorat.

== Dukes of Navarre (1810-1852) ==
- Joséphine de Beauharnais, 1st Duchess of Navarre (1763–1814)
- Auguste de Beauharnais, 2nd Duke of Navarre (1810–1835)
- Maximilian de Beauharnais, 3rd Duke of Navarre (1817–1852)
