= Alexander Georgievich, 7th Duke of Leuchtenberg =

Duke of Leuchtenberg from 1912 to 1942

Alexander Georgievich
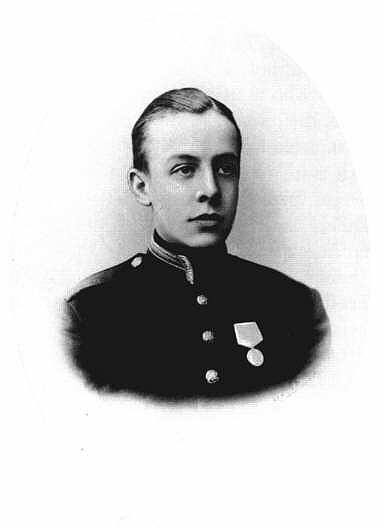
- A photograph of Alexander Georgievich, 7th Duke of Leuchtenberg in his youth.

Duke of Leuchtenberg
- Reign: 16 May 1912 – 26 September 1942
- Predecessor: George Maximilianovich, 6th Duke of Leuchtenberg
- Successor: Sergei Georgievich
- Born: 13 November 1881; Saint Petersburg, Russian Empire
- Died: 26 September 1942 (aged 60); Salies-de-Béarn, France
- Burial: Salies-de-Béarn, France
- Spouse: Nadezhda Caralli (m. 1917)
- House: Beauharnais
- Father: George Maximilianovich, 6th Duke of Leuchtenberg
- Mother: Duchess Therese Petrovna of Oldenburg

Alexander Georgievich, 7th Duke of Leuchtenberg (13 November 1881 – 26 September 1942), also known as Prince Alexander Georgievich Romanovsky or less commonly Alexander de Beauharnais, was the only son of George Maximilianovich, 6th Duke of Leuchtenberg by his first wife, Duchess Therese of Oldenburg. He was a descendant of Paul I of Russia through both of his parents.

== Family and early life ==
Alexander Georgievich ("Sandro") was born on 13 November 1881, as the only surviving child of George Maximilianovich, 6th Duke of Leuchtenberg, by his first wife, Duchess Therese Petrovna of Oldenburg. Like his father, (Note: George's father Maximilian de Beauharnais, 3rd Duke of Leuchtenberg had married into the Russian imperial family (with marriage to Grand Duchess Maria Nikolaevna of Russia) and adopted Russian titles and coats of arms.) Alexander was styled His Imperial Highness from birth. His mother died on 19 April 1883, leaving a widower and young son. His father would not remarry for six years, until he caught Princess Anastasia of Montenegro's eye at her sister Milica's wedding. They soon married and produced two children, Sergei and Elena.

== Military career ==
Alexander served as a sub-Lieutenant of the Hussars of the guard, and as an aide-de-camp to the Russian emperor. Later he became attached to the Fourth Battalion of the Chasseurs of the Guard of the Imperial Family.

== Marriage ==
In 1909, Alexander featured in many newspapers after rumors spread that he would enter into a morganatic marriage with American Marjorie Gould, a daughter of wealthy railroad executive George Jay Gould I. They reported Alexander met Marjorie the previous summer in Paris, and that his father later approached George Gould and asked for his daughter's hand for his son. One stated Alexander's father "would not sanction a marriage merely for love, and would insist that the Prince's bride must bring with her a fortune suitable to the rank of an Imperial Princess". George Gould and others put down these rumors vehemently, stating there the two were mere friends and there was no engagement.

In 1912, Alexander was reported to have gained the reluctant consent of Emperor Nicholas to marry the wealthy Marianne Friedländer-Fuld, but only on the condition that the union would be considered unequal, with none of his titles being passed onto his wife or possible children. Despite being the descendant and heir of the titles of Eugène de Beauharnais (son of Empress Joséphine), Alexander was far from rich, and served as a captain of the Russian Hussars of the guard and as an aide-de-camp to the Emperor. He was however the principal heir to his grandfather.

Alexander later morganatically married to Nadezhda (or Nadejda) Nicolaevna Caralli (14 July 1883 – 1964) on 22 January 1917 in Petrograd.

== Russian revolution ==
As he was closely related to the Russian imperial family, Alexander made several attempts to save Tsar Nicholas II and his family. Several days after Nicholas's abdication on 15 March 1917, Alexander visited Meriel Buchanan (Note: Alexander had known Muriel previously, as they had nearly embarked on a romantic relationship (Clark, p. 4).), the daughter of Sir George Buchanan, British ambassador to the Russian court, with the hopes of gaining her father's help. She noticed that the duke seem distracted and somehow different, "then I realized suddenly that he had discarded all his decorations, and no longer wore the golden aiguillettes. Russia had no Emperor now, I remembered". Alexander said he had come to urge her father, Sir George, to take swift action and get the tsar and his family out of Russia. He continued that the family was in "the gravest danger", and that if they did not leave soon, it would be too late to get them away and save them from possible disaster. Muriel subsequently called her father over, where he and Alexander discussed the situation; Sir George agreed to do all he could, but stated he had already sent several messages to London warning of the dangers.

In 1918, the year the family was murdered, Alexander traveled to Berlin and tried to get the help of Wilhelm II, German Emperor, who was a cousin of Nicholas's; in this attempt, the duke tried to persuade Nicholas to agree to a plan based on German help. Alexander was in favor of spiriting the family away to Berlin, but Nicholas refused, causing rumors that Wilhelm's government was considering "kidnapping the Tsar and his family and bringing them to Germany". Empress Alexandra insisted she "would rather die in Russia than be rescued by the Germans". In the end, nothing came of these plans, as monarchist groups could not decide whether or not to restore Nicholas or his son Tsarevich Alexei Nikolaevich.

Near the end of 1917, while lodging with Felix Yusupov (Note: Yusopov was the killer of Grigori Rasputin.), Alexander was arrested by Bolshevik authorities, along with four or five prominent members of the monarchical party. In 1919, a Bolshevik wireless message sent to The Washington Post asserted that after a meeting of Russian monarchists in Siberia, Alexander was offered and accepted the Russian throne, though no further reports confirmed this.

=== Death ===
Alexander died in exile on 26 September 1942 in Salies-de-Béarn, France. He was succeeded as Duke of Leuchtenberg by his younger half-brother Prince Sergei.

== Honours and arms ==
Coat of arms of the Dukes of Leuchtenberg

Russian

- Knight of St. Andrew, 1881
- Knight of St. Alexander Nevsky, 18 November 1901
- Knight of the White Eagle 18 November 1901
- Knight of St. Anna, 1st Class, 18 November 1901
- Knight of St. Stanislaus, 1st Class 18 November 1901
- Knight of St. Vladimir, 4th Class with Sword and Bow, 9 January 1915
- St. George Sword, 15 November 1915

Foreign

- France: Grand Cross of the Legion of Honour, 1912
- Kingdom of Italy: Knight of the Annunciation, 12 July 1913
- Kingdom of Montenegro: Grand Cross of the Order of Danilo I

== Ancestry ==
Ancestors of Alexander Georgievich, 7th Duke of Leuchtenberg

8. Eugène de Beauharnais, 1st Duke of Leuchtenberg
4. Maximilian de Beauharnais, 3rd Duke of Leuchtenberg
9. Princess Augusta of Bavaria
2. George Maximilianovich, 6th Duke of Leuchtenberg
10. Nicholas I of Russia
5. Grand Duchess Maria Nikolaevna of Russia
11. Princess Charlotte of Prussia
1. Alexander Georgievich, 7th Duke of Leuchtenberg
12. Duke George of Oldenburg
6. Duke Peter of Oldenburg
13. Grand Duchess Catherine Pavlovna of Russia
3. Duchess Therese Petrovna of Oldenburg
14. William, Duke of Nassau
7. Princess Therese of Nassau-Weilburg
15. Princess Louise of Saxe-Hildburghausen

== Notes ==
Alexander Georgievich, 7th Duke of Leuchtenberg House of Beauharnais Born: 13 November 1881 Died: 26 September 1942
German nobility
Preceded by George Maximilianovich	Duke of Leuchtenberg; 16 May 1912 – 11 August 1919	Succeeded by German nobility titles abolished
Titles in pretence
Loss of title	— TITULAR — Duke of Leuchtenberg; 11 August 1919 – 26 September 1942	Succeeded by Sergei Georgievich
