= Auguste, Duke of Leuchtenberg =

Prince consort of Portugal in 1835

Prince Auguste
- Duke of Navarre, Duke of Santa Cruz
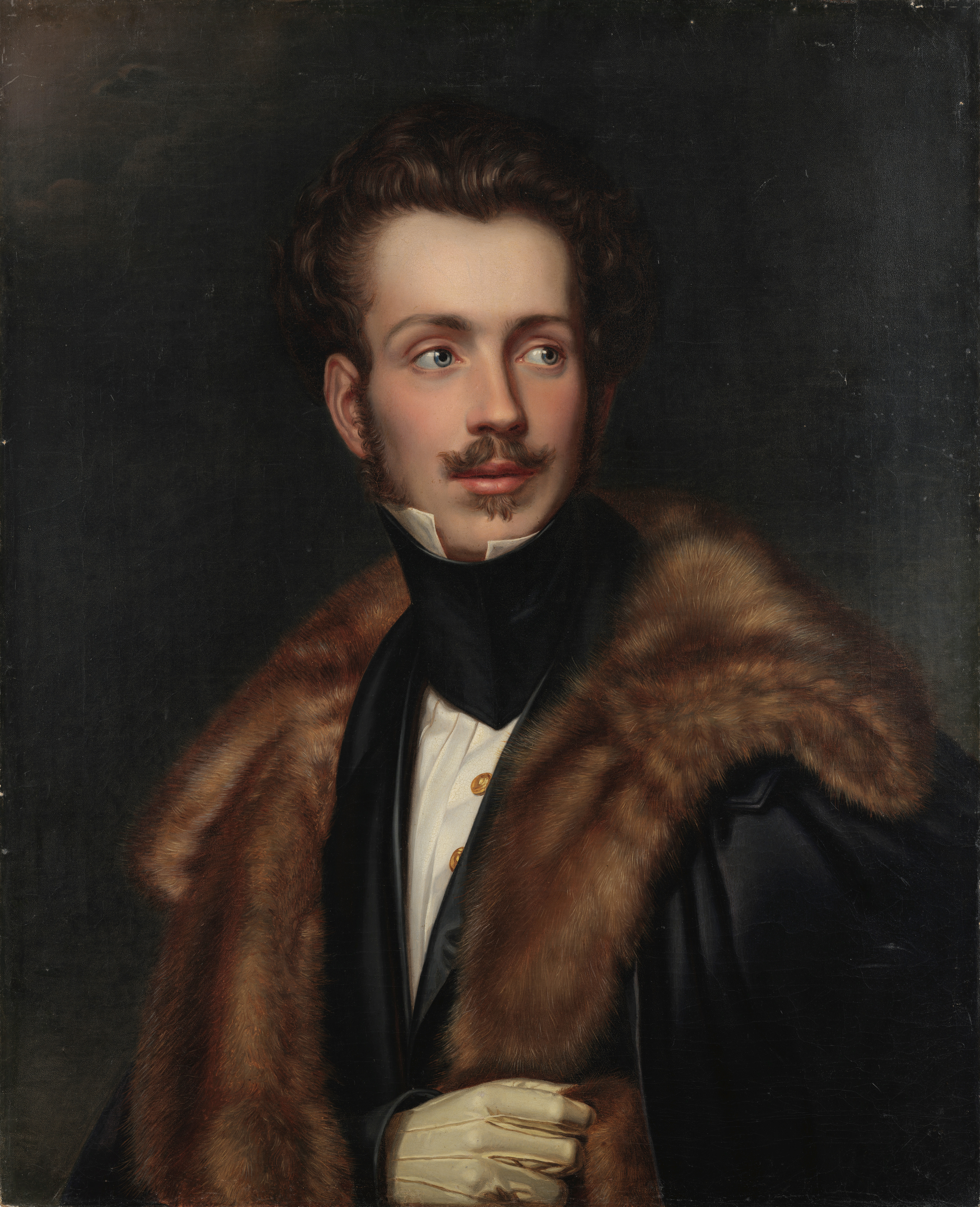
- Portrait by G. Dury, c. 1835

Prince consort of Portugal
- Tenure: 26 January 1835 – 28 March 1835

Duke of Leuchtenberg Prince of Eichstätt
- Tenure: 21 February 1824 – 28 March 1835
- Predecessor: Eugène de Beauharnais
- Successor: Maximilian de Beauharnais
- Born: 9 December 1810; Milan, Lombardy
- Died: 28 March 1835 (aged 24); Lisbon, Portugal
- Burial: Pantheon of the House of Braganza
- Spouse: Maria II of Portugal (m. 1835)
Names
- Auguste Charles Eugène Napoléon de Beauharnais
- House: Beauharnais
- Father: Eugène de Beauharnais
- Mother: Princess Augusta of Bavaria
- Coat of Arms of Auguste

Auguste Charles Eugène Napoléon de Beauharnais, Duke of Leuchtenberg (9 December 1810 – 28 March 1835) was the first prince consort of Maria II of Portugal. Besides being the 2nd Duke of Leuchtenberg and 2nd Prince of Eichstätt, he also held the Brazilian noble title of Duke of Santa Cruz.

== Family ==
Being born in Milan, Lombardy, Auguste was the eldest son of Eugène de Beauharnais, Napoleon I's stepson, and Princess Augusta of Bavaria. His dynastic connections were exceptional, considering his paternal lineage: among his sisters were Joséphine, Queen consort of Oscar I of Sweden, and Amélie, Empress consort of his future father-in-law Pedro I of Brazil. Later, his brother Maximilian would wed Grand Duchess Maria Nikolaevna of Russia, eldest daughter of Tsar Nicholas I.

== Duke of Leuchtenberg ==
His maternal grandfather, King Maximilian I of Bavaria, had given Eugène the title "Duke of Leuchtenberg" on 14 November 1817, after the loss in 1815 of his Napoleonic titles and the associated expectancies of the Kingdom of Italy and the Grand Duchy of Frankfurt. Despite the promise of an independent principality inserted into the final treaty, the Congress of Vienna adjourned without creating a state for Eugène, so Auguste and his siblings had no inheritance. To the empty Leuchtenberg ducal title had been added the estate of Eichstätt in dowry, made a nominal principality, also by King Maximilian. Eugène's eldest son Auguste was heir to this modest property, which he inherited when Eugène died on 21 February 1824.

On 4 February 1831 Leuchtenberg was one of three candidates for the throne of the newly independent Belgium, his Napoleonic connections allaying the concerns of some of the Great Powers worried that the breakaway Roman Catholic realm might otherwise ally itself too closely with the likewise Catholic and revolutionary "bourgeois monarchy" of Orléans France. But in the election by the Belgian National Congress, Auguste came in second after the younger son of the King of the French, Prince Louis, Duke of Nemours, though ahead of the Habsburg candidate, Archduke Charles, Duke of Teschen. As some involved in the decision were leery of Bonapartism, none of these men attained the Belgian throne, which went to Britain's candidate, Prince Leopold of Saxe-Coburg.

He escorted his sister Amélie to Brazil for her marriage to Emperor Pedro I and was created Duke of Santa Cruz by his new brother-in-law on 5 November 1829.

== Prince consort of Portugal ==
On 26 May 1834, young Queen Maria II of Portugal was restored to the throne of Portugal, gifted to her by the abdication – and subsequent conquest in war – of her father, Emperor Pedro I of Brazil, who had to do battle against the usurpation of his rebellious younger brother, Dom Miguel.

Maria's childhood betrothal to Dom Miguel was broken so that a more pliant husband could be found to beget a new Portuguese dynasty, one whose loyalty might prove more trustworthy if he had no other prospects, such that he would be entirely beholden for his dynastic fortune to Portugal's constitutional regime. The Queen obligingly settled on Auguste de Beauharnais who, once again, proved unthreatening to the Great Powers because of his lack of membership in an already reigning dynasty and lack of conflicting foreign obligations or ambitions. He was also the eldest brother of Maria's stepmother Empress Amélie.

Auguste and Maria II were married by proxy in Munich on 1 December 1834. The groom was almost twenty-four years old and the bride fifteen years old. On his wedding day his bride conferred upon him the Portuguese style of "His Royal Highness The Prince Consort of Portugal".

He arrived in Portugal shortly thereafter, and the couple were wed in person in Lisbon on 26 January 1835. However Auguste fell ill and died only two months later. The suddenness of this upon his arrival led to rumors that he had been poisoned, however no names of any suspects were ever produced.

Childless at the time of his death, Auguste left as heir in Bavaria his younger brother, who became the 3rd Duke of Leuchtenberg, and briefly Auguste's successor in ownership of Eichstätt which, however, he returned to the Bavarian king in 1855 upon deciding to make his home in Russia, the realm of his own father-in-law.

A year later Maria II married Ferdinand of Saxe-Coburg-Gotha, a nephew of the Coburg prince who had beat out her first husband in competition for the constitutional crown of Belgium.

Because Auguste died before fathering an heir to the Portuguese throne, he never became Maria's co-monarch, which Maria's next husband did in 1837, allowing Maria to continue the Braganza Dynasty.

== Honours ==
- Kingdom of Portugal:
  - Grand Cross of the Sash of the Three Orders, 1 December 1834 – wedding gift of his bride, Queen Maria II
  - Grand Cross of the Tower and Sword
- Kingdom of Spain: Knight of the Golden Fleece, 1835
- Sweden-Norway: Knight of the Seraphim, 14 March 1824

== Ancestry ==
Ancestors of Auguste, Duke of Leuchtenberg

8. François de Beauharnais, marquis de La Ferté-Beauharnais
4. Alexandre, vicomte de Beauharnais
9. Henriette Pyvart de Chastullé
2. Eugène, Duke of Leuchtenberg
10. Joseph Gaspard Tascher de La Pagerie
5. Joséphine Tascher de La Pagerie
11. Rose Claire des Vergers de Sannois
1. Auguste, Duke of Leuchtenberg
12. Frederick Michael, Count Palatine of Zweibrücken
6. Maximilian I Joseph of Bavaria
13. Countess Palatine Maria Franziska of Sulzbach
3. Princess Augusta of Bavaria
14. Prince George William of Hesse-Darmstadt
7. Princess Augusta Wilhelmine of Hesse-Darmstadt
15. Countess Maria Louise Albertine of Leiningen-Dagsburg-Falkenburg

Auguste, Duke of Leuchtenberg House of Beauharnais Born: 9 December 1810 Died: 28 March 1835
German nobility
Preceded by Eugène de Beauharnais	Duke of Leuchtenberg; 1824–1835	Succeeded by Maximilian de Beauharnais
Preceded by Eugène de Beauharnais	Prince of Eichstätt; 1824–1835	Reverted to the Crown
French nobility
Preceded by Joséphine de Beauharnais	Duke of Navarre; 1814–1835	Succeeded by Maximilian de Beauharnais
Brazilian nobility
New title	Duke of Santa Cruz; 1829–1835	Title extinct
Portuguese royalty
Vacant Title last held by Maria Leopoldina of Austria as queen consort	Prince consort of Portugal; 1835–1835	Vacant Title next held by Ferdinand of Saxe-Coburg-Gotha
