= Sergei Georgievich, 8th Duke of Leuchtenberg =

Duke of Leuchtenberg from 1942 to 1974

Sergei Georgievich
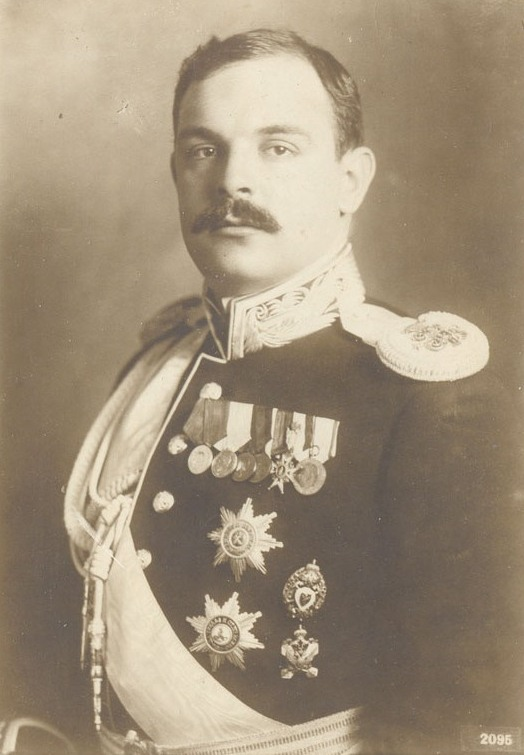
- Sergei Georgievich, c. 1917

Duke of Leuchtenberg
- Reign: 26 September 1942 – 7 January 1974
- Predecessor: Alexander Georgievich, 7th Duke of Leuchtenberg
- Born: 4 July 1890; Peterhof, Russian Empire
- Died: 7 January 1974 (aged 83); Rome, Italy
- House: Beauharnais
- Father: George Maximilianovich, 6th Duke of Leuchtenberg
- Mother: Princess Anastasia of Montenegro

Prince Sergei Georgievich Romanowsky, 8th Duke of Leuchtenberg (4 July 1890 – 7 January 1974), was the son of Prince George Maximilianovich Romanowsky, 6th Duke of Leuchtenberg, and his second wife, Princess Anastasia of Montenegro. He succeeded his half-brother Alexander Georgievich as Duke of Leuchtenberg in 1942 and held the title until his death in 1974.

== Background and early life ==
Coat of arms of the Russian Dukes of Leuchtenberg (1856), representing the family's heritage, their connection to the House of Beauharnais, and their status within both German and Russian nobility, and dynastic alliances through heraldry.

Prince Sergei was born on 4 July 1890 in Peterhof, Russian Empire, to George Maximilianovich, 6th Duke of Leuchtenberg, and Princess Anastasia of Montenegro. By patrilineal descent, he stemmed from the French noble House of Beauharnais, which settled in Russia. Sergei was styled His Serene Highness from birth until 1899 when he was granted the style of His Highness. George's first wife, Duchess Therese Petrovna of Oldenburg, died in 1883, leaving a young son. Sergei's father remarried six years later, when he caught the attention of Princess Anastasia of Montenegro at her sister Milica's engagement. George and Anastasia soon married and produced two children, Prince Sergei Georgievich and Princess Elena Georgievna, later Countess Tyszkiewicz (1892–1971). Anastasia divorced her husband in 1906 in order to marry Grand Duke Nicholas Nikolaevich of Russia.

== Later years ==
Sergei introduced Alexander Andreyevich Svechin to his step-father Grand Duke Nicholas Nikolaevich, who was known for his religiosity and interest in mysticism. Grand Duke Nicholas died in 1929, and Sergei attended his funeral along with his sister Princess Elena.

Sergei died 16 December 1974 in Rome and was buried in the non-Catholic cemetery for foreigners in Testaccio, Rome, Italy. He never married and was the last undisputed Duke of Leuchtenberg (now living descendants of the Dukes of Leuchtenberg have descended from a morganatic marriage, which is why they lost their dynastic status of the members of the Russian Imperial House and the right to the Bavarian ducal title and style).

== Honours and arms ==
He received the following honours:

- Knight of the Order of St. Andrew, 1912
- Knight of the Order of St. Alexander Nevsky, 1912
- Knight of the Order of the White Eagle, 1912
- Knight of the Order of St. Anna, 1st Class, 1912; 4th Class, with inscription "for Valor", 19 January 1915
- Knight of the Order of St. Stanislaus, 1st Class, 1912
- Knight of the Order of St. Vladimir, 4th Class, with Swords and Bow, 5 March 1915
- Grand Cross of the Order of Danilo I of Montenegro
- Commemoration Medal for the Golden Jubilee of King Nicholas I of Montenegro

== Ancestry ==
Ancestors of Sergei Georgievich, 8th Duke of Leuchtenberg

8. Eugène de Beauharnais, 1st Duke of Leuchtenberg
4. Maximilian de Beauharnais, 3rd Duke of Leuchtenberg
9. Princess Augusta of Bavaria
2. George Maximilianovich, 6th Duke of Leuchtenberg
10. Nicholas I of Russia
5. Grand Duchess Maria Nikolaevna of Russia
11. Princess Charlotte of Prussia
1. Sergei Georgievich, 8th Duke of Leuchtenberg
12. Mirko Petrović-Njegoš, Grand Voivode of Grahovo
6. Nicholas I of Montenegro
13. Anastasija Martinović
3. Princess Anastasia of Montenegro
14. Voivode Petar Vukotić
7. Milena Vukotić
15. Jelena Vojvodić

== Notes ==
Sergei Georgievich, 8th Duke of Leuchtenberg House of Beauharnais Born: 4 July 1890 Died: 7 January 1974
Titles in pretence
Preceded by Alexander Maximilianovich	— TITULAR — Duke of Leuchtenberg; 26 September 1942 – 7 January 1974	Succeeded by Nicholas Nikolaevich (contested)
