= Château de Navarre =

Château in Normandy, France

Coordinates: 49.0097°N 1.1134°E

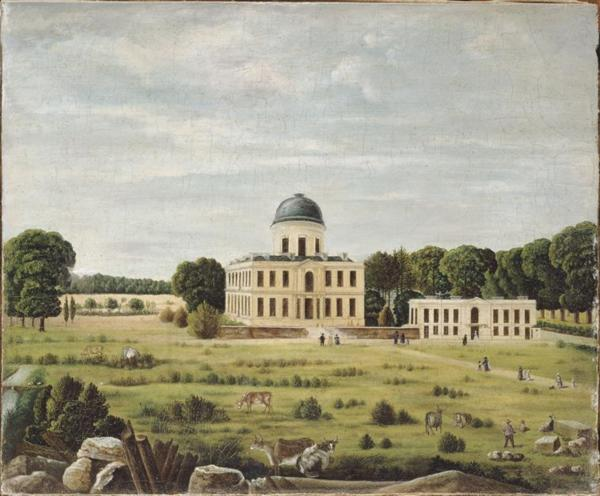
The Château de Navarre, near Evreux

The Château de Navarre was a château near Évreux in Normandy. The medieval structure was built for Queen Joan II of Navarre (wife of Count Philip of Évreux) and later came into the possession of the House of La Tour d'Auvergne.

In 1750 a new Chateau was built, possibly incorporating part of the medieval structure and two towers dating from the seventeenth century. Built by a relative of the great marshal General of France Henri de la Tour d'Auvergne, Vicomte de Turenne, the new building was created in the form of a cube surmounted by a large dome. It was intended that a large statue of Marshal Turenne would be placed on top of the dome, but this never eventuated. The Chateau was burned down in 1834 and the remains were demolished two years later.

The chateau was surrounded by the forest of Evreux, being part of the principality of Bearn.
Joan and Antoine lived here during their rule. From there it passed on to other families and in 1810 became the home of Napoleon's ex-wife, Joséphine de Beauharnais, created Duchess of Navarre. After Josephine, the Comte Roy, minister of Finance, gained possession of the property. It became the residences of the Duke of Bouillon and then later the Duke of Leuchtenberg, his grandson, who authorized by an Act, sold the property in 1834 to the Marquis de Dauvet, for the sum of 1.2 million francs.

The chateau caught fire in 1834, and the burnt-out shell was demolished in 1836. On the land a factory was built and the land and meadows were sold. As for the forest of Évreux, depending formerly the domain of Navarre, it was not part of the prerogative of the Empress Josephine. This forest was sold at around the same time as the castle, by the princes of Rohan, heirs of the last duke of Bouillon. It did not become the property of the City of Évreux until 1981. On the location of the castle is now a racecourse and the area became known as the "neighborhood of Navarre."

The building was in the shape of a cube. It was fenced in on four sides by balustrades and had four granite stairways leading to four entrances. The chateau was topped with a dome that was covered in lead.

== Jeanne of Navarre ==
In the 16th century, Queen Joan ruled with her husband Antoine of Navarre for many years, during this time they were called to the King of France. It was proposed that Joan and Antoine should give up their lands to the Kingdom of France in exchange for territory in France. The Kingdom of Navarre would have passed into French control and they royalty of Navarre would become princelings. Joan refused this offer and the Kingdom of Navarre stayed as it was until her death. Henry IV was the son of Jeanne and Antoine and would gain the title King of France and Navarre when he became king.

== Josephine ==
During the First Empire it was granted to Napoleon's ex-wife Joséphine, who was created Duchess of Navarre. In the period following his divorce of Josephine, Napoleon showed many acts of kindness and gestures of respect to her - bestowing this property with its income was one of these. However, it also enabled him to make sure she was not in Paris during the marriage celebrations to his second wife Marie-Louise and on any subsequent occasion when her presence might have been awkward.

When Josephine arrived at the Chateau she was not pleased with the state that the Chateau had fallen into. She was not very impressed with the inconvenient layout of the house, which was arranged around a three storey high circular salon lit by windows beneath the dome. The great central salon was impossible to heat and many of the other rooms rather small. Uninhabited for some time the building was shabby and some of the wood panelling actually rotten. Arriving as she did in the depths of winter the garden was not shown to advantage as the bare trees exposed vast areas of water. The chateau had been built in the middle of a marshy area and despite attempts to form decorative canals, cascades and ponds the amount of water that surrounded the Chateau gave a very bleak outlook. combined with the shabby, cold and doubtless draughty chateau the overall effect was depressing.

As a result, she wrote to Napoleon telling him that she was going to repair all of the ruins and embellish the estate with the bounty assigned to her. While doing these repairs she spent a considerable amount of money returning the chateau to its previous state, and, admittedly in the spring when the garden flowers returned the property showed a certain amount of charm and elegance.

Josephine had the water that pooled around the chateau (the former moat) turned from a stagnant body of water into a flowing waterway . The adjacent marshy area was filled in and used to expand the stables, and the surrounding area benefitted as well. Josephine established plantations, caused the marshes to be drained, erected public buildings and provided the peasants with work opportunities. She also improved the roads leading to and from the forest of Évreux. Comte Roy acquired the property after Josephine and he let the property fall back into disrepair.

== Current state ==
After the destruction of the chateau in the 1830s the grounds were largely allowed to return to a natural state of woodland, the site of the chateau was apparently built upon as a factory and the gardens and meadows belonging to the property sold. The neighbouring "Forest of Évreux", formerly part of the domain of Navarre, had not been part of the property during the Empress Josephine's time. This forest was sold at around the same time as the castle, by the princes of Rohan, heirs of the last duke of Bouillon. In 1981 it became the property of the City of Évreux and is now safeguarded as a nature reserve. Today there is little evidence of the property's past; apart from the forest reserve much of the landscape is now unrecognisable - the suburbs of Evraux are encroaching on much of the surrounding farmland and the site of the castle itself has been a racecourse since 1905.

== Property Owners ==
- Jeanne d'Albret and Antoine of Navarre - It was built for Jeanne and was their home for many years until his death in 1562 and hers a decade later.
- Duke of Bouillon - had it rebuilt for him in 1689
- Joséphine de Beauharnais - lived in Navarre and Malmaison for 2 years, spending a couple of months at a time in both places.
- Comte Roy - acquired the property after Josephine.
