= George Buchanan (diplomat) =

British diplomat (1854–1924)

The Right Honourable Sir George Buchanan GCB, GCMG, GCVO, PC
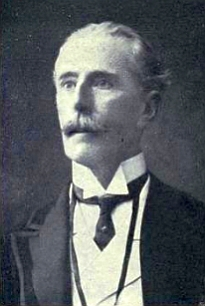
- Sir George Buchanan

Envoy Extraordinary and Minister Plenipotentiary to His Majesty the King of the Bulgarians
- In office 1903–1908
- Monarch: George V
- Prime Minister: H. H. Asquith; David Lloyd George
- Preceded by: Position established
- Succeeded by: Mansfeldt Findlay

Envoy Extraordinary and Minister Plenipotentiary to Her Majesty the Queen of the Netherlands, and also to His Royal Highness the Grand Duke of Luxemburg
- In office 1908–1910
- Preceded by: Sir Henry Howard
- Succeeded by: Sir Alan Johnstone

British Ambassador to the Russian Empire
- In office 1910–1917
- Preceded by: Sir Arthur Nicolson
- Succeeded by: no representation following the Russian Revolution and Civil War; Sir Robert Hodgson

British Ambassador to The Kingdom of Italy
- In office 1919–1921
- Preceded by: Sir Rennell Rodd
- Succeeded by: Sir Ronald Graham

Personal details
- Born: George William Buchanan; 25 November 1854 Copenhagen, Denmark
- Died: 20 December 1924 (aged 70) London, England, United Kingdom

Sir George William Buchanan, GCB, GCMG, GCVO, PC (25 November 1854 – 20 December 1924) was a British diplomat. Born in Copenhagen, Denmark, he was the youngest son of the diplomat Sir Andrew Buchanan, 1st Baronet and Frances, daughter of the Very Rev Edward Mellish and Elizabeth Leigh.

== Diplomatic career ==
Buchanan entered diplomatic service in 1876 and served as Second Secretary in Tokyo, Vienna and Bern and as Secretary in Rome. By 1899, he was serving on the Venezuelan Boundary Commission and later that year was appointed chargé d'affaires at Darmstadt and Karlsruhe. In late 1901, he moved to Berlin, where he was appointed First Secretary at the British embassy. From 1903 to 1908, he was Envoy Extraordinary and Minister Plenipotentiary to Bulgaria, and in 1909, he was appointed as Minister to the Netherlands and Luxembourg. Invested with the Knight's Grand Cross of Royal Victorian Order in 1909, he was next sworn to the Privy Council. In 1910, Buchanan was appointed as the British ambassador to Russia. He kept abreast of the political developments in Russia and met some of the leading liberal reformists in the country.

When the Dardanelles were guaranteed by Germany to the Ottoman Empire, Italy sent two secret documents via the British diplomatic corps from Sir Michael Rodd to Buchanan at St Petersburg. They were the evidence that Russia needed to persuade Italy to support its Serbian policy in the Balkans. On 4 March 1915, Imperiali, the Italian envoy to London, presented the documents to Sir Edward Grey on the 16 February authority from Italian Foreign Minister Sonnino. France attached great importance to Italy's decision to join the Allies. Buchanan brought Count Sazonov to the negotiating table.

It has been suggested that to have been secretly encouraged by the then Liberal government in London:

The British Ambassador George Buchanan was only too aware of the court's 'pro-German sympathies'. He complained to the Duma President, M.V. Rodzianko, in November 1916 that he found it difficult to get an audience at court, and expressed his view 'that Germany is using Alexandra Fedorovna to set the Tsar against the Allies'. Elsewhere, however, Buchanan stated his view that the Empress was 'the unwitting instrument of Germany'.

Buchanan had developed a strong bond with Tsar Nicholas II and attempted to convince him that granting some constitutional reform would stave off revolution. Buchanan actively supported the Duma in its efforts to change Russia's state system during wartime. Nicholas's opinion of him was influenced by the Tsarina. Knowing that there were plots to stage a palace coup to replace him, Buchanan formally requested an audience with the Tsar in the troubled early days of 1917. At his last meeting with Nicholas, Buchanan pleaded with him in 'undiplomatic' language: "I can but plead as my excuse the fact that I have throughout been inspired by my feelings of devotion for Your Majesty and the Empress. If I were to see a friend walking through a wood on a dark night along a path which I knew ended in a precipice, would it not be my duty, sir, to warn him of his danger? And is it not equally my duty to warn Your Majesty of the abyss that lies ahead of you? You have, sir, come to the parting of the ways, and you have now to choose between two paths. The one will lead you to victory and a glorious peace – the other to revolution and disaster. Let me implore Your Majesty to choose the former."

Although the Tsar was touched by the Ambassador's devotion, he allowed his wife's malevolent attitudes to outweigh the sensible advice that he had been given. After the collapse of the autocracy (see Grand Duke Michael Alexandrovich of Russia), he developed close relations with the liberal Provisional Government, which was led initially by George Lvov and later by Alexander Kerensky and was formed after the February Revolution. At the same time, Buchanan developed a fear of the dangers of Bolshevism and its growing support. He feared that the Russian Provisional Government would be toppled and tried to warn of the fragility of the government and the dangers of a Bolshevik revolution. Buchanan had reported to London: "They are more active and better organized than any other group, and until they and the ideas which they represent are finally squashed, the country will remain a prey to anarchy and disorder. If the Government are not strong enough to put down the Bolsheviks by force, at the risk of breaking altogether with the soviet, the only alternative will be a Bolshevik Government." However, after the events of the October Revolution and the Bolsheviks' ascension to power, Buchanan was widely criticized for failing to ensure that Tsar and his family were evacuated from Russia before their execution by the Bolsheviks at Ekaterinburg in 1918. It is now known that was not the fault of Buchanan but that of the Tsar's first cousin, King George V, who feared revolutionary trends in Britain and the stability of his own throne and so persuaded the Lloyd George government to rescind the offer that had been made to provide sanctuary for the Imperial Family.

Buchanan was disappointed that the fledgling democracy offered by the Provisional Government was strangled by the Bolshevik coup.

In early December 1918, Buchanan fell ill and for the good of his health agreed that it was best for him to leave Russia. His family left St Petersburg on 26 December 1918 and arrived back in Leith, in Scotland, on 17 January 1919. His health soon collapsed, which forced him to spend time recovering in Cornwall.

After his recovery, he was disappointed that after all of his years of service, he was not given a peerage and offered only a two-year ambassadorship in Rome. He accepted the post and served as ambassador to the Kingdom of Italy from 1919 to 1921. While in Italy his wife was found to have terminal cancer and died in April 1921, soon after the family's return to England.

Buchanan's autobiography, My Mission to Russia and Other Diplomatic Memories, was published in 1923. It is believed that he had to leave out some of what he knew for fear of losing his pension. He died in 1924.

== Honours ==
British decorations

- Order of the Bath
  - CB: Companion of the Order of the Bath (civil division) – announced in the 1900 New Year Honours honours list on 1 January 1900, gazetted on 16 January 1900, and invested by Queen Victoria at Windsor Castle on 1 March 1900. – "for services on the Venezuelan Boundary Commission"
  - GCB: Knight Grand Cross of the Order of the Bath - 1913
- Order of St Michael and St George
  - KCMG: Knight Commander of the Order of St Michael and St George - 1909
  - GCMG: Knight Grand Cross of the Order of St Michael and St George - 1913
- Royal Victorian Order
  - CVO: Commander of the Royal Victorian Order - 1900
  - KCVO: Knight Commander of the Royal Victorian Order - 1905 - on the occasion of the visit to London of HRH the Prince of Bulgaria
  - GCVO: Knight Grand Cross of the Royal Victorian Order - 1909

== Family ==
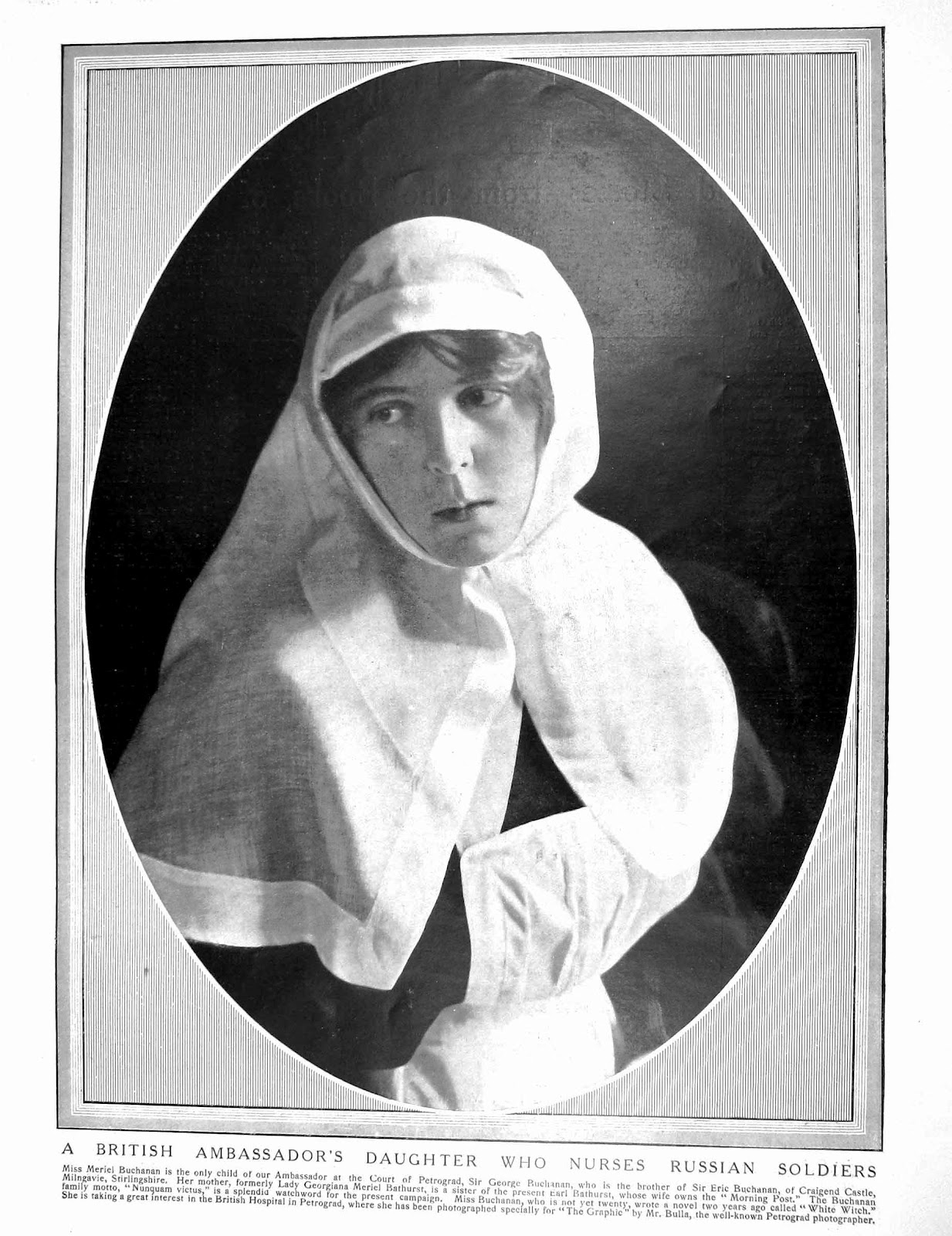
Miss Meriel Buchanan in The Graphic, c1916, by Mr Bulla of Petrograd.

Sir George married on 25 February 1885 Lady Georgiana Meriel Bathurst (1863–1922), daughter of Allen Bathurst, 6th Earl Bathurst with the Hon. Meriel Warren (1839–1872), daughter of George Warren, 2nd Baron de Tabley.

Their only child, daughter Meriel Buchanan (1886–1959). wrote several perceptive books about the Russian October Revolution, which she witnessed, and key figures she had personally known.

== Publications ==
- Buchanan, George (1923). My mission to Russia and other diplomatic memories. London, New York: Cassell. OL 6656274M.

== See also ==
- Princess Victoria Melita of Edinburgh and Saxe-Coburg-Gotha
- Alexander Palace
- Nicholas II of Russia

Diplomatic posts
Preceded by	Envoy Extraordinary and Minister Plenipotentiary to His Majesty the King the Bulgarians; 1903–1908	Succeeded by Mansfeldt Findlay
Preceded by Sir Henry Howard	Envoy Extraordinary and Minister Plenipotentiary to Her Majesty the Queen of the Netherlands, and also to His Royal Highness the Grand Duke of Luxemburg; 1908–1910	Succeeded by Sir Alan Johnstone
Preceded by Sir Arthur Nicolson, Bt.	British Ambassador to the Russian Empire; 1910–1917	Succeeded by no representation following Russian revolution
Preceded by Sir Rennell Rodd	British Ambassador to Italy; 1919–1921	Succeeded by Sir Ronald Graham
