= Princess Anastasia of Montenegro =

Grand Duchess of Russia, Duchess of Leuchtenberg

Princess Anastasia
- Duchess of Leuchtenberg; Princess of Eichstätt; Grand Duchess Anastasia Nikolaevna of Russia
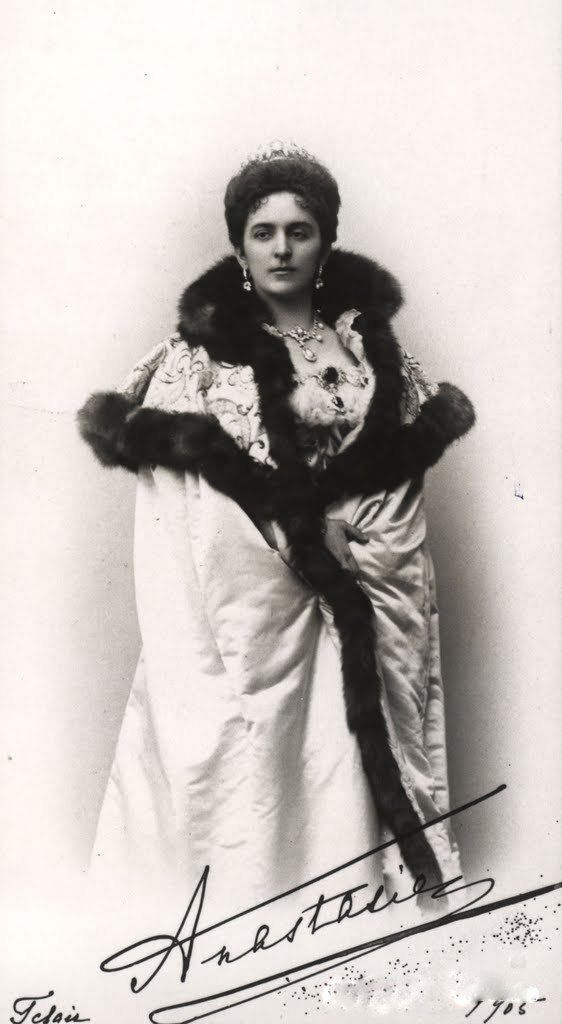
- Photograph, c. 1905
- Born: 4 January 1868; Cetinje, Montenegro
- Died: 15 November 1935 (aged 67); Cap d'Antibes, France
- Burial: St. Michael the Archangel Church (1935–2015); Chapel of the Transfiguration of Our Lord in the Bratsky military cemetery in Moscow (since 2015)
- Spouse: George Maximilianovich, 6th Duke of Leuchtenberg (m. 1889; div. 1906) Grand Duke Nicholas Nikolaevich of Russia (m. 1907; died 1929)
- Issue: Sergei Georgievich, 8th Duke of Leuchtenberg; Princess Elena Georgievna, Countess Tyszkiewicz
Names
- Anastasia Petrović-Njegoš
- House: Petrović-Njegoš
- Father: Nicholas I of Montenegro
- Mother: Milena Vukotić

Princess Anastasia Petrović-Njegoš of Montenegro (4 January 1868 [O.S. 23 December 1867] – 25 November 1935) was a daughter of Nicholas I of Montenegro and his wife, Queen Milena. Through her second marriage to Grand Duke Nicholas Nikolaevich of Russia, she became a Russian grand duchess. She and her sister, Milica ("Militza"), having married Russian royal brothers, were known colloquially as the "Montenegrin princesses" or the "Black peril" during the last days of the Russian Empire, and may have contributed to its downfall by the introduction of Grigori Rasputin to Empress Alexandra Feodorovna.

== Life ==
=== Early life ===
Princess Anastasia was born in Cetinje, Montenegro, on 4 January 1868, the third child and daughter of King Nicholas I of Montenegro. Although named Anastasia at birth after her paternal grandmother, she was often known as Princess Stana Petrovich Njegosh of Montenegro. Her father obtained the style of Royal Highness in 1900. She retained her childhood nickname of Stana to close relations.

Anastasia was educated at the Smolny Institute with her older sister, Princess Milica.

=== First marriage ===
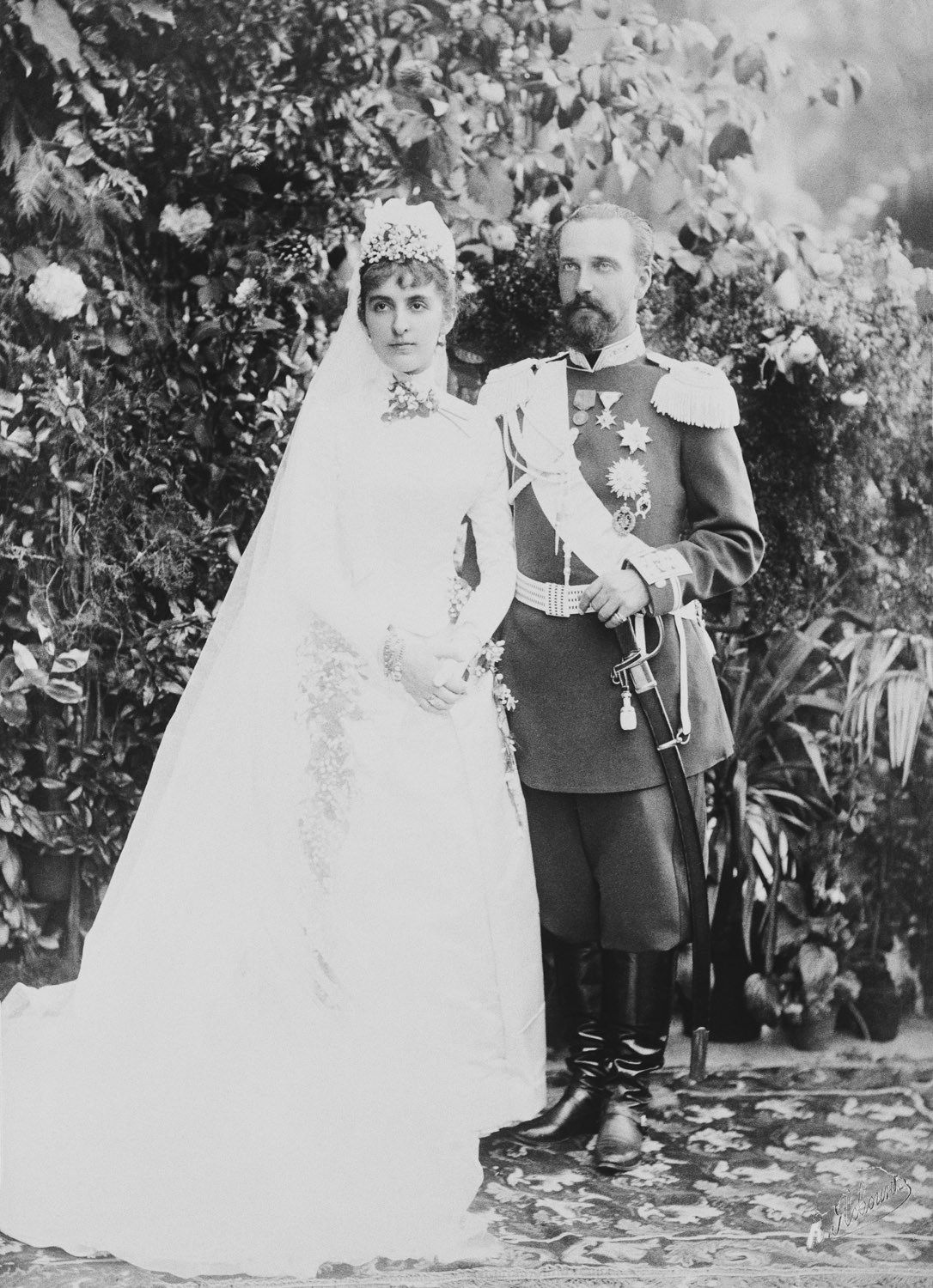
Wedding photo of Princess Anastasia and her first husband, George Maximilianovich, 6th Duke of Leuchtenberg, taken at Peterhof Palace (1889)

On 28 August 1889 N.S., at the Russian imperial palace of Peterhof, Stana married Prince George Maximilianovich of Leuchtenberg (later the Duke of Leuchtenberg.) The Duke had previously been married and widowed, with one son, Alexander Georgievich, from his prior marriage to Therese of Oldenburg. The couple had two children:

- Sergei Georgievich, 8th Duke von Leuchtenberg (4 July 1890 – 7 January 1974).
- Elena Georgievna, Duchess of Leuchtenberg, Princess Romanovskaya (3 January 1892 – 6 February 1971). She married on 18 July 1917, in Yalta, Count Stefan Tyszkiewicz (1894–1976, London). He was the son of Count Władysław Tyszkiewicz and Princess Krystyna Maria Lubomirska. By birth, he was a member of powerful and wealthy Tyszkiewicz family, one of few families which belonged to Magnates of Poland and Lithuania.

=== Second marriage ===
On 29 April 1907, at the age of 39, Anastasia was married to Grand Duke Nicholas Nikolaevich of Russia (1856–1929). The marriage was childless. Both her husbands were descendants of Emperor Nicholas I of Russia: the first one was his grandson through a maternal line, and the second one was his grandson through a direct male line.

Both Anastasia and her second husband Nicholas were religious Eastern Orthodox Christians, with a tendency to and interest in Persian mysticism. Since the Montenegrins were a fiercely Slavic, anti-Turkish people from the Balkans, Anastasia reinforced the pan-Slav tendencies of Nicholas. Her sister, Princess Milica, was married to Grand Duke Peter Nikolaevich of Russia, brother of Grand Duke Nicholas Nikolaevich. The two Montenegrin princesses were thus also sisters-in-law, as their husbands were brothers.

Anastasia and her sister were intrigued by the more mystical side of the Eastern Orthodox religion; they were early supporters of the French seer "Dr." Philippe Vachot and of the starets Rasputin, and introduced both in turn to the Empress Alexandra Feodorovna, the last Empress of Russia. According to popular Russian belief, the influence of Rasputin was instrumental in the downfall of the Romanov family.

Anastasia's husband, Grand Duke Nicholas Nikolaevich of Russia (1856–1929), was the commander-in-chief of the Russian Army during the first year of World War I, carrying out campaigns on the Austro-German front and in the Caucasus. His Supreme Commandership was terminated by Emperor Nicholas II on 21 August 1915.

=== Post-revolution ===
In March 1917, Nicholas II was overthrown and the Romanov dynasty came to an end. Anastasia and her husband lived from 1917 to 1919 first in the Caucasus, then in the Crimea. From Yalta in the Crimea, Anastasia and her husband escaped Russia in 1919 aboard a British battleship, HMS Marlborough. They settled briefly in Italy, living with her sister Elena, Queen of Italy and later in France, spending winters on the Côte d'Azur.

== Death ==
She died in Cap d'Antibes on 15 November 1935, having outlived her husband by six years. Grand Duchess Anastasia and her husband died in exile and were originally buried in the church of St. Archangel Michael in Cannes, France. Requests to transfer their remains came from Prince Nicholas Romanov (who died in 2014) and his brother, Prince Dimitri Romanov (who died in 2016), and were made in 2014. Their remains were re-buried in Moscow, at the Bratsky military cemetery in May 2015.
