= George Maximilianovich, 6th Duke of Leuchtenberg =

Duke of Leuchtenberg from 1901 to 1912

George Maximilianovich de Beauharnais
- Prince Romanovsky
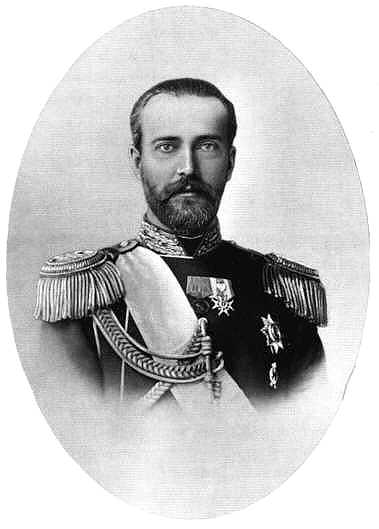

Duke of Leuchtenberg
- Reign: 31 August 1901 – 16 May 1912
- Predecessor: Eugen Maximilianovich
- Successor: Alexander Georgievich
- Born: 29 February 1852; Saint Petersburg, Russian Empire
- Died: 16 May 1912 (aged 60); Paris, France
- Burial: Grand Ducal Mausoleum
- Spouse: Duchess Therese Petrovna of Oldenburg (m. 1879; died 1883) Princess Anastasia of Montenegro (m. 1889; div. 1906)
- Issue: Alexander Georgievich, 7th Duke of Leuchtenberg; Sergei Georgievich, 8th Duke of Leuchtenberg; Princess Elena Georgievna, Countess Tyszkiewicz
- House: Beauharnais
- Father: Maximilian de Beauharnais, 3rd Duke of Leuchtenberg
- Mother: Grand Duchess Maria Nikolaevna of Russia

Prince George Maximilianovich Romanowsky, 6th Duke of Leuchtenberg (29 February 1852 – 16 May 1912), also known as Prince Georgii Romanovsky or Georges de Beauharnais, was the youngest son of Maximilian de Beauharnais, 3rd Duke of Leuchtenberg, and Grand Duchess Maria Nikolaevna of Russia.

== Family and early life ==
George's father Maximilian de Beauharnais, 3rd Duke of Leuchtenberg had traveled to Saint Petersburg, eventually winning the hand of Grand Duchess Maria Nikolaevna, Nicholas I's eldest daughter in 1839. Maximilian was subsequently bestowed with the style Imperial Highness. As the son of a Russian grand duchess and an ennobled Russian prince Romanowsky, George and his siblings were treated as princes and princesses of the blood, bearing the styles Imperial Highness. To his family, he was known as Yuri.

After their father's death in 1852, Grand Duchess Maria morganatically remarried to Count Grigori Stroganov two years later. As this union was kept secret from her father Emperor Nicholas I (and her brother Emperor Alexander II could not permit the union, preferring instead to feign ignorance), Maria was forced into exile abroad. Alexander felt sympathy for his sister, however, and paid special attention to her children from her first marriage, who lived in Saint Petersburg without their mother.

== Marriage ==
=== Marriage to Therese ===
On 12 May 1879, George married Duchess Therese Petrovna of Oldenburg, a daughter of Duke Peter Georgievich of Oldenburg and Princess Therese of Nassau-Weilburg. Therese's elder brother Duke Alexander Petrovich had been married to George's sister Princess Eugenia Maximilianovna since 1868. Therese's grandfather had married Grand Duchess Catherine Pavlovna, daughter of Paul I of Russia, and their descendants had been raised in Russia ever since and become completely "Russianized", much like George's own family. Thus, despite her German title, Duchess Therese, like her father before her, had grown up entirely in Russia. She was always considered a part of the Russian imperial family.

George and Theresa had one son:

- Alexander Georgievich, 7th Duke of Leuchtenberg (1881–1942); morganatically married Nadezhda Caralli.

In July 1881, the British Reserve Squadron held entertainments on board HMS Hercules, which was stationed in Kronstadt. The luncheon was attended by Therese and her husband, as well as the Emperor and Empress and other important royal Russian and German figures. Two years later, on 19 April 1883, tragedy struck the couple when Duchess Therese died in Saint Petersburg.

=== Marriage to Anastasia ===
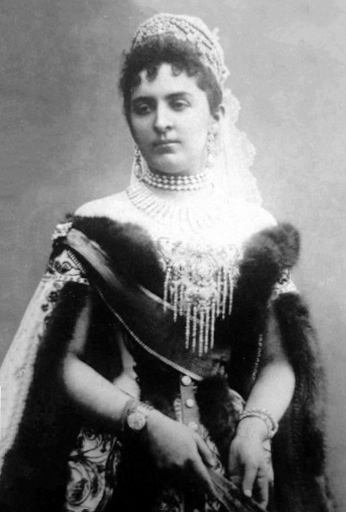
George's second wife Princess Anastasia of Montenegro

Two Montenegrin princesses, Milica and Anastasia, were educated at the Smolny Institute of Noble Maidens in Saint Petersburg under the immediate protection of Empress Maria Feodorovna. They remained at the convent for a year after their educations were complete, and made themselves extremely popular by enjoying themselves in society. Both girls soon caught the eye of two members of the Russian imperial family: Grand Duke Peter Nikolaevich, and George himself.

On 16 April 1889 at Sergeyevsko Estate, George married Princess Anastasia of Montenegro, six years after Therese's death. Emperor Alexander III gave Anastasia a grand trousseau, as well as a considerable dowry.

They had two children:

- Sergei Georgievich, 8th Duke of Leuchtenberg (1890–1974); died unmarried
- Princess Elena Georgievna of Leuchtenberg (1892–1971); married Count Stefan Tyszkiewicz.

The family owned a small estate near the Black Sea, where they spent the winter. While staying there in 1905, they witnessed the battleship Potemkin revolt. In the spring, the family stayed at their Peterhof residence the Villa Sergievskaia Datcha for the entire following summer.

When still married to his second wife, George moved in with his French mistress, to the great anger of the morally rigid Emperor Alexander III. When told that George was spending his vacations at the coastal town of Biarritz in south-western France, Alexander declared "So the prince is washing his filthy body in the waves of the ocean".

Their marriage was considered "tempestuous and stormy," with George reportedly "insult[ing] and outrag[ing] her from the very first day of their marriage". Anastasia was able to obtain a divorce from him several years into their marriage, on 15 November 1906. Various sources attribute George to have been good-looking but a "stupid and rather sorry individual", although these reports were most often in connection with his second wife, who, when arranging her divorce from George, was widely reported to want to do so because she could no longer live with a man of "intolerable stupidity". Anastasia later remarried to Grand Duke Nicholas Nikolaevich of Russia, a grandson of Nicholas I of Russia (and on his mother's side a nephew of George's first wife Theresa). She and her sister became famous in Russian society as the "black peril" so called because of their home country of Montenegro, their dark complexions and their interest in the occult.

== Later years ==
In 1901, through either the deaths or morganatic marriages of his elder brothers, George became the head of the Russian branch of the House of Beauharnais. At the turn of the twentieth century, when still married to Princess Anastasia of Montenegro, George was considered as a possible successor to the childless Alexander I of Serbia. Alexander was overthrown and murdered in a military coup, and succeeded by Peter I of Serbia.

George inherited a large collection of paintings, sculptures, and other works of art from his father, who had brought them with him when he moved from Munich to Saint Petersburg to marry Grand Duchess Maria Nikolaevna of Russia. He was buried in tomb #29 of the Grand Ducal Mausoleum in the Peter and Paul Fortress in St. Petersburg.

=== Legacy ===
George was the only one of his brothers to make a legitimate dynastic union. As both of his sons failed to produce legitimate issue, the Bavarian title Duke of Leuchtenberg went extinct in 1974.

George appears as a character in The White Night of St. Petersburg, written by a relative, Prince Michael of Greece and Denmark.

== Honours ==
Coat of arms of the Dukes of Leuchtenberg

He received the following decorations and awards:

Russian orders and decorations

- Knight of St. Andrew, 1852
- Knight of St. Alexander Nevsky, 1852
- Knight of the White Eagle, 1852
- Knight of St. Anna, 1st Class, 1852
- Knight of St. Stanislaus, 1st Class, 23 June 1865
- Knight of St. Vladimir, 4th Class, 1897; 3rd Class, 1908

Foreign orders and decorations

- Knight of the Annunciation, 1902 (Kingdom of Italy)
- Knight of the Seraphim, 20 June 1876 (Sweden-Norway)
- Grand Cross of the Order of Duke Peter Friedrich Ludwig, with Golden Crown, 14 February 1879 (Grand Duchy of Oldenburg)
- Knight of St. Hubert, 1879 (Kingdom of Bavaria)
- Grand Cross of the Württemberg Crown, 1872 (Kingdom of Württemberg)

== Ancestry ==
Ancestors of George Maximilianovich, 6th Duke of Leuchtenberg

8. Alexandre, vicomte de Beauharnais
4. Eugène de Beauharnais, 1st Duke of Leuchtenberg
9. Joséphine Tascher de La Pagerie
2. Maximilian de Beauharnais, 3rd Duke of Leuchtenberg
10. Maximilian I Joseph of Bavaria
5. Princess Amalia Augusta of Bavaria
11. Princess Augusta Wilhelmine of Hesse-Darmstadt
1. George Maximilianovich, 6th Duke of Leuchtenberg
12. Paul I of Russia
6. Nicholas I of Russia
13. Duchess Sophie Dorothea of Württemberg
3. Grand Duchess Maria Nikolaevna of Russia
14. Frederick William III of Prussia
7. Princess Charlotte of Prussia
15. Louise of Mecklenburg-Strelitz

George Maximilianovich, 6th Duke of Leuchtenberg House of Beauharnais Born: 29 February 1852 Died: 16 May 1912
German nobility
Preceded by Eugen Maximilianovich	Duke of Leuchtenberg; 31 August 1901 – 16 May 1912	Succeeded by Alexander Georgievich
