= Principality of Eichstätt =

Former monarchy in Bavaria

- 1817–1833
- Capital: Eichstätt
- Common languages: Bavarian
- Religion: Roman Catholicism
- Government: Principality
- Duke of Leuchtenberg
  - 1817-1824: Eugène de Beauharnais (first)
  - 1824-1835: Auguste de Beauharnais (last)
- Historical era: Early Modern Period
  - Established: 1817
  - Disestablished: 1833
- Currency: Bavarian gulden
Preceded by	Succeeded by
Kingdom of Bavaria	Kingdom of Bavaria
- Today part of: Free State of Bavaria

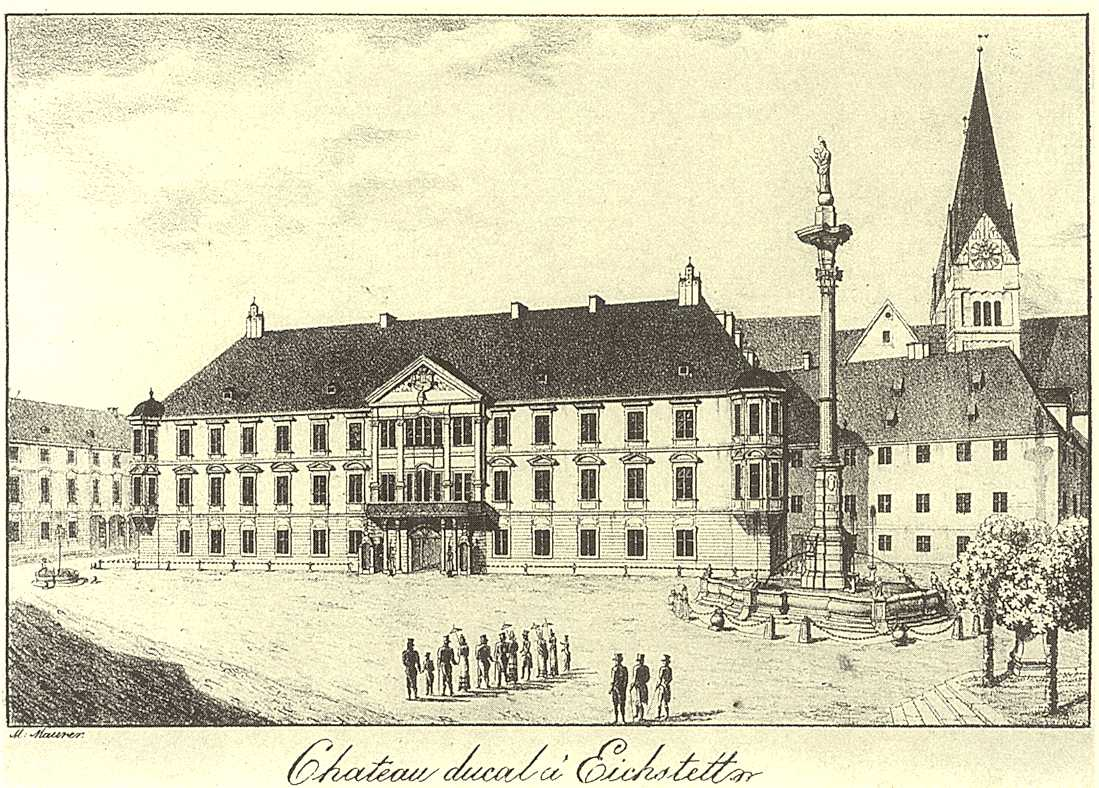
The residence of the princes in Eichstätt

The Principality of Eichstätt was a mediatised principality within the Kingdom of Bavaria that existed between 1817 and 1833 and encompassed an area around Eichstätt with about 24.000 residents. Proprietors of the principality were the Dukes of Leuchtenberg. In 1833 Bavaria rebought the principality and in 1855 finally for three million Gulden the remaining possessions of the Leuchtenberg heirs. The area was, until the Reichsdeputationshauptschluss (1803), part of the Prince-Bishopric of Eichstätt.

Princes:

1. Eugène de Beauharnais (1781–1824), 1817 Bavarian Duke of Leuchtenberg.
2. Auguste de Beauharnais (1810–1835), 2nd Duke of Leuchtenberg since 1824, son of the former.
