= Duchess Therese Petrovna of Oldenburg =

Duchess Therese Petrovna
- Princess Therese Petrovna Romanovskaya
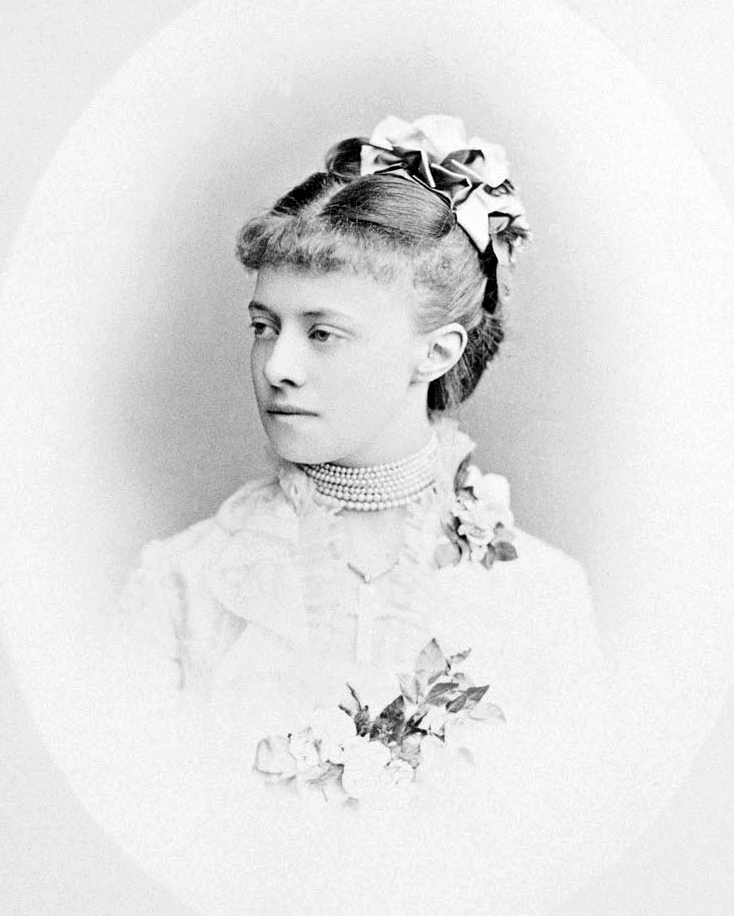
- Therese c. 1880
- Born: 30 March 1852; Saint Petersburg, Russia
- Died: 19 April 1883 (aged 31); Saint Petersburg, Russia
- Spouse: Prince George Maximilianovich Romanovsky, Duke of Leuchtenberg (m. 1879)
- Issue: Prince Alexander Romanovsky, 7th Duke of Leuchtenberg
Names
- German: Therese Friederike Olga
- House: Holstein-Gottorp
- Father: Duke Peter Georgievich of Oldenburg
- Mother: Princess Therese of Nassau-Weilburg

Duchess Therese Wilhelmine Olga Friederike of Oldenburg (30 March 1852 – 19 April 1883) was the youngest daughter of Duke Peter Georgievich of Oldenburg and his wife Princess Therese of Nassau-Weilburg.

== Marriage ==
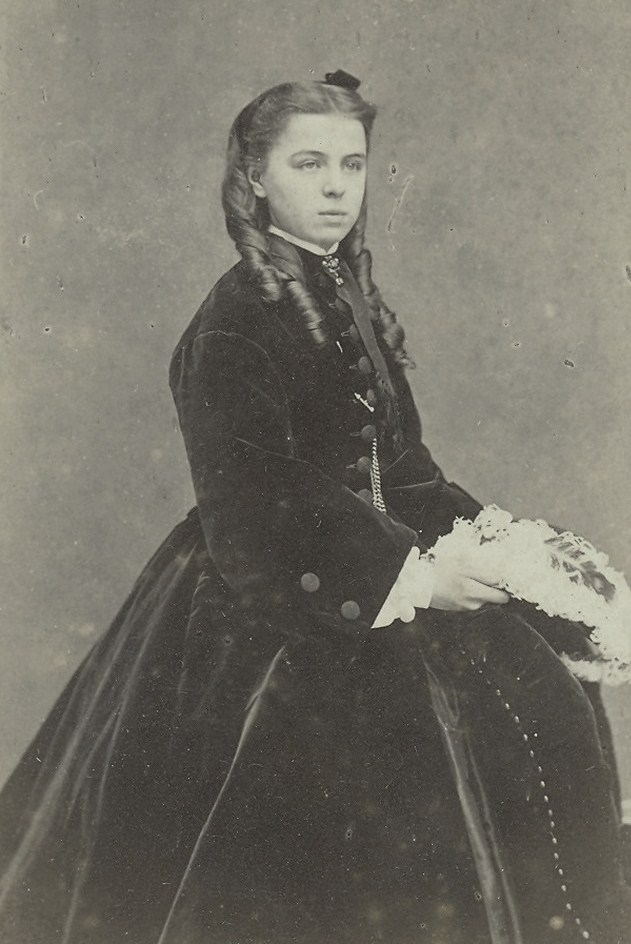
Therese in the 1860s

On 12 May 1879, Therese married Prince George Maximilianovich Romanovsky, youngest son of Maximilian de Beauharnais, 3rd Duke of Leuchtenberg and his wife Grand Duchess Maria Nikolaevna of Russia. Therese's elder brother Duke Alexander Petrovich had been married to George's sister Princess Eugenia Maximilianovna since 1868. Through either the deaths or morganatic marriages of his elder brothers, George was the head of the Russian branch of the House of Beauharnais.

Therese's grandfather had married Grand Duchess Catherine Pavlovna, daughter of Paul I of Russia, and their descendants had been raised in Russia ever since and become completely "Russianized", much like George's own family. Thus despite her German title, Duchess Therese, like her brother Duke Alexander and their father before them, had grown up entirely in Russia. Therese and her siblings were always considered a part of the Russian imperial family.

=== Issue ===
Therese and George had one son, HIH Alexander Georgievich, 7th Duke of Leuchtenberg, who would later feature in many 1909 newspapers after rumors spread that he entered into a morganatic marriage with American Marjorie Gould. In 1912, Alexander was reported to have gained the reluctant consent of Emperor Nicholas to marry the wealthy commoner, Marriane Friedlander Fuld, but only on the condition that the union would be considered unequal, with none of his titles being passed onto his wife or possible children. Despite being the senior descendant of Eugène de Beauharnais (son of Empress Joséphine), Alexander was far from rich, and served as a captain of the Russian Hussars of the guard and as an aide-de-camp to the Emperor. He was, however, the principal heir to his grandfather.

He later morganatically married Nadezhda Caralli in 1917, losing his rights and prerogatives. Later that year, while lodging with Prince Felix Yusupov, Alexander was arrested by Bolshevik authorities, along with four or five prominent members of the monarchical party.

== Later life ==
Various sources attribute George to have been good-looking but a "stupid and rather sorry individual", although these reports were most often in connection with his second wife, Princess Anastasia of Montenegro, who, when arranging her divorce from George, was widely reported to want to do so because she could no longer live with a man of "intolerable stupidity".

In July 1881, the British Reserve Squadron held entertainments on board HMS Hercules, which was stationed in Kronstadt. The luncheon was attended by Therese and her husband, as well as the Russian Emperor and Empress and other important royal Russian and German figures.

=== Death ===
Duchess Therese died on 19 April 1883 in Saint Petersburg. Six years after her death, George remarried to Princess Anastasia of Montenegro.

== Ancestry ==
Ancestors of Duchess Therese Petrovna of Oldenburg

8. Peter I, Grand Duke of Oldenburg
4. Duke George of Oldenburg
9. Duchess Frederica of Württemberg
2. Duke Peter Georgievich of Oldenburg
10. Paul I of Russia
5. Grand Duchess Catherine Pavlovna of Russia
11. Duchess Sophie Dorothea of Württemberg
1. Duchess Therese Petrovna of Oldenburg
12. Frederick William, Prince of Nassau-Weilburg
6. William, Duke of Nassau
13. Burgravine Louise Isabelle of Kirchberg
3. Princess Therese of Nassau-Weilburg
14. Frederick, Duke of Saxe-Altenburg
7. Princess Louise of Saxe-Hildburghausen
15. Duchess Charlotte Georgine of Mecklenburg-Strelitz
