= Beauharnois =

Beauharnois may refer to:

- An alternative spelling of French House of Beauharnais

== Canada ==
=== Members of the House of Beauharnais ===
- Charles de la Boische, Marquis de Beauharnois (1670–1749), Governor General of North-American New France (fr: Nouvelle-France); places carrying his name, including: Beauharnois, Quebec and Fort Beauharnois, Minnesota
- Claude de Beauharnois de Beaumont et de Villechauve (1674–1738), French naval officer
- François de Beauharnois de la Chaussaye, Baron de Beauville (1660s–1746), French naval and colonial administrator in France and in New France (Nouvelle-France)

=== Places ===
- Beauharnois (federal electoral district)
- Beauharnois (Province of Canada electoral district)
- Beauharnois (provincial electoral district)
- Beauharnois, Quebec
- Beauharnois Canal
- Fort Beauharnois
- Beauharnois—Laprairie
- Beauharnois—Salaberry
- Beauharnois-Salaberry Regional County Municipality, Quebec

=== Other ===
- Battle of Beauharnois
- Beauharnois scandal
- HMCS Beauharnois (K540) - Canadian Flower-class corvette
- BHS, an OVH datacenter in the city of Beauharnois, south of Montreal, Canada
- Beauharnois Hydroelectric Power Station

== United States ==
- Fort Beauharnois, Minnesota
