= House of Beauharnais =

French noble family

Beauharnais Leuchtenberg
- Noble family
- Initial Coat of Arms of the Beauharnais family
- Country: France, Sweden, Brazil, Portugal, Germany, Russia
- Founded: 14th century
- Founder: Francis of Beauharnais
- Current head: Nicolas, Duke of Leuchtenberg
- Final ruler: Josephine, Queen of Sweden and Norway
- Titles: List: Queen of Sweden; Queen of Norway; Viceroy of Italy; French prince; Prince of Eichstätt; Duke of Brittany; Prince of Venice; Empress of Brazil; Prince consort of Portugal; Duke of Galliera; Duke of Navarre; Duke of Leuchtenberg; Duke of Santa Cruz; Princess of Bologna; Duchess of Galliera; Duchess of Saint-Leu; Marquis of La Ferté
- Styles: Imperial Highness; Royal Majesty; Serene Highness
- Motto: Autre ne sers (We do not serve others)
- Estates: Château de La Ferté-Beauharnais; Palais Leuchtenberg; Mariinsky Palace

The House of Beauharnais (or House of Leuchtenberg; pronounced [bo.aʁ.nɛ]) is a historic French noble family. It is now headed by the Duke of Leuchtenberg, descendant in male line of Eugène de Beauharnais. Founded in the 14th century, they reside in countries such as France, Sweden, Brazil, Portugal, Germany, and Russia. They had great land, and power within the Brittany area, Beauharnis (or Beautharnois) and into Orléans they became connected to the kingdom, and had many jobs and positions within their ranks by the 16th century.

== History ==
Coat of Arms of the Dukes of Leuchtenberg

Originating in Brittany, the Beauharnais (or Beauharnois) family became established in Orléans in the 14th century. During the Siege of Orléans in 1429, Jehan Beauharnais took part in the city's defence and later witnessed proceedings connected with the rehabilitation of Joan of Arc. Members of the family served the kingdom as soldiers and magistrates and formed alliances in various social and professional circles, including those associated with the study of law in Orléans. By the 16th century, members of the Beauharnais family in Orléans included magistrates, merchants and canons.

From the end of the 16th century to the end of the 17th, the offices of president and of lieutenant général to the bailliage and siège présidial of Orléans were handed down hereditarily through the Beauharnais family. The most eminent of these magistrates was Francis IV de Beauharnais, sieur of la Grillère (at Vouzon, Loir-et-Cher), born in Orléans in 1630, and dying there in 1681.

At the end of the 17th century, the office of lieutenant général du bailliage d'Orléans was ceded to an allied branch, the Curaults. The most eminent of the Beauharnais thus turned to careers in the navy and the colonial administration in the Americas. Another François de Beauharnais (1665–1746) became intendant of New France (i.e. Canada), where a seigneurie was granted to him in 1707. His nephew, Francis V de Beauharnais, was made chef d'escadre des armées royales, then governor of Martinique.

The Beauharnais of Orléans were also great landholders thanks to their many seigneuries in the region. In the 15th century they were seigneurs of la Chaussée (or Miramion), fief of the parish of Saint-Jean-de-Braye, in the suburbs of Orléans. They also had interests at Sologne until the early 16th century, and Guillaume de Beauharnais held the estate of Villechauve, at Sennely. Some years later, the Beauharnais acquiring the neighbouring seigneurie of la Grillère, at Vouzon, with they held until the beginning of the 18th century (when it passed, by the marriage of a female Beauharnais, to the Choiseul-Gouffier family).

On 20 April 1752, Francis V, marquis de Beauharnais (1714–1800), governor of Martinique, maternal great-grandfather of the future Napoleon III of France, bought the seigneurie of La Ferté-Avrain, in Sologne. He was raised to a marquis by letters patent dated July 1764 with the title of La Ferté-Beauharnais, a name the commune still bears (département of Loir-et-Cher).

== Genealogy ==
=== Partial genealogy ===
- William I Beauharnais
  - William II Beauharnais
    - Jean Beauharnais, seigneur de Miramion
      - William III Beauharnais
        - William IV Beauharnais
          - Francis I of Beauharnais, seigneur of Miramion (died 1587)
            - François II de Beauharnais (died 1651), first president of the Présidial d'Orléans in 1598, lieutenant général au bailliage, and Third Estate deputy to the States General of 1614; seigneur of La Grillère at Vouzon, Loir-et-Cher. He married Anne Brachet and had seven children, including:
              - Jean de Beauharnais (1606–1661), maître d'hôtel ordinaire du roi. He married Marie Mallet and had three children, including:
                - François de Beauharnais (1636–1694), écuyer, sieur de La Boische. He married Marguerite Françoise Pivart de Chastullé in 1663 and had 14 children, including:
                  - Charles de la Boische, Marquis de Beauharnois
                  - Claude de Beauharnais (1680–1736), seigneur de Beaumont, capitaine des vaisseaux du roi, and chevalier de Saint-Louis. He married Renée Hardouineau and had two sons:
                    - François de Beauharnais (1714–1800), marquis de La Ferté-Beauharnais from 1764, chef d'escadre des armées royales, and governor of Martinique. He married firstly his cousin Marie-Anne Pivart de Chastullé and secondly Marie-Euphémie Tascher de la Pagerie. He had two children by his first marriage:
                      - François de Beauharnais (1756–1823), marquis de La Ferté-Beauharnais.
                      - Alexandre François Marie de Beauharnais (1760–1794), vicomte de Beauharnais, noble deputy from the bailliage of Blois to the Estates-General of 1789, général en chef of the Armée du Rhin in 1793, and guillotined in 1794. In 1779, he married Marie-Josèphe-Rose Tascher de la Pagerie, later known as Joséphine, and had two children:
                        - Eugène Rose de Beauharnais (1781–1824), viceroy of Italy, prince of Venice, grand duke of Frankfurt, duke of Leuchtenberg, and prince of Eichstätt.
                          - Joséphine Maximilienne Eugénie Napoléone de Beauharnais (1807–1876), duchess of Leuchtenberg and queen of Sweden and Norway.
                            - Charles Louis Eugène Bernadotte (1826–1872), king of Sweden and Norway.
                            - Gustaf Bernadotte (1827–1852), prince of Sweden and duke of Uppland.
                            - Oscar Fredrik Bernadotte (1829–1907), king of Sweden and Norway.
                            - Eugenie Bernadotte (1830–1889), princess of Sweden and Norway.
                            - August Bernadotte (1831–1873), prince of Sweden and Norway and duke of Dalarna.
                          - Eugénie Hortense Auguste de Beauharnais (1808–1847), duchess of Leuchtenberg and princess of Hohenzollern-Hechingen.
                          - Auguste Charles Eugène Napoléon de Beauharnais (1810–1835), duke of Leuchtenberg, prince of Eichstätt, infante of Portugal, and duke of Santa Cruz.
                          - Amélie Auguste Eugénie Napoléone de Beauharnais (1812–1873), duchess of Leuchtenberg and empress of Brazil.
                            - Maria Amélia of Brazil (1831–1853), princess of Brazil.
                          - Théodelinde Louise Eugénie Auguste Napoléone de Beauharnais (1814–1857), duchess of Leuchtenberg, countess of Württemberg, and duchess of Urach.
                          - Caroline Clotilde de Beauharnais (1816–1816).
                          - Maximilien Joseph Eugène Auguste Napoléon de Beauharnais (1817–1852), duke of Leuchtenberg and prince of Eichstätt.
                        - Hortense Eugénie Cécile de Beauharnais (1783–1837), queen of Holland.
                          - Charles Louis Napoléon Bonaparte (1808–1873), emperor of the French.
                    - Claude de Beauharnais (1717–1784), comte des Roches-Baritaud.
                      - Claude de Beauharnais (1756–1819), comte des Roches-Baritaud. He first married Adrienne de Lezay-Marnésia.
                        - Stéphanie de Beauharnais (1789–1860), imperial princess; married Charles, Grand Duke of Baden, in 1806.

=== Members by marriage ===
- Fanny de Beauharnais (1738–1813), French poet and wife of Claude de Beauharnais.
- Joséphine de Beauharnais (1763–1814), empress of the French; wife of Alexandre de Beauharnais and later Napoleon I of France.
- Grand Duchess Maria Nikolaevna of Russia (1819–1876), who married Maximilian de Beauharnais, 3rd Duke of Leuchtenberg, and later Count Grigori Stroganov.

=== Members of the Beauharnois branch ===
- François de Beauharnois de la Chaussaye, Baron de Beauville, grandson of Jean de Beauharnais (1606–1661).
- Charles de la Boische, Marquis de Beauharnois, grandson of Jean de Beauharnais (1606–1661).
- Claude de Beauharnois de Beaumont et de Villechauve, grandson of Jean de Beauharnais (1606–1661).

== Sources ==
- A. Pommier, "Recherches sur les Beauharnais du XVIIe siècle à Orléans", dans Bulletin de la Société historique et archéologique de l'Orléanais, t. XXIII, n° 235 (1937).
- R. Gallon, Les Beauharnais, Orléans, La Galerie des Ventes d'Orléans, 1979.
- Christian Poitou, "Napoléon III et la Sologne", dans La Sologne et son passé, 9, Bulletin du Groupe de Recherches Archéologiques et Historiques de Sologne, t. XIII, n° 2, avril-juin 1991.
- Philippe de Montjoulvent, Les Beauharnais, 1-Les grands ancêtres, Paris, Editions Christian, 2005 (569 p.)
