= Claude de Beauharnais =

Claude de Beauharnais may refer to:

- Claude de Beauharnais (1680–1738)
- Claude de Beauharnais (1717–1784), son of the above
- Claude de Beauharnais (1756–1819), son of the above
