= Ramparts of Quebec City =

Ramparts of Quebec City Fortifications de Québec (French)
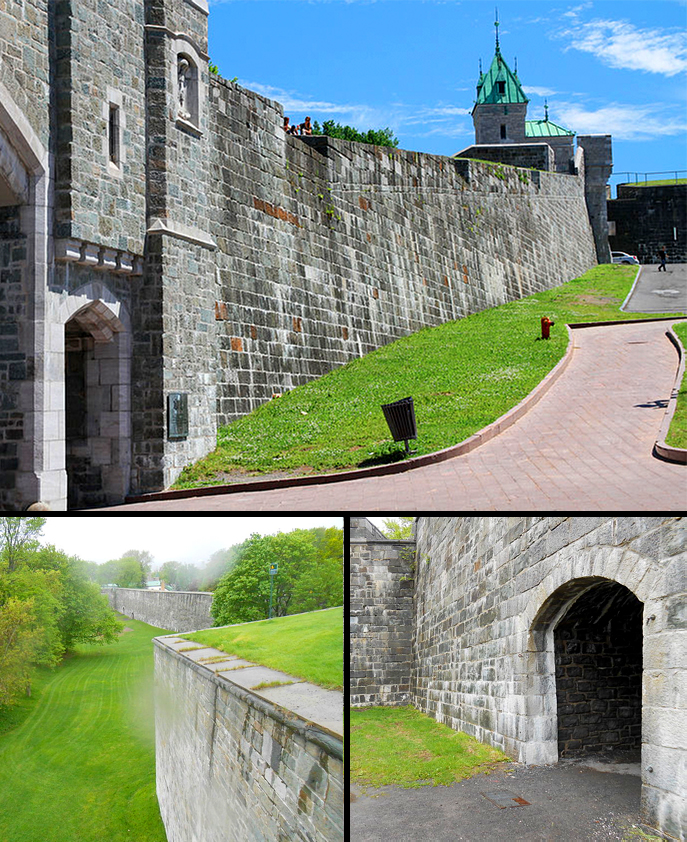
- Multiple views of the ramparts of Quebec
- Interactive map of Ramparts of Quebec City; Fortifications de Québec (French)
- 46.809973°N 71.211609°W
- Type: City wall
- Location: Quebec City, Quebec, Canada

History
- Built: 1690
- Rebuilt: 1745, 1820–1830s (Note: Sections of the ramparts were rebuilt and restored in subsequent years. Two city gates were rebuilt in the 1870s, while the other two gates were rebuilt in the 1930s and the 1980s.)

Site notes
- Architect(s): Gaspard-Joseph Chaussegros de Léry (1745); Gother Mann (1820–1830s)
- Governing body: Parks Canada

National Historic Site of Canada
- Official name: Fortifications of Québec National Historic Site of Canada
- Designated: 25 May 1948

UNESCO World Heritage Site
- Part of: Historic District of Old Québec
- Criteria: cultural: (iv), (vi)

The ramparts of Quebec City (French: Fortifications de Québec) is a city wall that surrounds the western end of Old Quebec's Upper Town in Quebec City, Quebec, Canada. The ramparts date back to the 17th century, with the ramparts having undergone a succession of modifications and improvements throughout their history. The city walls extend 4.6 kilometres (2.9 mi), with the southern portions of the ramparts forming a part of the Citadelle of Quebec.

The ramparts were first built in 1690 in order to defend the Upper Town of Quebec City. In 1745, the walls were rebuilt further west, modelled after designs created by Gaspard-Joseph Chaussegros de Léry. The ramparts withstood several sieges during the mid-18th century, with British forces holding out in the walled city during the French siege of Quebec in 1760, and the American siege of Quebec in 1775. From the 1820s to 1830s, the British expanded and improved the ramparts and the rest of the city's defensive network. However, by the late 19th century, several deteriorating facilities associated with Quebec City's fortifications were demolished, although the primary defences remained.

The city's defence complex, including its ramparts, were designated as the Fortifications of Québec National Historic Site in 1948. In addition to the ramparts, the national historic site also includes the Citadelle and the Lévis Forts. The ramparts, alongside the rest of Old Quebec, were designated as a UNESCO World Heritage Site in 1985; with the area serving as the only intact example of a fortified colonial settlement in North America north of Mexico.

== History ==
Construction of makeshift fortifications for Quebec City began shortly after its settlement by the French in 1608. The initial settlement, the Habitation de Québec, included a trading post, residence and a redoubt with elevated walls. From 1620 to 1665, a series of rudimentary fortifications were built to defend the city.

The city's first real defensive walls were erected shortly after Port Royal fell to the British in 1690. The city walls were completed prior to the Battle of Quebec in 1690. Work on an improved enceinte took place several years later in 1693. The enceinte was built around the city, made up of 11 redoubts joined by palisades. As most of Quebec's Upper Town was situated along the steep cliffs of Cap Diamant, fortifying the western periphery of Upper Town, facing the Plains of Abraham, was given priority.

A succession of modifications and additions were made to the fortifications until 1745. After the Fortress of Louisbourg fell to the British in 1745, the residents of Quebec City went into panic, resulting in François de Beauharnois de la Chaussaye, Baron de Beauville, the Governor General of New France, to order the construction of a new masonry-laden enceinte without approval from France. The new enceinte was modelled after designs from Gaspard-Joseph Chaussegros de Léry, and was built further west than the original enceinte in order to accommodate urban growth in Upper Town.

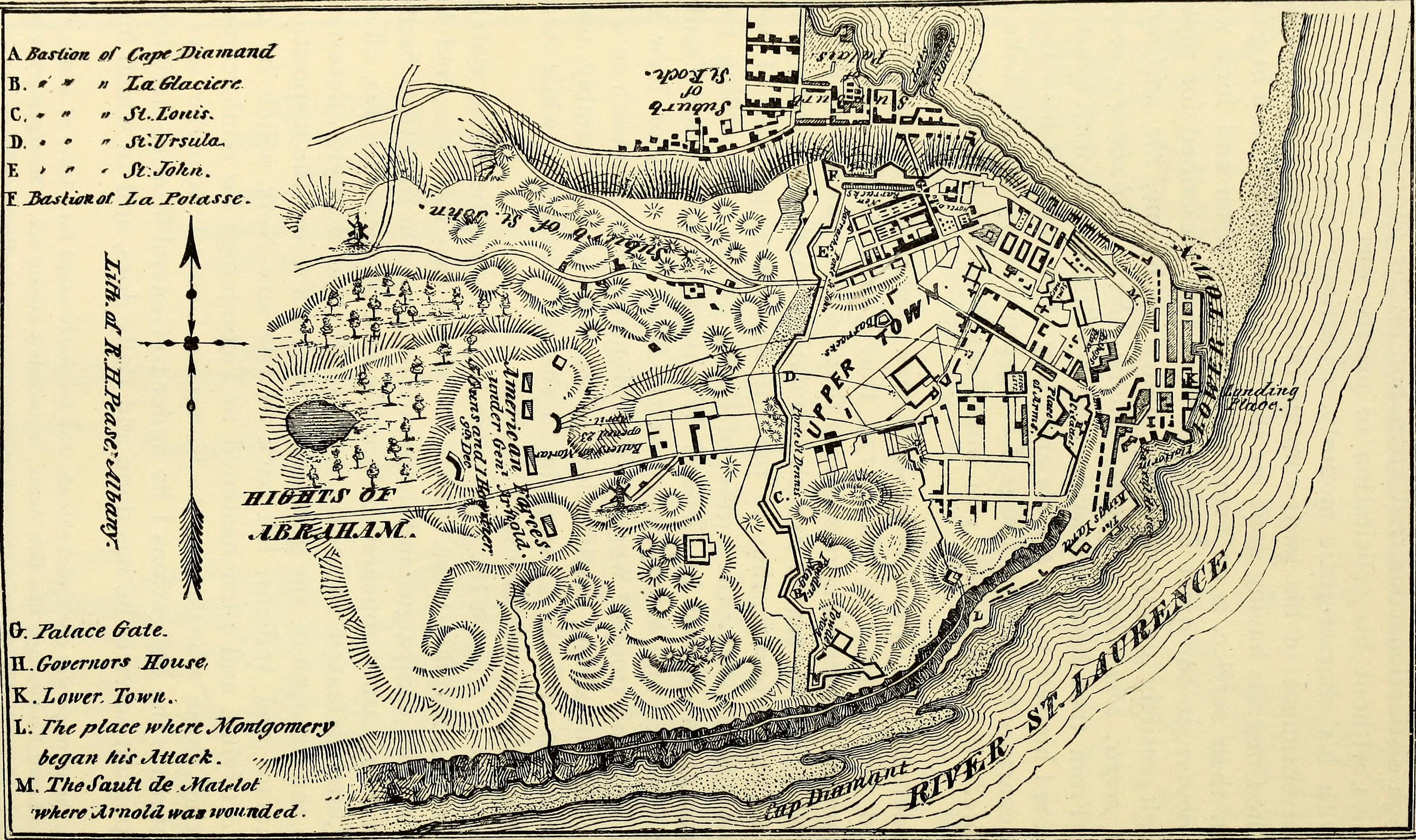
Map of the American siege of Quebec, with the bastions on the fortifications of the city labelled

However, several flaws were evident in the 1745 design, with the rampart's flanks being exposed against several high points further west of the city and its hasty construction in the midst of a panic over a potential attack. The condition of the ramparts were in bad repair by 1759, with French commanders making note of its condition prior to the Battle of the Plains of Abraham. The condition of the ramparts was partly what led General Louis-Joseph de Montcalm to assemble his forces outside the walled city on the Plains of Abraham to meet the British; which resulted in the capitulation of Quebec. The city's ramparts were used by the British forces in the following year, allowing them to hold out against a French siege in 1760 until reinforcements arrived by sea. The ramparts were used again fifteen years later, when soldiers of the British Army and the Canadian militia held off another siege in 1775 by American forces.

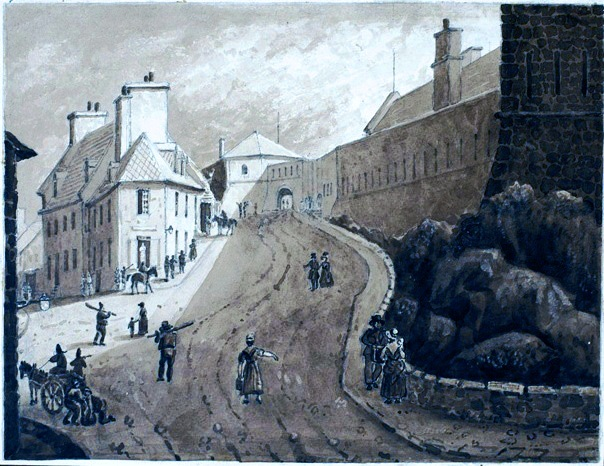
Depiction of the ramparts near Palace Gate, c. 1825

Although British officials in Quebec raised several concerns about improving the city's fortifications, little work was done to the ramparts in the initial decades of British-rule; with the British only making necessary preservation works to the ramparts. The American Revolutionary War sparked a renewed interest in improving the city's defences, with a series of wood and earthworks formed along the redoubt and heights of Cap Diamond; acting as a temporary citadel. New designs that recognized the strategic importance of the 1745 ramparts were later created by Gother Mann. The plans included the extension of the 1745 ramparts along with several outworks added to its walls, a citadel on Cap Diamant, and several defensive works in the Plains of Abraham. Construction based on these designs was started 1820; with most of the plan being realized barring several alterations. Repairs to the existing enceinte and five new powder magazines were also built along the fortifications. Work on the expansion plan was not completed until the late 1830s, with the completion of the Citadelle of Quebec.

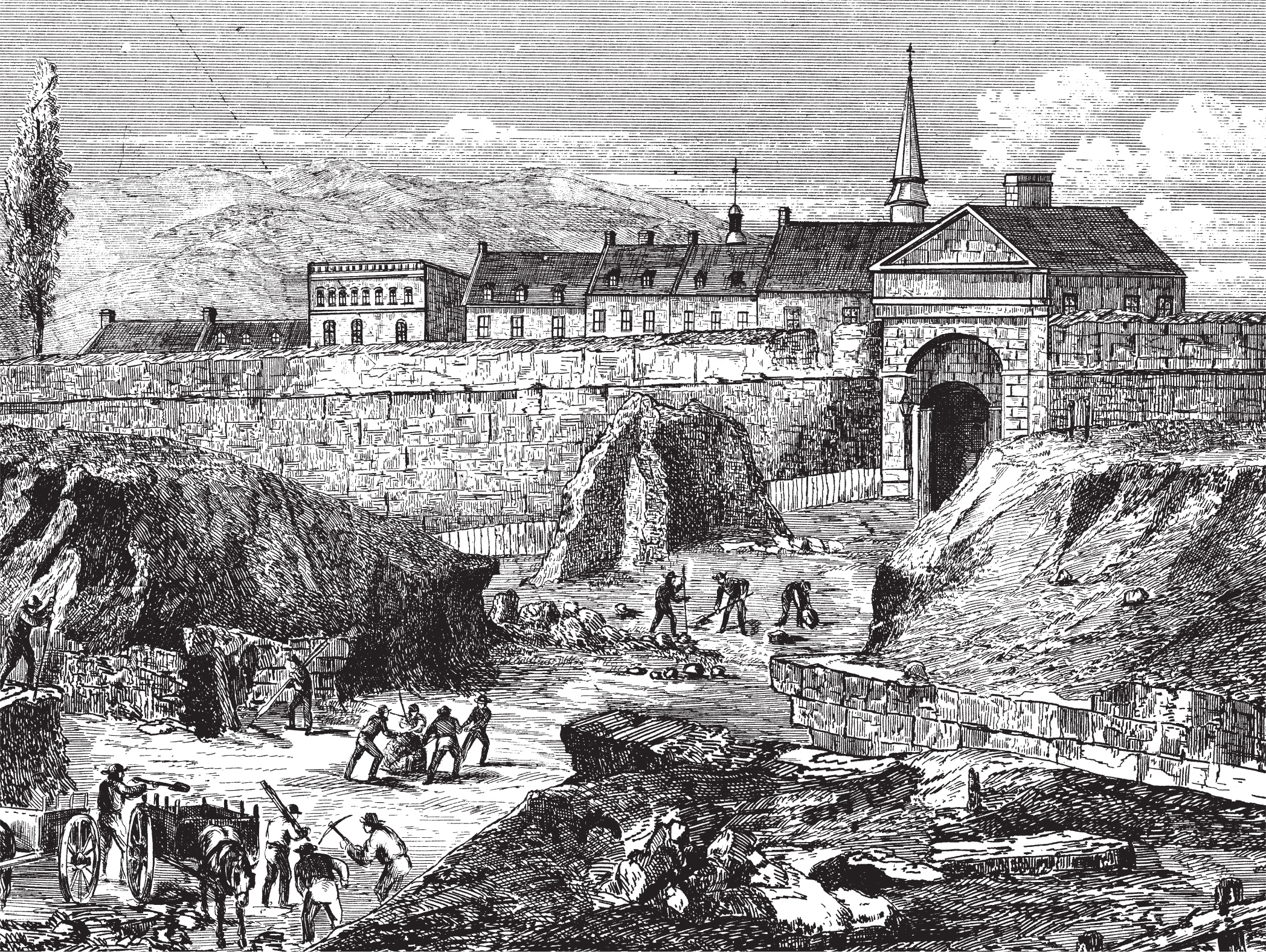
Work taking place for the planned destruction of Saint-Louis Gate in 1871. The gates were later preserved, due to the intervention of the governor general of Canada.

Approximately 300 cannon pieces were placed around the rampart in 1837. During the mid-19th century, the military's interest in maintaining the fortifications often conflicted with the developmental interests of the city. When British forces withdrew from the city in 1871, a number of sites were demolished to make way for new developments, including the old military gates of the ramparts. Several structures of the deteriorated city fortifications were demolished during the late 19th century, although the primary defences of the city remained after the Governor General of Canada, Lord Dufferin, intervened in order to preserve the ramparts.

On 25 May 1948, the ramparts of Quebec City, along with several buildings and structures associated with Quebec's defences were designated as a National Historic Site of Canada. The ramparts, along with the rest of Old Quebec were designated as a UNESCO World Heritage Site in 1985; with Old Quebec being the only intact example of a fortified walled colonial settlement in North America north of Mexico.

== Design and layout ==
Diagram of fortifications in Upper Town, Old Quebec (labels in French). Text in red denotes demolished city gates

The ramparts of Quebec City are situated atop Cap Diamont, a large promontory in the city. The ramparts encircled the western portions of the Upper Town of Old Quebec, with the other sides of the Upper Town protected by steep cliffs with a 90-metre-drop (300 ft). The total length of the ramparts is approximately 4.6 kilometres (2.9 mi). Initially built in the 17th century, the walls were rebuilt in 1745 by the French and improved and extended during the 1820s and 1830s by the British.

Wood and green sandstone quarried from the borough of Sillery make up a significant portion of the materials used to build the fortifications. An underground artillery battery was built into the ramparts during the 1750s, referred to as the flank blockhouse. The underground battery was built to reinforce the portion of the ramparts thought to be the weakest by doubling the available firepower around that point. Its embrasures are presently exposed at the Citadelle. Small openings that pierce the wall allowed people to travel to the outworks when the city gates were closed.

The ramparts of Quebec City form a part of the Fortifications of Québec National Historic Site of Canada, which is made up of several sites associated with the historic defences for the city’s Upper Town and Lower Town; along the north shore of the Saint Lawrence River to the Montmorency River in the borough of Beauport. Other sites related to the national historic site also exist on the south shore of the river in Lévis. These sites include the actual ramparts in addition to other supporting components, such as barracks, guard posts, magazines, Martello towers, and storehouses; such as the Esplanade powder magazine, the powder magazine located on Hôtel-Dieu de Québec's property, the Dauphin redoubt, the Lévis Forts, and the Citadelle of Quebec. In particular, portions of the Citadelle of Quebec are integrated with the rest of the city's ramparts. All the sites date from 1608 to 1871. At one point, the depth of the defensive works surrounding Upper Town was 75-metre-wide (246 ft) when factoring its the city walls, ditches, outworks, and the glacis. However, the depth of this defensive network was later reduced in order to accommodate developments to the west of the city walls.

=== City gates ===
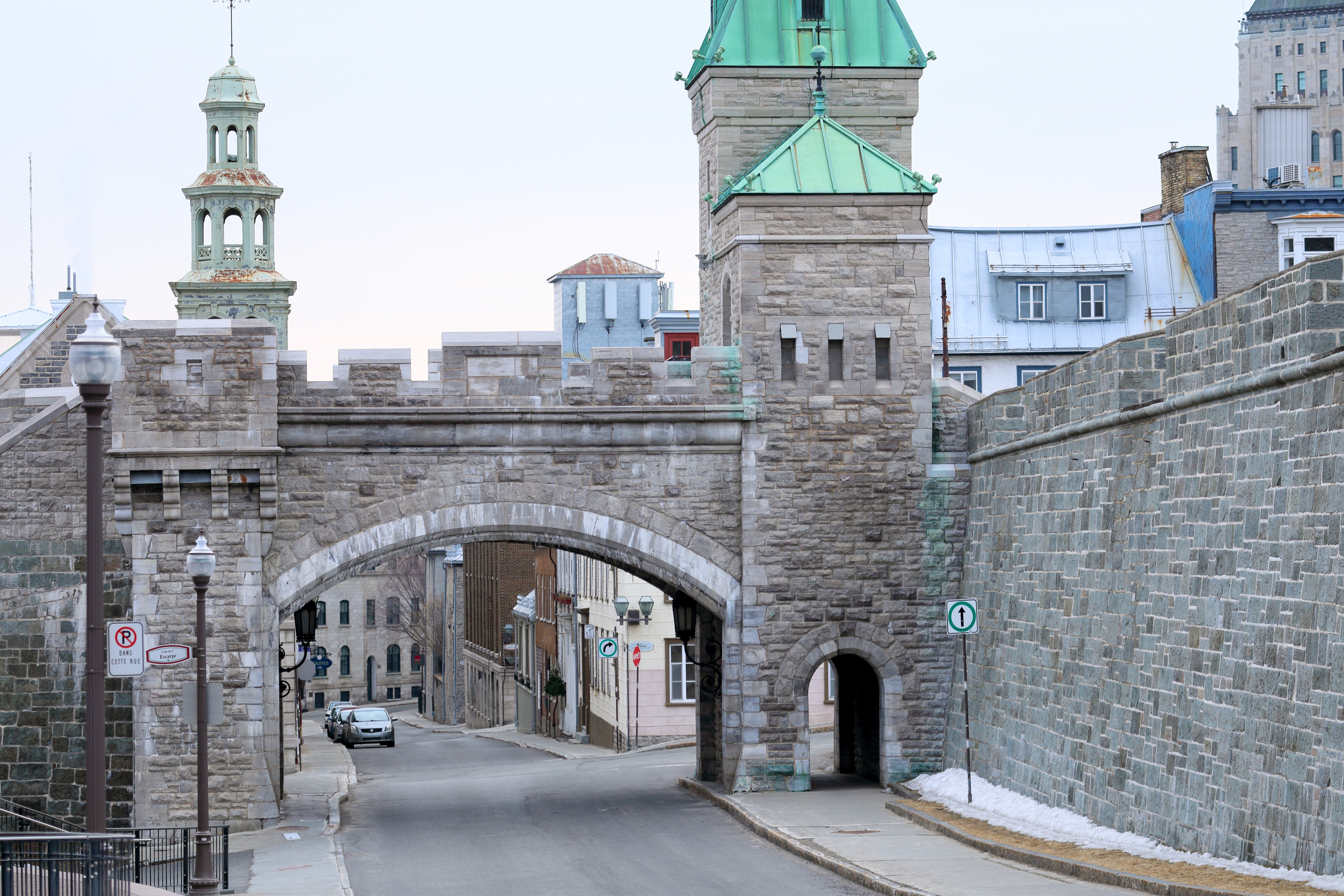
View of Kent Gate, one of the four remaining city gates

There are four main city gates built into the ramparts that provide access to Old Quebec's Upper Town including Kent Gate, Prescott Gate, Saint-Jean Gate, and Saint-Louis Gate. During the mid-18th century, the ramparts had three city gates, although several other gates were later built in the mid-19th centuries. However the demolition of two city gates, Palace Gate and Hope Gate in the 19th century left the ramparts with a total of four city gates. Plans were in place to demolish the Saint-Jean and Saint-Louis gates in 1871, although intervention from Lord Dufferin prevented their demolition.

Kent Gate was erected in 1879 and was named after Queen Victoria's father Prince Edward Augustus, Duke of Kent and Strathearn.

Prescott Gate was a gate whose location dates back to 1797. Prescott Gate was rebuilt twice, in 1871, and again in 1983. The gate is named was named by and after Robert Prescott.

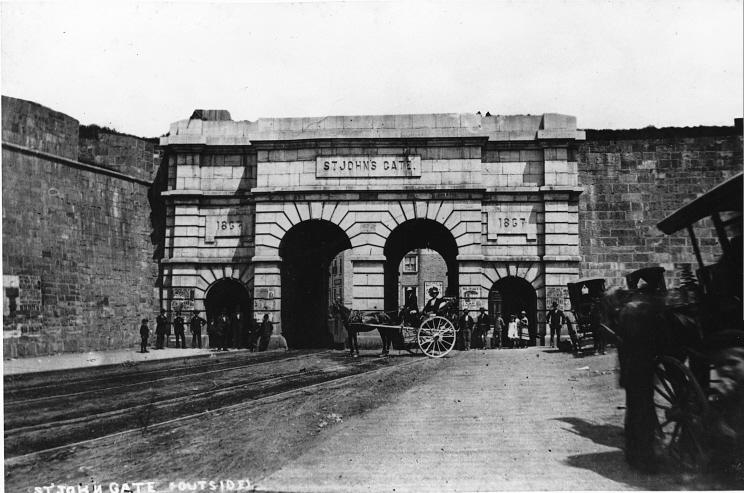
Saint-Jean Gate in 1867 prior to its reconstruction

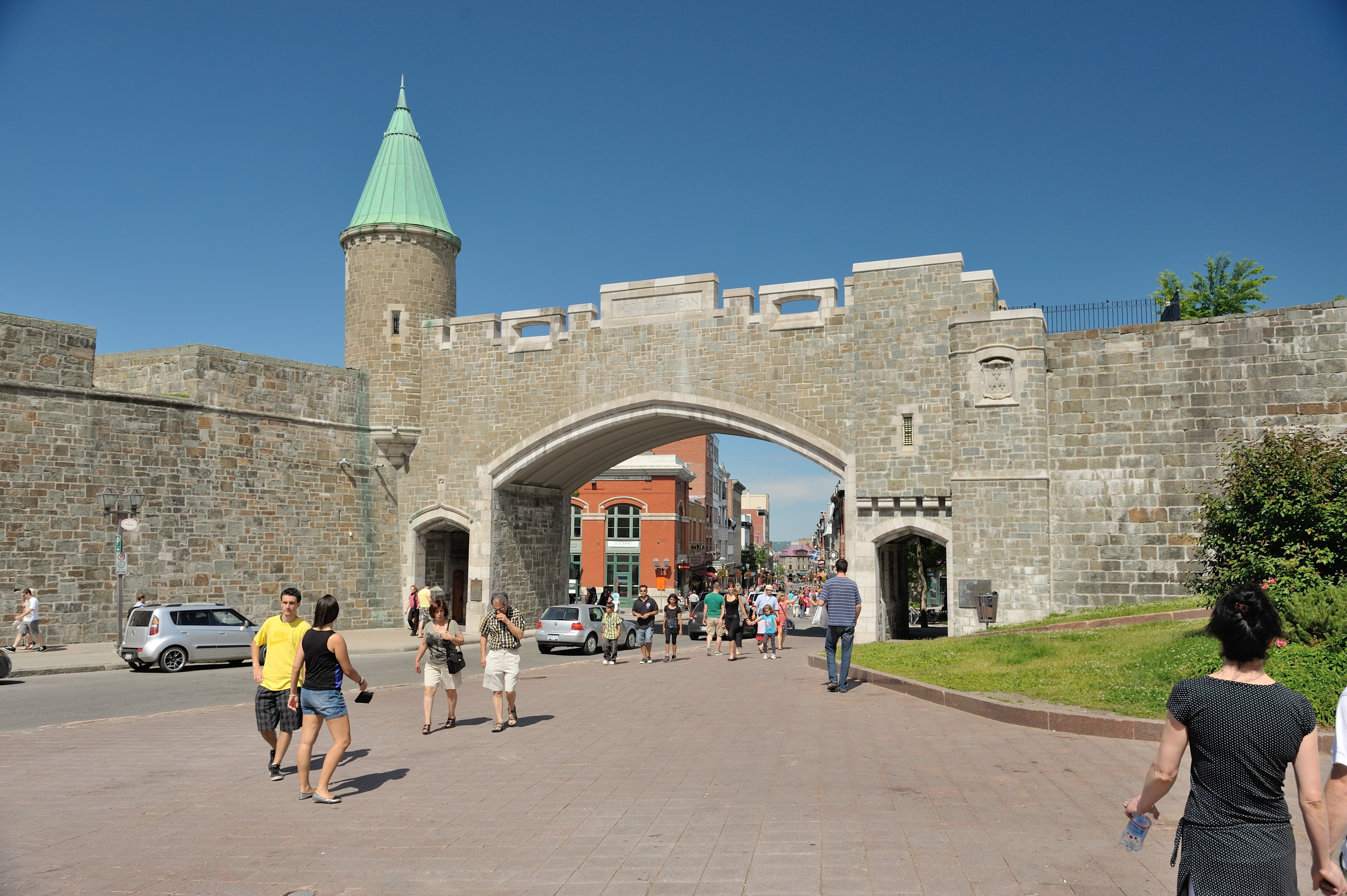
Saint-Jean Gate in 2012 after its reconstruction

Rue St-Jean runs through Saint-Jean Gate, whose present location dates back to 1770. The original location of Saint-Jean Gate was further east on Rue St-Jean and was erected in 1693 where the ramparts were located at that time. The gate was rebuilt at its present location in 1770, although was demolished and rebuilt in 1865. From 1770 to 1871, the gate doors were closed at night, disrupting local trade. The doors were later removed in 1871 permitting the free flow of traffic into the Upper Town on Rue St. Jean. The gates were rebuilt again in 1939, in an effort to make the gate better resemble the design of Kent Gate and Saint-Louis Gate.

Saint-Louis Gate is built on rue Saint-Louis whose location dates to the late 17th century. However, the present gate was built in 1878, to replace the older gate with one more "aesthetically pleasing". Like Saint-Jean Gate, the doors of Saint-Louis Gate were closed at night, disrupting local traffic until they were permanently removed in 1871.

== See also ==
- List of cities with defensive walls
