= Francis IV =

Francis IV may refer to:

- Francis IV of Beauharnais (1600–1681)
- Francis IV, Duke of Modena (1779–1846)
