= François IV de Beauharnais =

French nobleman

Francis IV of Beauharnais
- Born: 2 August 1636; Orléans
- Died: 17 April 1694 (aged 57); Orléans
- Noble family: House of Beauharnais
- Spouse: Marguerite Françoise Pivart de Chastullé
- Father: Jean de Beauharnais
- Mother: Marie Mallet

François IV de Beauharnais (2 August 1636 in Orléans – 17 April 1694 in Orléans), squire, sieur de la Grillère (at Vouzon, Loir-et-Cher), de la Boische, de La Chaussée, de Beaumont and de Beauville, was a French nobleman. His father was Jean de Beauharnais (1606–1661), maître d'Hôtel ordinaire du roi (one of the seven children of Anne Brachet and her husband François II de Beauharnais). His mother was Marie Mallet, and he had 2 siblings.

In 1663 he married Marguerite Françoise de Pyvart de Chastullé - among their 14 children was the politician Claude de Beauharnais (1680–1738), Charles de la Boische, Marquis de Beauharnois and François de Beauharnois de la Chaussaye, Baron de Beauville. Francis IV of Beauharnais was one of the great-grandfathers of the family Eslandoost de Beauville.
