= Claude de Beauharnais (1674–1738) =

French nobleman

- Born: 22 September 1674; Saint-Laurent-des-Orgerils, Orléans, France
- Died: 15 January 1738 (aged 63); La Chaussée (La Chaussaye)
- Noble family: Beauharnais
- Spouse: Renée Hardouineau
- Father: Francois IV de Beauharnais
- Mother: Marie Marguerite-Françoise Puyvart de Chastullé

Claude de Beauharnais (French pronunciation: [klod də boaʁnɛ]; 22 September 1674 – 15 January 1738) was a French nobleman. He was sieur de Beaumont et de Bellechauve, captain des vaisseaux du roi, and a knight of the Order of Saint Louis. He was the son of François IV de Beauharnais (1636–1694), seigneur de La Boische, and Marie Marguerite-Françoise Puyvart de Chastullé.

Claude's brother, François, was intendant of New France from 1702 to 1705. Another brother, Charles, served as Governor of New France from 1726 to 1746.

Claude de Beauharnois never resided in the colony but three times commanded the ships that restocked the troops in New France.

== Marriage and issue ==
In 1713, Claude de Beauharnais married Renée Hardouineau (daughter of Pierre Hardouineau, seigneur de La Laudanière and Renée Le Pays de Beauville). They had two sons:

- François V de Beauharnais (8 February 1714 – 18 June 1800), seigneur de Beaumont et de Bellechauve, baron de Beauville, 1st marquis de la Ferté-Beauharnais.
- Claude de Beauharnais, 1st comte des Roches-Baritaud (1717–1784), who in 1753 married Marie-Anne-Françoise Mouchard (1738–1813) (three children, including Claude de Beauharnais).

Through his son François, Claude is the paternal grandfather of Alexandre de Beauharnais, and therefore the great-grandfather of Eugène and Hortense de Beauharnais.
