= Charles de Tubières de Caylus =

French naval officer

Charles de Tubières de Pastel de Levoy de Grimoire, marquis de Caylus

Governor general of the Windward Islands
- In office 1745 – 12 May 1750
- Preceded by: Jacques-Charles Bochart de Champigny
- Succeeded by: Maximin de Bompart

Personal details
- Born: 1698
- Died: 12 May 1750 (aged 51–52) Saint-Pierre, Martinique
- Occupation: Naval officer

Charles de Tubières de Pastel de Levoy de Grimoire, marquis de Caylus (1698 – 12 May 1750) was a French naval officer who was governor-general of the French Windward Islands from 1745 to 1750. He had dissipated a considerable fortune and was deeply in debt when he took office, and used his power in wartime conditions to establish lucrative illegal arrangements to trade with France's enemies the English and the Dutch. A young nobleman arrived in Martinique in 1748, and for several months used revenues from his family estates on the island to give meals and dances for the elite. After he left it was found that he had been an impostor.

== Family ==
Charles de Tubières de Caylus was born in 1698. He was seigneur of Thubières, Lévis, Postels and Grimoard. His parents were Jean Anne de Tubières-Grimoard de Pestels de Lévis, compte de Caylus (c. 1665–1704), and Marthe Marguerite Hippolyte Le Valois de Villette (1671–1729). He was the nephew of Daniel-Charles-Gabriel de Caylus, bishop of Auxerre. In 1686 his uncle, the marquis de Caylus, married Marie-Marguerite de Villète, niece of Madame de Maintenon. The famous antiquary Anne-Claude-Philippe de Caylus (1692–1765) was his brother.

== Naval career ==
Caylus became a knight of the Order of Malta and infantry colonel. In July 1741 Caylus was capitaine de vaisseau of the Borée (66) and commander of a small French squadron that included the Aquilon (46) and the Flore (26). They were coming from Martinique. On 25 July 1741 off Cap Spartel they met a British force under Captain Curtis Barnett of the Dragon (60) with the Feversham (44) and Folkestone (44). The British asked to be allowed to board to confirm they were not Spanish, and opened fire when they refused. After the ships on both sides had suffered some damage and loss of men, the British sent a boat to the Borée under a flag of truce and discovered the truth. The French did not know whether France and Britain were still at peace, since there had been a risk of war when they left the West Indies, and demanded that Barnet's lieutenant swear that this was the case.

On 16 December 1744 the chevalier de Caylus led a squadron of six vessels into the harbour of Malta during a festival that the French were holding on that island to celebrate the convalescence of the king.

Caylus had all the vices of a fashionable man and had dissipated a considerable fortune. His money had gone on gambling, women and food, and he had borrowed heavily from a Marseille merchant named Roux and other creditors. To recover his fortunes he requested and obtained the governorship general of the Windward Islands. The minister wrongly complained of his predecessor Jacques-Charles Bochart de Champigny^{(fr)}, who perhaps by 1744 no longer had the same energy he had displayed at Saint Lucia against the English when he was only the governor of Martinique, but who was popular with the inhabitants of the islands. Before leaving to take up his governorship Caylus managed to gain a stay in proceedings against him by his creditors due to the state of war.

== Martinique ==
During the War of the Austrian Succession (1740–1748) the marquis de Caylus was made governor and lieutenant-general of the Windward Islands in 1745. He replaced the marquis de Champigny. At the start of 1745 the English attacked Dominica twice, and in the absence of any French naval presence in the Antilles captured all merchant ships. The balance changed when two of the kings frigates, the Amphytrite and the Mégère, came as escort of a convoy of 10-12 merchant ships. Two days later they were followed by the Espérance, Northumberland, Sérieux, Trident, Diamant and Aquilon, which anchored at Fort-Royal, Martinique. Caylus was on the Espérance, and had given passage to a Spanish party including the archbishop of Santo Domingo. Caylus had left Toulon around the start of 1745, touched at Cadiz and anchored at Fort-Royal on 30 April 1745. He was received by de Champigny, who took passage on one of the ship of the squadron.

Caylus was formally recognized as governor general by the troops and the sovereign council in Martinique on 9 and 10 May 1745. Later he was named chef d'escadre. Caylus made his home in Saint-Pierre, Martinique. He was there in 1747 when, to everyone's surprise, Bertrand-François Mahé de La Bourdonnais, governor of the French possessions in India, arrived at Fort-Royal on his way back to France.

Once in office, Caylus looked for ways to profit from his ability to define the rules of privateering and foreign trade. He invested in armaments, which he supplied to corsairs who worked for him and scoured the seas around the island for booty. Through secret agents he established relations with the governors of English islands, and arranged for goods imported from these islands to be sold as booty, and for goods bought in Saint-Pierre by his agents to be sold to the English. Through these means, he profited from the scarcity of goods in Martinique. After France declared war on Holland, Caylus established relations with Heliger, governor of Sint Eustatius, and severed ties with the English. The two governors arranged to make huge profits supplying the English, allies of the Dutch, with products supposedly from the Dutch colonies. They also arranged for French ships to sail under Dutch passports. By 1748 the islanders were suffering from an increasingly tight blockade by the English. Supplies could only be obtained from Curacao and Sint Eustatius. Caylus was blamed for the extortionate prices.

In 1748 a small ship arrived in Martinique from La Rochelle, the Coureur, carrying a passenger who called himself the "comte de Tarnaud" and put on very distinguished airs. The rumour spread that he was Ercole Rinaldo of Este, hereditary prince of Modena, grandson of the Duke of Orléans and brother of the duchess of Penthièvre. Caylus sent a letter asking him to come to Saint Pierre. The young man refused, proclaimed that he was Hercule-Renaud d'Est, and wrote that if the governor wanted to meet him he should come to Fort Royal. The governor started out then changed his mind and returned to Saint Pierre. Soon after the supposed prince came to Saint Pierre and found accommodation with the Jesuits. Later the young man moved to the Dominicans, where he entertained in style.

The news of the Treaty of Aix-la-Chapelle arrived at this time, and the blockade was lifted. The duke of Penthièvre had considerable property on the island, and his agent was persuaded to supply funds to the young man. He was neither extravagant or miserly, but lived very much as a person of his rank would be expected to live, although the islanders began to tire of the expense. Message were sent to Europe to confirm his identity, but the prince left for Portugal before a reply was received. Shortly after, a courier arrived instructing the governor to arrest the stranger. The impostor was at first accepted when he arrived in Portugal, then in Seville, when orders again came for his arrest. He escaped and disappeared forever.

In August 1749 Caylus was deputy for the nobility for the province of Languedoc. The governor of Martinique, André Martin de Pointesable, who had been in France recovering from an illness, returned in 1750. Caylus died on 12 May 1750 in Saint-Pierre, Martinique, aged about 52. He died alone and unexpectedly in the small house named Tricolor he rented on the heights of Saint-Pierre, and was buried with little ceremony. The governor of the island died a few days later.

== Sources ==
- Chambers Journal (1847), "The Prince", The Living Age ..., Living Age Company, Incorporated
- Clowes, William Laird (1897), The royal navy : a history from the earliest times to the present, London: S. Low, Marston & co.
- Dessalles, Adrien (1847), Histoire générale des Antilles ... (in French), Libraire-éditeur
- Garric, Alain, "Charles DE TUBIÉRES DE CAYLUS", Geneanet (in French)
- Renaudot, Théophraste (1766), Gazette de France (in French)
- Marcillac, Sidney Daney de (1846), Histoire de la Martinique: depuis la colonisation jusqu'en 1815 (in French), E. Ruelle
