= Fanny de Beauharnais =

French lady of letters and salon-holder

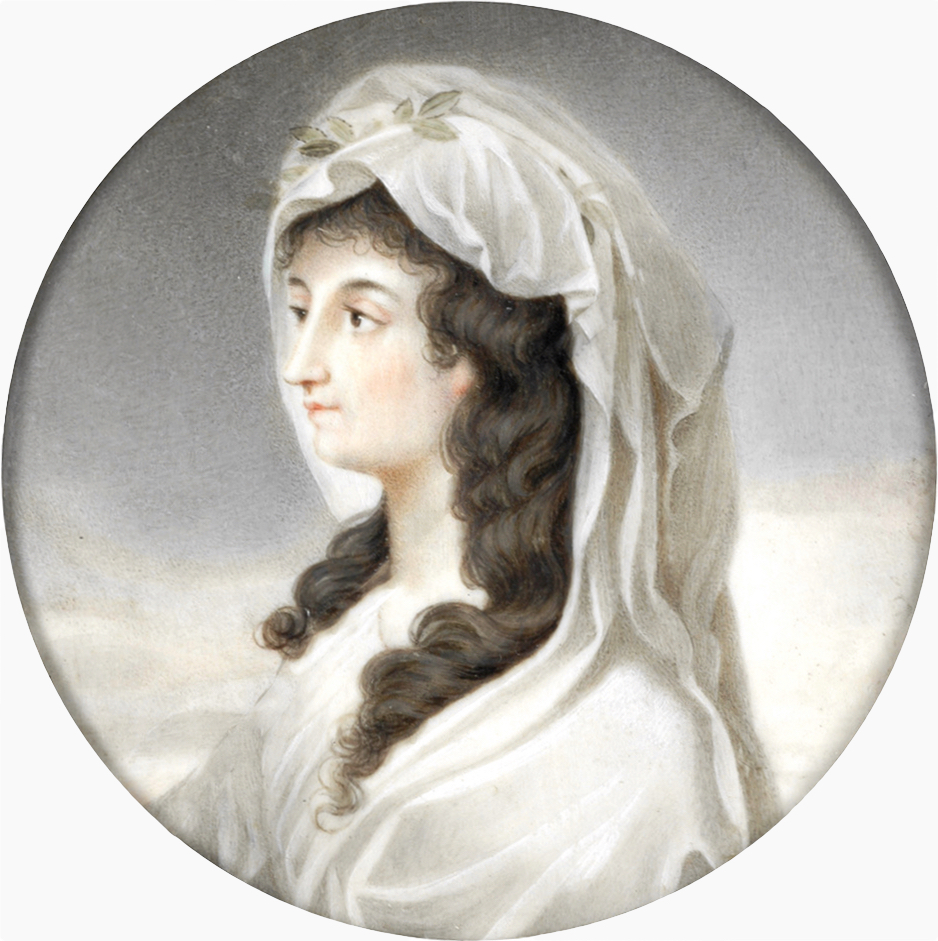
- Miniature portrait of Fanny de Beauharnais by José Othón
- Born: Marie-Anne-Françoise Mouchard de la Garde; 4 October 1737; Paris, France
- Died: 2 July 1813 (aged 75); Paris, France
- Spouse: Claude de Beauharnais
- Father: François-Abraham-Marie Mouchard, Seigneur de la Garde
- Mother: Anne-Louise Lazur

Marie-Anne-Françoise Mouchard de la Garde better known as Fanny de Beauharnais (4 October 1737, Paris – 2 July 1813), was a French lady of letters and salon-holder. She was the mother of French politician Claude de Beauharnais. She was the grandmother of Stéphanie de Beauharnais, Grand Duchess of Baden, and through her she is the ancestor of the former royal families of Romania and Yugoslavia, and the present royal families of Belgium, of Luxembourg and of Monaco.

== Life ==
The daughter François Abraham Mouchard, Seigneur de la Garde (1712-1782), receiver-general of finances in Champagne, and his wife, Anne Louise Lazur (d. 1740). Whilst very young she was married to Comte Claude de Beauharnais, uncle of Alexandre de Beauharnais and of François de Beauharnais. She was godmother to Hortense de Beauharnais, Alexandre's daughter by Marie Josèphe Rose Tascher de la Pagerie, better known to history as Joséphine.

She wrote poetry from her childhood onwards and, after separating from her husband, devoted herself to literature, became friends with literary figures such as Claude Joseph Dorat and Michel de Cubières-Palmézeaux. Her salon became a choice social venue, and she became a member of the Académie des Arcades.

In 1787 she wrote and put on a five-act prose comedy entitled la Fausse inconstance, though it was not a success. In 1790 she was received into the Académie de Lyon.

Her detractors attributed her work to Dorat and other friends of hers. The Marquise de Créquy, in her Souvenirs, adjudged that Lebrun had very rudely and unjustly applied to her an old epigram of Pavillon about Charlotte-Rose de Caumont La Force:

Eglé, belle et poète, a deux petits travers : Elle fait son visage et ne fait pas ses vers.

[Eglé, beautiful and poetic, has two little faults: She makes her face and does not make her verses]

== Marriage and issue ==
On 6 March 1753, she married Claude de Beauharnais and their children were:

- Claude de Beauharnais, 2nd Count des Roches-Baritaud (1756–1819).
- Françoise de Beauharnais (La Rochelle, 7 September 1757 – Sézanne, 24 June 1822), married on 1 May 1778 her first cousin François VI de Beauharnais, 2nd marquis de La Ferté-Beauharnais, 3rd comte des Roches-Baritaud, baron de Beauville, seigneur de Beaumont et de Bellechauve (La Rochelle, 2 August 1756 – Paris, 3 March 1846)
- Anne de Beauharnais (1760–1831)

== Works ==
- Mélanges de poésies fugitives et de prose sans conséquence (Paris, 1772, 2 vol. in-8°)
- Lettres de Stéphanie, historical novel (Paris, 1773, in-8°)
- l’Abailard supposé, novel (Paris, 1780, in-8°)
- l’Île de la Félicité, philosophical poem (1801, in-8°)
- le Voyage de Zizi et d’Azor, poem in 5 books (1811, in-8°).
