= François II de Beauharnais =

French magistrate

François II de Beauharnais (died 1651) was a French magistrate. He was seigneur of La Grillière, the first president to the Présidial of Orléans (1598), lieutenant général to the bailliage of Orléans, and a Third Estate député at the Estates General of 1614.

== Family ==
He was the son of François I de Beauharnais, seigneur de Miramion, and his wife Madeleine Bourdineau.

=== Marriage and issue ===
He married Anne Brachet, (daughter of Antoine Brachet and his wife Jeanne Jamet). They had 7 children, including :

- Jean de Beauharnais, seigneur de La Boische et de La Chaussée.
