= François de Beauharnais (1714–1800) =

French nobleman, soldier, politician, colonial governor and admiral

Francis de Beauharnais
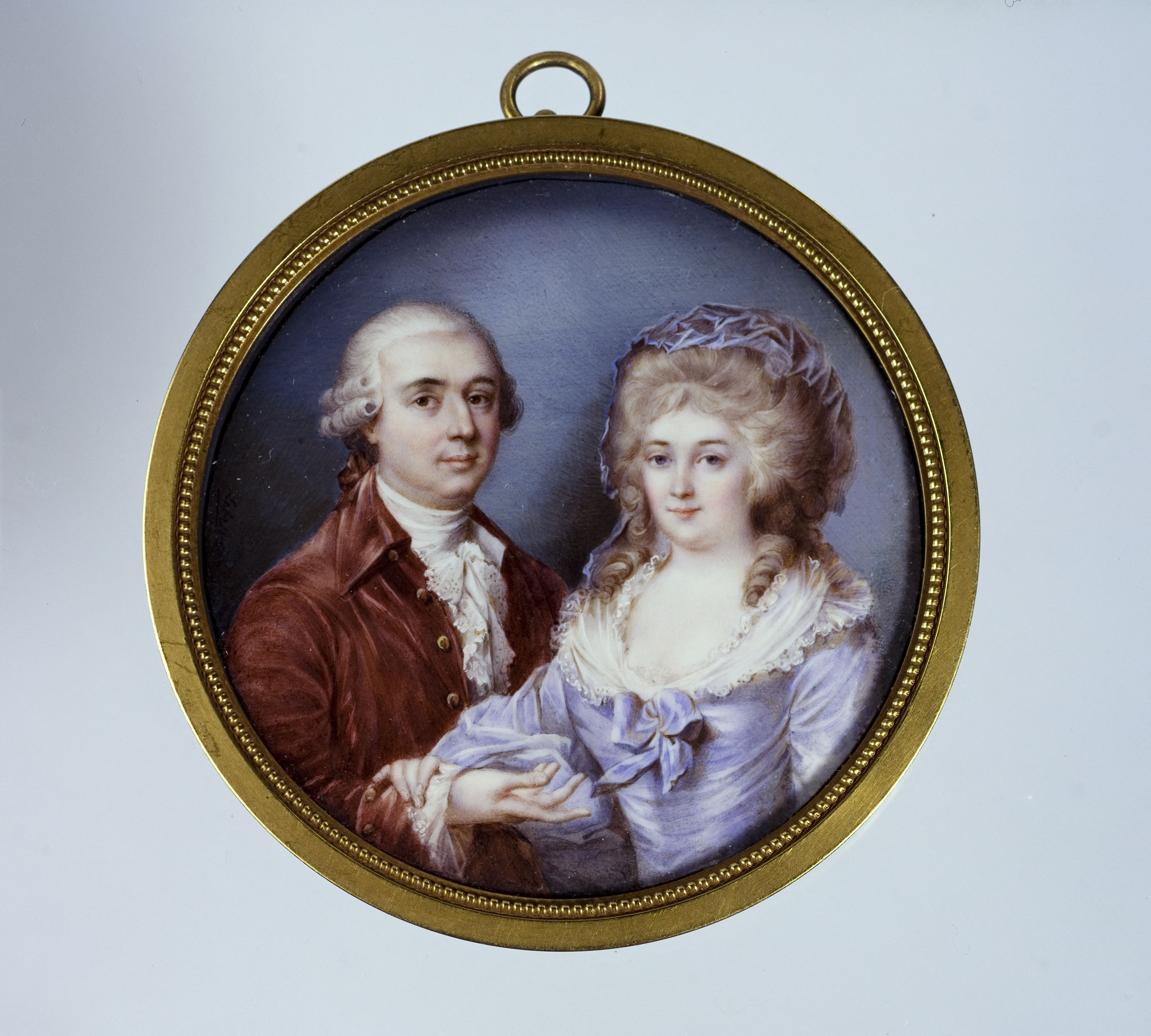
- portrait presumed to be of François de Beauharnais and his wife Marie-Anne-Henriette, attributed to Jacques Lebrun
- Born: 16 January 1714; La Rochelle
- Died: 18 June 1800 (aged 86); Saint-Germain-en-Laye
- Noble family: Beauharnais
- Spouse: Henriette Pyvart de Chastillé
- Father: Claude de Beauharnais
- Mother: Renée Hardouineau

Governor general of the French Antilles
- In office May 1757 – 7 February 1761
- Preceded by: Maximin de Bompart
- Succeeded by: Louis-Charles de La Touche

Governor of Martinique
- In office May 1757 – 7 February 1761
- Preceded by: Alexandre Rouillé de Rocourt
- Succeeded by: Louis-Charles de La Touche

François de Beauharnais, Marquis de La Ferté-Beauharnais (16 January 1714, La Rochelle – 18 June 1800, Saint-Germain-en-Laye) was a prominent French nobleman, whose life spanned military, political and colonial spheres.

He was seigneur de Beaumont et de Bellechauve, baron de Beauville, 1st marquis de la Ferté-Beauharnais, chef d'escadre des armées royales, and governor of the French colony of Martinique. He was the son of Claude de Beauharnais, sieur de Beaumont et de Bellechauve (1674-1738), and Renée Hardouineau de Landanière (1696-1766).

In 1752, he acquired the château of La Ferté-Avrain. In recognition of his service to the crown, King Louis XV elevated his estate to a marquisate, officially naming him Marquis de La Ferté-Beauharnais in July 1764.

== Marriages and issue ==
On 13 September 1751, at Blois, François de Beauharnais married Marie Anne Henriette Françoise Pyvart de Chastullé (17 March 1722 – 5 October 1766). They had three children:

- François de Beauharnais (1752–1753)
- François de Beauharnais (VI) (1756–1846), seigneur de Beaumont et de Bellechauve, baron de Beauville, 3rd comte des Roches-Baritaud, 2nd marquis de la Ferté-Beauharnais
- Alexandre de Beauharnais (1760–1794).

On Henriette's death, François de Beauharnais in 1796 married Marie Euphémie Désirée Tascher de la Pagerie (1739–1803), an aunt of Josephine de Beauharnais.

== Life ==
In 1751, he was made chef d'escadre des vaisseaux du roi, then governor of Martinique. On 20 April 1752, he acquired the château de La Ferté-Avrain, which had recently been rebuilt. In recognition of his services to France, on 7 July 1764 Louis XV promoted him to the status of marquis, allowing him to raise his lands at La Ferté-Avrain into the marquisat. From then on, La Ferté-Avrain was called La Ferté-Beauharnais after him.
