= Maximin de Bompart =

French naval officer and colonial administrator

Maximin de Bompart, Marquis de Bompard

Governor general of the French Antilles
- In office 1750–1757
- Preceded by: Charles de Tubières de Caylus
- Succeeded by: François V de Beauharnais

Governor of Martinique
- In office 1750–1752
- Preceded by: André Martin de Pointesable
- Succeeded by: Alexandre Rouillé de Rocourt

Personal details
- Born: 1698
- Died: 1773 (aged 74–75)
- Occupation: Naval officer

Maximin de Bompart, Marquis de Bompard (1698–1773) was a French naval officer and colonial administrator who served as governor general of the French Antilles between 1750 and 1757. In 1751 he was in correspondence with the King’s lieutenant of Grenada Pierre-Claude Bonvoust d’Aulnay de Prulay regarding de Prulay’s son’s appointment to a position in the Marine guards. In 1759 he led a French naval force attempting to relieve Guadeloupe which was under attack from British forces during the Seven Years' War. However he landed on Guadeloupe too late to save the island which had formally surrendered on 1 May 1759. Reluctantly Bompart was forced to withdraw and acknowledge British occupation of the island.

== See also ==
- France in the Seven Years' War
- Great Britain in the Seven Years' War

== Bibliography ==
- Anderson, Fred Crucible of War, Faber and Faber, 2000
- McLynn, Frank 1759: The Year Britain Became Master of the World, Pimlico, 2005
