= Beauharnois generating station =

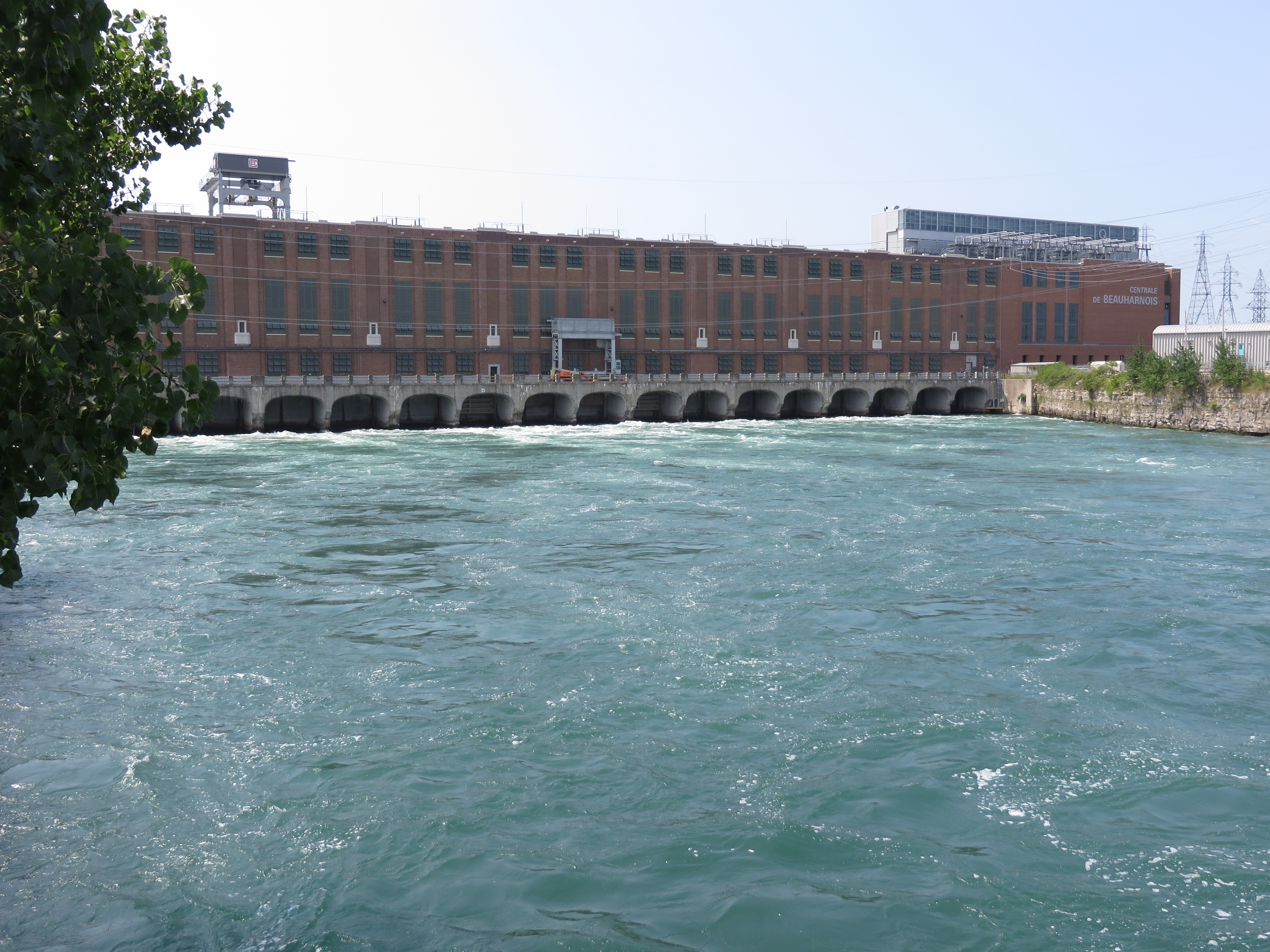
- The Beauharnois generating station in 2014.

- Location within Southern Quebec Location within Canada
- Interactive map of Beauharnois generating station
- Location: Beauharnois, Quebec, Canada
- Coordinates: 45°18′50″N 73°54′32″W
- Construction began: 1930
- Opening date: 1961
- Owner: Hydro-Québec

Dam and spillways
- Type of dam: Gravity dam
- Impounds: Saint Lawrence River

Power Station
- Hydraulic head: 24.39 m (80.02 ft)
- Turbines: 36
- Installed capacity: 1,903 MW

National Historic Site of Canada
- Official name: Beauharnois Power Development National Historic Site of Canada
- Designated: 1990

The Beauharnois generating station is a run-of-the-river hydroelectric power station along the Saint Lawrence Seaway on the Saint Lawrence River, in Quebec, Canada. The station was built in three phases, and comprises 36 turbines, capable of generating up to 1,903 MW of electrical power. Constructions on the facility began in 1930 and was completed in 1961.

The facility was designated a National Historic Site of Canada in 1990.

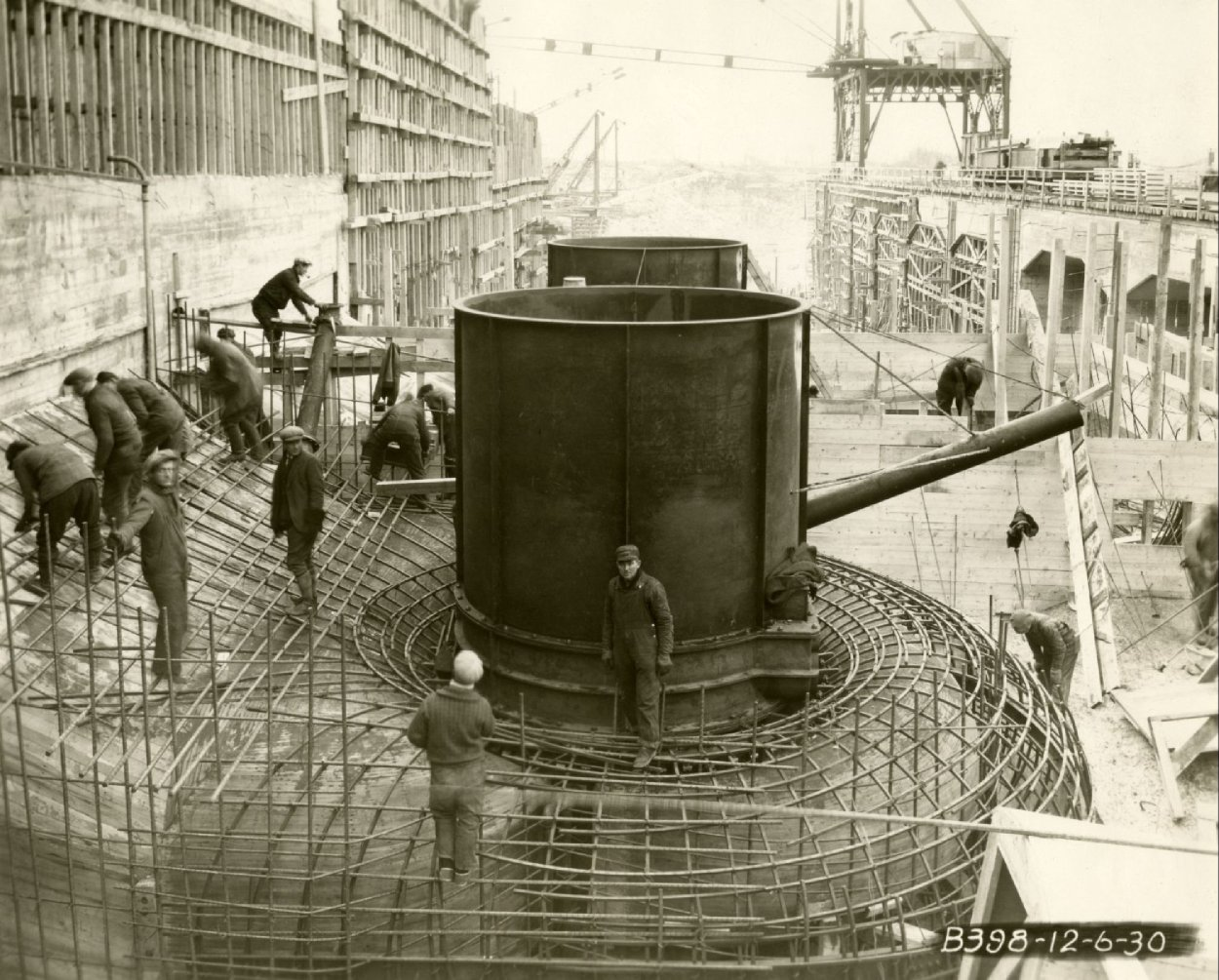
Construction of the first phase in 1930.

== See also ==
- List of largest power stations in Canada
- Reservoirs and dams in Canada
- Beauharnois scandal
- Beauharnois Canal
- Saint Lawrence Seaway
