= La Ferté-Beauharnais =

- Commune
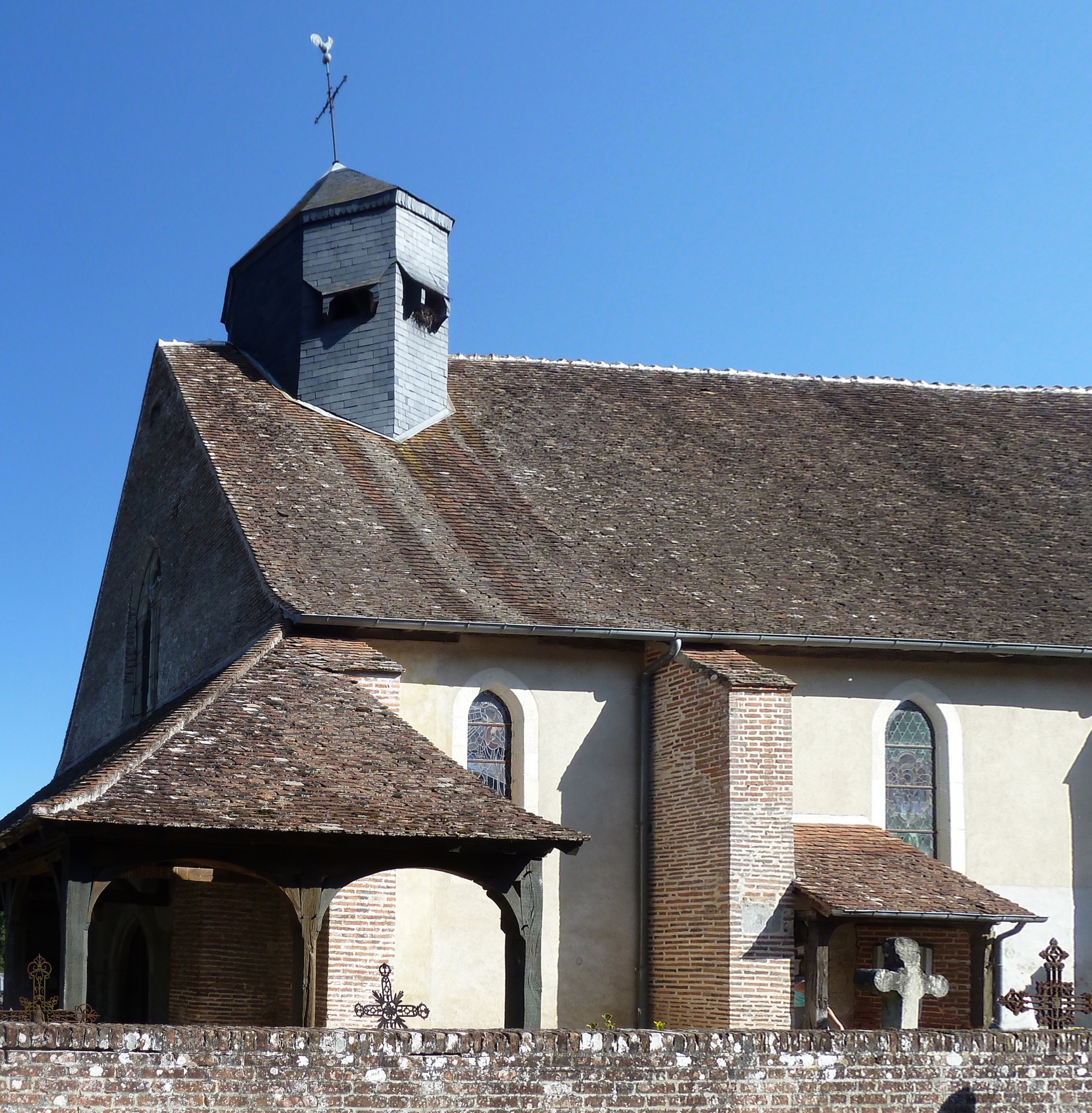

- Coat of arms
- Location of La Ferté-Beauharnais
- Location within France Location within Centre-Val de Loire
- Coordinates: 47°32′33″N 1°51′03″E
- Country: France
- Region: Centre-Val de Loire
- Department: Loir-et-Cher
- Arrondissement: Romorantin-Lanthenay
- Canton: Chambord
- Intercommunality: Sologne des étangs

Government
  - Mayor (2020–2026): Jean-Pierre Guémon
- Area^{1}: 2.42 km^{2} (0.93 sq mi)
- Elevation: 98 m (322 ft)
- Highest elevation: 109 m (358 ft)
- Lowest elevation: 95 m (312 ft)
- Population (2023): 561
  - Density: 232/km^{2} (600/sq mi)
- Time zone: UTC+01:00 (CET)
  - Summer (DST): UTC+02:00 (CEST)
- INSEE/Postal code: 41083 /41210
- ^{1} French Land Register data, which excludes lakes, ponds, glaciers > 1 km^{2} (0.386 sq mi or 247 acres) and river estuaries.

La Ferté-Beauharnais (French pronunciation: [la fɛʁte boaʁnɛ]) is a commune in the Loir-et-Cher department of central France.

== Population ==
Historical population
| Year | Pop. | ±% p.a. |
|---|---|---|
| 1968 | 454 | — |
| 1975 | 392 | −2.08% |
| 1982 | 400 | +0.29% |
| 1990 | 442 | +1.26% |
| 1999 | 463 | +0.52% |
| 2007 | 518 | +1.41% |
| 2012 | 529 | +0.42% |
| 2017 | 525 | −0.15% |
| 2023 | 561 | +1.11% |
Source: INSEE

== See also ==
- Communes of the Loir-et-Cher department
