= Lévis Forts =

Coordinates: 46.814502°N 71.158040°W

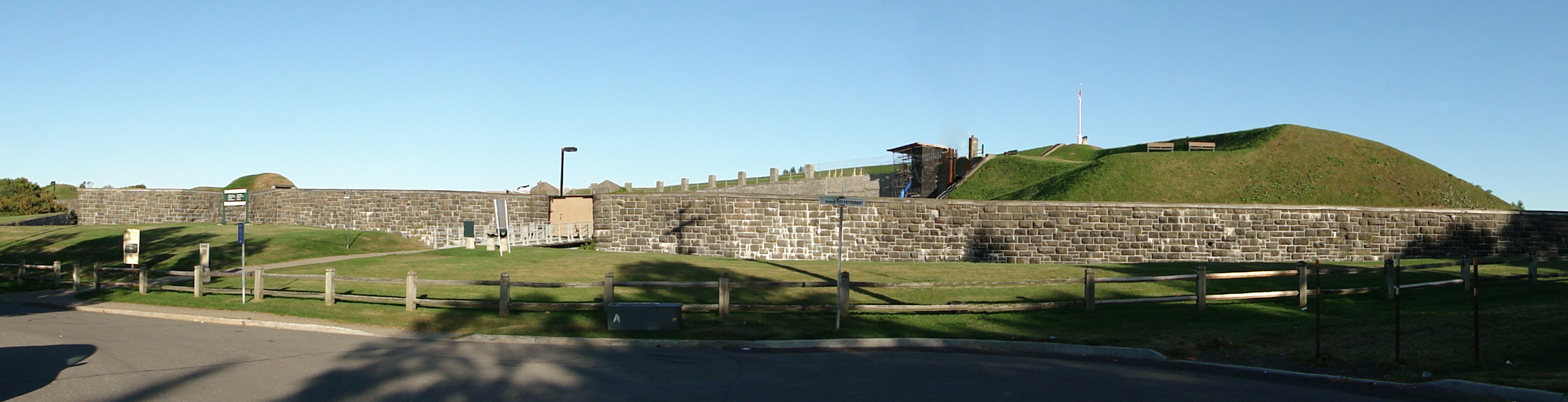
- Established: 1865
- Location: Saint Lawrence River in the Province of Quebec, Canada.
- Type: forts
- Website: www.pc.gc.ca/en/lhn-nhs/qc/levis

National Historic Site of Canada
- Official name: Lévis Forts National Historic Site of Canada
- Designated: 1920

The Lévis Forts was a series of three forts located on the south shore of the Saint Lawrence River in Lévis, Quebec, Canada. The first one was built from 1865 to 1872 under the direction of the Royal Engineers. The construction costs were between £57,600 to £59,762 for each fort.

During the American Civil War, Great Britain remained neutral in the conflict. However, the cotton directly imported from the south of the United States had great importance to the British textile industry. Following the Civil War, the British were apprehensive about a potential American invasion of Canada. The tense political relationship between Austria and Prussia also worried the British about the supply of timber if trade in the Baltic Sea was cut off. Canada was at the time Britain's primary source for timber.

Lieutenant-Colonel William Jervois was sent to the province of Canada to review the fortifications in the colony. He recommended that detached forts be built on Point Lévy, on the south shore of the Saint Lawrence River to guard the approaches to Quebec City, a major port. The original plans recommended five forts, of which three were actually built. None of the forts were ever garrisoned as the fear of American invasion had abated following the signing of the Treaty of Washington in 1871.

== Lévis Forts National Historic Site ==
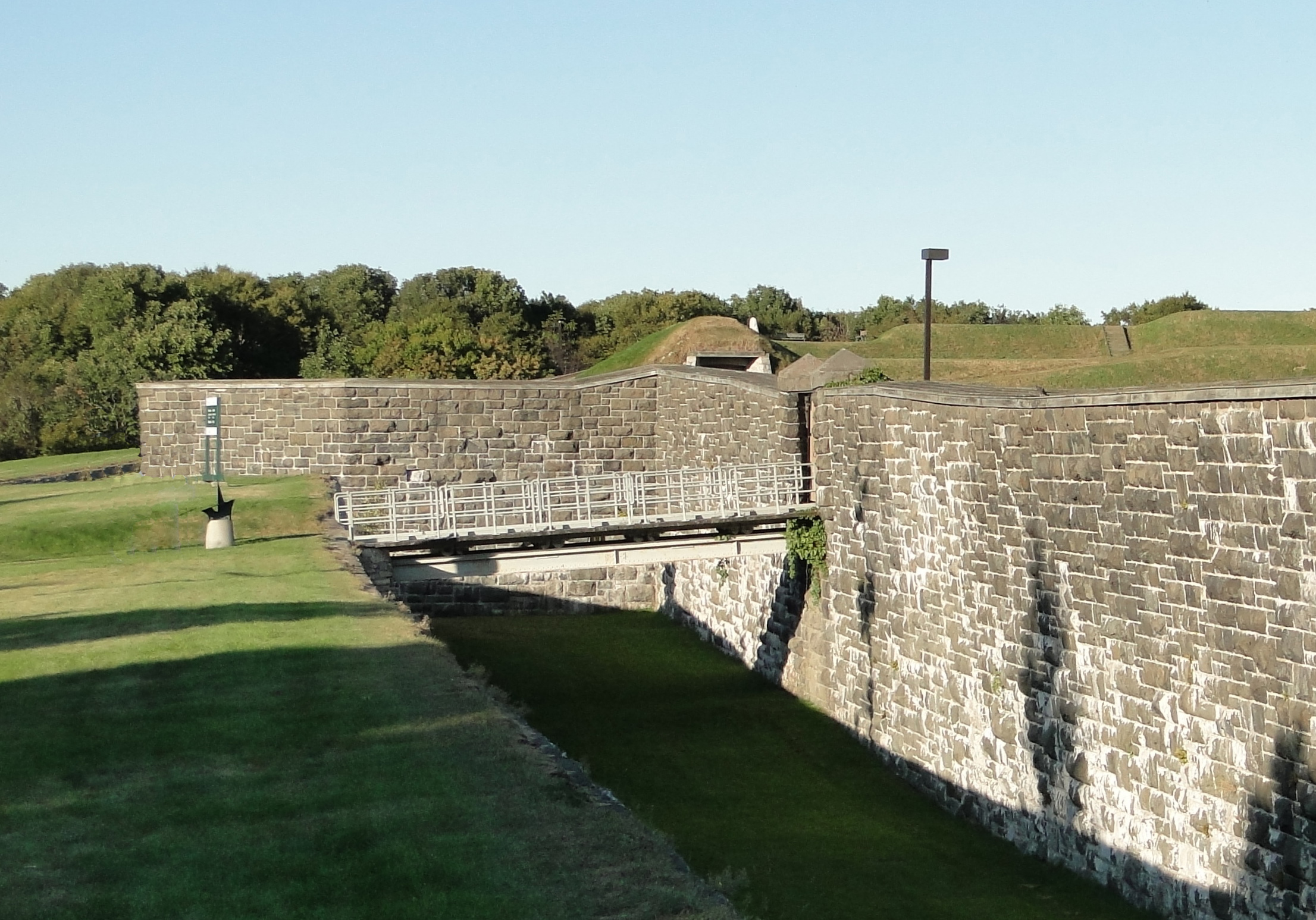
A view of the defensive ditch, wall, and rolling bridge at Fort No. 1, the only preserved fort.

The easternmost of the three forts, Fort No. 1, has been a National Historic Site of Canada since 1920 and underwent restoration in the 1970s. The casemates of the polygonal fort feature exhibits about the history of the site, and include a multimedia presentation, scale models, period illustrations, interactive games, and antique tools and materials. Guided tours are offered of the casemates, tunnels and underground chambers, and visitors can take self-guided tours of the outdoor retractable bridge, terreplein, powder magazines, and caponiers.

== Affiliations ==
The Museum is affiliated with CMA, CHIN, and Digital Museums Canada.
