= Claude de Beauharnais (1717–1784) =

French nobleman

- Born: 16 January 1717; Rochefort
- Died: 25 December 1784 (aged 67); Paris
- Noble family: House of Beauharnais
- Spouse: Marie-Anne-Françoise Mouchard de la Garde
- Father: Claude de Beauharnais
- Mother: Renée Hardouineau de La Laudanière

Claude de Beauharnais (French pronunciation: [klod də boaʁnɛ]; Rochefort, 16 January 1717 – Paris, 25 December 1784) was a French nobleman. He was the second son of Claude de Beauharnais.

== Marriage and issue ==
On 6 March 1753, he married Marie-Anne-Françoise Mouchard de la Garde and their children were:

- Claude de Beauharnais, 2nd Count des Roches-Baritaud (1756–1819).
- Françoise de Beauharnais (La Rochelle, 7 September 1757 – Sézanne, 24 June 1822), married on 1 May 1778 her first cousin François VI de Beauharnais, 2nd marquis de La Ferté-Beauharnais, 3rd comte des Roches-Baritaud, baron de Beauville, seigneur de Beaumont et de Bellechauve (La Rochelle, 2 August 1756 – Paris, 3 March 1846)
- Anne de Beauharnais (1760–1831)
