= Claude de Beauharnais (1756–1819) =

French politician

- Born: 26 September 1756; La Rochelle
- Died: 10 January 1819 (aged 62); Paris
- Known for: Politician
- Spouses: Claudine Françoise Adrienne Gabrielle de Lézay-Marnézia; Sophie Fortin Duplessis
- Children: Albéric Jules Albert; Stéphanie de Beauharnais; Josephine de Beauharnais
- Parent(s): Claude de Beauharnais; Marie-Anne-Françoise Mouchard

Coat of arms of Claude de Beauharnais

Claude de Beauharnais, 2nd count des Roches-Baritaud (French pronunciation: [klod də boaʁnɛ]; 26 September 1756, La Rochelle – 10 January 1819, Paris) was a French politician.

== Life ==
=== Family ===
He was the son of Claude de Beauharnais (1717–1784), 1st comte des Roches-Baritaud (uncle of Alexandre de Beauharnais and of François VI de Beauharnais) and his wife Marie-Anne-Françoise Mouchard de la Garde. His mother held a famous salon in Paris.

He married twice. He first married on 17 June 1786 to Claudine Françoise Adrienne Gabrielle de Lézay-Marnézia (Moutonne, Jura, 5 April 1768 - Saint-Julien-sur-Suran, 9 August 1791), by whom he had two children:

- Albéric Jules Albert de Beauharnais (23 August 1787 – 1791), who died in infancy
- Stéphanie de Beauharnais (28 August 1789 – 29 January 1860), who became the adoptive daughter of Napoleon I, married Karl, Grand Duke of Baden, and died as dowager grand duchess

He remarried in 1799 to Sophie Fortin Duplessis (7 February 1775 – 20 May 1850), and they had one child:

- Joséphine de Beauharnais (11 December 1803 – 14 November 1871)

=== Military career ===
He joined the army early and was a captain in the régiment des gardes françaises at the outbreak of the French Revolution.

=== Political career ===
On 5 pluviôse year XII he was made president of the electoral college of the Vendée département, also becoming a Sénat conservateur on 1 floréal year XII. He was made a member of the Légion d'honneur on the following 25 prairial.

Napoleon I granted him the sénatorerie of Amiens on 16 March 1806. He was made comte de l'Empire on 6 June 1808.

In 1810, he became a member of the conseil d'administration of the Sénat conservateur, a chevalier d'honneur of empress Marie-Louise and grand cross of the ordre de la Fidélité (on 24 February). On 30 June 1811 he became a grand-officer of the Légion d'honneur.

On the Bourbon Restoration, Louis XVIII added to the honours Claude had received under Napoleon, including Pair de France on 4 June 1814. In the trial of Marshal Ney, Claude voted for his death.

== Sources ==
- Dictionnaire Bouillet
- "Claude de Beauharnais", in Adolphe Robert, Edgar Bourloton and Gaston Cougny, Dictionnaire des parlementaires français (1789–1891), XIXe siècle
- Genealogy of the Beauharnais dynasty
