= François VI de Beauharnais =

French nobleman

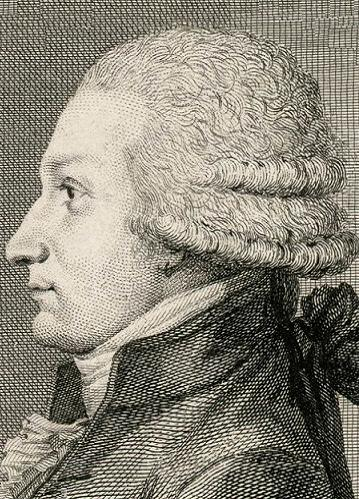
François de Beauharnais

François VI de Beauharnais, 2nd marquis de La Ferté-Beauharnais (also 3rd comte des Roches-Baritaud, baron de Beauville, seigneur de Beaumont et de Bellechauve; 12 August 1756, La Rochelle – 3 March 1846, Paris) was a French nobleman.

== Family ==
He was the son of François V de Beauharnais, seigneur de Beaumont et de Bellechauve, baron de Beauville, 1st marquis de La Ferté-Beauharnais, and of his wife Marie Anne Henriette Françoise Pyvart de Chastullé. This made him the elder brother of Alexandre de Beauharnais and the uncle of Napoleon's stepchildren Eugène and Hortense.

== Life ==
He represented the nobility of États Généraux of 1789, but later emigrated to join Condé's army as a major general. However, he later rallied to the First French Empire, which sent him on various diplomatic missions. He was French Ambassador to the Kingdom of Etruria (1805) and to Spain (1806-1808).

In Spain, he was involved in the intrigues leading up to the overthrow of Manuel Godoy (17–19 March 1808), the French invasion (2 May 1808) and the Abdications of Bayonne (5-7 May 1808).
Napoleon was not satisfied with the close ties between Beauharnais and Ferdinand VII, and replaced him as ambassador by Antoine de Laforêt. Recalled to France, he was exiled him to his estate in Sologne.

The Marquis de Beauharnais remained there until 1814. He then returned to Paris, but received no favors from the Restoration, and died at the age of 89, blind and forgotten.

== Marriages and issue ==
On 1 May 1778 François de Beauharnais married his first cousin Françoise de Beauharnais (La Rochelle, 7 September 1757 – Sézanne, 24 June 1822), daughter of Claude de Beauharnais, 2nd comte des Roches-Baritaud, and wife Marie-Anne-Françoise Mouchard. They divorced in 1793, after having four children:

- Adélaïde de Beauharnais (1779–1780)
- Françoise de Beauharnais (1780–1780)
- Émilie de Beauharnais (1781–1855), court official, married on 22 April 1798 comte Antoine Marie Chamans de La Valette (1769–1830), whom she would save from execution in 1815.
- Amédée de Beauharnais (1782–1784)

On 11 October 1802, François de Beauharnais married Louise von Cohausen (1775–1822), daughter of Karl Caspar Hubertus, Reichsritter von Cohausen, and of Elisabeth Umbscheiden von Ehrencron. They had two daughters:

- Hortense de Beauharnais (1812–1851), married in 1840 comte Richard de Querelles (1808–1846). On his death, she married in 1848 senator Armand Laity (1812–1899)
- Augusta de Beauharnais (1813–1831)
