= Vouzon =

- Commune
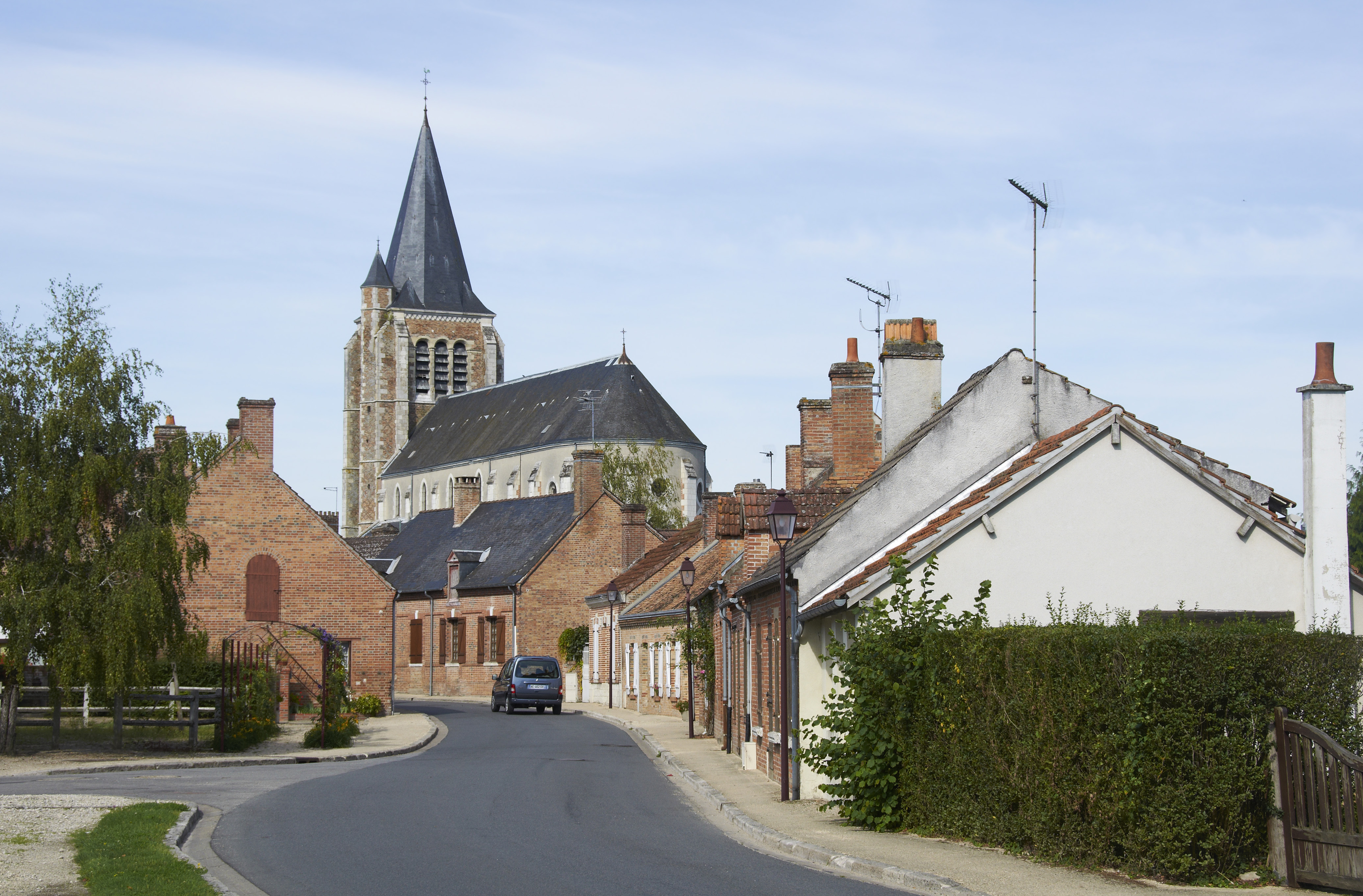
- Saint-Pierre church
- Location of Vouzon
- Location within France Location within Centre-Val de Loire
- Coordinates: 47°38′48″N 2°03′33″E
- Country: France
- Region: Centre-Val de Loire
- Department: Loir-et-Cher
- Arrondissement: Romorantin-Lanthenay
- Canton: La Sologne
- Intercommunality: Cœur de Sologne

Government
  - Mayor (2020–2026): Jean François Lahaye
- Area^{1}: 78.25 km^{2} (30.21 sq mi)
- Elevation: 140 m (460 ft)
- Highest elevation: 147 m (482 ft)
- Lowest elevation: 108 m (354 ft)
- Population (2023): 1,414
  - Density: 18.07/km^{2} (46.80/sq mi)
- Time zone: UTC+01:00 (CET)
  - Summer (DST): UTC+02:00 (CEST)
- INSEE/Postal code: 41296 /41600
- ^{1} French Land Register data, which excludes lakes, ponds, glaciers > 1 km^{2} (0.386 sq mi or 247 acres) and river estuaries.

Vouzon (French pronunciation: [vuzɔ̃]) is a commune in the Loir-et-Cher department in central France.

== Population ==
Historical population
Year	Pop.	±% p.a.
1968	1,051	—
1975	1,044	−0.10%
1982	1,107	+0.84%
1990	1,008	−1.16%
1999	1,060	+0.56%
2007	1,452	+4.01%
2012	1,500	+0.65%
2017	1,483	−0.23%
2023	1,414	−0.79%
Source: INSEE

== See also ==
- Communes of the Loir-et-Cher department
