= Presidial court =

French judicial authorities, 1551–1790

The presidial courts (French: présidiaux; singular présidial) were judicial courts of the Kingdom of France set up in January 1551 by Henry II of France with jurisdiction between the parlements and the bailiwicks. They were suppressed by a decree of the National Constituent Assembly in 1790.
