= François de Beauharnois de la Chaussaye, Baron de Beauville =

French naval and colonial administrator

François de Beauharnois de la Chaussaye, Baron de Beauville (bap 19 September 1665 / 1668 – 8 or 9 October 1746 in La Chaussée, near Orléans) was a French naval and colonial administrator in France itself and in New France, and a member of the House of Beauharnais.

== Family ==
François de Beauharnois was the son of François IV de Beauharnais, lawyer in the Parlement (who was also a lieutenant général at the siege of Orléans and a chevalier de Saint-Louis), a grandson of a premier maître d’hôtel ordinaire du roi (1652) and great-grandson of an Orléans merchant known as "one of the city's richest citizens". François's brothers included Charles de Beauharnois de la Boische, Marquis de Beauharnois (who became Governor General of New France in 1726) and Claude de Beauharnois de Beaumont et de Villechauve (a French naval officer who three times commanded the ships that restocked the troops in New France)

By a marriage between a female Beauharnois and a male from the Phélypeaux family, he also found himself a cousin of chancellor and Secretary of State of the Navy Louis Phélypeaux de Pontchartrain. Pontchartrain's son, Jérôme Phélypeaux de Pontchartrain, made François his protégé and between 1706 and 1710 sought a beneficial marriage alliance for him, in the end marrying him Anne, daughter of the sieur Des Gretz, the rich exempt of the Paris police.

== Life ==
François's career was considerably accelerated by Jérôme's ministerial favour - he became écrivain principal straightaway on 18 April 1691 at Toulon and on 1 April the following year received his commission as commissaire ordinaire, serving in that role at Toulon then Rochefort, Le Havre and Brest until 1702. The creation of "charges vénales" marked the de facto suppression of "commissions ordinaires" and Beauharnois thus left the service.

To avoid François having to pay for the purchase of a commission, and to gain experience for his further career progression in France, Jérôme Pontchartrain made François intendant of New France on the recall of Jean Bochart de Champigny, leaving from Le Havre and arriving in Quebec in 1702. As Jérôme's protégé, he was fairly free to make decisions that might be counter to the wishes of the governor, Philippe de Rigaud Vaudreuil who arrived in 1703. At this time the only real business of New France was the fur trade. However, the death of Antoine-François Phélypeaux d'Herbault on 10 October 1704 after the Battle of Vélez-Málaga (August 1704) freed up the position of intendant of the navy (intendant des armées navales), which Jérôme (as Secretary of State of the Navy) then assigned to François. Thus, after a three-year stay, François left Canada in December 1705 and took up the new role on 1 January 1706.

On 1 January 1710, Beauharnois became intendant des classes following the reforms of Pierre Arnoul but he had little time to exercise his new functions - the death of Michel Bégon on 13 March 1710 left the intendances of Rochefort and of the généralité of La Rochelle vacant. Beauharnois took up them both on 24 March 1710, but in 1715 had to abandon that of La Rochelle on the Regent's orders, under the pretext that he wasn't the maître des requêtes (Beauharnois was nevertheless offered the chance to buy that généralité, but refused). Following pressure on Maurepas, Beauharnois was also dismissed from the intendance of Rochefort and was made intendant of the navy for a second time on 1 April 1739.

François de Beauharnois thus retired to his lands at Boëche, the old name of the seigneurie of La Chaussée (or la Chaussaye), located in the faubourgs of Orléans, and died there on 9 October 1746.

== Properties in France and Canada ==
Besides his lands near Orléans, Beauharnois profited from his brief time in New France to procure the Banville (or Beauville or Bauville) estate there, located in Acadia. The king gave him, by a brevet of 2 April 1707, the land of Port-Maltais (river comprising four places of the bank, two in the depths, with the adjacent islands). On 25 June 1707, by letters patent, this land was formed into the barony of Banville.

At the end of his life, Beauharnois enjoyed several pensions which totalled an annual income of 21,200 livres. His will left his property to two nephews, sons of his younger brother Beauharnois de Beaumont. The older of the two, the marquis de Beauharnois, lieutenant général des armées navales, broke the will by dividing the inheritance between all the nephews and nieces, including Michel Bégon fils, premier commis du bureau des Fonds.

The family Eslandoost de Beauville is the last one of the heirs of François de Beauharnois de la Chaussaye to bear his name.

== Heraldry ==
On the establishment of the Armorial général de France by Pierre d'Hozier, François de Beauharnois arms were registered on 23 December 1699, at its Brest office, as : d’argent, à une fasce de sable, accompagnée de trois merlettes de même, rangées en chef.

== Bibliography ==
- Christian Frostin, « La famille ministérielle des Phélypeaux, esquisse d’un profil Pontchartrain, XVIe-XVIIIes » in Annales de Bretagne, n° 1, 1979, pp. 117–140
- Régis Roy, Les intendants de la Nouvelle-France, Mémoire de la Société Royale du Canada, 1903
- Michel Vergé-Franceschi, Les officiers généraux de la marine royale : 1715-1774. Origines, conditions, services, Paris, 7 vol., Librairie de l’Inde, 1990, tome V, pp. 2115–2145
- Michel Vergé-Franceschi, Dictionnaire d’histoire maritime, Paris, 2 vol., Robert Laffont, coll. Bouquins, 2002, tome I, p. 191 et tome II, p. 1 163.
