= Charles de la Boische, Marquis de Beauharnois =

French Naval officer

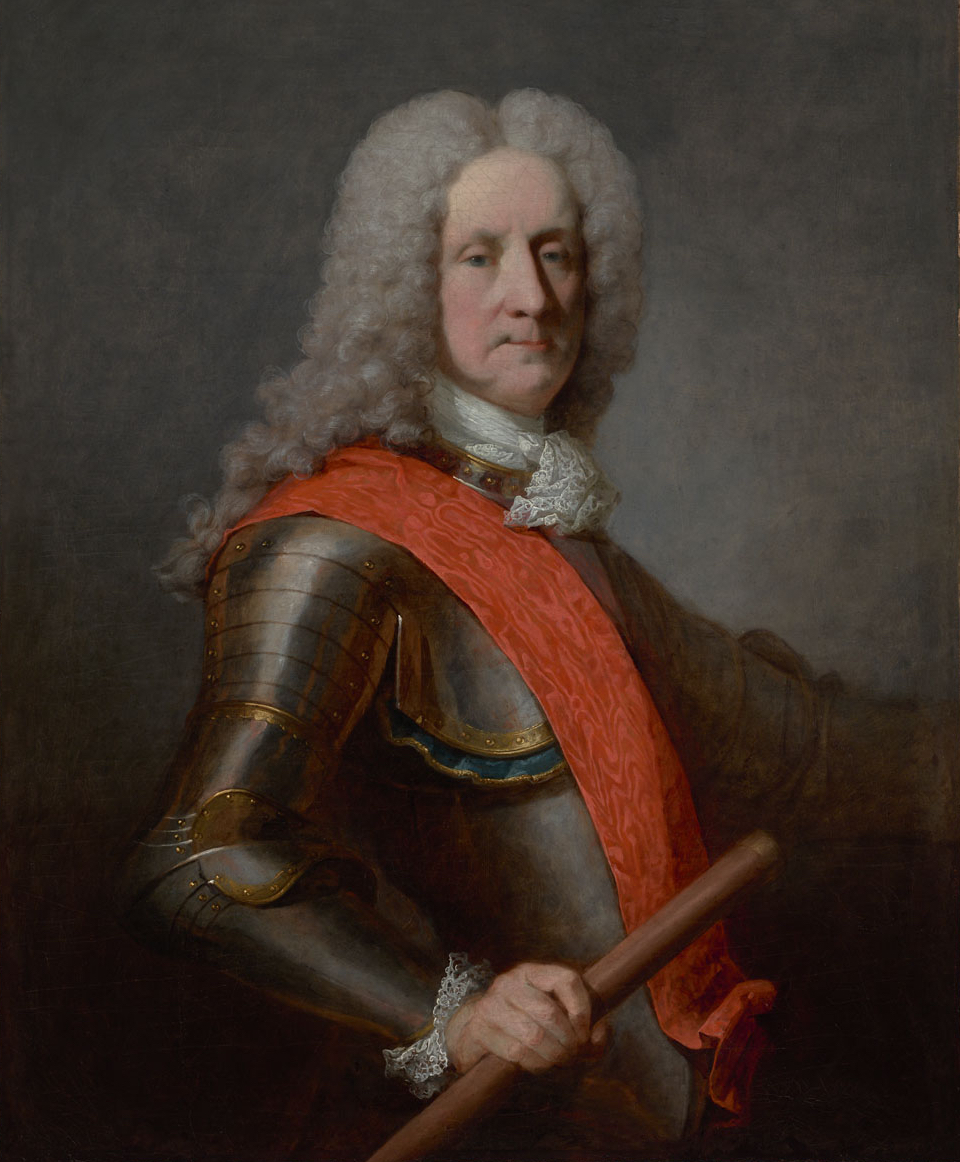
- Born: 12 October 1671; Orléans, France
- Died: 12 July 1749 (aged 77); Paris, France
- Occupations: Career in the Marines, Governor General of New France

Signature
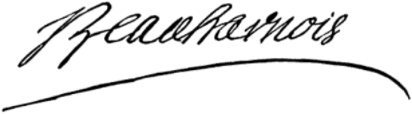

Charles de la Boische, Marquis de Beauharnois (French pronunciation: [ʃaʁl də la bwaʃ maʁki də boaʁnwa]; c. 12 October 1671 – 12 July 1749) was a French Naval officer who served as Governor of New France from 1726 to 1746.

== Biography ==
Son of François IV de Beauharnais, Charles had two brothers who also impacted the history of New France. Claude de Beauharnois was a French Naval officer who spent time commanding ships that maintained supply lines to the colony and François de Beauharnois was intendant of New France for a time.

The governor worked well with frontier traders, explorers, and missionaries. His term saw a great expansion in the number of western forts with the leadership of people like La Vérendrye, and the linkage of Canadian and Louisiana colonies. Exploration was pushed west to the Rocky Mountains by La Vérendrye and his sons.

Despite a generally peaceful and prosperous administration, he was blamed for the fall of Fortress Louisbourg in 1745, and was recalled in 1746, returning to France to following year.

Beauharnais was one of three governors-general of Canada known to have owned enslaved people. During his tenure, he owned 27 people, among them two Africans and a number of Meskwaki and Inuit.

== Legacy ==
Many places carry his name including the town of Beauharnois, Quebec and Fort Beauharnois, Minnesota.

Government offices
| Preceded by Philippe de Rigaud Vaudreuil | Governor General of New France; 1726 – 1746 | Succeeded by Comte de La Galissonnière |
