= Alexandre de Beauharnais =

French revolutionary politician and general (1760-1794)

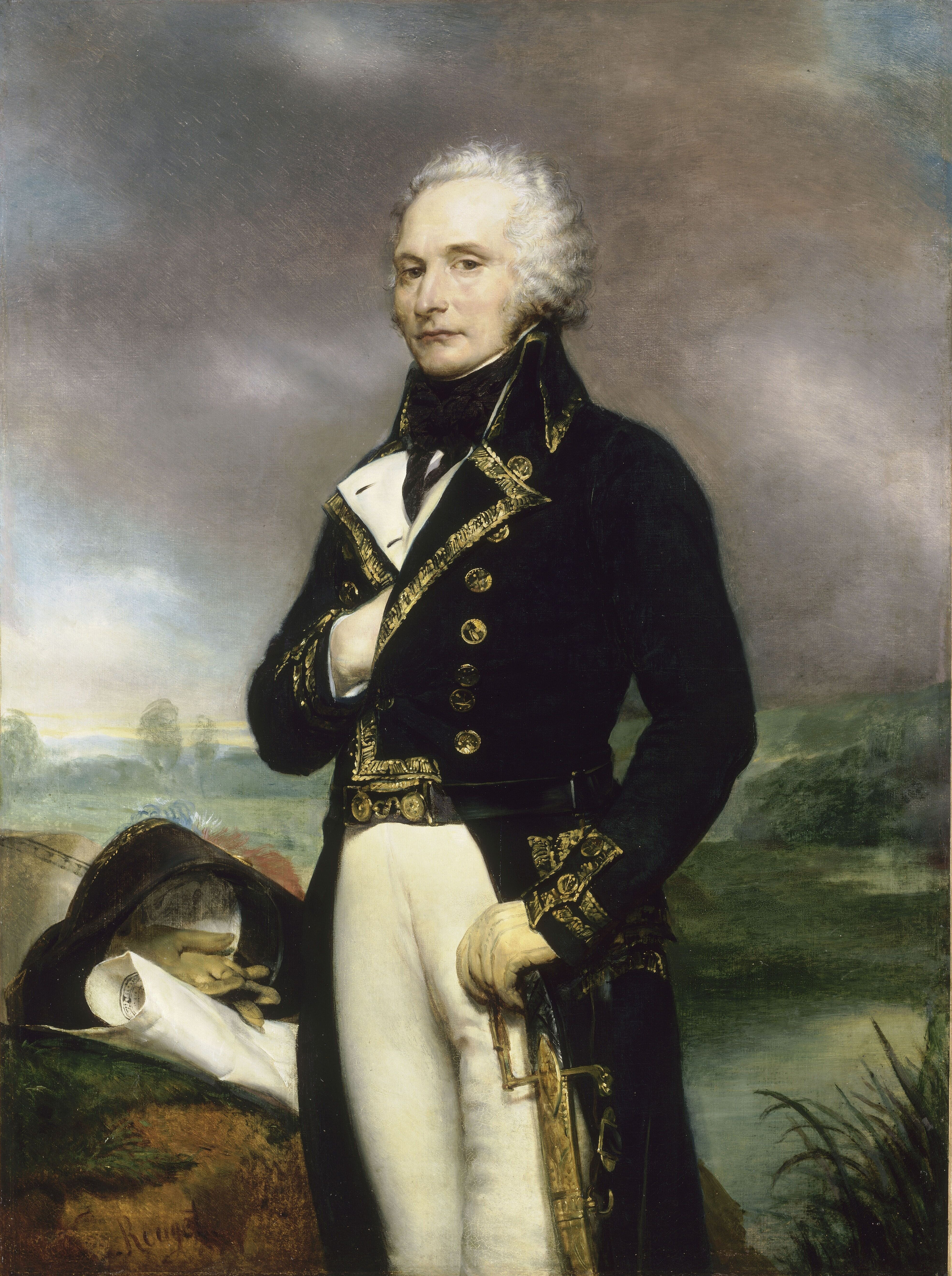

President of the Constituent National Assembly
- In office 19 June – 3 July 1791
- Preceded by: Luc Dauchy
- Succeeded by: Charles de Lameth
- In office 31 July – 13 August 1791
- Preceded by: Jacques Defermon des Chapelières
- Succeeded by: Victor de Broglie

Personal details
- Born: 28 May 1760 Fort-Royal, Martinique, France
- Died: 23 July 1794 (aged 34) Paris, France
- Resting place: Picpus Cemetery, Paris
- Spouse: Marie Josèphe Rose Tascher de La Pagerie (m. 1779)
- Children: Eugène de Beauharnais (son); Hortense de Beauharnais (daughter)
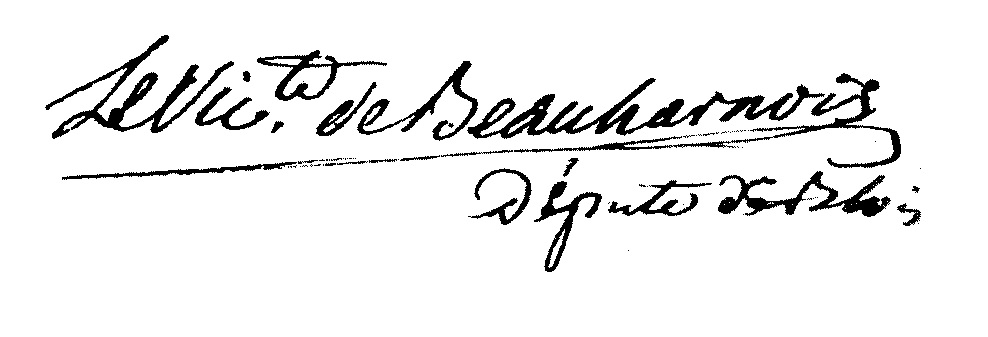
- Signature

Military service
- Allegiance: Kingdom of France; Kingdom of France; First French Republic
- Branch/service: Army
- Years of service: 1775–1794
- Rank: General of division
- Commands: Army of the Rhine
- Battles/wars: American Revolutionary War; French Revolutionary Wars; War of the First Coalition; Siege of Mainz

Alexandre François Marie, Viscount of Beauharnais (French pronunciation: [alɛksɑ̃dʁ də boaʁnɛ]; 28 May 1760 – 23 July 1794) was a French politician and general of the French Revolution. He was the first husband of Joséphine Tascher de La Pagerie, who later married Napoleon Bonaparte and became empress of France. Beauharnais was executed by guillotine during the Reign of Terror.

== Family ==
Beauharnais was born to the noble Beauharnais family in Fort-Royal (now Fort-de-France), Martinique, in the French West Indies. He was the son of Governor François de Beauharnais, Marquis de La Ferté-Beauharnais, and Marie Anne Henriette Françoise Pyvart de Chastullé. On 13 December 1779 in Paris, he married Joséphine Tascher de la Pagerie, the future Empress of France. They had two children, Eugène (1781–1824) and Hortense (1783–1837), but, while he assumed legal paternity of Hortense, when his wife told him of the birth he wrote her that he knew for certain that the baby was the result of adultery.

== Career ==
Beauharnais began his military career in an infantry regiment at Martinique. He served in the American Revolutionary War under the Count of Rochambeau, and became acquainted with the court of King Louis XVI upon his return to France. A supporter of the French Revolution, Beauharnais was elected a deputy of the nobility to the Estates-General of 1789, where he was one of the first nobles to go over to the Third Estate, and voted in favor of the abolition of feudalism.

Beauharnais played a prominent role in the succeeding National Constituent Assembly, serving as its president from 19 June to 3 July 1791 and from 31 July to 14 August 1791. He then returned to the army with the rank of colonel, and was employed in the Army of the North. Promoted to general in 1792, at the start of the French Revolutionary Wars, Beauharnais refused in June 1793 the post of Minister of War. He was appointed commander-in-chief of the Army of the Rhine in 1793.

== Death ==
On 2 March 1794, the Committee of General Security ordered his arrest. Accused of having poorly defended Mainz during the siege in 1793, and considered an aristocratic suspect, he was jailed in Carmes Prison and sentenced to death during the Reign of Terror. His wife, Joséphine, was jailed in the same prison on 21 April 1794 but was freed three months later, thanks to the fall of Maximilien Robespierre. Beauharnais was guillotined, together with his cousin Augustin, on the Place de la Révolution (today's Place de la Concorde) in Paris on 23 July 1794, five days before the end of the Reign of Terror.

== Ancestry ==
His paternal grandparents Claude de Beauharnais (1680–1738) and Renée Hardouineau (1696–1744) were married in La Rochelle during 1713. His father François de Beauharnais, Marquess de la La Ferté-Beauharnais (1714–1800) served as Governor of Martinique. Alexandre was the third of three sons born to him by his first wife Marie Henriette Pyvart de Chastullé (1722–1767) - the first died in infancy, and the second was Francis VI of Beauharnais. His father was remarried in 1796 to Eugenie de Tascher de la Pagerie (1739–1803).
