= Adolphus Vane-Tempest =

British actor (1863–1932)

Francis Adolphus Vane-Tempest
- Vane-Tempest in 1909
- Born: 4 January 1863; London, England
- Died: 10 December 1932 (aged 69); London, England
- Education: Harrow School
- Alma mater: Balliol College, Oxford
- Occupation: Actor
- Spouse: Gertude Magdalen Elliot (m. 1901)
- Children: 1
- Parents: Lord Adolphus Vane-Tempest (father); Lady Susan Vane-Tempest (mother)
- Relatives: Henry Pelham-Clinton (maternal grandfather); Lady Susan Hamilton (maternal grandmother); Charles Vane (paternal grandfather); Frances Vane (paternal grandmother)
- Military career
- Allegiance: United Kingdom
- Branch: British Army
- Service years: 1914–1918
- Rank: Major
- Unit: Royal Field Artillery
- Conflicts: World War I

Francis Adolphus Vane-Tempest (4 January 1863 – 10 December 1932) was an English actor of the late-19th and early 20th centuries. He was known for playing amiable but not over-bright upper class characters. Among the roles he created was Mr Dumby in Oscar Wilde's 1892 comedy Lady Windermere's Fan. His theatrical career continued until the First World War, when he joined the army. He did not return to the stage thereafter.

== Life and career ==
Vane-Tempest was born into an aristocratic family in London in 1863, the only child of Lord Adolphus Vane-Tempest and his wife, Lady Susan Vane-Tempest (née Pelham-Clinton). His grandfathers were Charles Vane, 3rd Marquess of Londonderry and Henry Pelham-Clinton, 5th Duke of Newcastle. He was educated at Harrow School and Balliol College, Oxford.

After leaving Oxford he attempted to pursue a political career, unsuccessfully standing for the Conservatives in the Mid-Durham constituency at elections in 1885 and 1890. During this period he was prominent in amateur theatricals, often staged by him together with the professional Arthur Bourchier, raising money for charitable causes. In 1891 he turned professional, and toured with Kate Vaughan in H. A. Jones's The Dancing Girl. His role, the Hon Reginald Slingsby, was a comic upper-class knut, and Vane-Tempest was frequently cast as similar characters during the rest of his career.

With Mary Moore in Captain Drew on Leave (1906)

Vane-Tempest was in the cast of Cecil Clay's farcical comedy A Pantomime Rehearsal at Toole's Theatre, after which he was engaged in 1892 by George Alexander for his company at the St James's Theatre, where he created the role of Mr Dumby in Lady Windermere's Fan in February of that year. In 1893 he played Sir George Orreyed in Arthur Wing Pinero's The Second Mrs Tanqueray. The Morning Post commented that he "gave a capital idea of the imbecile baronet", and The Era called him "remarkably clever in realising the vulgar, brutish character of the young baronet".

According to The Times, Vane-Tempest had "effective parts in some of the best of H. A. Jones's comedies": The Masqueraders (1894), The Case of Rebellious Susan (1894), and The Liars (1897). In 1901 he married Gertrude Magdalen, daughter of F. A. Elliot and Lady Jones Parry; she predeceased him. They had one child, Francis.

When Hubert Henry Davies wrote Captain Drew on Leave for Charles Wyndham's company (1905) Vane-Tempest created the role of Mr White. The Times listed among other plays of the first decade of the 20th century in which Vane-Tempest made an impression, R. C. Carton's Mr Preedy and the Countess (1909, as the Hon Robert Jennaway) and Monckton Hoffe's The Little Damozel (1909, as the Hon Fitzroy Lock). Among his later stage appearances was as Lord Alfred Blakeney, the aide-de-camp in George A. Birmingham's General John Regan, produced by Charles Hawtrey at the Apollo Theatre in 1913.

On the outbreak of war in 1914 Vane-Tempest joined the Third Northumberland Royal Field Artillery, as a captain, and was later promoted to major. After resuming civilian life after the war he did not return to the stage.

Vane-Tempest died in London on 10 December 1932, aged 69.
