= Hamilton Mausoleum =

Mausoleum of the Dukes of Hamilton, Scotland

Coordinates: 55.783350°N 4.031500°W

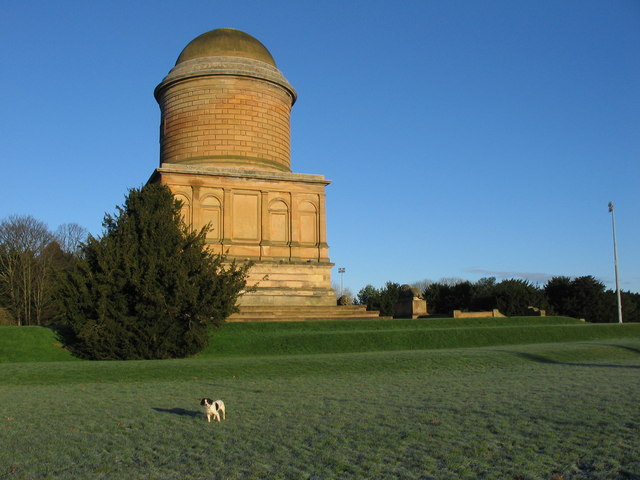
- Hamilton Mausoleum
- Interactive map of Hamilton Mausoleum
- Location: Hamilton, South Lanarkshire, Scotland
- Designer: David Hamilton; David Bryce
- Material: sandstone, marble, bronze
- Height: 37.6 m (123 ft)
- Beginning date: 1842
- Completion date: 1858

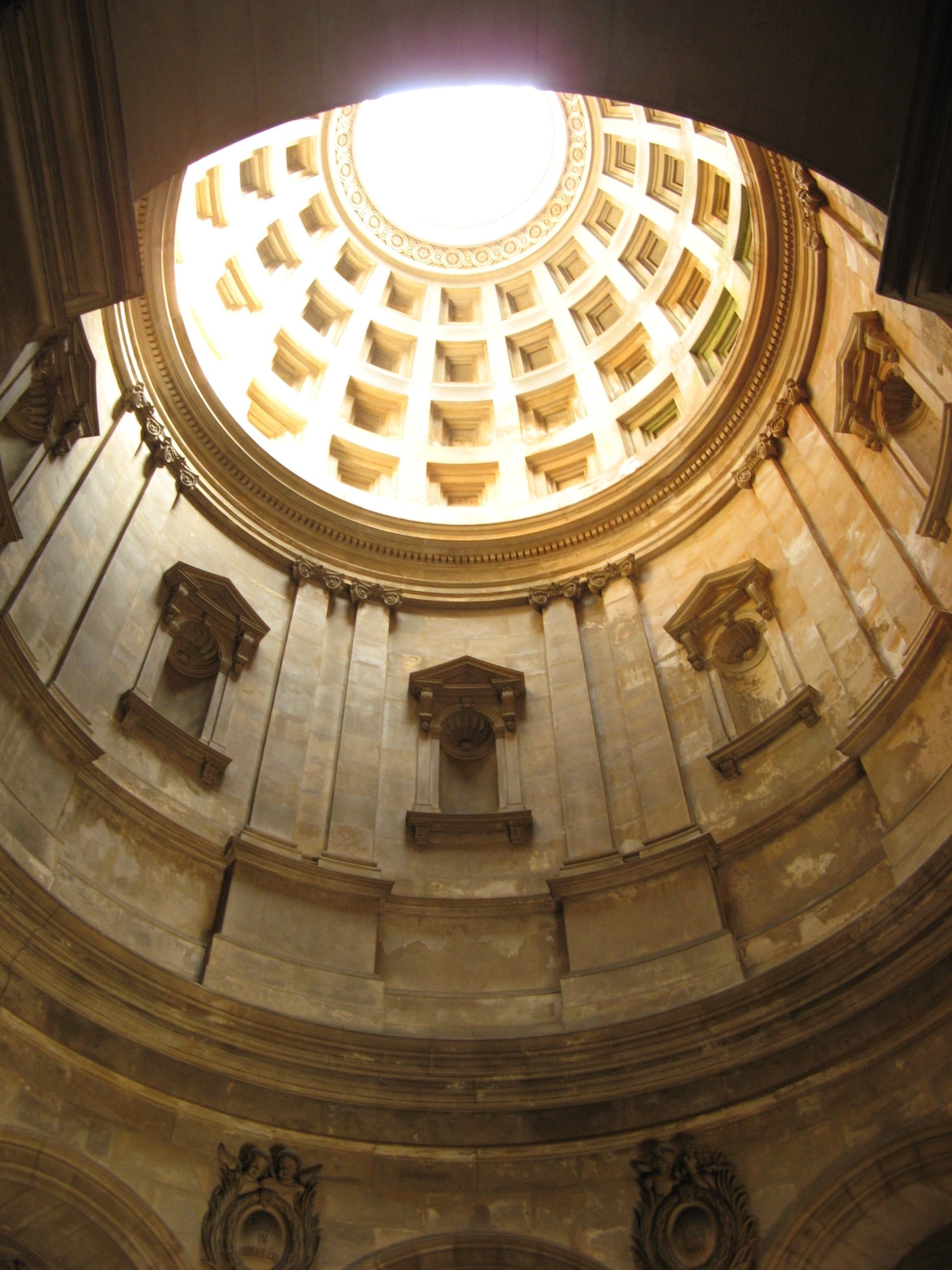
Interior of the mausoleum, upper view

The Hamilton Mausoleum is a mausoleum located in Hamilton, South Lanarkshire, Scotland. It was the resting place of the family of the Dukes of Hamilton. The mausoleum is Category A listed. Built in the grounds of the now-demolished Hamilton Palace, its high stone vault holds the record for the longest echo within any man-made structure in the world, taking 15 seconds for the sound of a slammed door to fade. In 2014 the record was thought to have been broken at the Inchindown oil storage tanks in the Scottish Highlands, however this was classed as a reverberation, rather than an echo.

== Construction ==
In line with his grandiose enlargement of Hamilton Palace, Alexander, 10th Duke of Hamilton, replaced his family burial vault which stood close to the east quarter of the palace in the aisle of the old and dilapidated collegiate church. Now the solitary remaining testament to the colossal scale and grandeur of the buildings which once stood in Hamilton Low Parks, Hamilton Palace Mausoleum is a Roman-style domed structure of panelled masonry. Standing to an overall height of about 123 feet (37 m), it occupies a site some 650 feet (200 m) north of the site of Hamilton Palace. Construction was begun in 1840 by architect David Hamilton and completed by architects David Bryce and sculptor Alexander Handyside Ritchie in 1858, five years after the death of the 10th Duke. The eastern end includes a grand set of stairs flanked by two lions (one asleep and one awake).

The Duke was interred in an Egyptian sarcophagus of the Ptolemaic period, on a black marble slab in the main chapel, while 17 of his ancestors were interred in the crypt below. By the 1920s subsidence and flooding from the River Clyde affected the mausoleum. In April 1921, with the consent of the Marchioness of Graham and Lady Mary Victoria Douglas-Hamilton, the trustees of the 12th Duke of Hamilton petitioned Hamilton Sheriff Court for permission to remove the remains of the 17 members of the House of Hamilton buried in Hamilton Mausoleum, and have them re-buried in ground they had purchased in Hamilton's Bent Cemetery. The remains of the 11th and 12th dukes were re-buried on the Isle of Arran, while the others were re-buried in Hamilton's Bent Cemetery in 1921.

== Later history ==
During the 1960s and 1970s, the mausoleum was observed to be subsiding, and a 20-foot (6-metre) plumb-line hanging on the front of it indicated that it was leaning. However, the monolithic plinth-based construction prevented structural cracking, and after many years of anxiety the building settled back to near vertical.

Inside the mausoleum are displayed the original bronze entrance doors, based on the Florence Baptistery doors of Lorenzo Ghiberti. The interior has one of the longest-lasting echoes in the world, a phenomenon demonstrated to visitors by slamming the doors. Another curiosity of the interior is the "Whispering Wa's" or walls. Two people can stand at either end of one of the curved interior walls, facing away from each other into the niche of the wall, and hold a whispered conversation. The remarkable acoustics of the building project the sound to the listener at the other side.

In the early 21st century, the mausoleum had begun to deteriorate, and a charitable trust was formed to preserve it and the adjacent keeper's lodge. In May 2021, charitable donations enabled restoration work on the mausoleum costing almost £500,000 to be begun.

== People originally buried in Hamilton Mausoleum ==
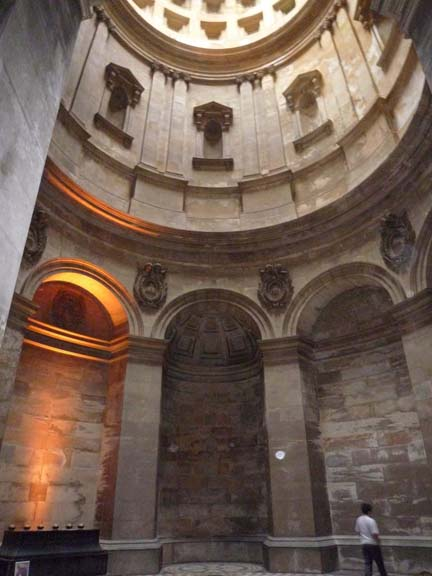
View of the ground floor interior

- James Hamilton, 1st Lord Hamilton, in 1852
- John Hamilton, 1st Marquess of Hamilton, in 1852
- James Hamilton, 1st Duke of Hamilton, in 1852
- Anne Hamilton, 3rd Duchess of Hamilton, in 1852
- James Hamilton, 4th Duke of Hamilton, in 1852
- Lord William Hamilton, in 1852
- James Hamilton, 5th Duke of Hamilton, in 1852
- James Hamilton, 6th Duke of Hamilton, in 1852
- James Hamilton, 7th Duke of Hamilton, in 1852
- Harriet Hamilton, Duchess of Hamilton, in 1852
- Douglas Hamilton, 8th Duke of Hamilton, in 1852
- Archibald Hamilton, 9th Duke of Hamilton, in 1852
- Lord Archibald Hamilton, in 1852
- Alexander Hamilton, 10th Duke of Hamilton, on 4 September 1852
- Susan Hamilton, Duchess of Hamilton, on 9 June 1859
- William Hamilton, 11th Duke of Hamilton, on 23 July 1863
- Charles George Hamilton, 7th Earl of Selkirk, in 1886
- William Douglas-Hamilton, 12th Duke of Hamilton, on 31 May 1895
