= Lady Susan Vane-Tempest =

English aristocrat (1839-1875)

Lady Adolphus Vane-Tempest
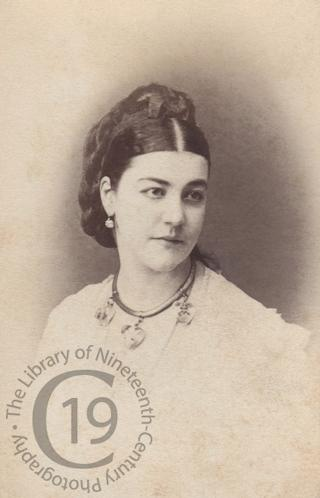
- Born: Lady Susan Charlotte Catherine Pelham-Clinton; 7 April 1839
- Died: 6 September 1875 (aged 36)
- Spouse: Lord Adolphus Vane-Tempest (m. 1860; died 1864)
- Children: Major Adolphus Vane-Tempest
- Parents: Henry Pelham-Clinton, 5th Duke of Newcastle (father); Lady Susan Hamilton (mother)
- Relatives: Henry Pelham-Clinton, 6th Duke of Newcastle-under-Lyne (brother); Lord Arthur Clinton (brother)

Susan Charlotte Catherine, Lady Adolphus Vane-Tempest (7 April 1839 – 6 September 1875), born Lady Susan Pelham-Clinton, was a British noblewoman and one of the mistresses of King Edward VII of the United Kingdom when he was Prince of Wales. Lady Susan was a bridesmaid to Victoria, Princess Royal, and two years later became the wife of Lord Adolphus Vane-Tempest. She took the Prince as her lover in about 1864 following her husband's death, and allegedly gave birth to his illegitimate child in 1871.

== Family ==
Lady Susan was born on 7 April 1839, the only daughter of British politician Henry Pelham-Clinton, 5th Duke of Newcastle, and Lady Susan Hamilton (daughter of Alexander Hamilton, 10th Duke of Hamilton, and Susan Beckford). She had four brothers including Henry Pelham-Clinton, 6th Duke of Newcastle-under-Lyne, and Lord Arthur Clinton (who was involved in the 1870 Boulton and Park scandal).

Her childhood was blighted by her parents' divorce in 1850, following the scandal when her mother eloped with her lover, Lord Walpole, by whom she had an illegitimate son, Horatio. In 1860, her mother, a divorcee, would marry for a second time a Belgian, Jean Alexis Opdebeck.

On 25 January 1858, Lady Susan stood as one of the bridesmaids to Victoria, Princess Royal, at her wedding to Emperor Frederick III at St James's Palace. She was depicted in the John Phillip painting which commemorated the event.

== Marriage ==
Susan married Lord Adolphus Vane-Tempest on 23 April 1860, several weeks after her twenty-first birthday. He held the rank of Lieutenant-Colonel in the Army and was allegedly an alcoholic as well as mentally unstable. Queen Victoria described him as having "a natural tendency to madness". He died just four years after their marriage, which had produced one son:

- Major Francis Adolphus Vane-Tempest (4 January 1863 – 10 December 1932)

On at least one occasion, Susan and her infant son were both physically attacked by her unstable husband.

== Prince of Wales ==
Sometime after her husband's death which occurred on 11 June 1864, she became the mistress of the Prince of Wales (later King Edward VII). He had married Alexandra of Denmark in 1863. According to author John Van der Kiste, Susan bore the Prince an illegitimate child in 1871. He cites in his book Edward VII's Children that one of Susan's confidantes wrote to Edward advising him that the "crisis was due within two or three months", which is presumably a reference to Susan's pregnancy. She allegedly gave birth to the Prince's child in Ramsgate at the end of 1871. Nothing, however, is known of the subsequent fate because when Susan died on 6 September 1875 at the age of 36, she took the secret with her to the grave.
