= Hamilton Palace =

Grand house in South Lanarkshire, Scotland

Coordinates: 55.780000°N 4.031500°W

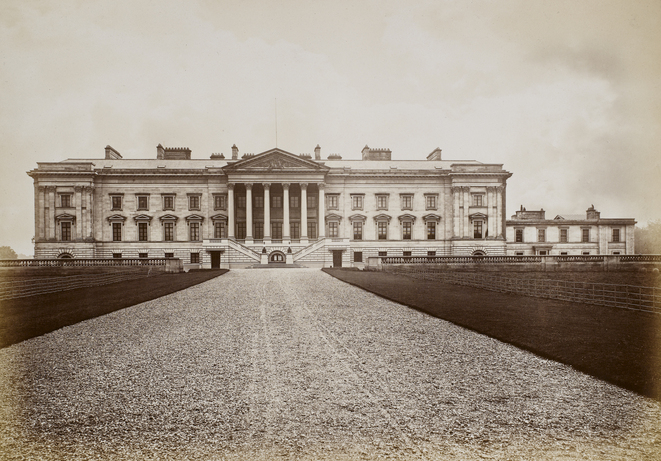
- Hamilton Palace in 1870.
- Interactive map of the Hamilton Palace area

General information
- Status: Demolished
- Architectural style: Baroque, Neoclassical
- Location: Hamilton, South Lanarkshire, Scotland
- Construction started: 14th century
- Completed: 1701, with additions 1824-1832
- Demolished: 1921-1932

Design and construction
- Architects: James Smith; William Adam; David Hamilton

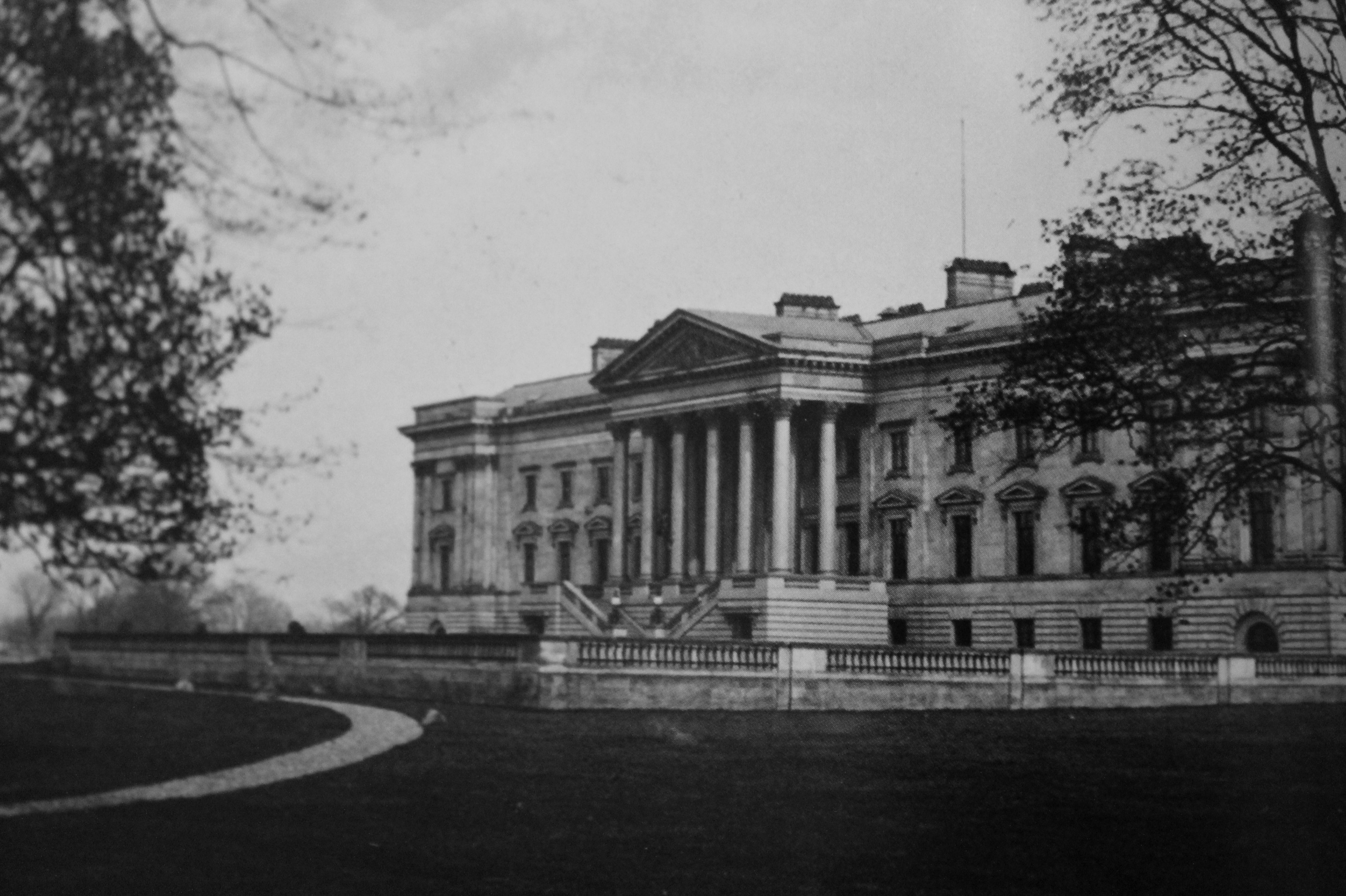
Hamilton Palace from the north-west by Thomas Annan

Hamilton Palace was a country house in Hamilton, South Lanarkshire, Scotland. It was the seat of the Dukes of Hamilton and is widely acknowledged as having been one of the grandest houses in the British Isles. The palace dated from the 14th century, was rebuilt in the Baroque style between 1684 and 1701 and was subsequently much enlarged in the Neoclassical style between 1824 and 1832.

The palace was situated at the centre of the extensive Low Parks (now Strathclyde Country Park), with the Great Avenue, a broad, north–south tree-lined avenue over three miles (five kilometres) in length, as its axis. The Low Parks also contained the Hamilton Mausoleum designed by David Hamilton and the 11th-century Netherton Cross. South of the Avon Water, the High Parks (now Chatelherault Country Park) contained the Deer Park and the Chatelherault Hunting Lodge designed by William Adam. The palace housed two libraries and a renowned collection of fine and decorative art which were dispersed in two huge sales in 1882 and 1919.

Hamilton Palace was demolished between 1921 and 1932 after coal works beneath the house were discovered to threaten its structural integrity.

== History ==
=== 13th-16th centuries ===
The building at the core of Hamilton Palace was a 14th-century tower house known variously as 'The Orchard' or the 'Castle of Hamilton', which was the seat of the Hamilton family. The earliest reference to a castle at Hamilton is in a charter of 1445, when James Hamilton was created first Lord Hamilton. When the palace was demolished in the 1920s, the remains of walls up to 2.7 m (8 ft 10 in) thick (compared to 0.9 m (2 ft 11 in) elsewhere in the building), were discovered in the north-west quarter, clearly indicating the defensive nature of the medieval core of the palace. In 1451 the medieval parish church of Hamilton (which stood to the east of the later palace) was promoted to collegial status by Lord Hamilton. 'The Orchard' was the object of much destructive attention on the part of royal armies in the period between 1565 and 1579, suffering damage in a siege of 1570 during the Marian civil war due to James Hamilton, Duke of Châtellerault's support for Mary, Queen of Scots. The castle was damaged again in 1579 on the occasion when Cadzow Castle was destroyed and left abandoned. It accommodated King James VI on a hunting trip in 1589. 'The Orchard' was rebuilt and enlarged in 1591 on a quadrangular plan and named the 'Palace'.

=== 17th-18th centuries ===
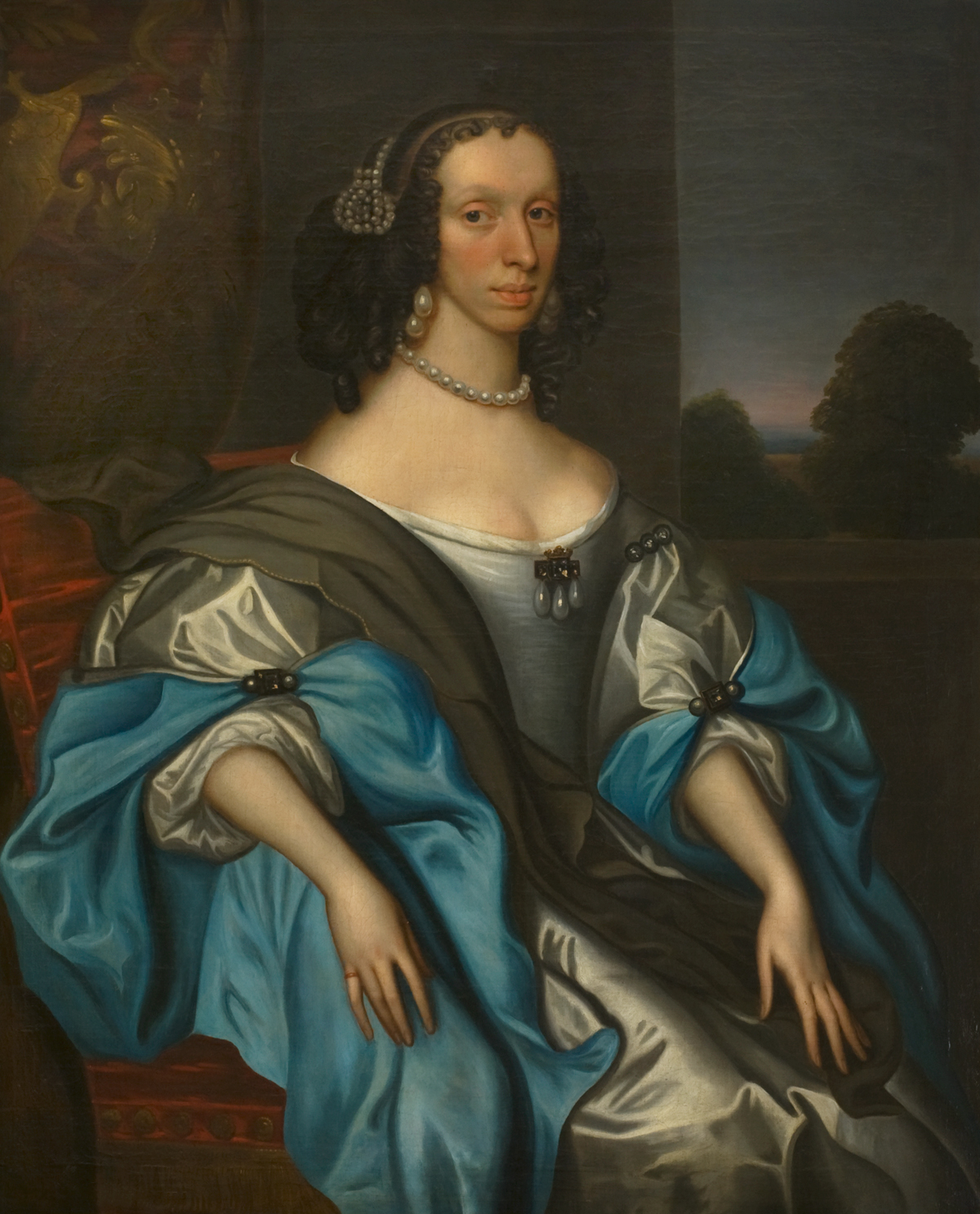
Anne Hamilton, 3rd Duchess of Hamilton, by David Scougall.

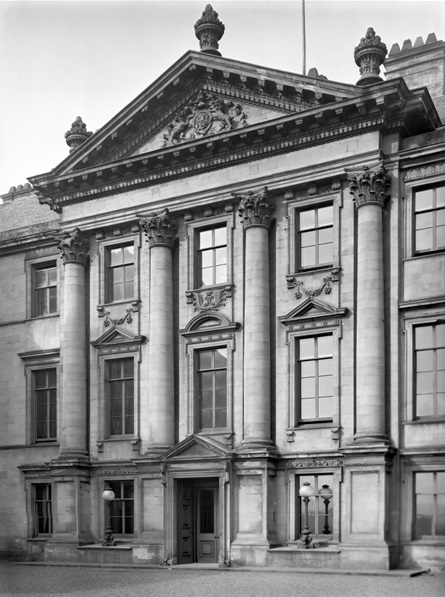
South Front front, completed 1701

Anne, 3rd Duchess of Hamilton and her husband, William, Duke of Hamilton, commissioned a major rebuilding programme at Hamilton Palace from 1684 to 1701. Dubbed by the Hamilton family as 'The Great Design', these works led to the creation of a U-plan country house, with an open south-facing courtyard which followed the outline of the existing late 16th-century enclosed quadrangle. Under the direction of the architect James Smith, the south quarter of Hamilton Palace was removed entirely, the east and west quarters were rebuilt as courtyard wings, while the north wing was left much as it had been before, although it was refaced and remodelled internally. The south front was rebuilt between 1693 and 1701 in the Baroque style, the principal feature of this new formal ceremonial entrance being the frontispiece with its huge Corinthian portico. Behind the facade of the remodelled north front, the first floor was fully taken up by the 36.6 m (120 ft) Long Gallery, while the first floor of the west wing contained the main suite of ducal apartments.

A new north front had been planned by James, 5th Duke of Hamilton in the 1730s, and extensive plans were prepared by William Adam. The Duke's early death and the significant costs involved prevented the plans from being executed, but significant programme of interior decoration was carried out in the east wing of the palace under Adam's supervision. Modifications and additions continued during the next century, including the purchase or exchange of land surrounding the palace, enabling extensive landscaping to take place.

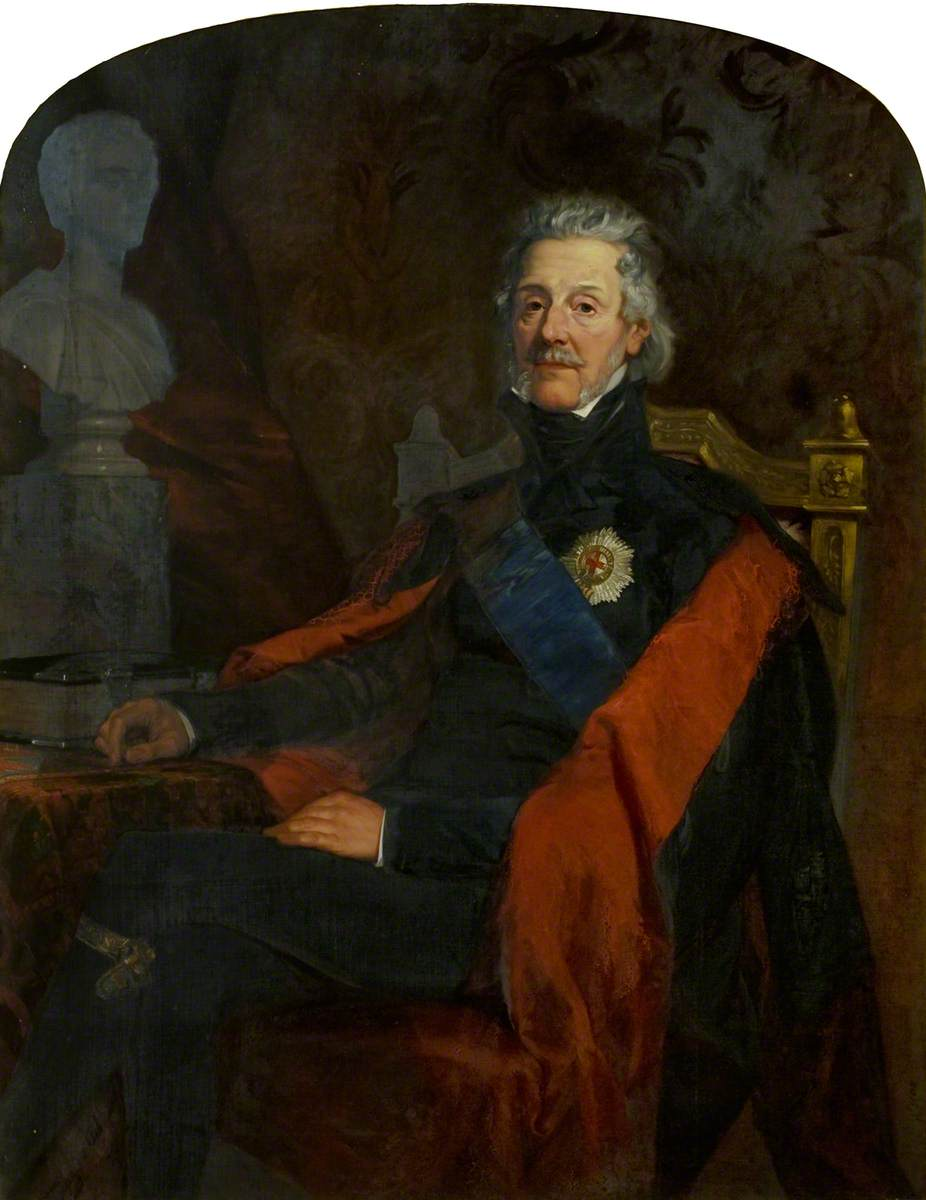
Alexander, 10th Duke of Hamilton 1852 by Willes Maddox

=== 19th century ===
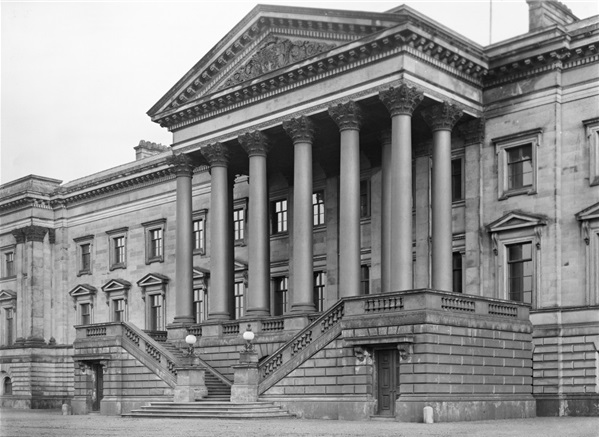
North Front portico, completed 1828

Upon his succession to the ducal title and estates in 1819, Alexander, 10th Duke of Hamilton began to enhance and enlarge the north front of Hamilton Palace, using the vast wealth that the family derived from their ownership of the Lanarkshire coalfields. The Duke wanted to erect a grand residence which not only reflected the increasing wealth and national standing of the family but also provided an appropriately grand setting for the considerable art collections which he continued to gather, including the Beckford art collection and library that his wife Susan had inherited from her father William Thomas Beckford. This refurbishment included heraldic carvings in the main pediment over the entrance, carved by John Greenshields in 1822. Between 1824 and 1832 the north front itself was enhanced and enlarged by the distinguished Glasgow architect David Hamilton. The 15-bayed, three storey north front was 265 ft (80 m) long and 60 ft (20 m) high, adorned with a colossal portico of six 25-foot-high (7.5-metre) Corinthian columns. In addition to existing rooms such as the Long Gallery, Old Dining Room, Old State Breakfast Room, Old State Drawing Room and Old State Bedroom, new state rooms such as the Egyptian Hall, Entrance Hall, Tribune, Billiard Room, Charter Room, State Dining Room, Drawing Room, State Bedroom, Music Room, the Hamilton Library and the Beckford Library were built. These held much fine furniture and by the mid-19th century housed one of the best private collections of paintings in Scotland, including works by Peter Paul Rubens (see below), Titian, Anthony van Dyck, and other masters. A sumptuous chimneypiece by William Morgan adorned the Dining Room's fireplace.

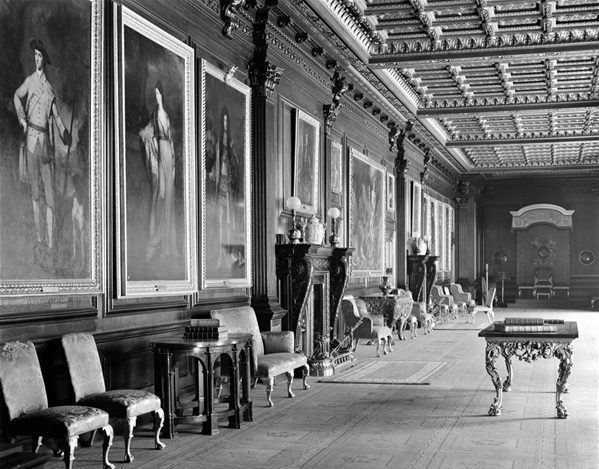
Long Gallery, with paintings of James, 6th Duke of Hamilton, Elizabeth, Duchess of Hamilton, Daniel in the Lions' Den (see below) and the Ambassadorial Throne and Canopy of the 10th Duke

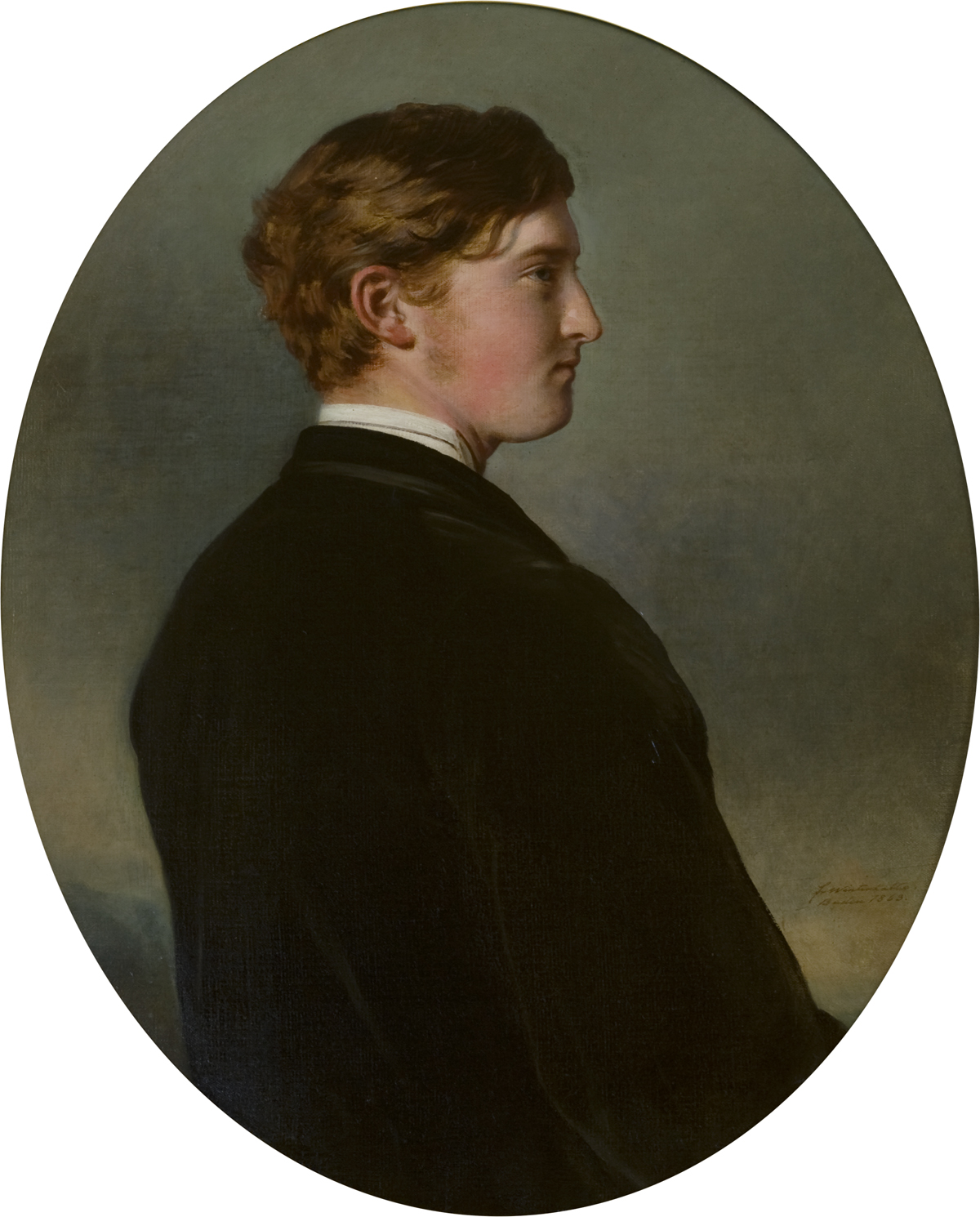
William, 12th Duke of Hamilton 1863, by Franz Xaver Winterhalter

The new palace provided an appropriate setting for a number of magnificent social events: in 1831 it was visited by Marie Thérèse of France, the eldest child of Louis XVI and Marie Antoinette, while in 1843 Henri, Count of Chambord visited the palace and a grand reception was held there following the marriage of the future 11th Duke to Princess Marie Amelie of Baden. In 1851 the palace was visited by Victoria, Duchess of Kent (the mother of Queen Victoria), and in 1860, a great crowd gathered in the park to catch a glimpse of the visiting French empress Eugénie. A grand ball was held at the palace in her honour.

After his marriage in 1843, William, 11th Duke of Hamilton lived chiefly in France and Germany, took little interest in his Scottish or English affairs and never attended the House of Lords. His son, William, 12th Duke of Hamilton, took a great interest in horse racing, gambling and sailing. He disliked Hamilton Palace and resided at Brodick Castle on the Isle of Arran and, after his marriage to Lady Mary Montagu, the eldest daughter of the 7th Duke of Manchester, in December 1873, he developed Easton Park in Suffolk (which had been inherited by the 10th Duke in 1830) as his principal seat and sporting estate. It was closer to the major race courses and also meant that he could base his steam yacht Thistle at Ipswich, from where he could sail to Brodick Castle, Cowes and racecourse venues on the continent.

Hamilton Palace was visited in January 1878 by Edward, Prince of Wales, Napoléon, Prince Imperial and Rudolf, Crown Prince of Austria for game shooting in the High Parks, with their visit concluding with a grand ball with 400 guests. By the later 19th century, Hamilton Palace was proving expensive to maintain, and was used only as an occasional residence by the Hamilton family. The programmes of rebuilding and art collecting on the part of the 10th Duke and his successors had left a heavy burden of debt on the estate. The 12th Duke of Hamilton spent a fortune on horses, increasing the Hamiltons’ debts to around £1.5 million. The 12th Duke was only saved from financial ruin when his race horse Cortolvin won the 1867 Grand National horse race, with the substantial prize money and the £16,000 from the bookmakers restoring his fortune substantially. However, in order to fund his continued extravagancies, in 1882 the Duke was forced to sell the Beckford art collection, Beckford Library, and Hamilton Library housed in Hamilton Palace. The Hamilton Palace Sale at Christie's in London took place from 17 June to 20 July 1882 and involved the sale of some 2,213 articles. The sale included paintings by Dürer, Rembrandt, Rubens, Velázquez and van Dyck; Chinese, Japanese, Meissen, Sèvres and English porcelain; bronzes, furniture, tapestries, chandeliers, busts, and vases. The sale raised almost £397,562 and, when added to the sale of the libraries, realized £786,847, equivalent to £81,839,058 in 2025.

== Decline ==
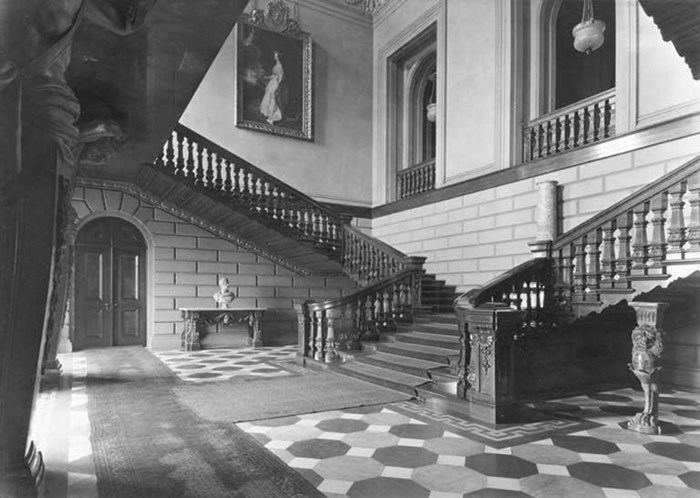
Double staircase of Irish black marble (1840–1845) by the London Marble & Stone Working Company, two huge bronze atlantes by Louis Soyer (1842), and the painting of Eugénie de Montijo

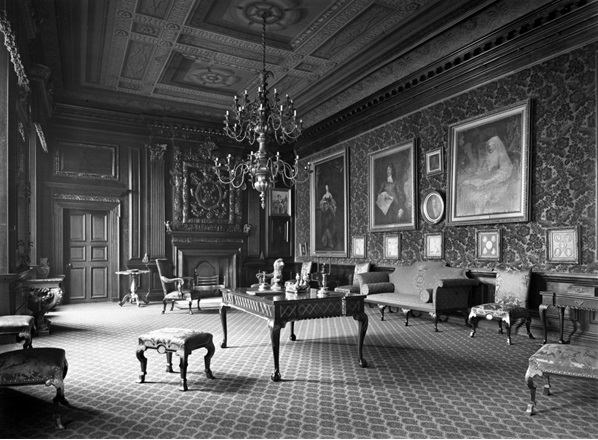
Great Dining Room

The 12th Duke died at Algiers in 1895. He owned 157,000 acres (64,000 hectares) in Scotland and England (worth an estimated annual income of £147,000 - £118 million as of 2023), but still had debts of £1.5 million. The Duke's trust disposition and settlement conveyed his estate to trustees and left detailed instructions for the administration of his estate, which comprised the Hamilton Estates (in Lanarkshire, including Hamilton Palace); the Arran Estate (Brodick Castle and the greater part of the Isle of Arran); the Kinneil Estates (in Stirlingshire, including Kinneil House) and the Easton Estate and the Great Glemham Estate in Suffolk. The Duke's only child was his ten-year-old daughter, Lady Mary Hamilton, so the title of 13th Duke of Hamilton passed to his fourth cousin, Alfred Douglas-Hamilton, a poor Royal Navy lieutenant.

The 12th Duke's trustees were given power to sell the Glemham Estate and apply the proceeds, and that of some moveable property (including the Duke's yacht), towards paying off the debts on the Easton Estate. The Arran and Easton Estates, along with their income, passed to Lady Mary and her descendants, while the Hamilton and Kinneil Estates passed to the 13th Duke, who took on over £1 million in debts, which took him until July 1908 to pay off. The trust disposition and settlement of the 12th Duke also stated: "with reference to Hamilton Palace, which is not now used by me as a place of residence, that it shall be in the power of my said trustees if they, in their sole discretion, shall think it advisable to do so, to entirely displenish and dismantle the palace, and take down and remove the building, or allow the same to fall into disuse". In 1889 the 12th Duke had leased to the Bent Colliery Company (who owned the Hamilton Palace Colliery at nearby Bothwellhaugh), the coal under the Low Parks, to be worked on a system, known as the 'stoop and room' method, which would have left Hamilton Palace and the nearby Mausoleum supported by the pillars of coal known as stoops.

By the 20th century large and ostentatious country houses had fallen from fashion, partly due to the prohibitive cost of their upkeep. Hamilton Palace had long ceased to be a residence of the Hamilton family. The 13th Duke had been paralysed in 1890 by a rare tropical disease and considered the huge palace unsuitable as a modern residence, preferring to live a rural life at the smaller Dungavel House in Lanarkshire. The palace had not been updated since 1876 and could not be brought up to date and maintained with only the income from the Hamilton and Kinneil estates in central Scotland that the 13th Duke had inherited. In July 1914 the Duke and Duchess hosted King George V and Queen Mary when they visited the palace, which was marked by a grand reception. In June 1915 the Duke lent part of the palace for the accommodation of soldiers and sailors who had been injured during the First World War and discharged from hospitals and convalescent homes. In November 1915 the 12th Duke's trustees granted the Bent Colliery Company the authority to work the coal seam beneath Hamilton Palace.

== Sales and demolition ==
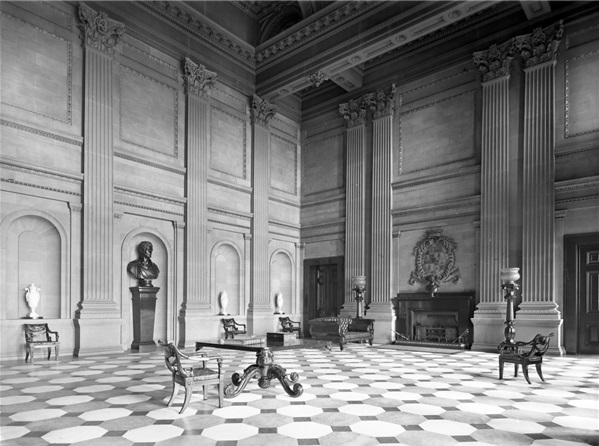
Entrance Hall, with bronze bust of the 10th Duke and black marble fireplace surmounted by the arms of the Duke of Hamilton

In June 1919 the trustees petitioned the Court of Session for authority to sell the contents of Hamilton Palace and then demolish the building. (Note: The trustees under the Hamilton Estates Act 1918 were John Fisher, 1st Baron Fisher, the Duchess of Hamilton, Theodore Hamilton Hoste, John MacRae-Gilstrap and Reginald McKenna.) The trustees had been advised that the coal workings then in progress beneath the palace would damage and might ultimately destroy the fabric of the palace, and so - with the approval of the 13th Duke - they had decided to demolish it. Permission was granted by the Court of Session on 12 June 1919. At this time, the magazine Country Life featured a number of articles on the palace and a quantity of photographs were taken by A. E. Henson, the magazine's staff photographer, to accompany the series. As such they represent an invaluable record of the palace before the sale of contents and fittings and its demolition.

The sale of the Hamilton Palace Collection took place from 4 to 7 November 1919 took place at Christie's. The sale raised £232,847 (equivalent to £10,395,005 in 2025) and included furniture, porcelain, silver plate, tapestries, jewellery and paintings by van Dyck, Rubens, Rembrandt, Reynolds, Romney, Raeburn, Delacroix and Winterhalter. The remaining contents of the palace - 572 lots including wood panelling, furniture, porcelain, carpets, curtains, sculpture and fittings - were sold at the palace from 12 to 14 November 1919, raising £29,000. In May 1920 Hamilton Town Council considered purchasing the building from the trustees, with a view to restoring it and converting it into flats for public housing, while in December of that year the Duke and Duchess of Hamilton gifted 22 acres (8.9 hectares) of ground at the south front of Hamilton Palace to the town council for recreational purposes In October 1921 the building was sold for £7,500 to the Edinburgh building contractor William D. Lillico for dismantling and demolition, with demolition work commencing in November 1921. The palace was so solidly built that it took far longer to dismantle and demolish than Lillico had expected. When the travel writer H. V. Morton visited Hamilton Palace in 1927 or 1928, he found that the roof had been removed, but that the black marble staircase and the bronze Atlantes were still in place in the now soaking interior. The last sections of the palace were demolished in 1932. In July 1922 Hamilton Town Council purchased 750 acres (300 hectares) of the Hamilton Estate, including Hamilton Mausoleum, the stables and the riding school, from the trustees for £20,250.

== Parks and landscape ==
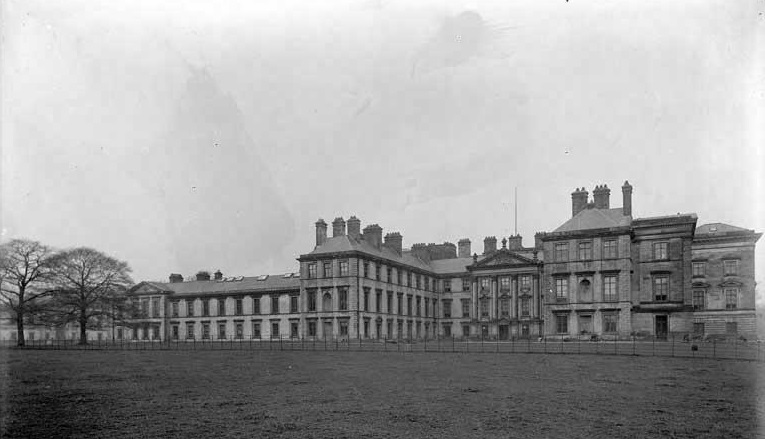
South Front

Hamilton Palace was built in the flood plain of the River Clyde and in close proximity to the town of Hamilton, which grew up around its western boundaries. Situated in the Low Parks, the palace stood at the centre of an extensive garden which, as its main axis, had a great north–south tree-lined avenue over three miles (five kilometres) in length. This designed landscape may have originated in the late 17th century but was first drawn up in 1708 by Alexander Edward. The layout was later developed, most notably by William Adam, who introduced Châtelherault hunting lodge into the south avenue in the High Parks where it commanded a broad vista northwards across the Low Parks. The Low Parks contained a number of buildings.

=== Netherton Cross ===
The Netherton Cross is the oldest symbol of Christianity in Hamilton. The location where the cross originally stood lay to the north of the medieval motte hill in the Low Parks, and is now part of Strathclyde Country Park. The Netherton Cross dates back to the 10th or 11th century and is a rare example of ecclesiastical sculpture from the Kingdom of Strathclyde. It is a free-standing carved cross of red sandstone standing to a height of 2.1 metres and is decorated on all four sides with figurative scenes of humans, animals and patterns. In 1857 Hamilton Town Council and the Duke of Hamilton appointed a committee to conserve the cross and a railing was erected around it to protect it.

The Duke and Duchess of Hamilton gifted the cross to Hamilton Town Council in January 1920. In 1926 the Netherton Cross was moved from its site in the Low Parks and erected in front of Hamilton Old Parish Church. The cross is under the protection of Historic Environment Scotland.

=== Hamilton Collegiate Church ===
The medieval parish church of Hamilton stood close to the east front of Hamilton Palace. Promoted to collegiate status by the 1st Lord Hamilton in 1451, it continued in use after the Reformation in 1560 as the local parish church and burial-ground. With the opening of Hamilton Old Parish Church in 1734, the medieval church was demolished, with the exception of the east end and the attached aisle which served as the burial vault of the ducal family. In 1852 the remains of the 12 members of the family buried there were moved to Hamilton Mausoleum and the east end and aisle were demolished.

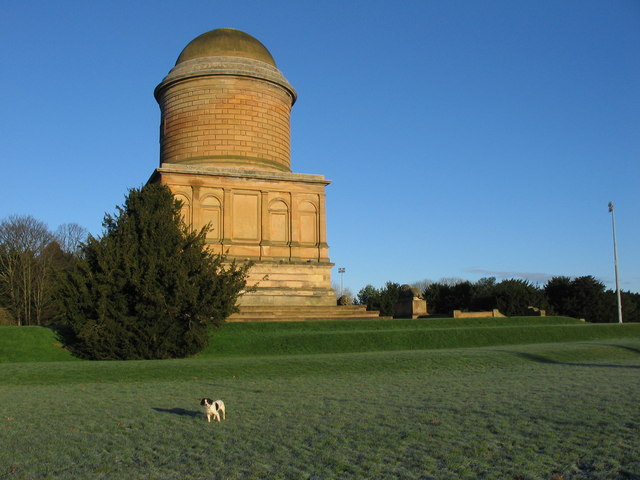
Hamilton Mausoleum

=== Hamilton Mausoleum ===
In line with his grandiose enlargement of Hamilton Palace, Alexander, 10th Duke of Hamilton planned to redesign or replace his family burial vault which stood close to the east of the palace in the aisle of the old and dilapidated Hamilton Collegiate Church. The architects David Hamilton and Henry Edmund Goodridge both produced designs for a chapel and mausoleum on the medieval church site. Neither came to anything and in the end, in 1848, the commission eventually fell to David Bryce to build Hamilton Mausoleum on a fresh site 650 feet (200 metres) northeast of the palace.

=== Hamilton Palace Riding School ===
Built from 1837 to 1842 for the 10th Duke of Hamilton by the Edinburgh architect William Burn, what was known as the Duke's Riding School was built to replace the stables court within Hamilton Palace. In the 1920s and 1930s, the Riding School was equipped with a gymnasium and boxing ring for the Douglas and Clydesdale Amateur Boxing Club. The building was the museum of the Cameronians (Scottish Rifles) from 1983 to 1995, and is now the Low Parks Museum.

== The site today ==
The site of Hamilton Palace is now occupied by the bowling pavilion, bowling greens and car park of the Hamilton Palace Sports Ground. Most of Hamilton Palace's grounds were incorporated into Strathclyde Country Park. When the park was being constructed in 1974, vaulted cellars were discovered which may have belonged to the palace. However, these were not excavated but instead infilled with rubble. Hamilton Mausoleum still stands in Strathclyde Country Park and tours can be booked at the nearby Hamilton Low Parks Museum. The black marble chimneypiece and chimneypiece wall of the palace's Old State Drawing Room is on display in the National Museum of Scotland in Edinburgh. The Dining Room is on display at the Museum of Fine Arts in Boston. Five panels of wrought iron railings from the palace grounds can be seen outside Hamilton College. The remains of the tree-lined "Great Avenue" that linked Hamilton Palace to Chatelherault hunting lodge can still be seen. These give the visitor a good indication, particularly from Chatelherault Country Park, of where the palace stood.

== Gallery ==
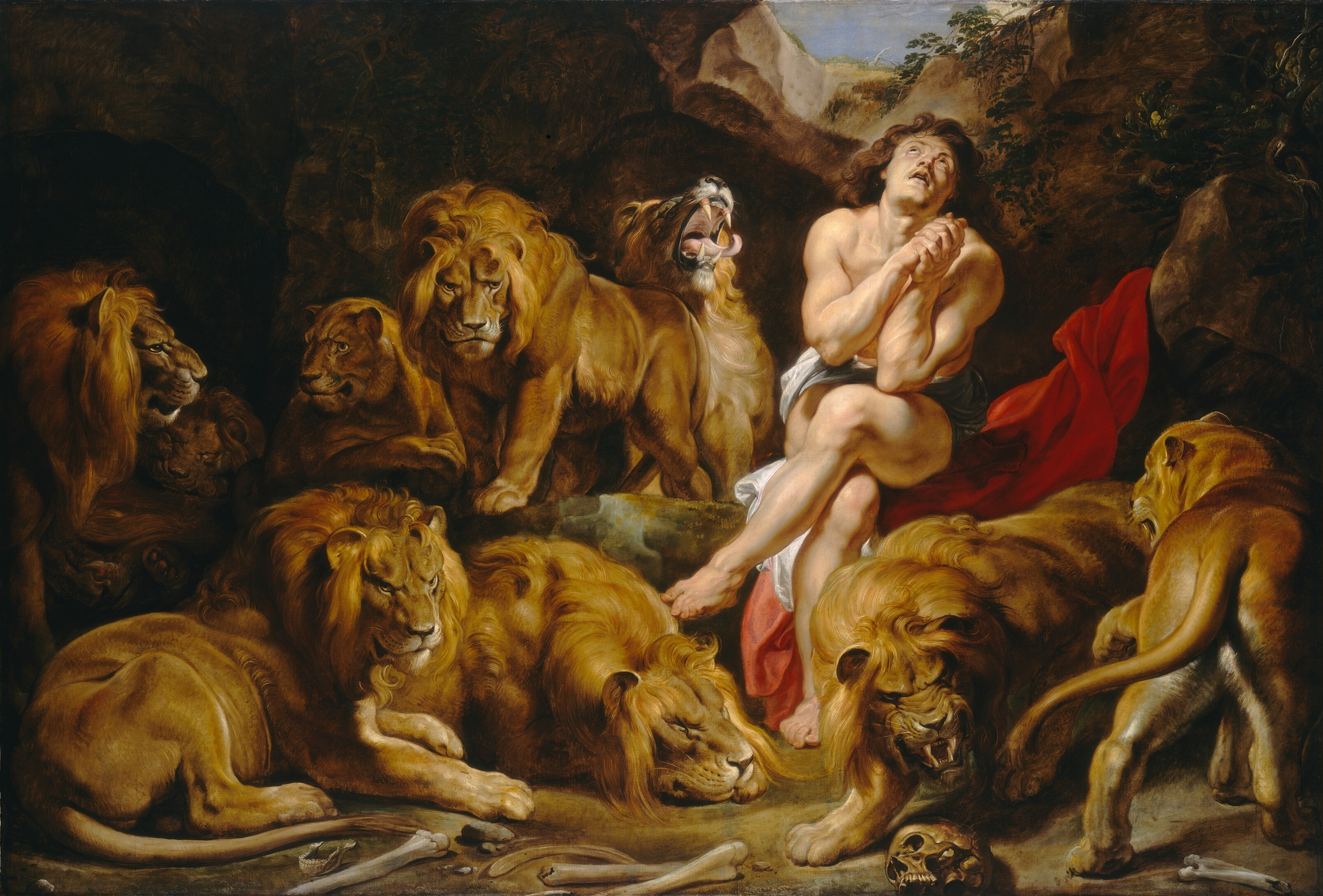
Daniel in the Lions' Den by Peter Paul Rubens, which hung in the Long Gallery until it was sold to Viscount Cowdray in 1919

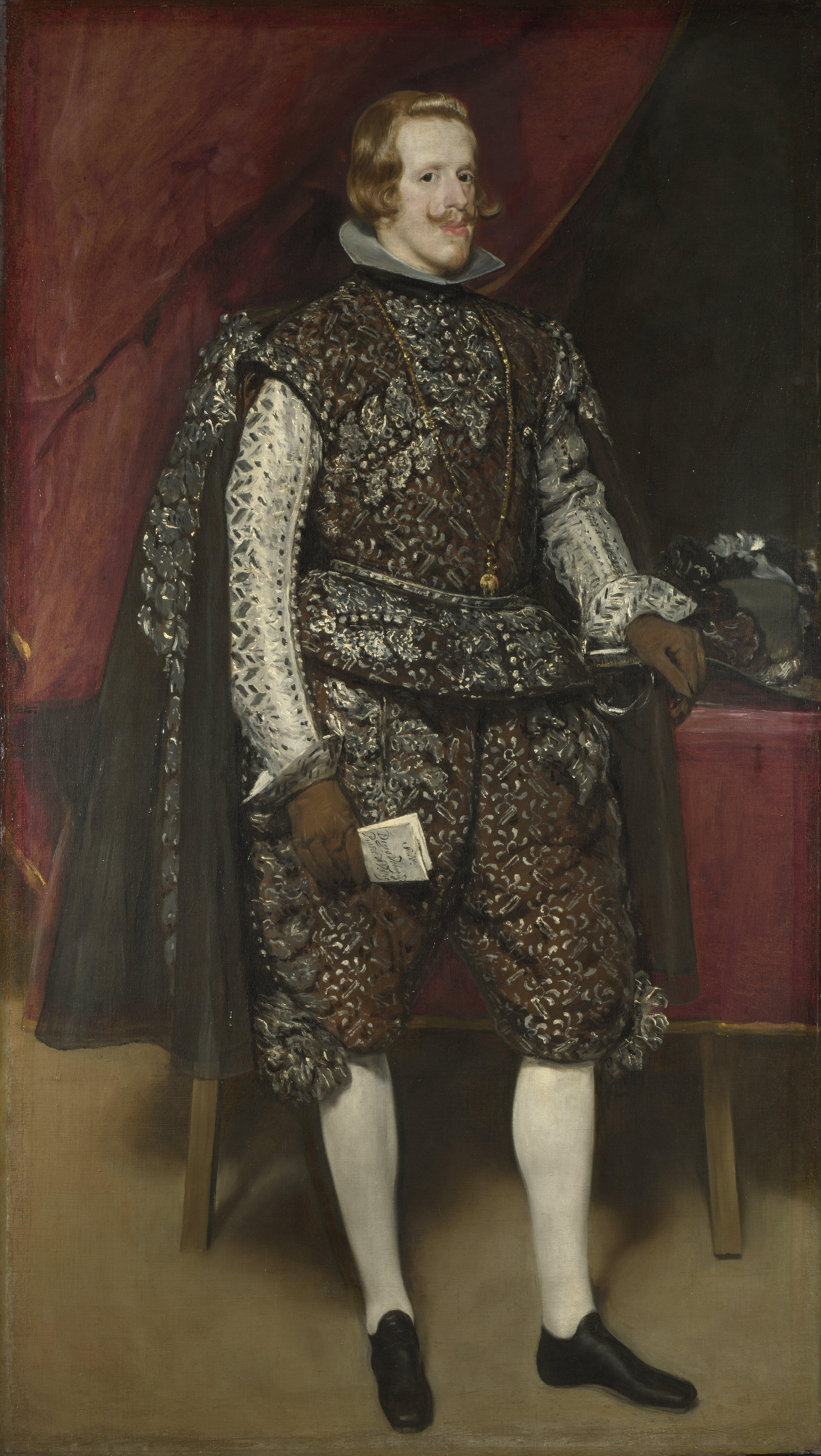
Philip IV in Brown and Silver by Diego Velázquez, sold to the National Gallery in 1882

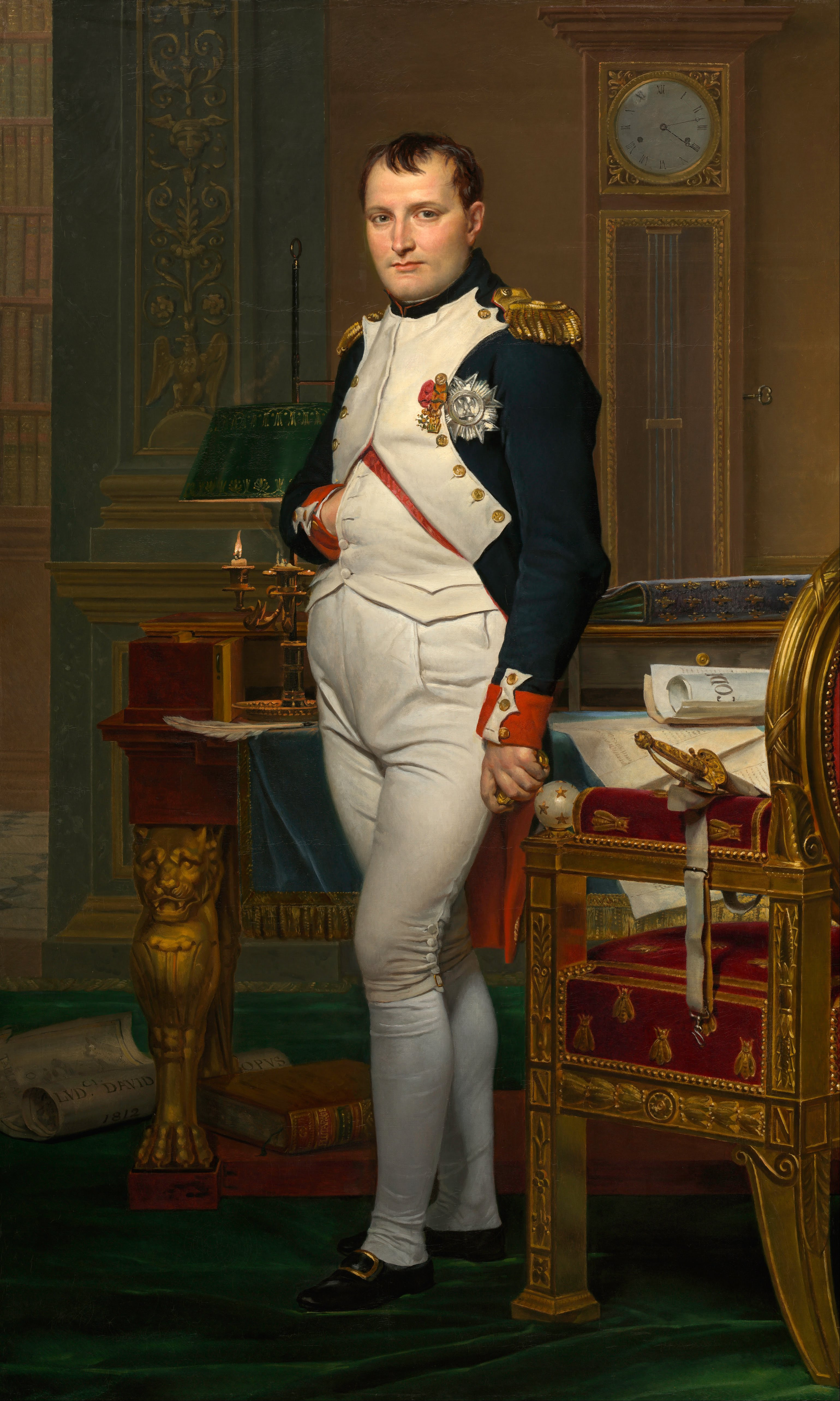
The Emperor Napoleon in His Study at the Tuileries by Jacques-Louis David, which hung in the Billiard Room and later the Dining Room from 1812 until it was sold to the Earl of Rosebery in 1882

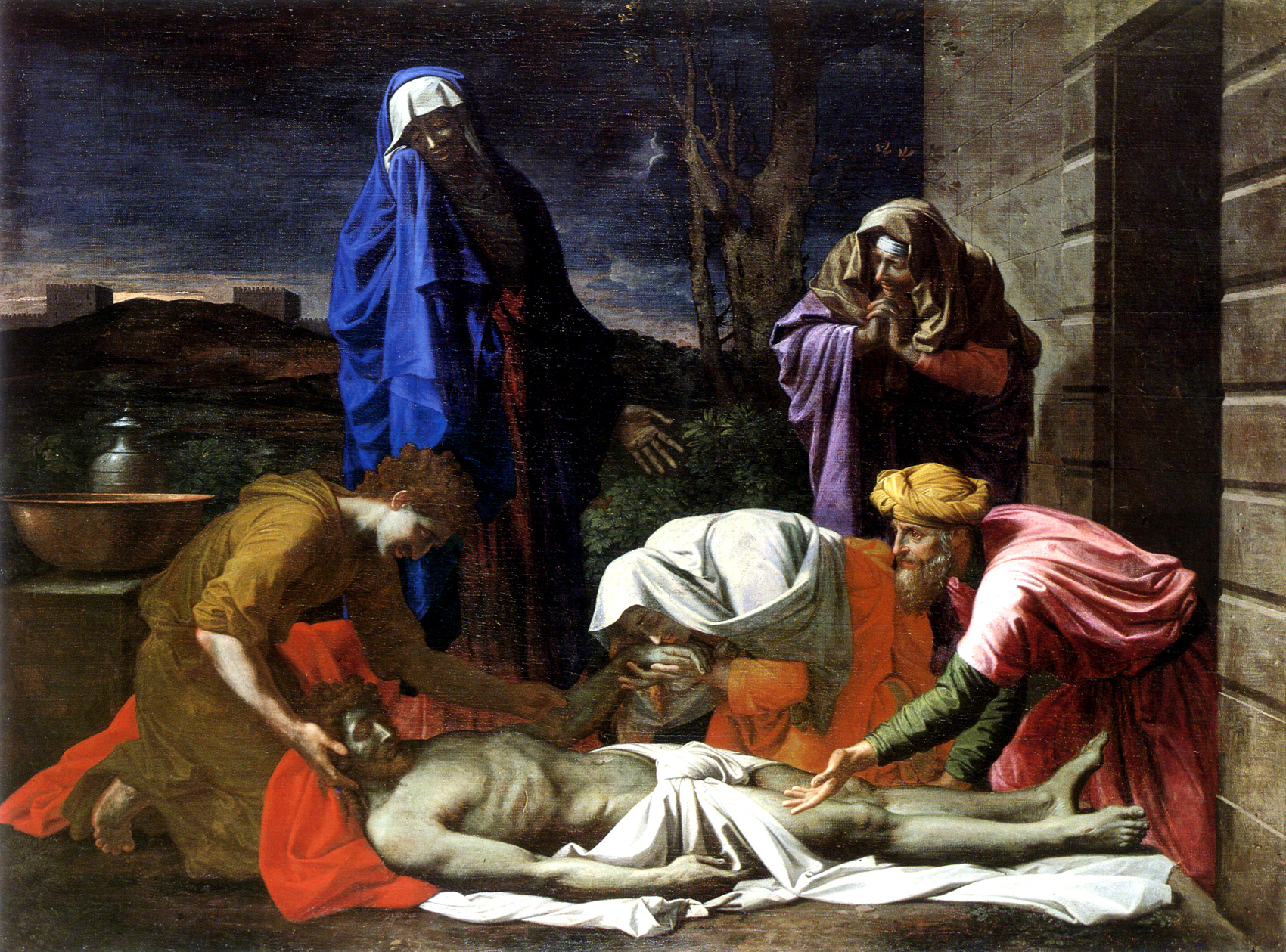
Lamentation over the dead Christ by Nicolas Poussin, which hung in the Old Drawing Room until it was sold to the National Gallery of Ireland in 1882

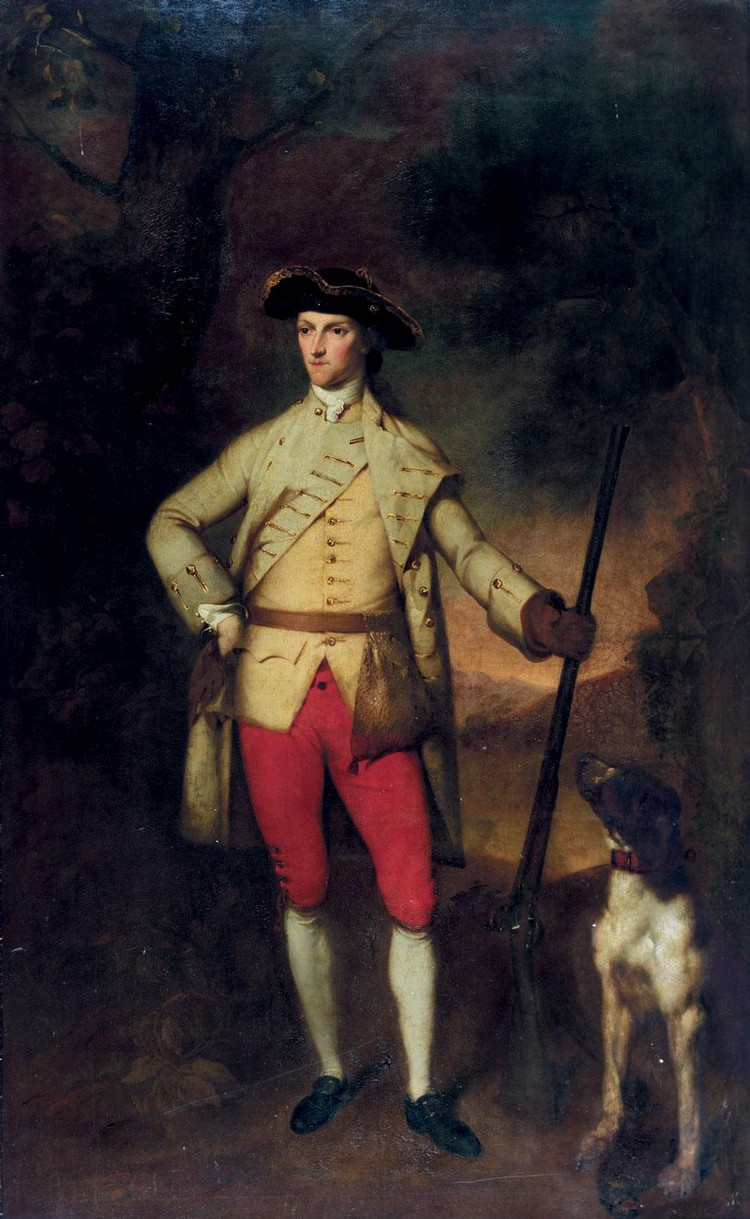
Portrait of James Hamilton, 6th Duke of Hamilton by Gavin Hamilton, which hung in the Long Gallery

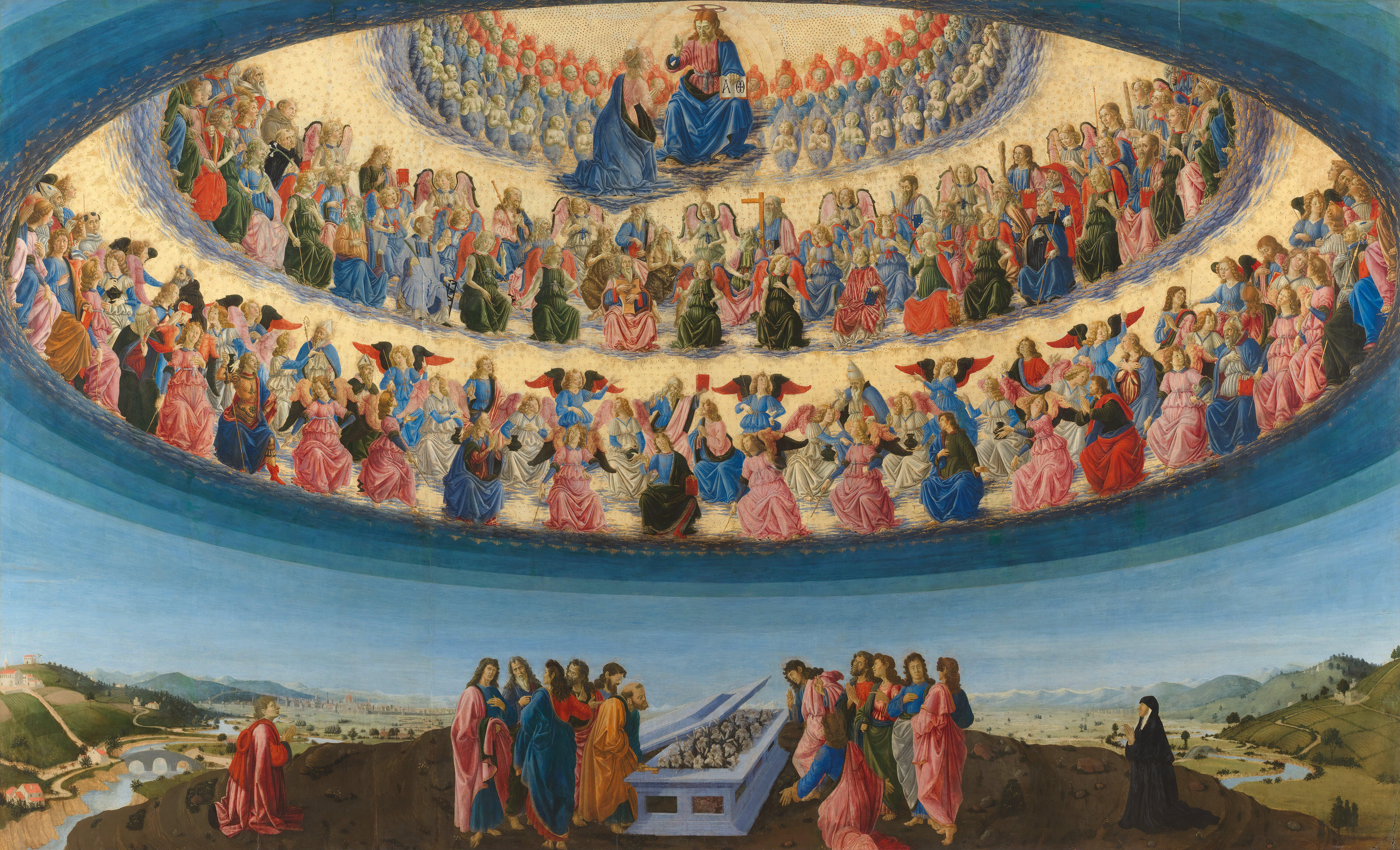
Assumption of the Virgin by Francesco Botticini, which hung in the Entrance Hall until it was sold to the National Gallery in 1882

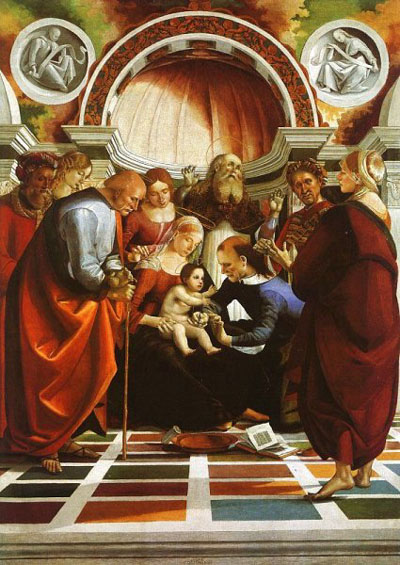
The Circumcision by Luca Signorelli, sold to the National Gallery in 1882

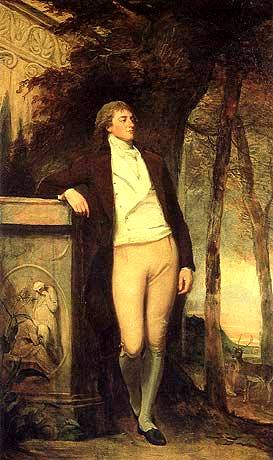
William Beckford by George Romney, sold in 1919

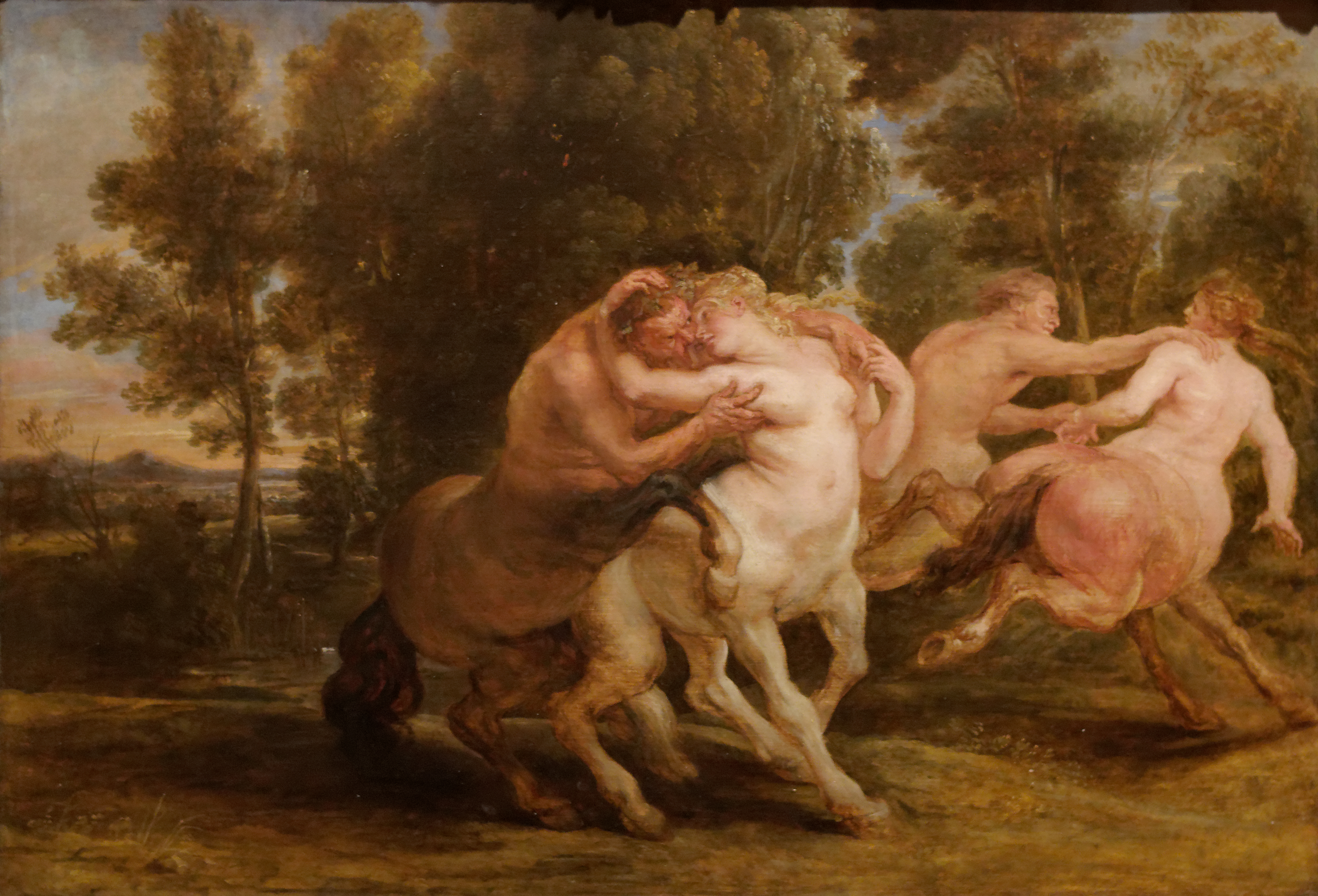
The Loves of the Centaurs by Peter Paul Rubens, sold in 1882

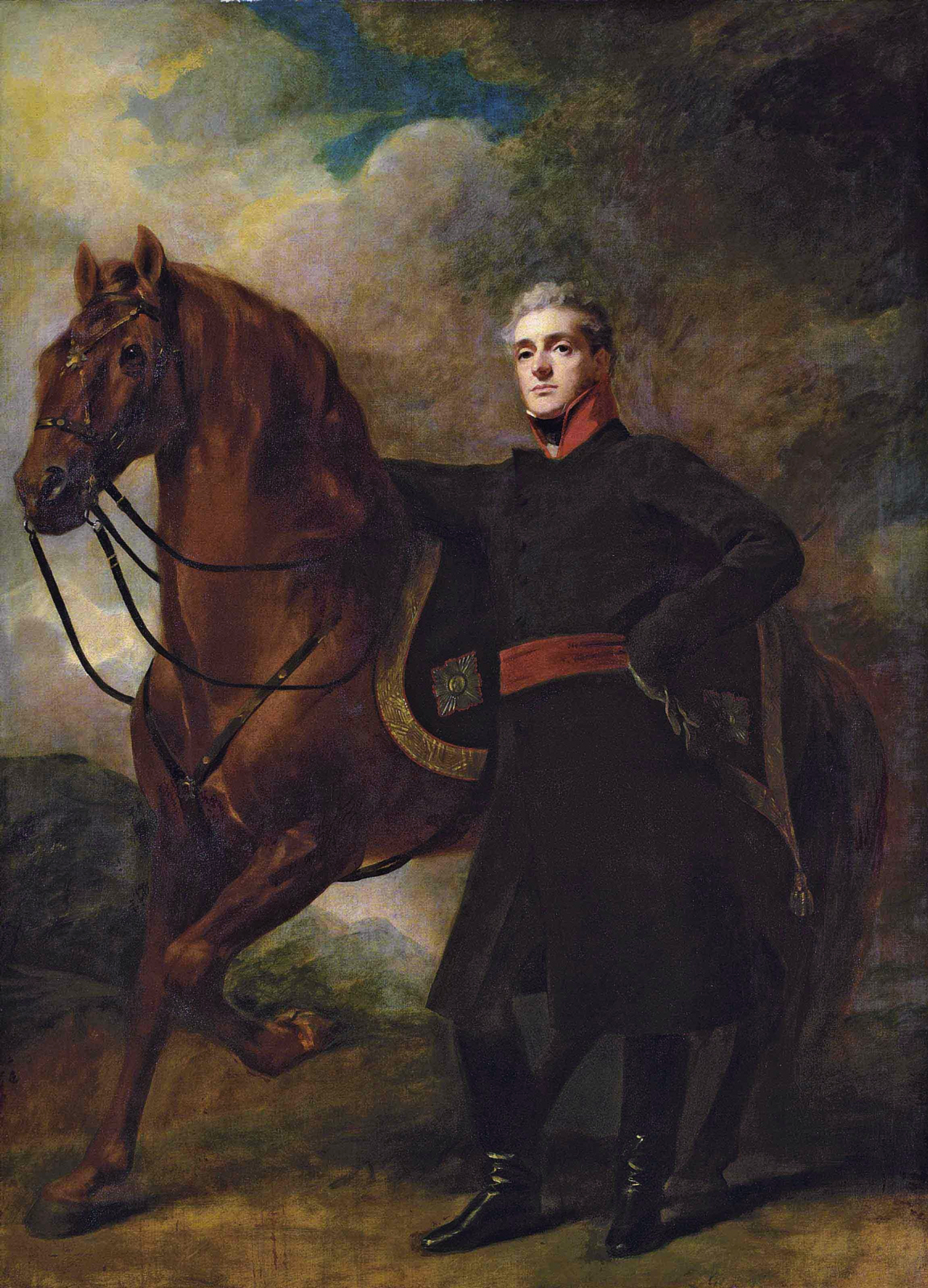
Alexander Hamilton, 10th Duke of Hamilton by Henry Raeburn, sold in 1919

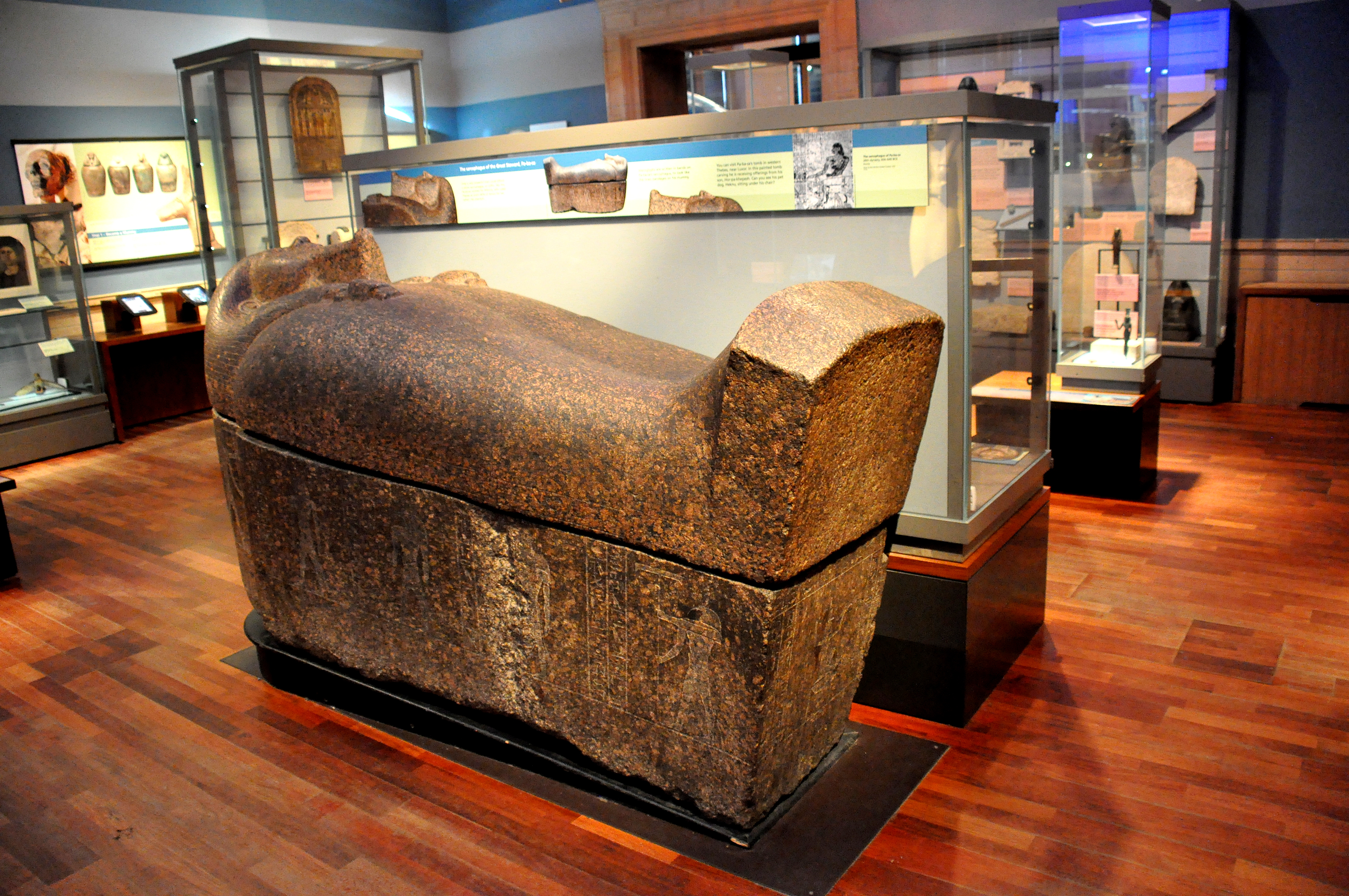
The sarcophagus of Pabasa, which was purchased by the 10th Duke and stood in the Egyptian Hall. It was presented to Kelvingrove Art Gallery and Museum in 1922

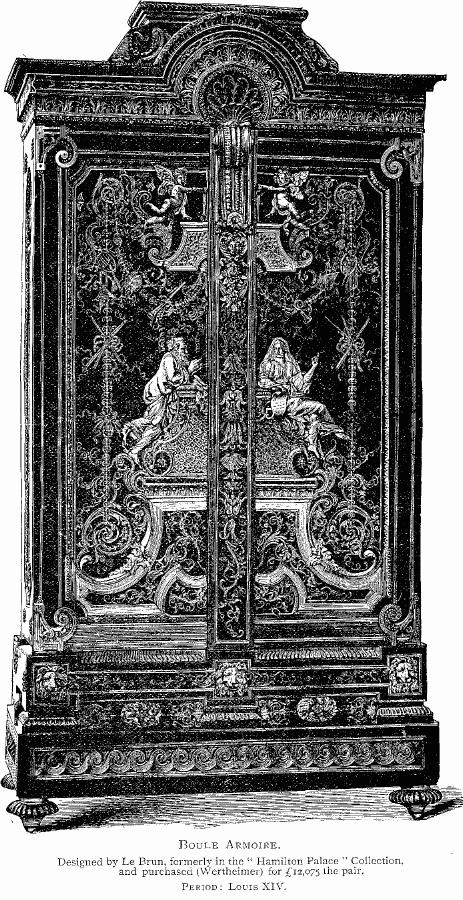
A Louis XIV armoire sold in 1882, and now in the Louvre

== See also ==
- Strathclyde Country Park
- Chatelherault Country Park
- Ashton Hall - Lancashire seat of the Dukes of Hamilton (1698–1853)
- Brodick Castle - Isle of Arran seat of the Duke of Hamilton (1510–1895)
- Cadzow Castle - original seat of the Hamilton family
- Dungavel House - seat of the Dukes of Hamilton (1919–1947)
- Ferne House - Wiltshire seat of the Dukes of Hamilton (1914–1951)
- Kinneil House - Linlithgowshire seat of the Hamilton family
- Lennoxlove House - seat of the Duke of Hamilton
