= Lady Susan Hamilton =

Scottish aristocrat

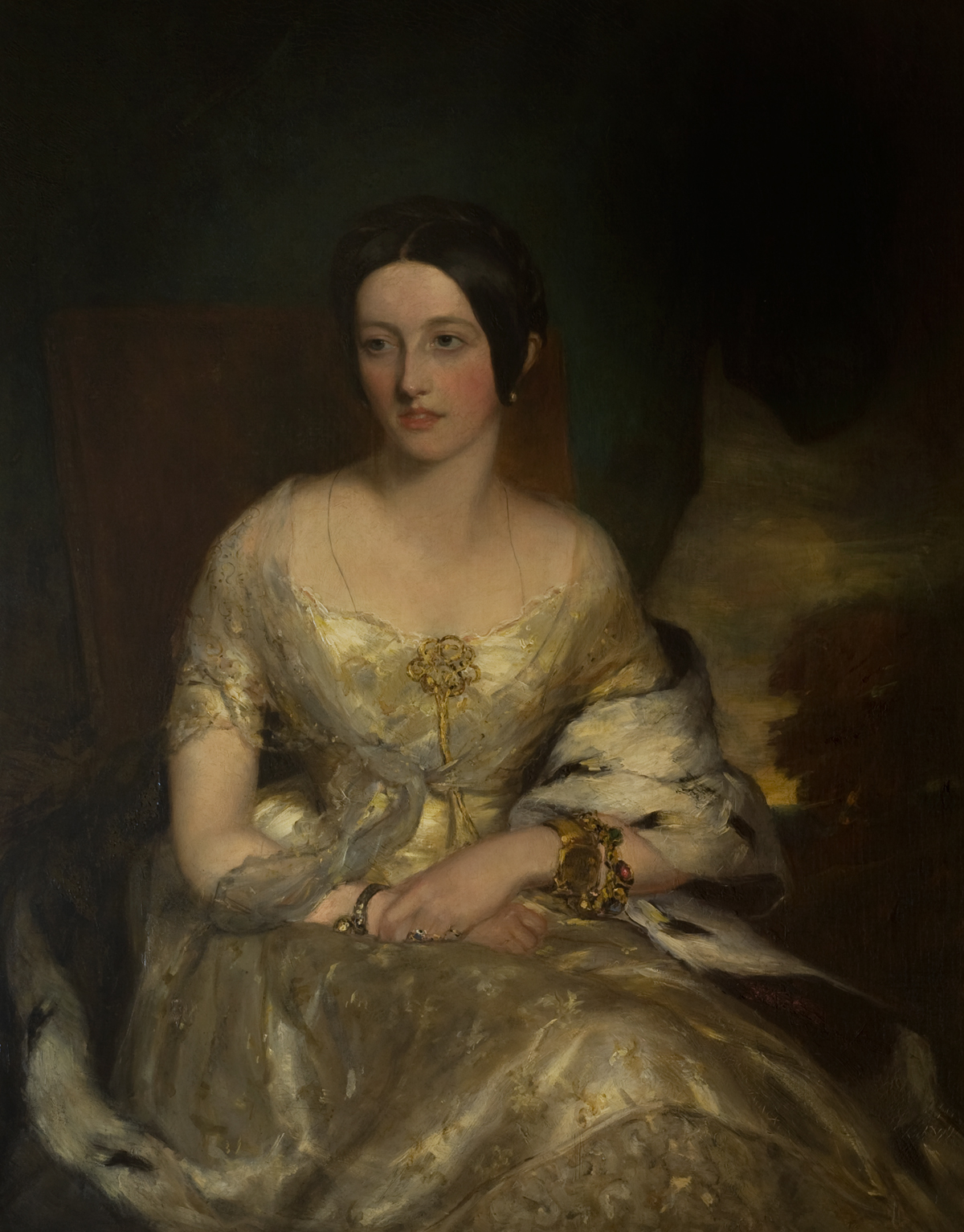
- Lady Susan Hamilton, by Francis Grant
- Other names: Lady Susan Opdebeck; Susan Pelham-Clinton, Duchess of Newcastle
- Born: Hon. Susan Harriet Catherine Hamilton; 9 June 1814; Château La Tour, Vevey, Switzerland
- Died: 28 November 1889 (aged 75)
- Spouses: Henry Pelham-Clinton, 5th Duke of Newcastle (m. 1832; div. 1850) Jean Opdebeck (m. 1870)
- Issue: Henry Pelham-Clinton, 6th Duke of Newcastle-under-Lyne; Lord Edward Clinton; Lady Susan Vane-Tempest; Lord Arthur Pelham-Clinton; Lord Albert Pelham-Clinton
- Father: Alexander Hamilton, 10th Duke of Hamilton
- Mother: Susan Euphemia Beckford

Lady Susan Harriet Catherine Hamilton (9 June 1814 – 28 November 1889) was a Scottish aristocrat. The daughter of Alexander Hamilton, 10th Duke of Hamilton, and Susan Euphemia Beckford, she at once was a star of high society. She attracted controversy after a high-profile divorce suit from the future Duke of Newcastle.

== Marriage ==
She married Henry Pelham-Clinton, heir to the 4th Duke of Newcastle, on 27 November 1832 at Hamilton Palace, Lanarkshire. She was afterwards known as the Countess of Lincoln, the Earl of Lincoln being the courtesy title held by the eldest son of the Duke of Newcastle.

They had five children:

- Henry Pelham-Clinton, 6th Duke of Newcastle-under-Lyne (25 January 1834 – 22 February 1879), who married Henrietta Adela Hope (11 April 1843 – 8 May 1913) on 11 February 1861 and had five children.
- Lord Edward William Pelham-Clinton (11 August 1836 – 9 July 1907), who married Matilda Jane Cradock-Hartopp (died 23 October 1892) on 22 August 1865.
- Lady Susan Charlotte Catherine Pelham-Clinton (7 April 1839 – 6 September 1875), who married Lord Adolphus Vane-Tempest (2 July 1825 – 11 June 1864) on 23 April 1860. She was a mistress of Edward VII of the United Kingdom when he was Prince of Wales.
- Lord Arthur Pelham-Clinton (23 June 1840 – 18 June 1870) who died, possibly by suicide, after being charged in the Boulton and Park case.
- Lord Albert Sidney Pelham-Clinton (22 December 1845 – 1 March 1884), who married Mrs Frances Evelyn Stotherd on 17 November 1870; they were divorced in 1877.

== Divorce and later life ==
Lady Lincoln then lost interest in her husband and started a disastrous affair with Horatio Walpole. They eloped to escape her possessive and domineering husband when Susan was unwell. Despite the scandal her husband wanted her to return and William Gladstone volunteered to take letters to her asking for her to return. Gladstone found her, but gave up the task when he realised that she was pregnant. She gave birth to an illegitimate son, also named Horatio. It was a short-lived affair ending sadly in embittered circumstances. Divorce proceedings were commenced by an outraged Duke, citing the co-respondent Walpole in a writ. She was certainly well-known to the brilliant divorce and Whiggish barrister Lord Brougham, whose correspondence in the National Archives cites her to Samuel Rogers in a number of letters at the time of the proceedings in the early 1850s.

I have letters from Lady Susan Hamilton, now at Venice, which show all the stories of Walpole having left her to be pure fabrications, as I always believed they would turn out to be,

he opined smugly with the ominous intent. How he came to be in possession of the letters is evidently due to Lady Susan's application to Brougham for client advice. Although Brougham did not think that she was personally in fear for her life from domestic violence, he did conclude the letter with

I rely for my view on the universal fear of violence which constrains all parties.

Brougham had represented Queen Caroline in the famous case of 1820 and he was now an old man, but it was clear she was frightened. In a similar vein Brougham showed how he was concerned for female safety later in March 1853,

Lady Susan Hamilton is on her way home. I saw the Duchess—her mother—to-day quite well.

In 1857 William Ewart Gladstone was attacked for speaking out against violation of women when he became embroiled in the court action for the Lincoln-Oxford case held in Chancery. Divorce proceedings frequently dragged on for years, so that Susan was unable to get remarried for a full decade afterwards. The unhappy Lady Susan married again, to an untitled Belgian, a commoner named Jean Alexis Opdebeck from the city of Mechelen at Naples on 6 December 1862. Her ex-husband, by then the 5th Duke of Newcastle, had died in October 1864, aged 53, and was succeeded in the dukedom by their eldest son, Henry.

Lady Susan was one of those rescued by Gladstone's work for distressed womenfolk. The exact state of his involvement is mysterious, but it was clear that felt by the late 1880s that he had lost touch with the younger generation whose appetites far exceeded his own. On occasion he misunderstood his secretary devoted and loyal daughter Mary (Mrs Drew). Susan's fall from grace and tragic death had stirred great sympathy in the Grand Old Man. An article in The Argus three days after her death blaming the Walpole family as typical — "obstinate", "irritating" behaviour as a well-known trait in the Walpole dynasty.
