= Willis Maddox =

English painter

- Born: 1813; Bath, Somerset, England
- Died: 26 June 1853 (aged 39–40); Pera, near Constantinople
- Other names: Willes Maddox
- Occupation: painter
- Known for: painted several sacred pictures
- Notable work: The Annunciation, The Temptation, The Agony in the Garden

Willis or Willes Maddox (1813 – 26 June 1853) was an English painter.

== Life ==
Willis Maddox was born at Bath in 1813. In early life he was patronised by William Beckford the Younger of Fonthill, for whom he painted several sacred pictures, such as The Annunciation, The Temptation, The Agony in the Garden, and others. He exhibited for the first time at the Royal Academy in 1844, sending a painting of a piece of still life which passed into Beckford's collection. In 1847 he exhibited his first important picture, Naomi, Ruth, and Orpah; in 1849 he sent a portrait of Halil Aga Riskalla, and in 1850, one of the Turkish ambassadors, Mehemet Ali. In 1852 he sent Aina Tellet, or the Light of the Mirror, and a portrait of the Duke of Hamilton. Owing to his success in painting the portraits of distinguished Turks, Maddox was invited to Constantinople to paint the Sultan, for whom he executed several portraits. He died of fever at Pera, near Constantinople, on 26 June 1853. Maddox painted several good portraits, of which there are many examples at Bath and at Bristol.
