= Susan Hamilton, Duchess of Hamilton =

British noble (1786–1859)

Her Grace The Duchess of Hamilton
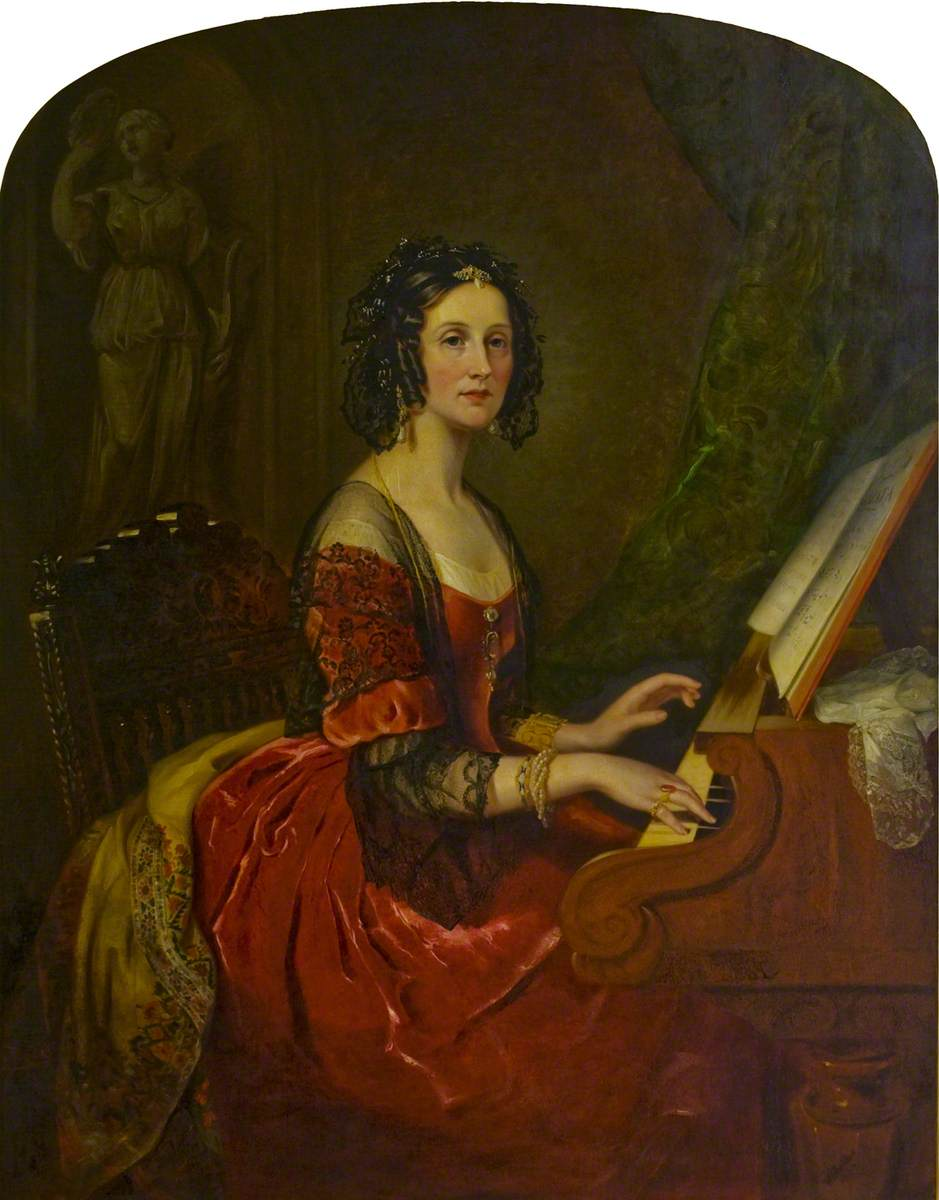
- Portrait by Willis Maddox

Duchess of Hamilton
- Reign: 16 February 1819 – 18 August 1852 (33 years, 184 days)
- Predecessor: Harriet Stewart
- Successor: Marie Amelie of Baden
- Born: Susan(na) Euphemia Beckford; 14 May 1786; Château La Tour, Vevey, Switzerland
- Died: 27 May 1859 (aged 73)
- Spouse: Alexander Hamilton, 10th Duke of Hamilton (m. 1810; died 1852)
- Issue: William Hamilton, 11th Duke of Hamilton; Lady Susan Hamilton
- Father: William Thomas Beckford
- Mother: Lady Margaret Gordon

Susan Hamilton, Duchess of Hamilton (14 May 1786 – 27 May 1859), formerly Susan(na) Euphemia Beckford, was the wife of Alexander Hamilton, 10th Duke of Hamilton, and the mother of the 11th Duke.

Susan was born at Château La Tour, in Vevey, Switzerland. She was the daughter of William Thomas Beckford and his wife, the former Lady Margaret Gordon. Beckford was an art collector who made his home at Fonthill Abbey in Wiltshire. He was the son of a Lord Mayor of London, William Beckford (whose wife, Maria Hamilton, was a descendant of James Hamilton, Duke of Châtellerault, as was her future grandson-in-law). Lady Margaret was the only surviving daughter of Charles Gordon, 4th Earl of Aboyne.

Susan Beckford married the future duke, then a former MP and styled Marquess of Douglas and Clydesdale, on 26 April 1810 in London.

They had two children:

- William Hamilton, 11th Duke of Hamilton, who married Princess Marie Amelie of Baden and had children;
- Lady Susan Hamilton, who married twice: she had children by her first husband, Henry Pelham-Clinton, 5th Duke of Newcastle, but none by her second, Jean Alexis Op de Beeck.

Her daughter, also named Susan, caused the duke and duchess some concern by eloping with Horatio Walpole, by whom she had an illegitimate child, born in 1849. She lived abroad with Walpole for a time but returned to Britain in 1853.

The dowager duchess was a patron of the arts whose acquaintances included Alfred, Lord Tennyson. She inherited many of her father's works of art.
