= Alexander Hamilton, 10th Duke of Hamilton =

Scottish politician

His Grace The Duke of Hamilton KG PC FRS FSA
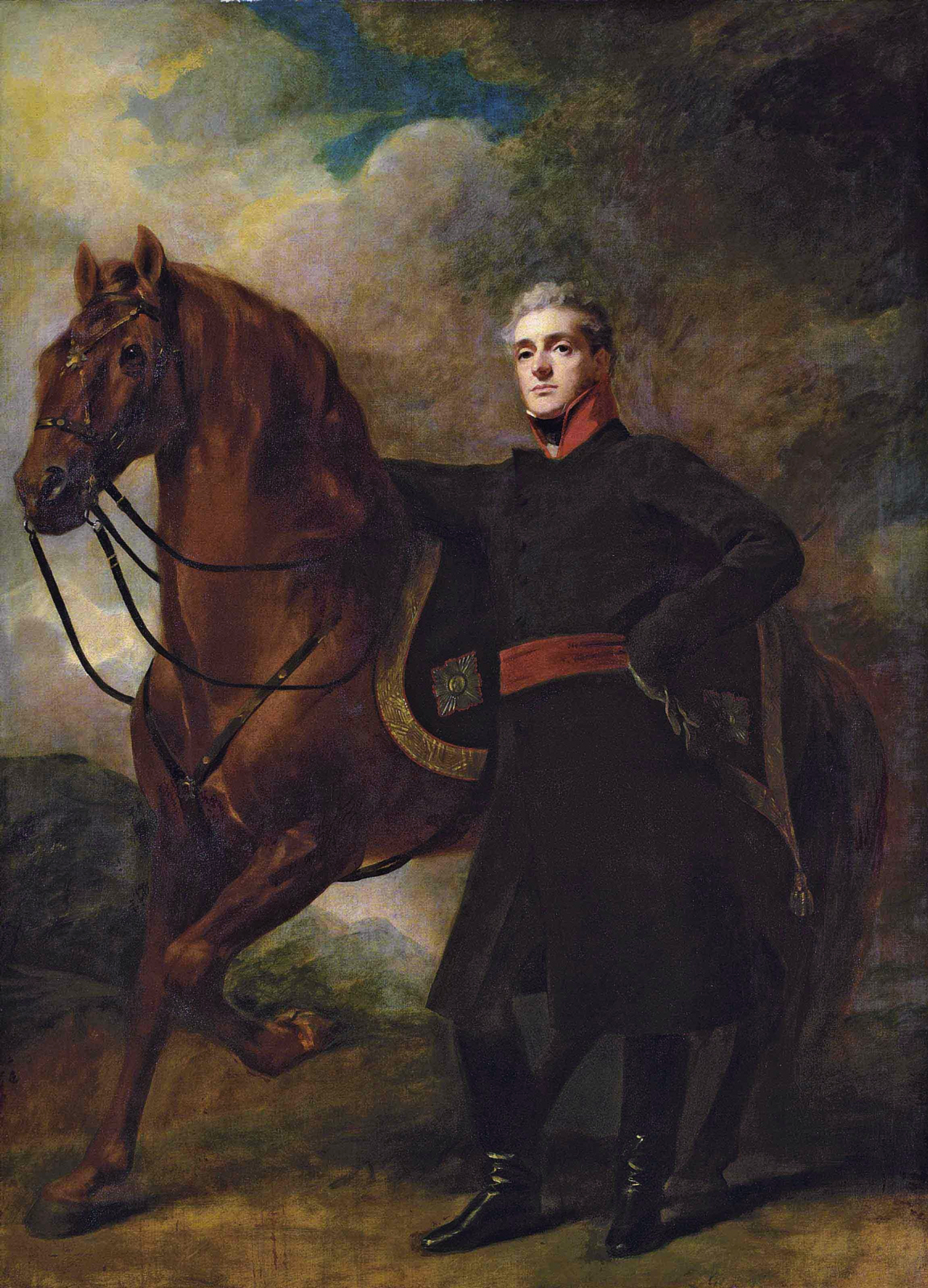
- The 10th Duke of Hamilton, by Henry Raeburn

10th Duke of Hamilton 7th Duke of Brandon
- Tenure: 1819–1852
- Predecessor: Archibald Hamilton
- Successor: William Hamilton
- Born: 3 October 1767; St James's Square, London, England
- Died: 18 August 1852 (aged 84); 12 Portman Square, London, England
- Buried: Bent Cemetery, Hamilton, South Lanarkshire
- Offices: Lord Lieutenant of Lanarkshire
- Spouse: Susan Euphemia Beckford
- Issue: William Hamilton, 11th Duke of Hamilton; Lady Susan de Beeck
- Parents: Archibald Hamilton, 9th Duke of Hamilton; Lady Harriet Stewart

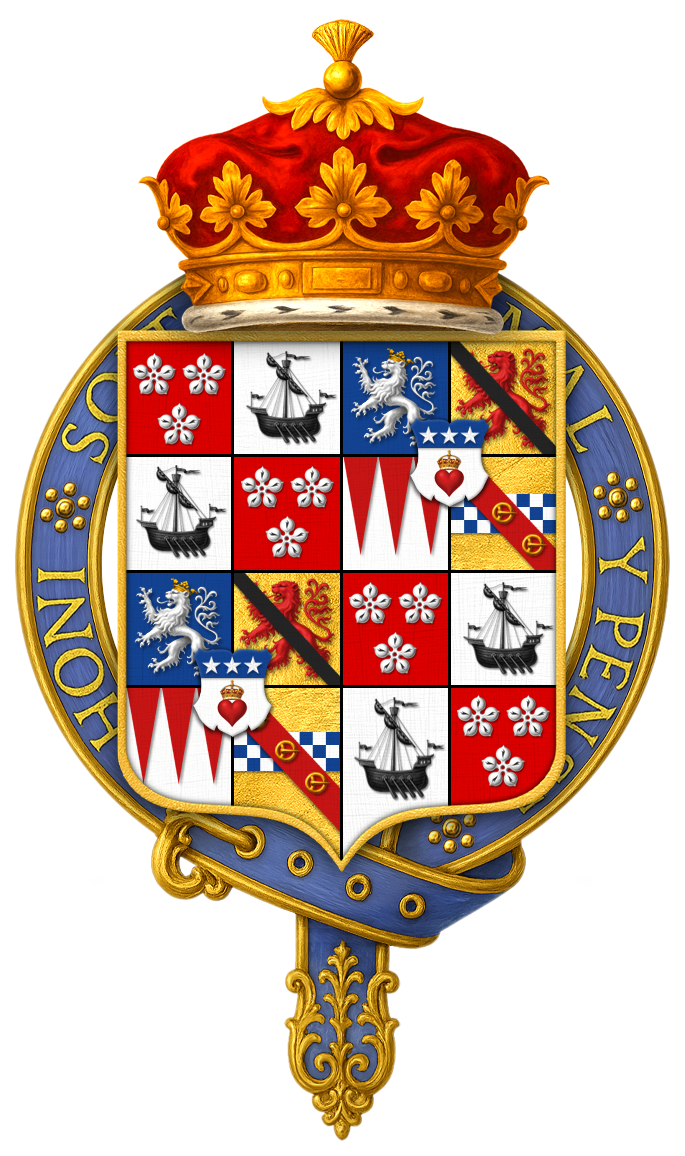
Quartered arms of Alexander Hamilton, 10th Duke of Hamilton, KG

Alexander Hamilton, 10th Duke of Hamilton, 7th Duke of Brandon (3 October 1767 – 18 August 1852), styled as Earl of Angus until 1799 and Marquess of Douglas and Clydesdale from 1799–1819, was a Scottish politician and art collector.

== Life ==
Born on 3 October 1767 at St James's Square, London, the eldest son of Archibald Hamilton, 9th Duke of Hamilton, he was educated at Harrow School and at Christ Church, Oxford, where he matriculated on 4 March 1786. He received his MA on 18 February 1789.

Hamilton was a Whig, and his political career began in 1802, when he became MP for Lancaster. He remained in the House of Commons until 1806, when he was appointed to the Privy Council, and Ambassador to the court of St Petersburg until 1807; additionally, he was Lord Lieutenant of Lanarkshire from 1802 to 1852. He received the numerous titles at his father's death in 1819. He was Lord High Steward at the coronation of William IV and Adelaide in 1831 and the coronation of Victoria in 1838, and remains the last person to have undertaken this duty twice. He became a Knight of the Garter in 1836. He held the office of Grand Master Mason of the Freemasons of Scotland between 1820 and 1822. He held the office of President of the Highland and Agricultural Society of Scotland between 1827 and 1831. He held the office of Trustee of the British Museum between 1834 and 1852.

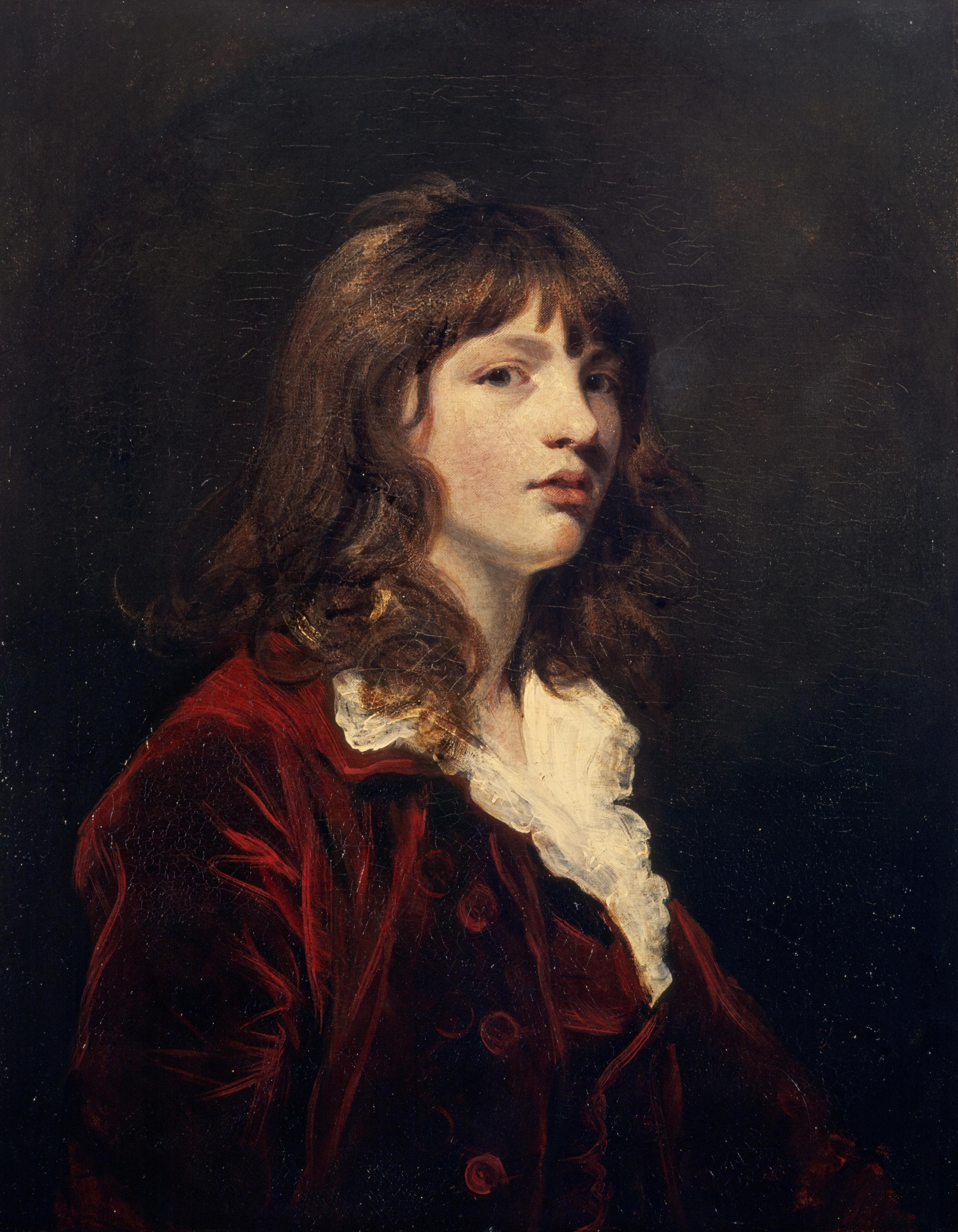
Alexander Hamilton at age 15, in a painting by Joshua Reynolds

He married Susan Euphemia Beckford, daughter of William Thomas Beckford and Lady Margaret Gordon, daughter of Charles Gordon, 4th Earl of Aboyne, on 26 April 1810 in London, England.

Hamilton was a well-known dandy of his day. An obituary notice states that "timidity and variableness of temperament prevented his rendering much service to, or being much relied on by his party ... With a great predisposition to over-estimate the importance of ancient birth ... he well deserved to be considered the proudest man in England." He also supported Napoleon and commissioned the painting The Emperor Napoleon in His Study at the Tuileries by Jacques-Louis David.

Lord Lamington, in The Days of the Dandies, wrote of him that 'never was such a magnifico as the 10th Duke, the Ambassador to the Empress Catherine; when I knew him he was very old, but held himself straight as any grenadier. He was always dressed in a military laced undress coat, tights and Hessian boots, &c'. Lady Stafford in letters to her son mentioned 'his great Coat, long Queue, and Fingers cover'd with gold Rings', and his foreign appearance. According to another obituary in The Gentleman's Magazine, he had 'an intense family pride'.

== Death and legacy ==
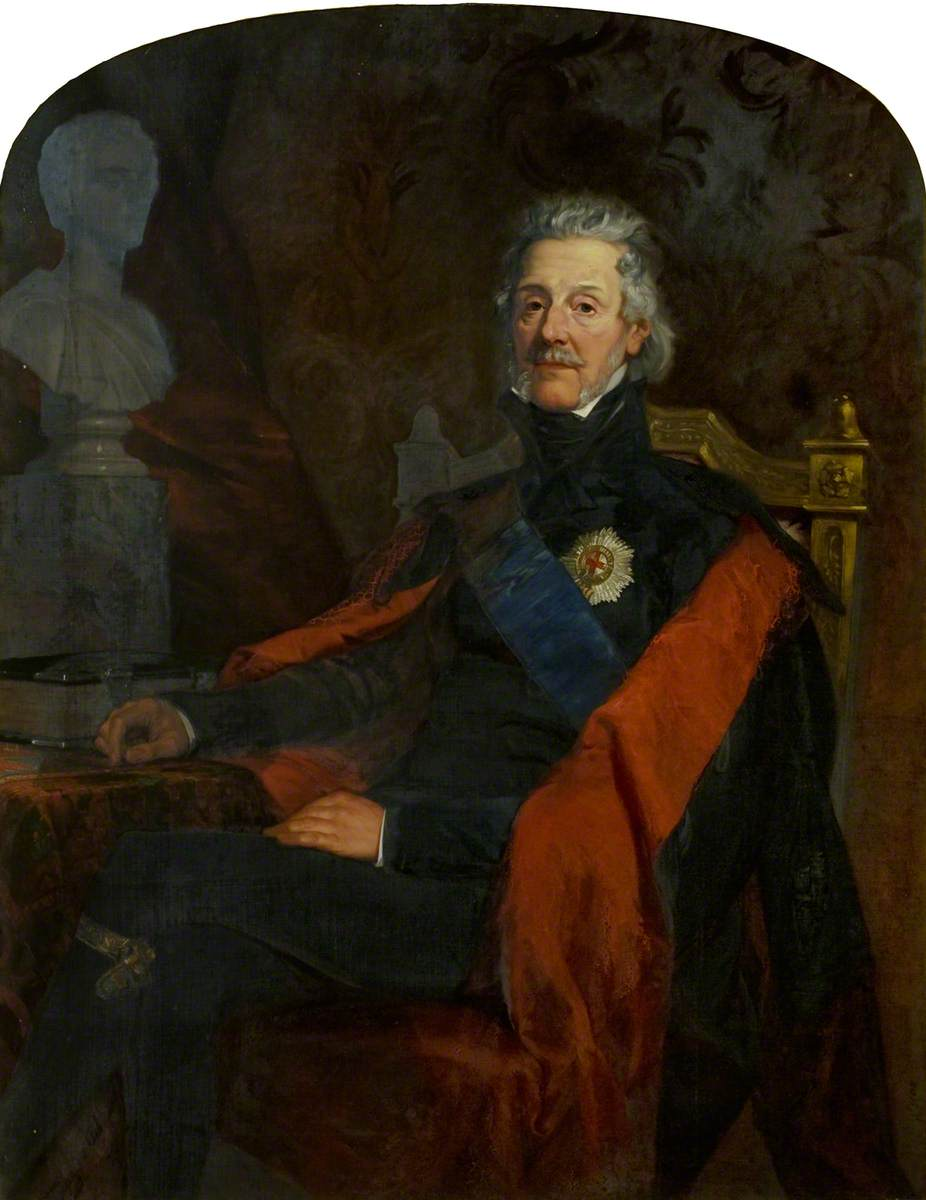
Portrait by Willis Maddox (1852)

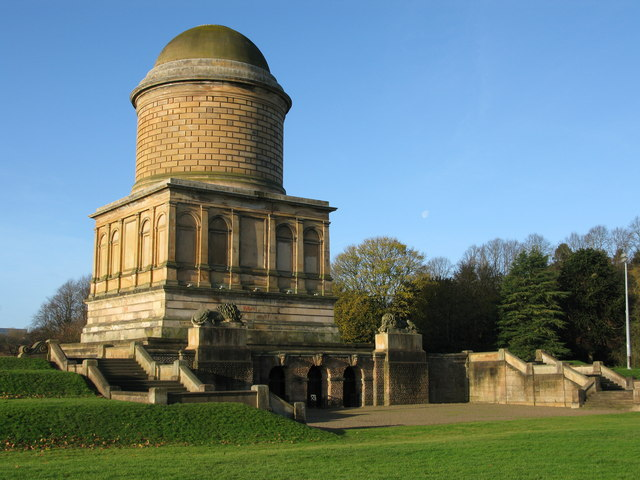
Hamilton Mausoleum

Hamilton had a strong interest in Ancient Egyptian mummies, and was so impressed with the work of mummy expert Thomas Pettigrew that he arranged for Pettigrew to mummify him after his death. He died on 18 August 1852 at age 84 at 12 Portman Square, London, England and was buried on 4 September 1852 at Hamilton Palace, Hamilton, Scotland. In accordance with his wishes, Hamilton's body was mummified after his death and placed in a sarcophagus of the Ptolemaic period that he had originally acquired in Paris in 1836 ostensibly for the British Museum. At the same time he had acquired the sarcophagus of Pabasa, an important nobleman which is now in the Kelvingrove Museum. In 1842 Hamilton had begun construction of the Hamilton Mausoleum as repository for the overcrowded family vault at the Palace. He was interred there with other Dukes of Hamilton, from the 1858 completion of the Mausoleum until 1921 when subsidence and the subsequent demolition of the Palace forced removal of the bodies to the Bent Cemetery in Hamilton, where he still lies buried in his sarcophagus.

His collection of paintings, objects, books and manuscripts was sold for £397,562 in July 1882. The manuscripts were purchased by the German government for £80,000. Some were repurchased by the British government and are now in the British Museum.

== Marriage and issue ==
In 1810, Hamilton married Susan Euphemia Beckford, daughter of novelist William Beckford of Fonthill Abbey, Wiltshire, by Lady Margaret Gordon, daughter of the 4th Earl of Aboyne

By his wife, Hamilton had one son and one daughter:

- William Hamilton, 11th Duke of Hamilton (1811–1863), who married Princess Marie Amelie of Baden
- Lady Susan Hamilton (1814–1899), who married 1st, Henry Pelham-Clinton, 5th Duke of Newcastle; 2nd, Jean Alexis Op de Beeck of Brussels.

== Ancestry ==
Ancestors of Alexander Hamilton, 10th Duke of Hamilton

8. James Hamilton, 4th Duke of Hamilton
4. James Hamilton, 5th Duke of Hamilton
9. The Hon. Elizabeth Gerard
2. Archibald Hamilton, 9th Duke of Hamilton
10. Edward Spencer
5. Anne Spencer
11. Anne Baker
1. Alexander Hamilton, 10th Duke of Hamilton
12. James Stewart, 5th Earl of Galloway
6. Alexander Stewart, 6th Earl of Galloway
13. Lady Catherine Montgomerie
3. Lady Harriet Stewart
14. John Cochrane, 4th Earl of Dundonald
7. Lady Catherine Cochrane
15. Lady Anne Murray

Parliament of the United Kingdom
Preceded by John Dent; Richard Penn	Member of Parliament for Lancaster; 1802–1806; With: John Dent	Succeeded by John Dent; John Fenton-Cawthorne
Diplomatic posts
Preceded by The Earl Cathcart	British Ambassador to Russia; 1807	Succeeded by Lord Granville Leveson-Gower
Honorary titles
Preceded by The 9th Duke of Hamilton	Lord Lieutenant of Lanarkshire; 1802–1852	Succeeded by The 11th Duke of Hamilton
Masonic offices
Preceded by The Prince of Wales (George IV)	Grand Master of the Grand Lodge of Scotland; 1820–1822	Succeeded by The Duke of Argyll
Peerage of Scotland
Preceded by Archibald Hamilton	Duke of Hamilton; 1819–1852	Succeeded by William Hamilton
Peerage of Great Britain
Preceded by Archibald Hamilton	Duke of Brandon; 1819–1852	Succeeded by William Hamilton
Preceded by Archibald Hamilton	Baron Dutton (writ in acceleration); 1806–1852	Succeeded by William Hamilton
