= Henry Pelham-Clinton, 5th Duke of Newcastle =

British politician

His Grace The Duke of Newcastle KG PC
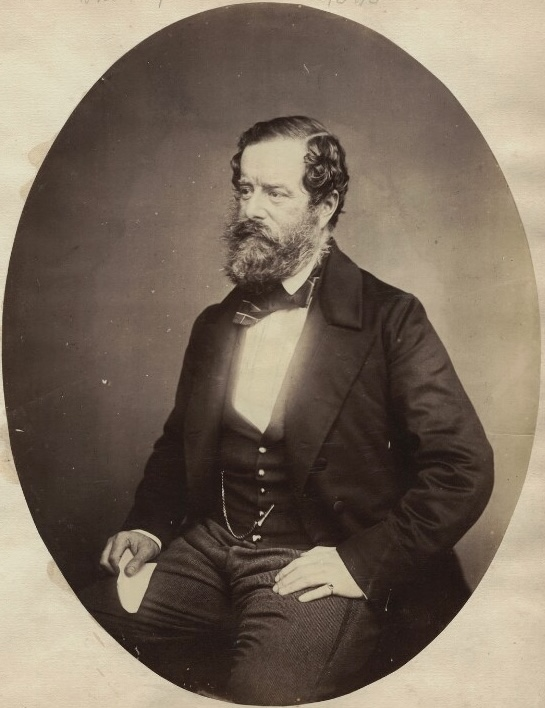
- The 5th Duke of Newcastle, c. 1860

Secretary of State for War and the Colonies
- In office 28 December 1852 – 10 June 1854
- Monarch: Victoria
- Prime Minister: The Earl of Aberdeen
- Preceded by: Sir John Pakington, Bt
- Succeeded by: Office abolished

Secretary of State for War Secretary at War
- In office 12 June 1854 – 30 January 1855
- Monarch: Victoria
- Prime Minister: The Earl of Aberdeen
- Preceded by: New office
- Succeeded by: The Lord Panmure

Secretary of State for the Colonies
- In office 18 June 1859 – 7 April 1864
- Monarch: Victoria
- Prime Minister: The Viscount Palmerston
- Preceded by: Sir Edward Lytton, Bt
- Succeeded by: Edward Cardwell

Chief Secretary for Ireland
- In office 14 February 1846 – June 1846
- Monarch: Victoria
- Prime Minister: Sir Robert Peel
- Preceded by: Sir Thomas Freemantle
- Succeeded by: Henry Labouchere

Personal details
- Born: 22 May 1811
- Died: 18 October 1864 (aged 53)
- Party: Tory (1832–1834); Conservative (1834–1846); Peelite (1846–1859); Liberal (1859–1864)
- Spouse: Lady Susan Hamilton (m. 1832; div. 1850)
- Children: Henry Pelham-Clinton, 6th Duke of Newcastle-under-Lyne; Lord Edward Clinton; Lady Susan Vane-Tempest; Lord Arthur Pelham-Clinton; Lord Albert Pelham-Clinton
- Parents: Henry Pelham-Clinton, 4th Duke of Newcastle-under-Lyne; Georgina Elizabeth Mundy
- Education: University of Oxford

Henry Pelham Fiennes Pelham-Clinton, 5th Duke of Newcastle-under-Lyne, KG, PC (22 May 1811 – 18 October 1864), styled Earl of Lincoln before 1851, was a British politician and aristocrat. He sat in Parliament for South Nottinghamshire (1832–46) and for Falkirk Burghs (1846–51) until inheriting the dukedom.

Newcastle held several key offices in the mid-19th century, including Chief Secretary for Ireland, Secretary of State for the Colonies, and Secretary of State for War and the Colonies. In 1855, he resigned as Secretary of State for War owing to disastrous casualties during the Crimean War.

== Background ==
Newcastle was the son of Henry Pelham-Clinton, 4th Duke of Newcastle-under-Lyne, by his wife Georgiana Elizabeth, daughter of Edward Miller-Mundy. He was educated at Eton and Christ Church, Oxford, where he took his B.A. degree in 1832, and was created a D.C.L. in 1863.

== Political career ==
Newcastle was returned to Parliament for South Nottinghamshire in 1832, a seat he held until 1846, and then represented Falkirk Burghs until 1851, when he succeeded his father in the dukedom. Initially a Tory, he served under Sir Robert Peel as First Commissioner of Woods and Forests from 1841 to 1846 and as Chief Secretary for Ireland in 1846, as the effects of the Great Irish Famine began to take hold. He was admitted to the British Privy Council in 1841, and to the Irish Privy Council on 14 February 1846.

Newcastle joined the Peelites in 1846, and held office in Lord Aberdeen's coalition government as Secretary of State for War and the Colonies between 1852 and 1854, and as Secretary of State for War and Secretary at War between 12 June 1854 and 1 February 1855, when he resigned over the Crimean War.

From 18 June 1859 to April 1864, he served as Secretary of State for the Colonies in Lord Palmerston's Liberal administration. In 1860, while holding this office, he went to Canada and the United States, in company with the Prince of Wales. Apart from his political career he also held the honorary posts of Lord Lieutenant of Nottinghamshire from 1857 to 1864 and Lord Warden of the Stannaries from 1862 to 1864. He was made a Knight of the Garter on 17 December 1860.

Lord Lincoln was a member of the Canterbury Association from 27 March 1848. Upon succeeding to the dukedom, he joined the association's management committee on 29 January 1851. In 1849, the chief surveyor of the Canterbury Association, Joseph Thomas, named the future town of Lincoln in New Zealand after him. The town's university was in turn also named after Lord Lincoln.

== Family ==
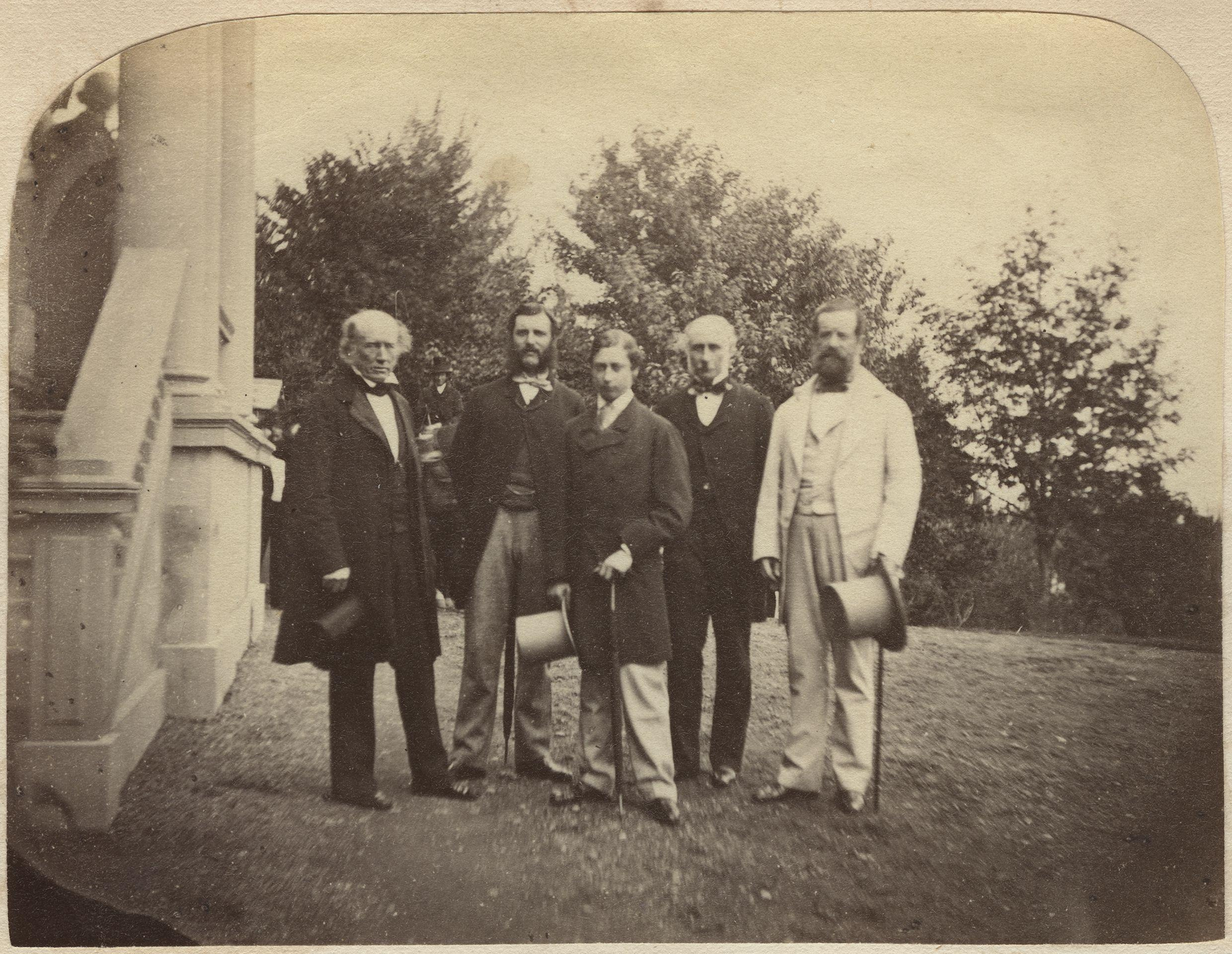
The Duke of Newcastle (right) with Sir Edmund Walker Head, 8th Baronet, Sir Christopher Teesdale, the Prince of Wales and the Hon. Robert Bruce.

Newcastle married Lady Susan Hamilton (9 June 1814 – 28 November 1889), daughter of Alexander Hamilton, 10th Duke of Hamilton, on 27 November 1832. They had five children:

- Henry Pelham-Clinton, 6th Duke of Newcastle-under-Lyne (25 January 1834 – 22 February 1879), who married Henrietta Adela Hope (11 April 1843 – 8 May 1913) on 11 February 1861 and had five children.
- Lord Edward William Pelham-Clinton (11 August 1836 – 9 July 1907), who married Matilda Jane Cradock-Hartopp (died 23 October 1892) on 22 August 1865.
- Lady Susan Charlotte Catherine Pelham-Clinton (7 April 1839 – 6 September 1875), who married Lord Adolphus Vane-Tempest (2 July 1825 – 11 June 1864) on 23 April 1860. She was a mistress of Edward VII when he was Prince of Wales.
- Lord Arthur Pelham-Clinton (23 June 1840 – 18 June 1870) who died, possibly by suicide, after being charged in the Boulton and Park case.
- Lord Albert Sidney Pelham-Clinton (22 December 1845 – 1 March 1884), who married Mrs Frances Evelyn Stotherd on 17 November 1870; they were divorced in 1877.

The marriage was unhappy and the Duke and Duchess were divorced in 1850, after a considerable scandal in which the Duchess eloped with Horatio Walpole, Lord Walpole, and had an illegitimate child by him. Newcastle died in October 1864, aged 53, and was succeeded in the dukedom by his eldest son, Henry.

His papers are now held at Manuscripts and Special Collections, The University of Nottingham.

== Coat of arms ==
Coat of arms of Henry Pelham-Clinton, 5th Duke of Newcastle
Coronet A coronet of an Duke Crest 1st, out of a ducal coronet gules, a plume of five ostrich feathers argent, banded azure; 2nd, a peacock in pride proper. Escutcheon Quarterly: 1st and 4th argent, six cross crosslets, three, two and one, sable, on a chief azure two mullets pierced gules (Clinton); 2nd and 3rd, quarterly, 1st and 4th azure, three pelicans vulning themselves argent; and 2nd and 3rd gules, two pieces of belts with buckles erect in pale, the buckles upwards argent (Pelham). Supporters Two greyhounds argent collared and lined gules. Motto Loyaulté n'a honte Loyalty knows not shame

== See also ==
- Clinton, British Columbia
- Clinton, South Australia

Parliament of the United Kingdom
New constituency	Member of Parliament for South Nottinghamshire; 1832–1846	Succeeded by Thomas Thoroton-Hildyard
Preceded by William Baird	Member of Parliament for Falkirk Burghs; 1846–1851	Succeeded by James Baird
Political offices
Preceded by Viscount Duncannon	First Commissioner of Woods and Forests; 1841–1846	Succeeded by The Viscount Canning
Preceded by Sir Thomas Fremantle, Bt	Chief Secretary for Ireland; 1846	Succeeded by Henry Labouchere
Preceded by Sir John Pakington, Bt	Secretary of State for War and the Colonies; 1852–1854	Succeeded by Himself as Secretary of State for War
Preceded by Sir John Pakington, Bt	Secretary of State for War and the Colonies; 1852–1854	Succeeded by Sir George Grey, Bt as Secretary of State for the Colonies
Preceded by Himself as Secretary of State for War and the Colonies	Secretary of State for War; 1854–1855	Succeeded by The Lord Panmure
Preceded by Sidney Herbert	Secretary at War; 1854–1855	Succeeded by The Lord Panmure
Preceded by Sir Edward Bulwer-Lytton, Bt	Secretary of State for the Colonies; 1859–1864	Succeeded by Edward Cardwell
Honorary titles
Preceded by The Earl of Scarbrough	Lord Lieutenant of Nottinghamshire; 1857–1864	Succeeded by The Lord Belper
Preceded by The Prince Consort	Lord Warden of the Stannaries; 1862–1864	Succeeded by The Lord Portman
Peerage of the United Kingdom
Preceded by Henry Pelham-Clinton	Duke of Newcastle-under-Lyne; 1851–1864	Succeeded by Henry Pelham-Clinton
