= William Hamilton, 11th Duke of Hamilton =

Scottish nobleman (1811–1863)

His Grace The Duke of Hamilton
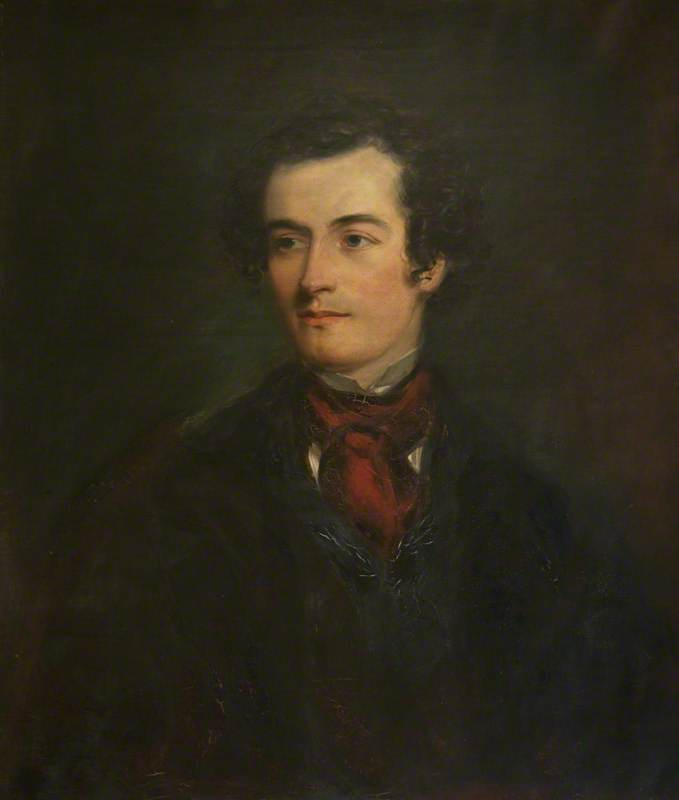

11th Duke of Hamilton 8th Duke of Brandon
- Tenure: 1852–1863
- Predecessor: Alexander Hamilton
- Successor: William Hamilton
- Born: 19 February 1811; London, England
- Died: 8 July 1863 (aged 52); Hôtel Bristol, Paris, France
- Offices: Knight Marischal, Lord Lieutenant of Lanarkshire
- Spouse: Princess Marie Amelie of Baden (m. 1843)
- Issue: William Douglas-Hamilton, 12th Duke of Hamilton; Charles Hamilton, 7th Earl of Selkirk; Lady Mary Victoria Hamilton
- Parents: Alexander Hamilton, 10th Duke of Hamilton; Susan Euphemia Beckford

William Alexander Archibald Hamilton, 11th Duke of Hamilton and 8th Duke of Brandon (19 February 1811 – 8 July 1863) styled Earl of Angus and Arran before 1819 and Marquess of Douglas and Clydesdale between 1819 and 1852, was a Scottish nobleman and the Premier Peer of Scotland.

== Biography ==
Hamilton was the son of Alexander Hamilton, 10th Duke of Hamilton and Susan Euphemia Beckford, daughter of English novelist William Beckford. He was educated at Eton and Christ Church, Oxford. He was Knight Marischal of Scotland from 1846 and Lord Lieutenant of Lanarkshire from 1852 until his death.

At the Mannheim Palace, on 23 February 1843, he married Princess Marie Amelie of Baden, daughter of the Grand Duke Charles of Baden and Stéphanie de Beauharnais, the adopted daughter of Napoleon I. After his marriage, he lived chiefly in Paris and Baden, taking very little interest in British affairs. They had three surviving children:

- Unnamed son (stillborn 7 February 1844), at Holyrood Palace
- William Douglas-Hamilton, 12th Duke of Hamilton (1845–1895), also succeeded as 8th Earl of Selkirk in 1886
- Lt. Lord Charles George Hamilton (1847–1886), 11th Hussars, succeeded by special remainder as 7th Earl of Selkirk in 1885, died unmarried
- Lady Mary Victoria Hamilton (1850–1922), married firstly Albert I, Prince of Monaco, latterly to Prince Tassilo Festetics de Tolna

Though he had married in 1843, the duke did not succeed to his title until 1852. In that year, he purchased the house located at 22 Arlington Street in St. James's, a district of the City of Westminster in central London from Henry Somerset, 7th Duke of Beaufort for £60,000 (equivalent to £7,242,000 in 2025). The duke lavished expenses on the house for approximately a decade, including installing iron firebacks with his coronet and motto. Upon his death, the house passed to his widow who sold it to Ivor Guest, 1st Baron Wimborne via auction in 1867.

== Legacy ==
He was a close friend of the French Empress Eugenie. According to Lady Helena Gleichen, they accidentally caused a scandal at the French Court when courtiers were told that Lord Hamilton would not be joining them for the hunt because of an injury and the Empress said: "Yes, I saw the bruise on his leg. It is very bad." This shocked the French court and later, the Empress had Lord Hamilton come down to show everyone that Scottish lords wore kilts, and thus, their legs were visible to everyone.

== Ancestry ==
Ancestors of William Hamilton, 11th Duke of Hamilton

16. James Hamilton, 4th Duke of Hamilton
8. James Hamilton, 5th Duke of Hamilton
17. Hon. Elizabeth Gerard
4. Archibald Hamilton, 9th Duke of Hamilton
18. Edward Spencer
9. Anne Spencer
19. Anne Baker
2. Alexander Hamilton, 10th Duke of Hamilton
20. James Stewart, 5th Earl of Galloway
10. Alexander Stewart, 6th Earl of Galloway
21. Lady Catherine Montgomerie
5. Lady Harriet Stewart
22. John Cochrane, 4th Earl of Dundonald
11. Lady Catherine Cochrane
23. Lady Anne Murray
1. William Hamilton, 11th Duke of Hamilton
24. Peter Beckford
12. William Beckford
25. Bathshua Herring
6. William Beckford
26. Hon. George Hamilton
13. Maria Hamilton
27. Bridget Coward
3. Susan Beckford
28. John Gordon, 3rd Earl of Aboyne
14. Charles Gordon, 4th Earl of Aboyne
29. Grace Lockhart
7. Lady Margaret Gordon
30. Alexander Stewart, 6th Earl of Galloway (= 10)
15. Lady Margaret Stewart
31. Lady Catherine Cochrane (= 11)

Masonic offices
Preceded by The Earl of Buchan	Grand Master of the Grand Lodge of Scotland; 1833–1835	Succeeded by Viscount Fincastle
Honorary titles
Preceded by The Earl of Erroll	Knight Marischal; 1846–1863	Vacant
Preceded by The Duke of Hamilton and Brandon	Lord Lieutenant of Lanarkshire; 1852–1863	Succeeded by The Lord Belhaven and Stenton
Peerage of Scotland
Preceded by Alexander Hamilton	Duke of Hamilton; 1852–1863	Succeeded by William Douglas-Hamilton
Peerage of Great Britain
Preceded by Alexander Hamilton	Duke of Brandon; 1852–1863	Succeeded by William Douglas-Hamilton
