= Lady Jean Fforde =

British aristocrat and Arran landowner

Lady Jean Graham DL
- Born: Lady Jean Sybil Violet Graham; 7 November 1920; Edinburgh, Scotland
- Died: 13 October 2017 (aged 96)
- Spouse: John Fforde (m. 1947; div. 1957)
- Father: James Graham, 6th Duke of Montrose
- Mother: Lady Mary Louise Hamilton

Lady Jean Sybil Violet Fforde DL (née Graham; 7 November 1920 – 13 October 2017), between 1954 and 1995 the 20th Countess of Arran, was a Scottish aristocrat and Arran landowner who worked as a codebreaker at Bletchley Park during the Second World War. She is known for her 1994 auction of the feudal Earldom of Arran and 1,000 acres of farmland to pay for central heating in her island cottage.

== Early life ==
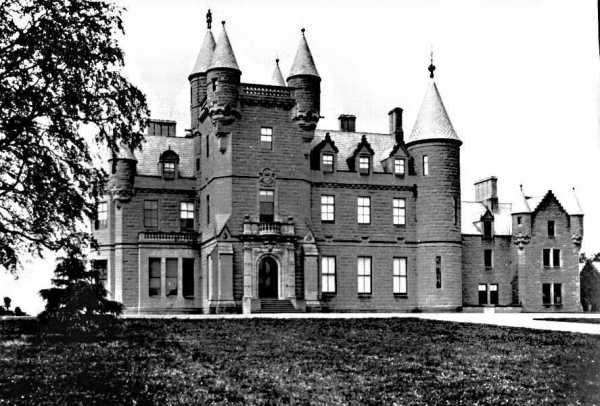
Castle Buchanan in late 1890s

Lady Jean was born at 8, Atholl Crescent, Edinburgh, the second daughter of James Graham, Marquess of Graham and his wife, Marchioness of Graham (née Lady Mary Louise Douglas-Hamilton, the only child of William Douglas-Hamilton, 12th Duke of Hamilton. She was born in Edinburgh and spent much of her childhood at Castle Buchanan on Loch Lomond. In the summer she would spend a lot of time with the royalty of Monaco, including Prince Rainier III of Monaco, husband of Grace Kelly and Princess Antoinette. She described the times they spent together as being great fun, and they spent their days playing and eating cookies.

Lady Jean Fforde enjoyed balls and parties, and she came out as a debutante in 1939 where she was presented to King George VI.

== Career ==
Her father, who was the 6th Duke of Montrose, spoke to the then Lord Louis Mountbatten (who later became the 1st Earl Mountbatten of Burma), which led to her getting a job as a "temporary assistant" at the government code and cypher school called Bletchley Park. Whilst working here she joined more than 8000 women in their mission to break German codes to help end the war.

Fforde also authored a memoir called Feet on the Ground: From Castle to Catastrophe. In this book she wrote about her personal experiences, travels and adventures. She also described her experience at Bletchley Park as a "rather dull chapter in an otherwise colourful life" and she goes on to say that "it was excessively boring. It was not as glamorous as subsequent books and films have made it appear".

Fforde worked under Alan Turing, the mathematical genius, in Hut 8 of Bletchley Park. She described her time there as "dull" and said that the few men working there were unpleasant, and the food inedible. Fforde described Turing as a “very nice man, who should have had public recognition. He was a lovely man, an accessible man. Sweet, handsome, shabby, nail-bitten, sometimes halting in speech and awkward in manner".

== Countess of Arran ==
In 1960, following the deaths of her father in 1954 and her mother in 1957, Lady Jean was forced to give up her family seat, Brodick Castle, to the National Trust for Scotland in lieu of death duties, and she relocated to an island cottage. "The castle and all its contents were taken from me and it was like losing my whole life," she said.

Lady Jean was the 20th Countess of Arran, a feudal title that had been in her family since the 15th century, and which daughters could inherit. In 1994, she auctioned off the title, 1,000 acres of land, and the remains of Lochranza Castle in order to pay for new central heating in her island cottage.

In December 1994, title and land were auctioned through the Manorial Society of Great Britain for a reputed £410,000 to millionaire businessman John de Bruyne. The sale fell through, however, and the title was purchased by Swiss businessman Willi Ernst Sturzenegger in 1995.

Five years later, feudal tenure was formally abolished by the Abolition of Feudal Tenure etc. (Scotland) Act 2000, which came into force in 2004. In 2006, Sturzenegger filed an unsuccessful petition with the Lord Lyon King of Arms to be styled as the Earl of Arran.

== Personal life ==
In 1947, Lady Jean married Colonel John Fforde, whom she later divorced in 1957. They had a son together called Charles Fforde. They spent a lot of time travelling, and they lived in Palestine, Sierra Leone and Northern Rhodesia.

== Ancestry ==
Ancestors of Lady Jean Fforde

16. James Graham, 3rd Duke of Montrose
8. James Graham, 4th Duke of Montrose
17. Lady Caroline Montagu
4. Douglas Graham, 5th Duke of Montrose
18. John Horsley-Beresford, 2nd Baron Decies
9. Hon. Caroline Agnes Horsley-Beresford
19. Charlotte Philadelphia Horsley
2. James Graham, 6th Duke of Montrose
20. Sir James Graham, 2nd Baronet, of Netherby
10. Sir Frederick Graham 3rd Baronet, of Netherby
21. Frances Callander
5. Violet Hermione Graham
22. Edward Seymour, 12th Duke of Somerset
11. Lady Jane Hermione Seymour
23. Jane Georgiana Sheridan
1. Lady Jean Fforde
24. Alexander Hamilton, 10th Duke of Hamilton
12. William Hamilton, 11th Duke of Hamilton
25. Susan Euphemia Beckford
6. William Douglas-Hamilton, 12th Duke of Hamilton
26. Charles, Grand Duke of Baden
13. Princess Marie Amelie of Baden
27. Stéphanie de Beauharnais
3. Lady Mary Douglas-Hamilton
28. George Montagu, 6th Duke of Manchester
14. William Montagu, 7th Duke of Manchester
29. Millicent Sparrow
7. Lady Mary Montagu
30. Viktor von Alten
15. Luise von Alten
31. Hermine de Schminke

Baronage of Scotland
Preceded by James Graham	Countess of Arran; 1954-1995	Succeeded by Willi Ernst Sturzenegger
