= Earl of Arran (Scotland) =

Noble titles in Scotland

Arms of Arran are the arms of the Lord of the Isles: Argent, a lymphad with the sails furled proper flagged gules

The earldom of Arran currently exists in two forms within the Scottish nobility, in reference to the Isle of Arran. One is a peerage title in the Peerage of Scotland, held as a subsidiary title by the Duke of Hamilton.

The other is a baronage title in the Baronage of Scotland attached to the Lochranza Castle, which was auctioned off in the 1990s along with the ruins of the Castle.

== Scottish creations ==
=== Peerage of Scotland ===
==== Boyd, Earl of Arran ====
The earldom in the Peerage of Scotland was created on 26 April 1467 for Thomas Boyd and his new wife, the 14-year-old Princess Mary Stewart, daughter of the late James II of Scotland. Boyd's father, Robert, Lord Boyd, was a regent for Princess Mary's younger brother, the teenaged King James III, who was kept at Edinburgh Castle under the governorship of Boyd's brother Sir Alexander Boyd. The "unscrupulous" Lord Boyd, along with his "hapless" brother, arranged the marriage to the King's elder sister without consulting the King. As part of Princess Mary's dowry, Thomas Boyd was given the Isle of Arran and its earldom, Baronies of Stewarton and Kilmarnock, and extensive lands in Ayrshire, Carrick, the Great Cumbrae, Roxburgh, Forfar, and Perthshire. Four royal charters were simultaneously created covering the grants to Thomas Boyd. They lived at Kilmarnock Castle and its newly built palace, and their joined arms, Boyd impaling the Royal Arms of Scotland, was carved into the wall.

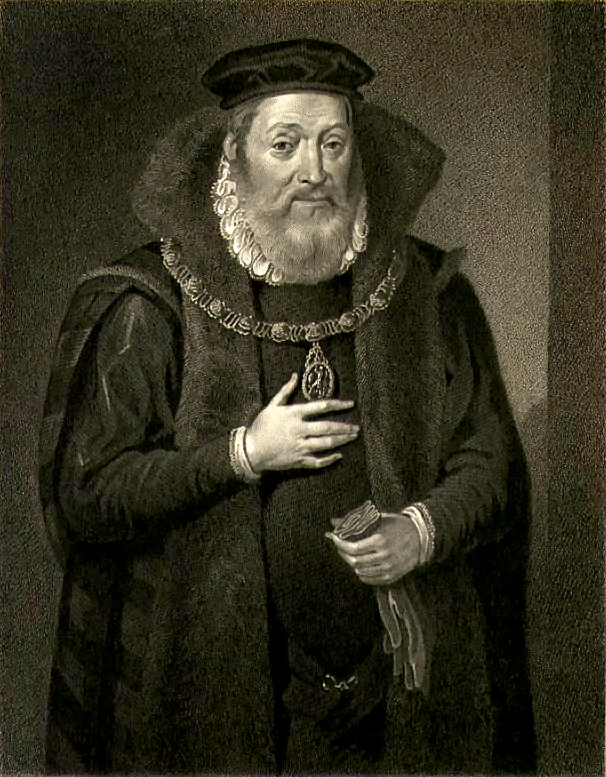
James Hamilton, 2nd Earl of Arran

However, the marriage was wildly unpopular, as the Isle of Arran was coveted royal land, and the King considered it unforgivable. Robert Boyd, Thomas Boyd, and Sir Alexander Boyd were attainted for treason in 1469 for abducting the King, and their titles and lands were forfeited. They fled to Denmark but Princess Mary, though reportedly very attached to her husband, returned to Scotland, where she presumably sought a pardon from her brother. Thomas Boyd was summoned to Scotland but failed to appear within 60 days. The marriage was formally annulled by the Pope Sixtus IV in April 1474. Robert Boyd died shortly afterward and Princess Mary was forced to marry James Hamilton, 1st Lord Hamilton.

==== Hamilton, Earls of Arran ====
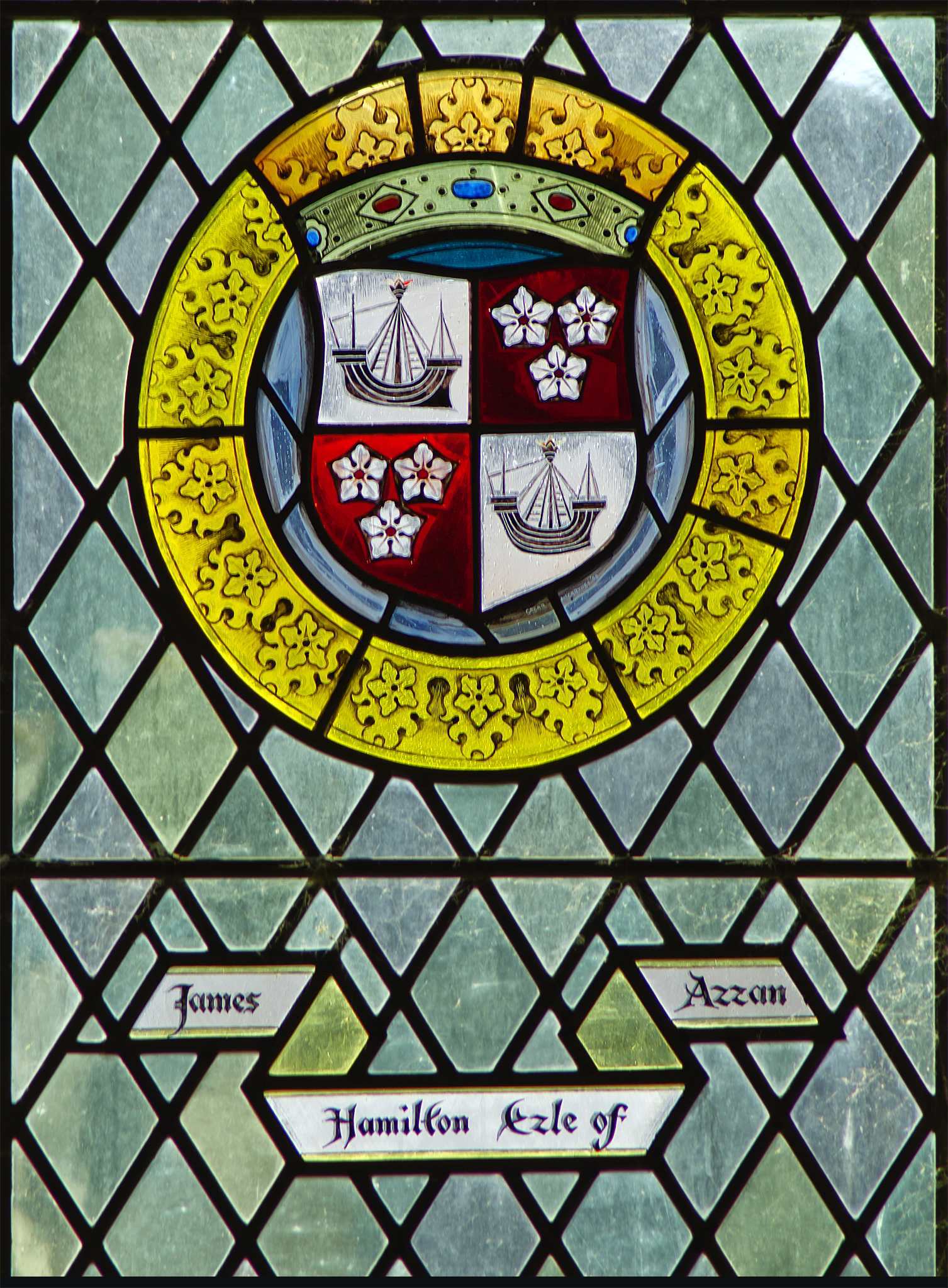
Arms of "James, Erle of Arran" at Stirling Castle

In 1482, the lands attainted from Thomas Boyd were restored to James Hamilton, 2nd Lord Hamilton, the only son of Princess Mary and the 1st Lord Hamilton. His son, James Hamilton, 2nd Earl of Arran, succeeded his father in 1529. He was Regent of Scotland between 1542 and 1554, and guardian of the young Mary, Queen of Scots. His son, James Hamilton, 3rd Earl of Arran was to inherit the title after his father's death in 1575. However, having been declared insane in 1562, his brother John Hamilton managed the estate and kept James confined to Craignethan Castle. However, in 1586 his resignation was ruled by the Court of Session to be the act of a madman and his honours were restored.

In 1609, the title passed to James Hamilton, 2nd Marquess of Hamilton, when he inherited the earldom. Then in 1643, the 3rd Marquess of Hamilton was made Duke of Hamilton and received a second grant of the earldom of Arran. This created two separate creations of the earldom of Arran within the Hamilton family.

When the 2nd Duke of Hamilton died, the 1503 creation of the earldom became dormant, as it was left unclaimed. Meanwhile, the 1643 creation of the earldom continued to descend with the Dukedom of Hamilton, and the two titles remain united to this day.

=== Feudal lordship ===
The baronage earldom of Arran supposedly originated during feudal times, with its caput at Lochranza Castle, which dates to the 13th century. However, a feudal title, like much of the early history of Arran, is not recorded. For centuries, the Isle of Arran belonged to island chiefs the Lord of the Isles until it was claimed by the King of Scotland, and eventually erected into a title of nobility in the Peerage of Scotland in the late 15th century.

In 1994, Lady Jean Fforde and granddaughter of the 12th Duke of Hamilton, transferred the feudal earldom along with the ruins of Lochranza Castle, partly to support improvements to her island cottage. She had been forced to surrender the family seat, Brodick Castle, to the National Trust of Scotland in lieu of death duties in 1960.

In December 1994, an attempt was made to transfer the title and associated land through the Manorial Society of Great Britain, though it ultimately did not succeed. The following year, the feudal lands formerly held by the Hamilton family, including Lochranza Castle, came under the ownership of Swiss national Willi Ernst Sturzenegger. Under Scots property law, the disposition of these feudal lands carried with it the associated baronial title, which thereby passed to Sturzenegger.

In 1997, Sturzenegger submitted a petition to the Lord Lyon King of Arms seeking official recognition as "Willi Ernst Sturzenegger of Arran, Earl of Arran in the territorial baronage of Scotland" along with a grant of arms reflecting this designation. His petition was based on his connection to "the Lands and Earldom of Arran in the County of Bute including inter alia the Castle of Lochranza the caput thereof." Following the Abolition of Feudal Tenure etc. (Scotland) Act 2000, which came into effect in 2004, Sturzenegger submitted a second petition to the Lyon Court in 2006. This time he sought recognition as "Willi Ernst Sturzenegger of Arran, Feudal Earl of Arran" with corresponding heraldic elements. In 2009, Lord Lyon David Sellar issued a ruling denying this second petition.

In 2015, the new Lord Lyon Joseph Morrow reversed the decision in a similar petition concerning the feudal lordship of Garioch, writing, "in Scotland anyone is at liberty to call themselves what they wish subject to it not being the intention to deceive another person."

The arms historically associated with the baronage earldom of Arran are the same as the arms of the Lord of the Isles (also used in other Scottish arms including Earl of Caithness, the Duke of Argyll, and the Duke of Rothesay): Argent, a lymphad with the sails furled proper flagged gules. These are quartered today with the arms of Hamilton (Gules, three cinquefoils ermine) by the Duke of Hamilton.

== Earls of Arran ==
=== Earls of Arran, first creation (1467) ===
- Thomas Boyd, Earl of Arran (died c. 1472) (forfeit 1469)

=== Earls of Arran, second and third creations (1503, 1643) ===
- James Hamilton, 1st Earl of Arran (c. 1475–1529)
- James Hamilton, 2nd Earl of Arran (1515–1575)
- James Hamilton, 3rd Earl of Arran (1533/1538–1609) (under attainder 1579–1585 on account of insanity, replaced temporarily by James Stewart, Earl of Arran)
- James Hamilton, 4th Earl of Arran (1589–1625) (had already succeeded as 2nd Marquess of Hamilton)

See Duke of Hamilton for further succession.

=== Holders of the feudal earldom of Arran, baronage title ===
- Lady Jean Fforde (died 2017) (dispone 1994)
- Willi Ernst Sturzenegger (1995–2023)
- Susan Clark Livingston (2023–present)

== Family tree ==
Douglas-Hamilton family trees: Dukes of: Abercorn, Brandon, and Hamilton with subsidiary and courtesy titles

James II; 1430–1460; King of Scotland
Earl of Arran (Scotland) (1st creation), 1467	Lord Hamilton, 1445
Thomas Boyd d. c. 1473; Earl of Arran	Mary Stewart; 1453–1488 dowager Countess of Arran	James Hamilton c. 1415–1479; 1st Lord Hamilton	James III; 1451–1488; King of Scotland
Earldom of Arran (1st creation) forfeit, 1469
Earl of Arran (Scotland) (2nd creation), 1503
James Hamilton c. 1475–1529; 2nd Lord Hamilton, 1st Earl of Arran	James IV; 1473–1513; King of Scotland
Catherine Stewart (illegit.) c. 1495–1554	James Douglas d. 1548; Earl of Morton
Duke of Châtellerault (France) (5th creation), 1548
James Hamilton c. 1516–1575; 2nd Earl of Arran, 3rd Lord Hamilton, 1st Duke of Châtellerault	Margaret Douglas c. 1510–1579
Dukedom of Châtellerault (5th creation) forfeit, 1559
Marquess of Hamilton, Earl of Arran, and Lord Aven, 1599	Lord Paisley, 1587
James Hamilton c. 1533–1609; 3rd Earl of Arran, 4th Lord Hamilton	Anne Hamilton c. 1535 – c. 1574 m. George Gordon Earl of Huntly	John Hamilton; 1540–1604; 1st Marquess of Hamilton, etc.	Claud Hamilton; 1546–1621; Lord Paisley
Earl of Cambridge (England) (4th creation) and Baron of Innerdale, 1619	Lord Abercorn, 1603; Earl of Abercorn, Lord of Paisley, Hamilton, Mountcastell and Kilpatrick, 1606
George Gordon; 1562–1636; Marquess of Huntly	James Hamilton; 1589–1625; 2nd Marquess of Hamilton, etc., 4th Earl of Arran, 1st Earl of Cambridge, etc. 5th Lord Hamilton, Lord Aberbrothwick/Arbroath	James Hamilton; 1575–1618; 1st Earl of Abercorn, Lord Abercorn and Lord of Paisley, Hamilton, Mountcastell and Kilpatrick
Earldom of Angus (1389 creation) resigned in favor of: Marquess of Douglas, Earl of Angus, Lord Abernethy, Lord Bonkyll and Preston, Lord Abernethy, and Lord Jedburgh Forest, 1633	Duke of Hamilton, Marquess of Clydesdale, Earl of Arran and Cambridge (Scotland) and Baron of Aven and Innerdale, 1643	Earl of Lanark, 1639	Baron Hamilton of Strabane, 1617
William Douglas; 1589–1660; 1st Marquess of Douglas, etc. 11th Earl of Angus (1389 creation)	Mary Gordon c. 1600–1674	James Hamilton; 1606–1649; 1st Duke of Hamilton, etc., 3rd Marquess of Hamilton, etc., 5th Earl of Arran, 2nd Earl of Cambridge, etc.	William Hamilton; 1616–1651; 2nd Duke of Hamilton, etc., 1st Earl of Lanark, 6th Earl of Arran, 3rd Earl of Cambridge, etc.	James Hamilton c. 1604 – c. 1670; 2nd Earl of Abercorn, etc., 2nd Lord Paisley, 1st Lord Hamilton of Strabane	Claud Hamilton c. 1606–1638; 2nd Lord Hamilton of Strabane	George Hamilton c. 1607–1679
Earldom of Cambridge (4th creation) and Barony of Innerdale extinct and Earldom of Arran (2nd creation) dormant, 1651
Earl of Selkirk and Lord Daer and Shortcleuch, 1646
see Earl of Ormond family tree for Marquesses of Douglas, Earls of Angus, etc.	William Douglas-Hamilton; 1634–1694 jure uxoris Duke of Hamilton, etc. suo jure, 1st Earl of Selkirk, etc.	Anne Hamilton; 1631–1716 suo jure 3rd Duchess of Hamilton, etc., 2nd Countess of Lanark	George Hamilton c. 1636 – c. 1680; 3rd Earl of Abercorn, etc.	James Hamilton c. 1633 – c. 1670; Lord Paisley	James Hamilton; 1633–1655; 3rd Lord Hamilton of Strabane	George Hamilton c. 1636–1668; 4th Lord Hamilton of Strabane	James Hamilton c. 1620–1673
Ceded Dukedom of Hamilton to 4th Duke, 1698
Duke of Brandon and Baron Dutton, 1711	Earl of Ruglen, 1697	Earl of Orkney (3rd creation), 1697	Viscount Strabane and Baron Mountcastle, 1701
James Hamilton; 1658–1712; 4th Duke of Hamilton, etc., 1st Duke of Brandon, etc. 3rd Earl of Lanark, etc.	Charles Douglas; 1663–1739; 2nd Earl of Selkirk, etc.	John Douglas-Hamilton; 1664–1744; 3rd Earl of Selkirk, etc., 1st Earl of Ruglen	George Hamilton; 1666–1737; 1st Earl of Orkney	Basil Hamilton; 1671–1701	Catherine Hamilton	Charles Hamilton d. 1701; 5th Earl of Abercorn, etc., 6th Lord Hamilton of Strabane	Claud Hamilton; 1658–1691; 4th Earl of Abercorn, etc., 5th Lord Hamilton of Strabane	James Hamilton c. 1661–1734; 6th Earl of Abercorn, etc., 7th Lord Hamilton of Strabane
see Earls of Ruglen	see Earls of Orkney	Basil Hamilton; 1696–1742	James Hamilton; 1685–1744; 7th Earl of Abercorn, etc., 8th Lord Hamilton of Strabane
Viscount Hamilton, 1786
James Hamilton; 1703–1743; 5th Duke of Hamilton, etc., 2nd Duke of Brandon, etc. 4th Earl of Lanark, etc.	Lord Anne Hamilton; 1709–1748	Dunbar Douglas; 1722–1799; 4th Earl of Selkirk, etc.	James Hamilton; 1712–1789; 8th Earl of Abercorn, etc., 9th Lord Hamilton of Strabane, 1st Viscount Hamilton	John Hamilton; 1714–1755
Baron Hamilton of Hameldon county, Leicester, 1776	Marquess of Abercorn, 1790
James Hamilton; 1724–1758; 6th Duke of Hamilton, etc., 3rd Duke of Brandon, etc., 5th Earl of Lanark, etc.	Elizabeth Gunning (c. 1733–1790) suo jure 1st Baroness Hamilton	Archibald Hamilton; 1740–1819; 9th Duke of Hamilton, etc., 6th Duke of Brandon, 8th Earl of Lanark, etc.	Charles Powell Hamilton; 1747–1825	John Hamilton; 1756–1818; 1st Marquess of Abercorn, 9th Earl of Abercorn, etc., 10th Lord Hamilton of Strabane
James Hamilton; 1755–1769; 7th Duke of Hamilton, etc., 4th Duke of Brandon and Baron Dutton, Marquess of Angus and Abernethy, 4th Marquess of Douglas, etc., 6th Earl of Lanark, etc.	Douglas Hamilton; 1756–1799; 8th Duke of Hamilton, etc., 5th Duke of Brandon, Marquess of Douglas, etc.<>br/>7th Earl of Lanark, etc., 2nd Baron Hamilton	Alexander Hamilton; 1767–1852; 10th Duke of Hamilton, etc., 7th Duke of Brandon, Marquess of Douglas, and Baron Dutton, Earl of Angus, and Lord Abernethy and Jedburgh Forest, 9th Earl of Lanark, etc.	Augustus Barrington Price Anne Powell Douglas-Hamilton; 1781–1849	Thomas Douglas; 1771–1820; 5th Earl of Selkirk, etc.	James Hamilton; 1786–1818 styled Viscount Hamilton
Duke of Abercorn, of Strabane and Duke of Abercorn, 1868
William Alexander Anthony Archibald Hamilton; 1811–1863; 11th Duke of Hamilton, etc., 8th Duke of Brandon, Marquess of Douglas, Earl of Angus, Lord Abernethy and Jedburgh Forest, and Baron Dutton, 10th Earl of Lanark, etc.	Charles Douglas-Hamilton; 1808–1873	Dunbar James Douglas; 1809–1885; 6th Earl of Selkirk, etc.	James Hamilton; 1811–1885; 1st Duke of Abercorn, 2nd Marquess of Abercorn, 10th Earl of Abercorn, etc., 2nd Viscount Hamilton, 11th Lord Hamilton of Strabane
Duke of Châtellerault (France) (5th creation), revived 1548
William Alexander Louis Stephen Douglas-Hamilton; 1845–1895; 12th Duke of Hamilton, etc., 9th Duke of Brandon, Marquess of Douglas, Earl of Angus, Lord Abernethy and Jedburgh Forest and Baron Dutton, 2nd Duke of Châtellerault, 8th Earl of Selkirk, etc., 11th Earl of Lanark, etc.	Charles George Douglas-Hamilton; 1847–1886; 7th Earl of Selkirk, etc.	James Hamilton; 1838–1913; 2nd Duke of Abercorn, 3rd Marquess of Abercorn, 11th Earl of Abercorn, etc., 12th Lord Hamilton of Strabane
Alfred Douglas Douglas-Hamilton; 1862–1940; 13th Duke of Hamilton, etc., 10th Duke of Brandon, Marquess of Douglas, Earl of Angus (1633 creation), Lord Abernethy and Jedburgh Forest, and Baron Dutton, 20th Earl of Angus (1389 creation), 9th Earl of Selkirk, etc., 12th Earl of Lanark, etc.	James Albert Edward Hamilton; 1869–1953; 3rd Duke of Abercorn, 4th Marquess of Abercorn, 12th Earl of Abercorn, etc., 13th Lord Hamilton of Strabane
Douglas Douglas-Hamilton; 1903–1973; 14th Duke of Hamilton, etc., 11th Duke of Brandon, Marquess of Douglas, Earl of Angus (1633 creation), Lord Abernethy and Jedburgh Forest, and Baron Dutton, 21st Earl of Angus (1389 creation), 13rd Earl of Lanark, etc.	George Nigel Douglas-Hamilton; 1906–1994; 10th Earl of Selkirk, etc., 10th Lord Daer and Shortcleuch	Malcolm Douglas-Hamilton; 1909–1964	James Edward Hamilton; 1904–1979; 4th Duke of Abercorn, 5th Marquess of Abercorn, 13th Earl of Abercorn, etc., 14th Lord Hamilton of Strabane
Baron Selkirk of Douglas, 1997
Angus Alan Douglas Douglas-Hamilton; 1938–2010; 15th Duke of Hamilton, etc., 12th Duke of Brandon, Marquess of Douglas, Earl of Angus (1633 creation), Lord Abernethy and Jedburgh Forest, and Baron Dutton, 22nd Earl of Angus (1389 creation), 14th Earl of Lanark, etc.	James Alexander Douglas-Hamilton; 1942–2023; 11th Earl of Selkirk, etc., Earldom disclaimed, 1994, Baron Selkirk of Douglas	Alasdair Douglas-Hamilton b. 1939	James Hamilton b. 1934; 5th Duke of Abercorn, 6th Marquess of Abercorn, 14th Earl of Abercorn, etc., 15th Lord Hamilton of Strabane
Barony Selkirk of Douglas expired as a life peerage, 2023
Alexander Douglas-Hamilton b. 1978; 16th Duke of Hamilton, etc., 13th Duke of Brandon, Marquess of Douglas, Earl of Angus (1633 creation), Lord Abernethy and Jedburgh Forest, and Baron Dutton, 23rd Earl of Angus (1389 creation), 15th Earl of Lanark and Lord Machanshyre and Polmont	John William Douglas-Hamilton b. 1979	John Andrew Douglas-Hamilton b. 1978; 12th Earl of Selkirk, etc.	Charles Douglas Douglas-Hamilton (b. 1979)	Angus Gavin Douglas-Hamilton b. 1968	James Hamilton b. 1969 styled Marquess of Hamilton
Heir presumptive to the Earldom of Selkirk
Douglas Douglas-Hamilton b. 2012 styled Marquess of Douglas and Clydesdale	William Frederick Douglas-Hamilton b. 2014	Basil George Douglas-Hamilton b. 2016	William Douglas-Hamilton b. 1999	James Hamilton b. 2005 styled Viscount Strabane
Heir apparent to the dukedoms of Hamilton and Brandon
