= Mary Louise Hamilton, Duchess of Montrose =

British noble (1884–1957)

Her Grace The Duchess of Montrose OBE
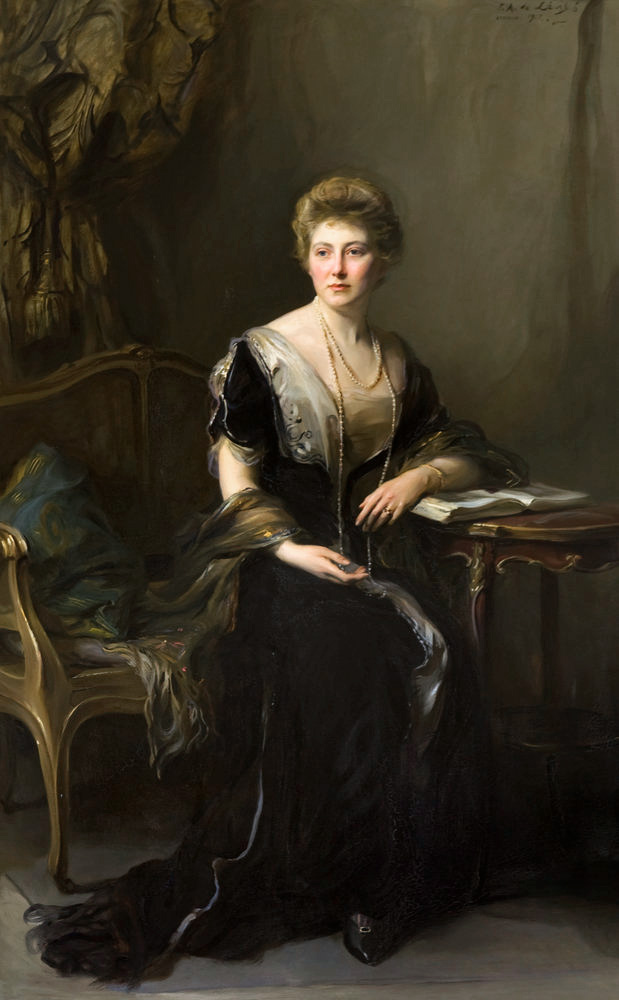
- 1912 portrait

Duchess of Montrose
- Tenure: 10 December 1925 – 20 January 1954 (28 years, 41 days)
- Predecessor: Violet Hermione Graham
- Successor: Susan Semple
- Other titles: Marchioness of Montrose; Marchioness of Graham and Buchanan; Countess of Montrose; Countess of Kincardine; Countess Graham; Viscountess of Dundaff; Baroness Graham of Belford; Lady Graham; Lady Graham and Mugdock; Lady Aberruthven, Mugdock and Fintrie
- Born: 1 November 1884; London, United Kingdom
- Died: 21 February 1957 (aged 72); Brodick Castle
- Spouse: James Graham, 6th Duke of Montrose (m. 1906)
- Issue: Angus Graham, 7th Duke of Montrose; Lady Mary Graham; Lord Ronald Graham; Lady Jean Graham
- Father: William Douglas-Hamilton, 12th Duke of Hamilton
- Mother: Lady Mary Louise Montagu

Mary Louise Hamilton, Duchess of Montrose (1 November 1884 – 21 February 1957) was a Scottish noblewoman, the only daughter of William Douglas-Hamilton, 12th Duke of Hamilton and Lady Mary Louise Montagu. By marriage to James Graham, 6th Duke of Montrose, she was Duchess of Montrose.

== Family ==
Lady Mary Louise Hamilton was born on 1 November 1884 in London, the only daughter of William Douglas-Hamilton, 12th Duke of Hamilton and Lady Mary Louise Montagu. Both of her parents were of German descent on one side through their mother: William Douglas-Hamilton's mother was Princess Marie Amelie of Baden and Lady Mary Louise Montagu's mother was Countess Luise von Alten of Kingdom of Hanover.

Through her father, Lady Mary Louise Hamilton had relations with many European royal families. Her first cousins once removed included Carol I of Romania, Stephanie of Hohenzollern-Sigmaringen, Queen of Portugal (Carol I and Stephanie were children of Princess Josephine of Baden) and Carola of Vasa, Queen of Saxony (daughter of Princess Louise Amelie of Baden). Moreover, Lady Mary was great-great-granddaughter of Napoléon Bonaparte, (Note: Stéphanie de Beauharnais, Lady Mary's great grandmother, was Napoléon Bonaparte's adoptive daughter.) Last but not least, Lady Mary's aunt, Lady Mary Victoria was firstly married to Albert I, Prince of Monaco and had a son with him, so Lady Mary Louise was first cousin of Louis II, Prince of Monaco.

== Early life ==
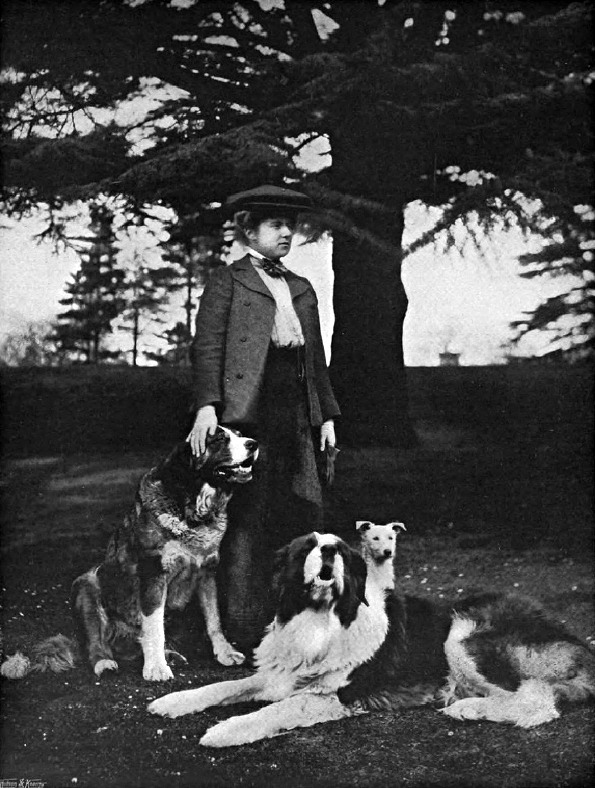
Lady Mary Louise Hamilton, portrait by Alexander Bassano, 1906.

Her father, William Douglas-Hamilton, 12th Duke of Hamilton was an absent father when she was young. However, it was known that the Duke once gave his daughter, Lady Mary Louise a copy of Alice's Adventures in Wonderland which had the signature of the duke as a Christmas gift in 1890. On 16 May 1895, when Lady Mary was 10 years old, her father died. Although the title Duke of Hamilton was once held by the 1st Duke's daughter, Lady Anne Hamilton, she could not succeeded her father's titles by the third remainder; as a result her father's titles, as well as much of the Hamilton property and assets, which included £1 million in debts, went to the late Duke's fourth cousin, Alfred Douglas-Hamilton.

Lady Mary Louise lived a quite, nearly isolated life with her mother, The Dowager Duchess of Hamilton. The Dowager Duchess was an over-protective mother to Lady Mary. Even when Lady Mary was taking dancing lessons, the Dowager Duchess refused to allow other children to attend the classes so chairs were used to represent the other couples. Just like her mother, Lady Mary was a skillful horsewoman and hunter, as she could hunt five to six days a week and was a good shot with both rifle and gun. She later became a knowledgeable gardener.

According to The Sketch, Lady Mary Louise was called "Queen of Arran"; her beauty and charming disposition made her the idol of the people if Arran. On the day she came of age, the island blazed with bonfires through the night and thousands of guests danced until dawn at Brodick Castle.

== Inheritance ==
Lady Mary’s father the 12th Duke of Hamilton died in 1895. The late Duke’s estates were valued at £1,902,559 for probate, although these were encumbered with £965,999 in debts. The bulk of his Scottish estate was left to the next-in-line to the Dukedom, Lady Mary’s fourth-cousin-once-removed Alfred Douglas-Hamilton, 13th Duke of Hamilton; however, under the terms of her father’s will Lady Mary inherited:

- The 4,900-acre Easton Park estate in Suffolk and 102,000-acre Isle of Arran estates (centred on Brodick Castle) in Scotland; the combined valuation of these estates was deemed to be £374,713 for probate purposes in 1895;
- A £100,000 Trust Fund; and,
- An additional annuity for life of £7,000.

Consequently, Lady Mary became a wealthy heiress; during her early adulthood she reportedly enjoyed an annual income of over £30,000.

Lady Mary's inheritance was subject to some £36,000 in death and settlement duties, which she was eventually required to pay after her father's successor Alfred Douglas-Hamilton, 13th Duke of Hamilton instigated legal proceedings against Mary and her father's executors in 1916, during which he claimed that he did not bear responsibility for the payment of death duties on property inherited by Lady Mary.

== Marriage and children ==
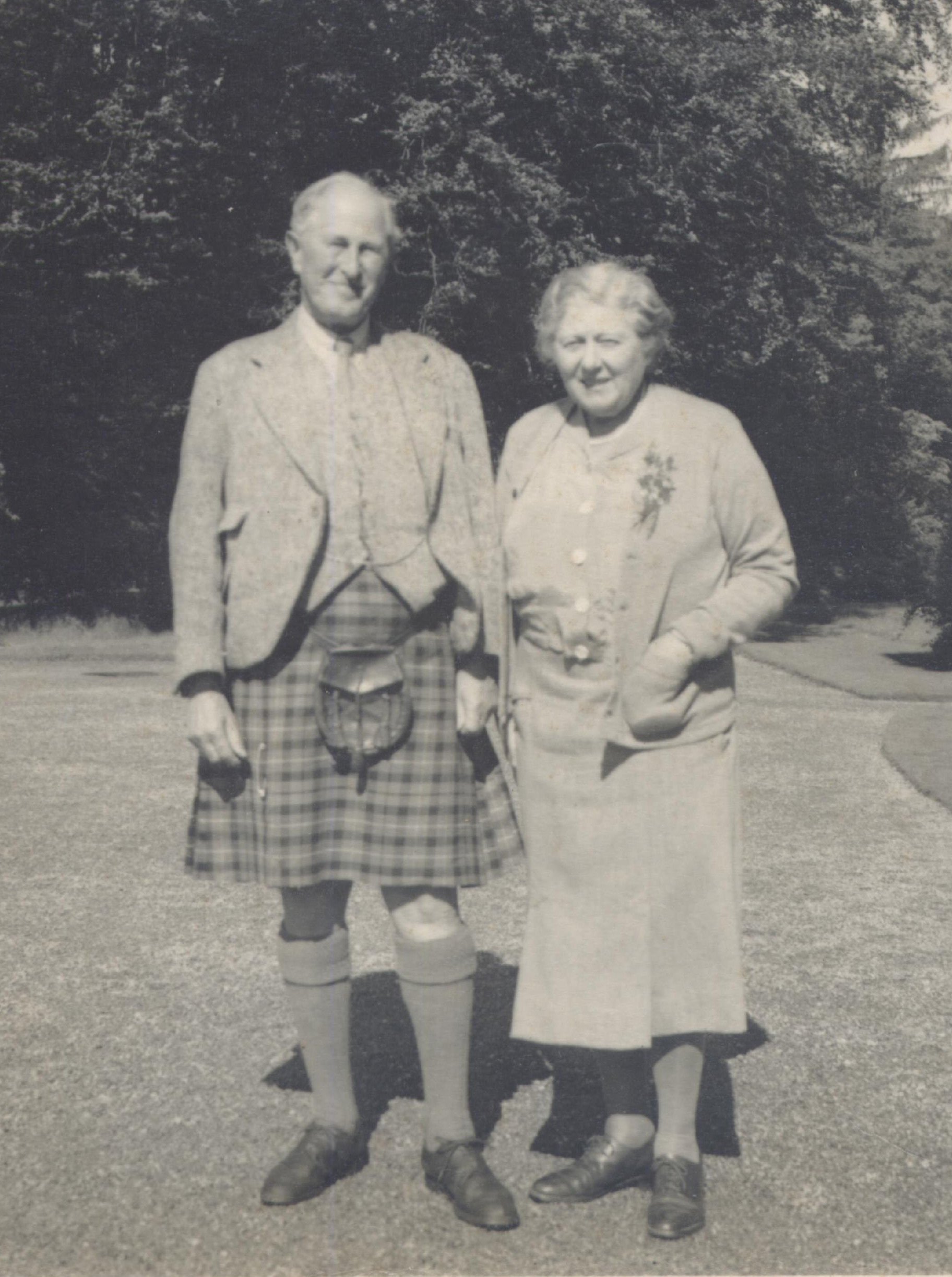
The 6th Duke and Duchess of Montrose, 1945

On 14 June 1906, at St George's, Hanover Square, London, Lady Mary Louise married James Graham, Marquess of Graham. King Edward VII also attended the wedding, as well as various members of the aristocracy. The couple had four children:

- James Angus Graham, 7th Duke of Montrose (2 May 1907 – 10 February 1992); married firstly to Isabel Veronia Sellar on 20 October 1930 and had issue, then divorced in 1950; remarried to Susan Mary Joclyn Semple on 17 April 1952 and had issue.
- Lady Mary Helen Alma Graham (11 April 1909 – 7 February 1999); married firstly to Major John Perceval Townshend Boscawen on 21 April 1931 and had issue; married secondly to Brig Leslie Colville Dunn (d.1990) on 15 December 1975 and had no issue.
- Lord Ronald Malise Hamilton Graham (20 September 1912 – 11 June 1978); married to Nancy Edith Baker on 16 September 1938 and have no issue.
- Lady Jean Sibyl Violet Graham (7 November 1920 – 13 October 2017); married to Colonel John Patrick Ilbert Fforde CBE (b. 1910; d. 1993) on 8 Oct 1947 and had issue. She divorced him in 1957.

The family lived at Buchanan Castle, Stirlingshire, at Brodick Castle, Arran, and at Easton Park, Suffolk. Although having little in common, the couple had a very happy marriage life.

== World War I ==
During World War I, while Marquess of Graham founded the Royal Naval Volunteer Reserve, Marchioness of Gramham gave unstinting service in nursing. Easton Park, Marchioness of Graham's estate in Suffolk, was turned into a Red Cross Hospital with the Dowager Duchess of Hamilton acted as the Commander and Marchioness of Graham, trained to be a nurse, as Voluntary Aid Detachment. At the end of the First World War, she was a Theatre Sister in Bellahouston Hospital Later she came back to Brodick Castle and created a convalescent hospital in The White House in Lamlash. As a result, she had the chance to reunited with her children althourhg her work took her from them most of the time. She rode from the castle to Lamlash, winter and summer, on the pillion of a motor cycle, which was unusual to say the least, for a woman of that time.

== Duchess of Montrose ==
On 10 December 1925, her father-in-law Douglas Graham, 5th Duke of Montrose died, and she and her husband succeeded as Duke and Duchess of Montrose. In 1932 the couple and their family vacated the ancestral seat of the Dukes of Montrose, Buchanan Castle, due to the heavy financial burden of death duties arising from the death of the 5th Duke. Some of the fixtures and fittings from Buchanan Castle were also removed and later installed at Brodick Castle, including the elaborate oak fire surround in the exhibition room and the magnificent chandelier in the Drawing Room.

== Personal life ==
They ensured fair wages for their work people, and at the time of the Great Depression the Duke reduced the rents on his estates to their pre-war level to alleviate hardship. In time, their estates declined, but they remained 'beloved chieftains' until their passing. They were also essentially homely people. The duchess was an artist, sculptor and musician: she had won a prize for drawing at the Loughborough School of Art, had cast three pieces in bronze and could play piano and violin well. She was a knowledgeable farmer, having had one of the first farms in Arran to be tested and cleared of Tuberculosis. She was also an enthusiastic dog breeder, and at one time there were seventy dogs in the Brodick kennels. She was a keen gardener, and it was she who was responsible for creating at Brodick one of the finest rhododendron gardens in Europe.

== Appearance and personalities ==
Mary Louise was an old-fashioned woman: She thought of debutantes as girls wearing pale colour dresses with flower ornaments in their hair; she was against make up, colour nail vanish, and cigarettes. Not only a woman of duty and discipline, she was also kind, gentle and humorous and shy. Lady Jean, her daughter believed that her shyness, thanks to her mother was the reason that some of her quotes, which meant to be a joke, ended up being caustic remarks and often struck near the bone.

== Brodick Castle ==
The Duchess of Montrose was noted for her impact on the present gardens of Brodick Castle, which she inherited. She was reportedly fascinated with, and subscribed to, the plant-hunting expeditions of the 1920s undertaken by George Forrest, Joseph Rock and Frank Kingdon-Ward. Together with her son-in-law, Major J.P.T. Boscawen, and a team of gardeners, the duchess created woodland garden with plants from Chile, Burma, the Himalayas and Tasmania.

From her marriage till her own death, Mary Louise had made Brodick Castle become her private family home. The part of the house most closely associated with the Duchess is the suite of three rooms that leads off the landing at the head of the staircase: the dressing-room and bedroom on the west front, the boudoir overlooking the garden, and its associated boudoir landing. These rooms reflect an interesting blend of personal memories and choice items from the Beckford Collection paintings, porcelain and furniture. This was typical of the family life of the Montroses: their four children grew up surrounded by priceless treasures.

== Death ==
on 21 February 1957, Mary Louise died at Brodick Castle. Only her two daughters, Lady Mary and Jean and family of Lady Mary were present. Her son Angus was in hospital for an upcoming operation so he and his family could not show up and her other son Donald was in Jamaica. When her husband died of heart failure on 20 January 1954 at Buchanan Castle, Mary Louise realised that Brodick Castle and its estate could have no future as a family home because death duties would cripple it irredeemably. So after her own death, which happened on 21 February 1957, the castle, its garden and a considerable portion of her collection were accepted by the Treasury in lieu of death duties and transferred to the National Trust for Scotland in 1958.

== Orders ==
Mary Louise was awarded the title Officer of the Order of the British Empire in 1918.

== Ancestry ==
Ancestors of Mary Louise Hamilton, Duchess of Montrose

16. Archibald Hamilton, 9th Duke of Hamilton
8. Alexander Hamilton, 10th Duke of Hamilton
17. Lady Harriet Stewart
4. William Hamilton, 11th Duke of Hamilton
18. William Beckford
9. Susan Euphemia Beckford
19. Lady Margaret Gordon
2. William Douglas-Hamilton, 12th Duke of Hamilton
20. Hereditary Prince Karl Ludwig of Baden
10. Charles, Grand Duke of Baden
21. Princess Amalie of Hesse-Darmstadt
5. Princess Marie Amelie of Baden
22. Claude de Beauharnais, 2nd Count des Roches-Baritaud
11. Stéphanie de Beauharnais
23. Claudine Françoise Adrienne Gabrielle de Lézay-Marnézia
1. Lady Mary Louise Hamilton
24. William Montagu, 5th Duke of Manchester
12. George Montagu, 6th Duke of Manchester
25. Lady Susan Gordon
6. William Montagu, 7th Duke of Manchester
26. Robert Bernard Sparrow
13. Millicent Bernard-Sparrow
27. Lady Olivia Acheson
3. Lady Mary Louise Montagu
28. Count Viktor von Alten
14. Count Viktor von Alten
29. Baroness Charlotte von Kinsky und Tettau
7. Countess Luise von Alten
30. Friedrich Christoph von Schminke
15. Hermine von Schminke
31. Anna Helene Nebelthau

== Bibliography ==
- Beattie, Sarah (24 June 2021). "Mary, Duchess of Montrose (1884–1957), née Douglas-Hamilton". National Trust for Scotland.
- Sarah Beattie (5 May 2021). "William Douglas-Hamilton (1845–95), 12th Duke of Hamilton". National Trust for Scotland.
- Graham, Jean (1982). Castles in the Air: the Memories of a Childhood in Two Castles. Brodick, Isle of Arran, Scotland: Kilbrannan Pub. ISBN 978-0-907939-01-6.
- The Sketch (1906). The Sketch: A Journal of Art and Actuality. Ingram brothers.
- Magnússon, Magnús (1981). Scotland's castles and great houses. New York : Harmony Books. ISBN 978-0-517-54510-2.
- Lady Jean Graham (2001). Feet on the Ground: From Castles to Catastrophe. Stuart Titles Ltd.
- Cokayne, George Edward (1892). The Complete Peerage (Edition 1, Volume 4).
- Cokayne, George Edward (1893). The Complete Peerage (Edition 1, Volume 5).
- Bennett, Jackie (2018-09-04). Island Gardens: Havens of Beauty Around the British Isles. Frances Lincoln. ISBN 978-0-7112-4021-6.
- Ruvigny, Melville Amadeus Henry Douglas Heddle de La Caillemotte de Massue de Ruvigny Ruvigny and Raineval, 9th Marquis de (1914). The Titled Nobility of Europe: An International Peerage, Or "Who's Who", of the Sovereigns, Princes and Nobles of Europe. Harrison & Sons.
- Fry, Michael (23 September 2004). "Graham, James, sixth duke of Montrose". Oxford Dictionary of National Biography (online ed.). Oxford University Press. doi:10.1093/ref:odnb/72367. (Subscription, Wikipedia Library access or UK public library membership required.)
- Davis, Edward Hilary (2022-09-15). The British Bonapartes: Napoleon's Family in Britain. Pen and Sword History. ISBN 978-1-3990-8855-8.

Peerage of Scotland
Preceded by Violet Hermione Graham	Duchess of Montrose; 10 December 1925 – 20 January 1954	Succeeded by Susan Semple
Peerage of Great Britain
Preceded by Violet Hermione Graham	Countess Graham and Baroness Graham of Belford; 10 December 1925 – 20 January 1954	Succeeded by Susan Semple
