= Duchess of Hamilton =

The duchess of Hamilton is usually the spouse of the duke of Hamilton, but in one case is a duchess of Hamilton in her own right (suo jure). Duke of Hamilton is an extant title in the Peerage of Scotland which was created in 1643.

== Duchesses of Hamilton ==
- Mary Feilding, wife of James Hamilton, 1st Duke of Hamilton
- Lady Elizabeth Maxwell, wife of William Hamilton, 2nd Duke of Hamilton
- Anne Hamilton, 3rd Duchess of Hamilton, who held the title in her own right (suo jure)
- Elizabeth Gerard, 2nd wife of James Hamilton, 4th Duke of Hamilton
- Anne Hamilton, Duchess of Hamilton (Lady Anne Cochrane), 1st wife of James Hamilton, 5th Duke of Hamilton
- Elizabeth Hamilton, Duchess of Hamilton (Elizabeth Strangways), 2nd wife of James Hamilton, 5th Duke of Hamilton
- Anne Hamilton, Duchess of Hamilton (Anne Spencer), 3rd wife of James Hamilton, 5th Duke of Hamilton
- Elizabeth Campbell, 1st Baroness Hamilton of Hameldon (Elizabeth Gunning; 1733–1790), wife of James Hamilton, 6th Duke of Hamilton. Afterwards Duchess of Argyll and Baroness Hamilton of Hameldon.
- Elizabeth Hamilton, Duchess of Hamilton ( née Elizabeth Anne Burrell; 1757–1837), wife of Douglas Hamilton, 8th Duke of Hamilton
- Harriet Hamilton, Duchess of Hamilton (Lady Harriet Stewart), wife of Archibald Hamilton, 9th Duke of Hamilton
- Susan Hamilton, Duchess of Hamilton (Susan Euphemia Beckford), wife of Alexander Hamilton, 10th Duke of Hamilton
- Princess Marie Amelie of Baden, wife of William Hamilton, 11th Duke of Hamilton
- Lady Mary Louise Montagu, wife of William Douglas-Hamilton, 12th Duke of Hamilton
- Nina Douglas-Hamilton, Duchess of Hamilton and Brandon, wife of Alfred Douglas-Hamilton, 13th Duke of Hamilton
- Elizabeth Douglas-Hamilton, Duchess of Hamilton and Brandon (Lady Elizabeth Ivy Percy; 1916–2008), wife of Douglas Douglas-Hamilton, 14th Duke of Hamilton
- Sarah Jane Scott, 1st wife of Angus Douglas-Hamilton, 15th Duke of Hamilton
- Jillian Robertson (died 2018), 2nd wife of Angus Douglas-Hamilton, 15th Duke of Hamilton
- Kay Carmichael, 3rd wife of Angus Douglas-Hamilton, 15th Duke of Hamilton
- Sophie Rutherford, wife of Alexander Douglas-Hamilton, 16th Duke of Hamilton
