= Duchess of Montrose (disambiguation) =

Duchess of Montrose is a title in the peerage of Scotland.

Duchess of Montrose may also refer to:

- PS Duchess of Montrose, a paddle steamer, launched 1902
- TS Duchess of Montrose, a Clyde passenger steamer, launched 1930
