= Charles Hamilton, 7th Earl of Selkirk =

The Right Honourable Earl of Selkirk
- Coat of Arms of Earl of Selkirk

Earl of Selkirk
- Tenure: 11 April 1885 – 2 May 1886 (1 year, 21 days)
- Predecessor: Dunbar Douglas
- Successor: William Hamilton
- Other titles: Lord Daer and Shortcleuch
- Born: Lord Charles George Archibald Hamilton; 18 May 1847
- Died: 2 May 1886 (aged 38)
- Noble family: Hamilton
- Father: William Hamilton, 11th Duke of Hamilton
- Mother: Princess Marie Amelie of Baden

Charles Hamilton, 7th Earl of Selkirk (18 May 1847 – 2 May 1886), was a Scottish nobleman and officer. Charles Hamilton was the youngest son of William Hamilton, 11th Duke of Hamilton and Princess Marie Amelie of Baden.

== Family ==
Charles George Archibald Hamilton was born on 18 May 1847, the third son of William Hamilton, 11th Duke of Hamilton and Princess Marie Amelie of Baden. As a younger son of a duke, he was styled as Lord Charles Hamilton. Save for the eldest son who was stillborn, his elder brother was William Douglas-Hamilton, 12th Duke of Hamilton and a younger sister was Lady Mary Douglas-Hamilton, mother of Louis II, Prince of Monaco.

Through his mother, Charles had relations to many European royal houses: his cousin were Carol I of Romania, Stephanie of Hohenzollern-Sigmaringen, Queen of Portugal (Carol I and Stephanie were children of Princess Josephine of Baden) and Carola of Vasa, Queen of Saxony (daughter of Princess Louise Amelie of Baden). Moreover, Charles was great-grandson of Napoléon Bonaparte, (Note: Charles Hamilton's maternal grandmother was Napoléon Bonaparte's adoptive daughter.) a distant cousin of Emperor Napoléon III of France and was seen as an extended member of French Imperial family.

== Career ==
In December 1862, Charles became a Cornet in Lanarkshire Regiment of Yeomanry Cavalry. In March 1866, Charles purchased the rank Cornet of 11th Hussar in Royal Regiment of Artillery. In October 1869, he retired from the military.

== Personal life ==
Charles was known for his financial difficulties, which led to his legal troubles. In October 1869, Charles was arrested after his unsuccessful attempt to escape his creditors in a Hansom cab. In 1871, bankruptcy proceedings against Charles Hamilton were initiated and dismissed in 1874.

== Earl of Selkirk ==
On 11 April 1885, a distant cousin of Lord Charles Hamilton, Dunbar Douglas, 6th Earl of Selkirk died with no issue. Although his elder brother, William Douglas-Hamilton, 12th Duke of Hamilton was the closest and most senior male relative, but Lord Charles inherited the title Earl of Selkirk by special remainder of the titles.

== Death ==
On 2 May 1886, The Earl of Selkirk died at 38 years old. Because he had no male heirs so his titles were inherited by his elder brother William Douglas-Hamilton, 12th Duke of Hamilton.

== Ancestry ==
Ancestors of Charles Hamilton, 7th Earl of Selkirk

16. Charles Frederick, Grand Duke of Baden
8. Heredetary Prince Karl Friedrich of Baden
17. Princess Caroline Louise of Hesse-Darmstadt
4. Charles, Grand Duke of Baden
18. Louis IX, Landgrave of Hesse-Darmstadt
9. Princess Amalie of Hesse-Darmstadt
19. Countess Palatine Caroline of Zweibrücken
2. Princess Marie Amelie of Baden
20. Claude de Beauharnais, 1st Count des Roches-Baritaud
10. Claude de Beauharnais, 2nd Count des Roches-Baritaud
21. Marie-Anne-Françoise Mouchard de Chaban
5. Stéphanie de Beauharnais
22. Claude-François de Lezay-Marnésia
11. Claudine Françoise de Lézay-Marnézia
23. Marie-Claudine de Nettancourt, Dame de Vaubécourt
1. Charles Hamilton, 7th Earl of Selkirk
24. James Hamilton, 5th Duke of Hamilton
12. Archibald Hamilton, 9th Duke of Hamilton
25. Anne Spencer
6. Alexander Hamilton, 10th Duke of Hamilton
26. Alexander Stewart, 6th Earl of Galloway
13. Lady Harriet Stewart
27. Lady Catherine Cochrane
3. William Hamilton, 11th Duke of Hamilton
28. William Beckford
14. William Thomas Beckford
29. Maria Marsh
7. Susan Euphemia Beckford
30. Charles Gordon, 4th Earl of Aboyne
15. Lady Margaret Gordon
31. Lady Margaret Stewart

== Bibliography ==
- Davis, Edward Hilary (2022-09-15). The British Bonapartes: Napoleon's Family in Britain. Pen and Sword History. ISBN 978-1-3990-8855-8.
- Lodge, Edmund (1861). Lodge's Peerage and Baronetage (knightage & Companionage) of the British Empire. Hurst & Blackett.
- Cokayne, George Edward (1896). The Complete Peerage (Edition 1, Volume 7).
- Morris, Susan (2020-04-20). Debrett's Peerage and Baronetage 2019. eBook Partnership. p. 2875. ISBN 978-1-9997670-5-1.

Peerage of Scotland
Preceded by Dunbar Douglas	Earl of Selkirk; 1886–1895	Succeeded by William Hamilton
