= Home Farm, Brodick =

Coordinates: 55°35′18″N 5°09′29″W

Home Farm was the estate farm for Brodick Castle. It now houses a series of tourist enterprises including a cheese shop and Arran Aromatics.
