= HMS Montrose =

HMS Montrose has been the name of two ships of the United Kingdom's Royal Navy:

- HMS Montrose (D01), a Scott-class (or Admiralty-type) destroyer leader that served throughout World War II and was scrapped in 1946.
- HMS Montrose (F236), a Type 23 frigate launched in 1992 and retired in April 2023. Scrapped 2026.

Although there have only been two operational vessels of the Royal Navy named Montrose, traditionally the tender attached to the Tay Division of the Royal Naval Reserve in Dundee was renamed as HMS Montrose in honour of the 6th duke, who was instrumental in the original formation of the Royal Naval Volunteer Reserve in 1903.

== Battle honours ==
- Atlantic 1939–40
- Dunkirk 1940
- Arctic 1942–43
- North Sea 1942–44
- English Channel 1943–44
- Normandy 1944
