= Mary Louise Montagu, Duchess of Hamilton =

British noblewoman (1854–1934)

Her Grace The Duchess of Hamilton OBE

Duchess of Hamilton and Brandon
- Tenure: 10 December 1873 – 16 May 1895 (21 years, 157 days)
- Predecessor: Princess Marie Amelie of Baden
- Successor: Nina Mary Benita Poore
- Other titles: Duchess of Châtellerault; Marchioness of Douglas; Marchioness of Clydesdale; Countess of Selkirk; Countess of Angus; Countess of Lanark; Countess of Arran and Cambridge; Baroness Dutton; Lady Abernethy and Jedburgh Forest; Lady Machanshire and Polmont; Lady Aven and Innerdale
- Born: Lady Marie Louise Elizabeth Montagu; 27 December 1854; Kimbolton Castle
- Died: 10 February 1934 (aged 79)
- Noble family: Montagu; Hamilton (by marriage)
- Spouses: William Douglas-Hamilton, 12th Duke of Hamilton (m. 1873–1895) Robert Forster (m. 1897–1925)
- Issue: Mary Louise Hamilton, Duchess of Montrose
- Father: William Montagu, 7th Duke of Manchester
- Mother: Countess Luise von Alten

Mary Louise Montagu, Duchess of Hamilton (Mary Louise Elizabeth Montagu; 27 December 1854 – 10 February 1934) was the eldest daughter of William Montagu, 7th Duke of Manchester and Countess Luise von Alten. By marriage to William Douglas-Hamilton, 12th Duke of Hamilton, she was Duchess of Hamilton and Brandon.

== Family ==
Lady Mary Louise Elizabeth Montagu was born on 27 December 1854 at Kimbolton Castle as the eldest daughter and second child of William Montagu, 7th Duke of Manchester and Countess Luise von Alten, daughter of Count von Alten of Kingdom of Hanover.

Lady Mary Louise Montagu was regarded by contemporaries as beautiful. She rode horses, played music, and worked with brush, pencil, and needle.

== Duchess of Hamilton ==
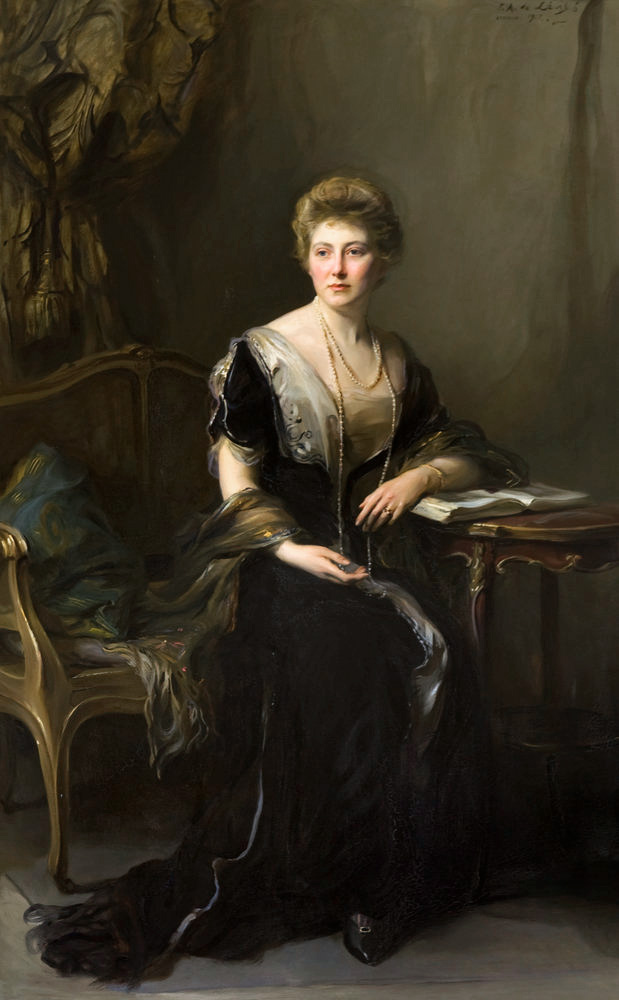
Mary Louise Hamilton, Duchess of Montrose, only daughter of Lady Mary Louise Montagu and her husband, William Douglas-Hamilton, 12th Duke of Hamilton.

On 10 December 1873, the eighteen-year-old Lady Mary Louise Montagu married William Douglas-Hamilton, 12th Duke of Hamilton, eldest son of William Hamilton, 11th Duke of Hamilton and Princess Marie Amelie of Baden at Kimbolton Castle in Cambridgeshire, which had belonged to the Montagu family since 1615. The Duke of Hamilton was a man of the same rank of life as her. As his mother was a princess of Baden, he was also of German descent on one side like her. The couple only had one daughter:

- Lady Mary Louise Hamilton (1 November 1884 – 21 February 1957). Lady Mary Louise Hamilton married James Graham, 6th Duke of Montrose on 14 June 1906 and had four children.

The marriage appears to have been a congenial one. As the Duchess of Hamilton, she took part in the social life associated with the family's estates and was known for hosting gatherings connected with activities such as deer stalking, fishing, steeplechasing, and yachting. Her upbringing and experience prepared her for the social expectations of aristocratic country-house life.

== Later life and death ==
The Duke of Hamilton died on 16 May 1895. As the late duke's only daughter could not inherit her father's title, a fourth cousin of the late duke become the next Duke of Hamilton. The Dowager Duchess of Hamilton then lived a relatively quiet life at Easton Park with her daughter. She was an over-protective mother to Lady Mary. A later account suggests that the Dowager Duchess refused to allow other children to attend her daughter's dancing classes so the classes were populated with chairs to represent the other couples. Just like the Dowager Duchess, Lady Mary was a skilful horsewoman and hunter.

On 20 July 1897, the Dowager Duchess of Hamilton remarried Robert Carnaby Forster of Easton Park, Wickham Market, Suffolk. He died on 24 June 1925. They had no issue.

The Dowager Duchess of Hamilton died on 10 February 1934.

== Orders ==
Mary Louise Elizabeth was awarded the title Officer of the Order of the British Empire in 1918.

== Ancestry ==
Ancestors of Mary Louise Montagu, Duchess of Hamilton

16. George Montagu, 4th Duke of Manchester
8. William Montagu, 5th Duke of Manchester
17. Elizabeth Dashwood
4. George Montagu, 6th Duke of Manchester
18. Alexander Gordon, 4th Duke of Gordon
9. Lady Susan Gordon
19. Jane Maxwell
2. William Montagu, 7th Duke of Manchester
20. Robert Sparrow
10. Robert Bernard Sparrow
21. Mary Brockhaus of Hardwick, Suffolk
5. Millicent Bernard-Sparrow
22. Arthur Acheson, 1st Earl of Gosford
11. Lady Olivia Acheson
23. Millicent Pole
1. Lady Mary Louise Montagu
24. Count August Eberhard von Alten
12. Count Viktor von Alten
25. Baroness Henriette Philippine Marie Hedwig von Vincke-Ostenwalde
6. Count Viktor von Alten
26.
13. Baroness Charlotte von Kinsky und Tettau
27.
3. Countess Luise von Alten
28.
14. Friedrich Christoph von Schminke
29.
7. Hermine von Schminke
30.
15.
31.

== Bibliography ==
- Moore, Doris Langley-Levy (1966). Marie & the Duke of H.: the daydream love affair of Marie Bashkirtseff. Philadelphia, J.B. Lippincott Co.
- Cokayne, George Edward (1892). The Complete Peerage (Edition 1, Volume 4).
- Cokayne, George Edward (1893). The Complete Peerage (Edition 1, Volume 5).
- Beattie, Sarah (5 May 2021). "William Douglas-Hamilton (1845–95), 12th Duke of Hamilton". National Trust for Scotland.
- Sarah Beattie (24 June 2021). "Mary, Duchess of Montrose (1884–1957), née Douglas-Hamilton". National Trust for Scotland.
- Walford (1891). The Windsor Peerage for 1891 (second Year). Chatto & Windus.

Peerage of Scotland
Preceded by Princess Marie Amelie of Baden	Duchess of Hamilton; 10 December 1873 – 16 May 1895	Succeeded by Nina Mary Benita Poore
Preceded by Cecily Louisa Grey-Egerton	Countess of Selkirk; 2 May 1886 – 16 May 1895	Succeeded by Nina Mary Benita Poore
Peerage of Great Britain
Preceded by Princess Marie Amelie of Baden	Duchess of Brandon; 10 December 1873 – 16 May 1895	Succeeded by Nina Mary Benita Poore
French nobility
Preceded by Maraget Douglas	Duchess of Châtellerault; 10 December 1873 – 16 May 1895	Disputed
