= Duchess of Montrose =

Noble title

Duchess of Montrose is the title given to the wife of the Duke of Montrose, an extant title in the Peerage of Scotland and created in 1707 by Queen Anne. The last Duchess, Catherine Graham, who married to the 8th Duke, died in 2014, therefore no one currently holds this title.

== Duchesses of Montrose ==
Name	Birth	Marriage	Became Duchess of Montrose	Spouse	Death	Ceased being Duchess of Montrose	Reason ceased being Duchess
Christian Carnegie		31 March 1702	24 April 1707	James Graham, 1st Duke of Montrose	25 May 1744	7 January 1742	Husband's death
Lucy Manners	1717	28 October 1742		William Graham, 2nd Duke of Montrose	18 June 1788		Died
Caroline Montagu	10 August 1770	24 July 1790	23 September 1790	James Graham, 3rd Duke of Montrose	24 March 1847	30 December 1836	Husband's death
Caroline Beresford	21 August 1818	5 October 1836	30 December 1836	James Graham, 4th Duke of Montrose	16 November 1894	30 December 1874	Husband's death
Violet Graham	10 September 1854	24 July 1876		Douglas Graham, 5th Duke of Montrose	21 November 1940	10 December 1925	Husband's death
Lady Mary Louise Hamilton	1 November 1884	14 June 1906	10 December 1925	James Graham, 6th Duke of Montrose	21 February 1957	20 January 1954	Husband's death
Susan Semple	15 November 1928	17 April 1952	20 January 1954	Angus Graham, 7th Duke of Montrose	13 March 2014	10 February 1992	Husband's death
Catherine Young	5 September 1935	31 January 1970	10 February 1992	James Graham, 8th Duke of Montrose	7 November 2014		Died

== Wives that did not become Duchess of Montrose ==
- Lady Jemima Ashburnham, who married James Graham (later the 3rd Duke), died in 1786, and therefore never became Duchess, as her husband only became the Duke in 1790.
- Isabel Sellar, who married Angus Graham (later the 7th duke), divorced him in 1950, and therefore never became Duchess, as her husband only became the Duke in 1954.

== See also ==
- Duke of Montrose
- Buchanan Castle
- Peerage of Scotland
