= Brodick Castle =

Castle in Brodick, Arran, Scotland

- Outside Brodick, Isle of Arran, Scotland
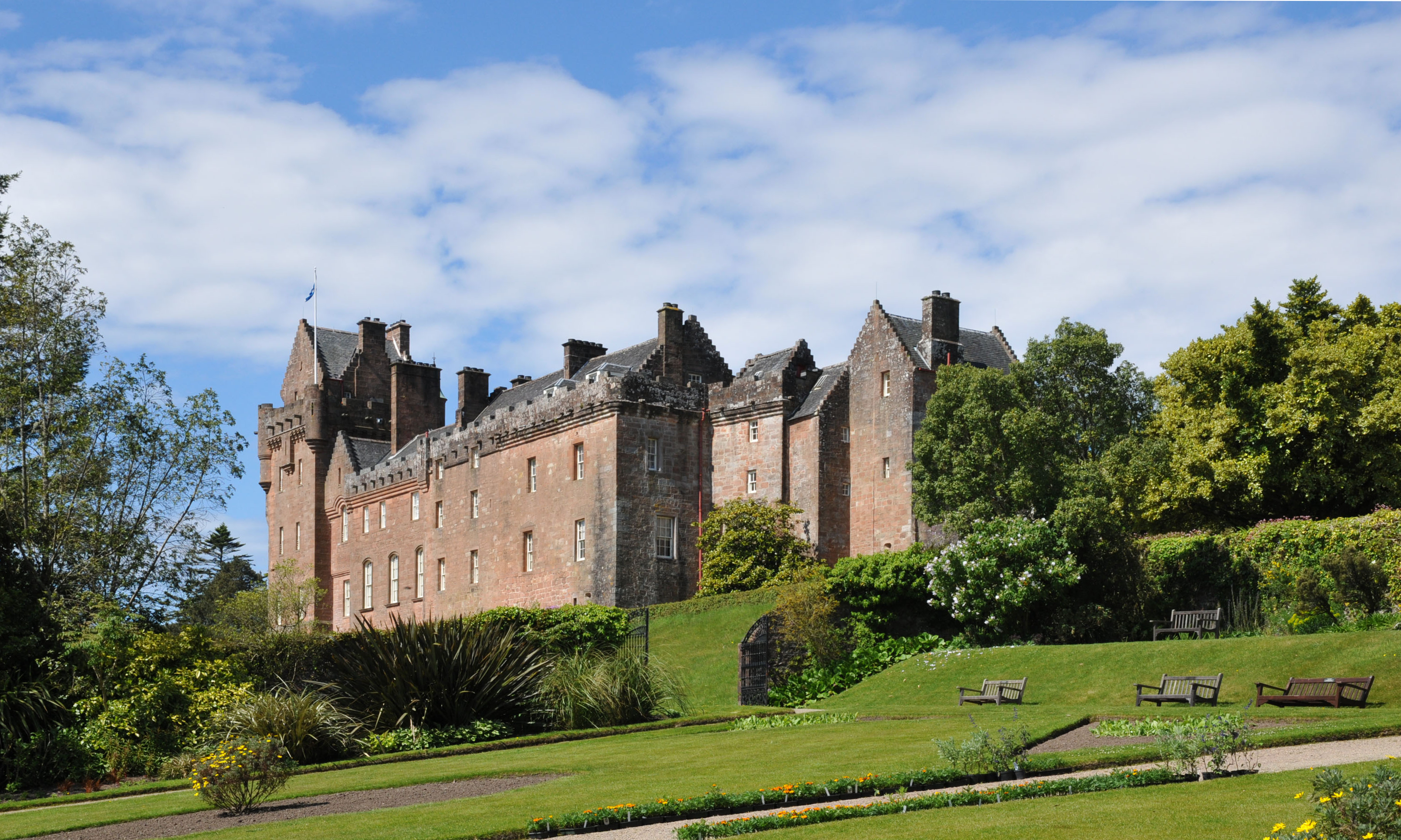
- Brodick Castle (June 2013)

Site information
- Type: Tower house
- Owner: National Trust for Scotland
- Controlled by: Dukes of Hamilton
- Open to the public: Yes
- Condition: Preserved

Location
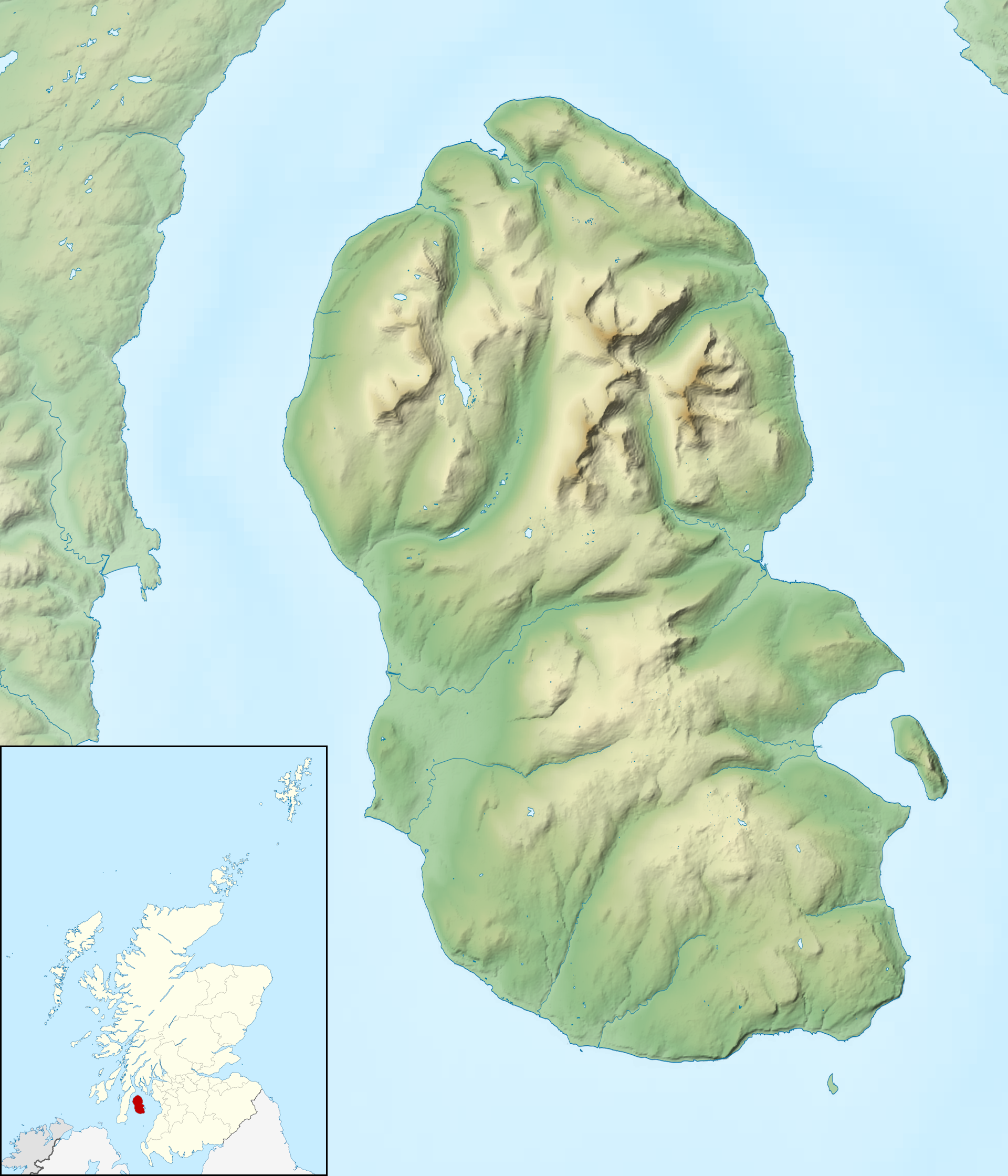
- Shown on Arran
- Coordinates: 55.5940°N 5.1511°W

Site history
- Built: 1510 (site since c.400)
- Built by: Earl of Arran
- In use: Until 1958

Designations

Inventory of Gardens and Designed Landscapes in Scotland
- Official name: Brodick Castle
- Designated: 30 June 1987
- Reference no.: GDL00071

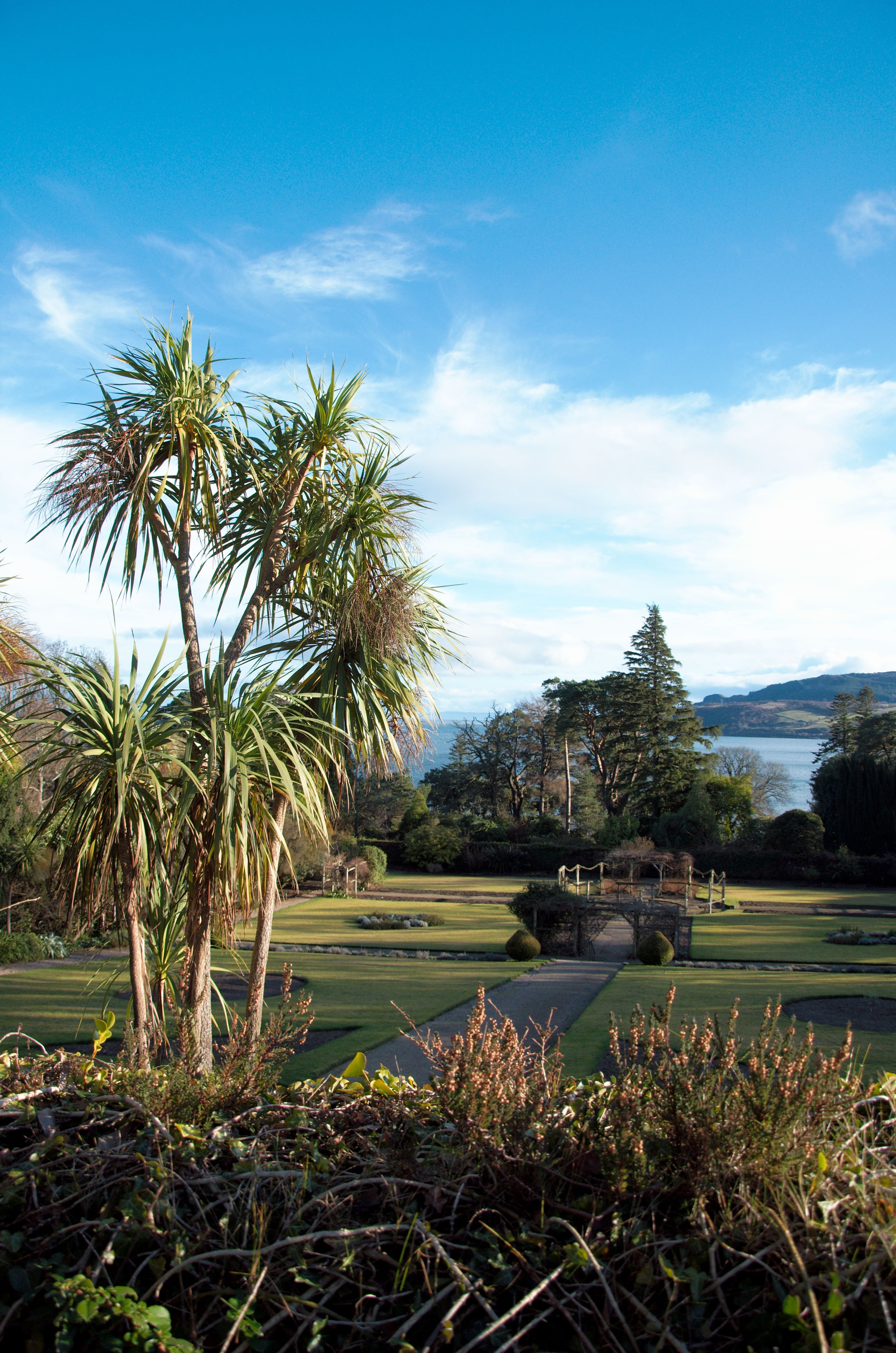
The walled garden at Brodick Castle

Brodick Castle is a castle situated outside the port of Brodick on the Isle of Arran, an island in the Firth of Clyde, Scotland. It was previously a seat of the Dukes of Hamilton, but is now owned by the National Trust for Scotland. The castle is a Category A listed building and the grounds are included in the Inventory of Gardens and Designed Landscapes in Scotland.

== History ==
=== Early and High Medieval ===
A fortress has been on the site since at least the fifth century, when Gaelic invaders from Antrim expanded their kingdom of Dál Riata. By the tenth century Norse influence had grown, and Arran formed part of Sudreys or Súðreyjar, administered either from Dublin or Orkney (Nordreys or Norðreyjar) and nominally under the control of the King of Norway. This can be deduced by the number of Scandinavian place-names on the island including Brodick, or Breiðvík (Broad Bay, also spelt variously Brethwic, Brathwik, Brethwik, Brathwic, Bradewik, and Braizay). The site is thought to have been a centre of relative importance, on account of its strategic position on the Firth of Clyde.

By the mid-thirteenth century Arran was part of the Kingdom of Mann and the Isles ruled by two Gall Gaidheal kings, Magnus of Mann and Dougal of the Isles, sub-rulers of Hákon Hákonarson, King of Norway. Alexander III of Scotland had inherited his father's desire to control the islands in order to stabilise his kingdom, and made numerous unsuccessful advances to that effect. In 1262 the Earl of Ross sacked and pillaged Skye with the king's blessing. King Hákon determined to avenge this slight and set out in July 1263, with a large fighting fleet (leiðangr) for Scotland.

After linking up with the fleets of Magnus and Dougal, and showing his might throughout the Hebrides, Hákon's force anchored in Lamlash Bay on Arran, where they were approached by envoys from the Scots King. The Scots envoys were unsuccessful, and battle was engaged at Largs, a short distance across the firth. Although no rout, the Scots were victorious, and Hákon's forces retreated to Arran, and thence to Orkney to over-winter, where Hákon died. The ensuing Treaty of Perth in 1266 ceded the Sudreys to the Kingdom of Scotland.

=== Interregnum and Wars of Independence ===
When both Alexander III and his heir, Margaret, Maid of Norway died, the Kingdom of Scotland was thrown into turmoil. In 1291, Edward I of England, was called on to choose the most suitable successor. John de Balliol was chosen and was forced to admit Edward as his suzerain. John defied Edward in 1295, and did not answer his request for assistance in his war in France. Edward invaded Scotland the following year and forced John to abdicate. At some point around this time an English garrison was stationed at Brodick. During Robert the Bruces's time in hiding, following his escape from the English after his coronation and defeat at the Battle of Methven, he is said to have had his legendary encounter with a spider on Arran.

On the behest of Robert the Bruce, James Douglas, Lord of Douglas, early in the winter of 1306/07 previous to their attack on Carrick, attacked forces supplying Brodick castle giving a first minor victory and gaining their forces much needed supplies.

Acting with Sir Robert Boyd of Kilmarnock, Douglas was able in January 1307 to dislodge the English from Brodick, one of the first castles to fall to Bruce's forces in his struggle to regain his country.

=== Late Middle Ages ===
The arms of the Chief of Hamilton, showing the Lymphad of the Isles

In 1406 – the same year that James I was captured by English pirates and Robert III died – the castle was badly damaged by an English force that had sailed into Brodick bay. Further destruction was inflicted by John of Islay, Lord of the Isles, in 1455. At some point after 1470 the castle was granted by James III to his brother-in-law, James Hamilton, 1st Lord Hamilton. His son, James Hamilton, 2nd Lord Hamilton was created Earl of Arran in 1503. At this point Hamilton added the Lymphad of the Isles to his Armorial bearings

== The Hamiltons ==
=== Earls of Arran ===
The castle had been rebuilt by the Earl by 1510 in the form of a tower house, but suffered at the hands of the Campbells and the MacLeans. During the "Rough Wooing" of Mary, Queen of Scots, Brodick castle was attacked by an English force led by the Earl of Lennox on behalf of Henry VIII, in revenge for the actions of the 2nd Earl. Lord Arran was the Regent of Scotland whilst Mary was in her infancy, and was second in line to the Scots throne. In 1543, he had been heavily involved in arranging the marriage of Mary to the Dauphin of France, prior to this she had been promised to Edward, Prince of Wales. Arran was rewarded for his efforts, however, and was created Duke of Châtellerault in the Peerage of France. During Regent Arran's tenure at Brodick he continued to enlarge and expand the castle.

In the summer of 1550 Andrew Hamilton and Dean John Slater worked on the building. In March 1552 live partridges and hares were sent to Brodick for the Regent's table and a special boring tool called a "wombill" was bought to make holes at the rabbit warren. In June a carpenter Peter Moffett made new doors. Some timber spars for the new building were supplied by the Laird of Luss on Loch Lomond.

In May 1579 the Earl of Argyll took Brodick for James VI and Ninian Stewart was installed as keeper for the crown. In 1602 Paul Hamilton, captain of Brodick for Marquess of Hamilton, with his companions all armed with pistols attacked a farmer Marrarat MacMillan at North Sannox and took his horse and cattle, and wool and plaids and imprisoned Duncan MacElloway at Brodick.

=== Dukes of Hamilton ===
Brodick Castle did not escape the religious paroxysms that affected seventeenth century life (see the Wars of the Three Kingdoms). In 1639, Scotland was divided between the Presbyterianism of the Lords of the Congregation, and the Episcopalianism favoured by King Charles I. James Hamilton, 3rd marquess of Hamilton, the King's advisor on all things Scottish, was sent north to enforce the King's will, he had previously dissolved the General Assembly of the Church of Scotland when they had abolished the Episcopacy. Archibald Campbell, 1st Marquess of Argyll, was the de facto ruler of Scotland and leader of the presbyterian faction. Argyll seized Hamilton's castle of Brodick. Hamilton was made a Duke in 1643 and recovered his castle the following year at the outbreak of the Scottish Civil War. It was lost again to the Campbells in 1646, as the Royalists fortunes foundered. The Duke was captured after the disastrous Battle of Preston, and faced the block in March 1649. He was succeeded by his brother William, Earl of Lanark, but the second Duke died of wounds received at the Battle of Worcester in 1651. The Duchy of Hamilton and Earldom of Arran passed to the first Duke's only surviving child, Anne. She had been unwittingly sent to Brodick for safety. In 1650, Oliver Cromwell's Roundheads had taken control of the castle and had extended it by building an Artillery battery to defend the Firth at this strategic position.

Duchess Anne returned to her estates in Lanarkshire and West Lothian and in 1656 married William Douglas, 1st Earl of Selkirk. Anne did not return to Brodick, however her husband the newly created Duke of Hamilton for life, used the castle as a base for hunting excursions.

In the following years Brodick was used mainly as an occasional sporting estate. In the nineteenth century, it became residence for the eldest son of the 10th Duke, styled the Marquess of Douglas and Clydesdale.

William, 11th Duke of Hamilton, married in 1843, Princess Marie of Baden, youngest daughter of the Grand Duke of Baden and Stéphanie de Beauharnais, adopted daughter of Napoleon Bonaparte. In 1844, massive building work was undertaken at the castle, almost tripling the size of the building, under the architect James Gillespie Graham. The Twelfth Duke, William, had no male heirs, so although his titles passed to his distant cousin Alfred Douglas-Hamilton upon his death, he entailed the castle upon his only daughter the Lady Mary Louise Douglas-Hamilton. She married the 6th Duke of Montrose in 1906. Unlike in 1651, when the property also passed through the female line and the then spouse assumed the Hamilton name, at this time, after more than five hundred years, Brodick Castle was no longer possessed by someone bearing the Hamilton name.

== Today ==
The Castle and gardens were acquired by the National Trust for Scotland from the Lady Jean Fforde in 1958, in lieu of death duties upon the death of her mother, the Dowager Duchess of Montrose. The 2017 obituary in The Times of London of Lady Jean (who, among other things, had worked at Bletchley Park, the principal centre of Allied code-breaking during the Second World War) quotes her as saying that the loss "of the castle and all its contents . . . was like losing my whole life."

The castle is open to the public during the summer, with Brodick Country Park open all year round. The site welcomed 68,423 visitors during 2019.

A black-and-white copy of William Woollett's engraving of the painting The Death of General Wolfe by Benjamin West can be seen at the castle.

Since 1972, an illustration of the castle has featured on the reverse side of twenty pound notes issued by the Royal Bank of Scotland. The 1998 film The Governess, starring Minnie Driver, was filmed at Brodick Castle.

== Gardens ==
Bee boles can be seen in the Walled Garden, which was built in 1710.

== See also ==
- Banknotes of Scotland (featured on design)
- Home Farm, Brodick

== Bibliography ==
- Coventry, Martin (2006), The Castles of Scotland, Birlinn, ISBN 1-84158-449-5
- Fordun, John of. Chronicle of the Scottish nation ed. Skene 1872.
- ed. Groome, F.H. Ordnance Gazetteer of Scotland, Thomas C. Jack, Edinburgh 1884
- Historic Environment Scotland. "BRODICK CASTLE (GDL00071)".
- Historic Environment Scotland. "BRODICK CASTLE ESTATE, BRODICK CASTLE (Category A Listed Building LB7507)".
- Historic Environment Scotland. "BRODICK CASTLE ESTATE, WALLED GARDEN, TERRACES, GARDEN GATES, SUNDIAL AND COMMEMORATIVE GATES (Category A Listed Building LB7508)".
- Magnusson, Magnus (2000), Scotland: The Story of a Nation, London: HarperCollins, ISBN 9780006531913
- Marshall, Dr Rosalind. The Days of Duchess Anne, Tuckwell Press, East Lothian 2000
- Salter, Mike (1985), Discovering Scottish Castles, Shire Publications Ltd, ISBN 0-85263-749-7
- Stell, Geoffrey P. (2004), "John (John de Balliol) (c.1248x50–1314)", Oxford Dictionary of National Biography, Oxford: Oxford University Press
