= Alfred Douglas-Hamilton, 13th Duke of Hamilton =

Scottish nobleman and sailor

His Grace The Duke of Hamilton TD, DL
- 13th Duke of Hamilton
- Tenure: 1895–1940
- Predecessor: William Douglas-Hamilton, 12th Duke of Hamilton
- Successor: Douglas Douglas-Hamilton, 14th Duke of Hamilton
- Other titles: 10th Duke of Brandon; 9th Earl of Selkirk
- Born: 6 March 1862; Shanklin, Isle of Wight, England
- Died: 16 March 1940 (aged 78); Ferne House, Dorset, England
- Spouse: Nina Mary Benita Poore (m. 1901)
- Issue: Douglas Douglas-Hamilton, 14th Duke of Hamilton; Lady Jean Douglas-Hamilton; George Douglas-Hamilton, 10th Earl of Selkirk; Lady Margaret Douglas-Hamilton; Lord Malcolm Douglas-Hamilton; Lord David Douglas-Hamilton; Lady Mairi Nina Douglas-Hamilton
- Parents: Captain Charles Douglas-Hamilton

Lieutenant Alfred Douglas Douglas-Hamilton, 13th Duke of Hamilton and 10th Duke of Brandon TD, DL (6 March 1862 – 16 March 1940) was a Scottish nobleman and sailor.

== Early life ==
Hamilton was born at Shanklin, Isle of Wight, in 1862, the son of Captain Charles Douglas-Hamilton (1808–1873). His grandfather, Augustus Hamilton, was a son of Charles Powell Hamilton, himself a grandson of James Hamilton, 4th Duke of Hamilton. As a young man, Hamilton was commissioned into the Royal Navy, and held the rank of lieutenant. He gained the reputation for being able to dive under the keels of the battleships on which he served, without any equipment, reappearing on the opposite side of the ship to the amazement of his crewmates. In 1888, his fourth cousin, William Douglas-Hamilton, 12th Duke of Hamilton, persuaded him to leave the navy. By then, he was the heir presumptive of the Duke, who had no son.

== Inheritance ==
There was a serious possibility that Alfred Hamilton would provide a good match for the twelfth duke's daughter, Lady Mary, but such hopes were dashed in 1890, when Hamilton was partially paralysed by a rare tropical disease he had caught while overseas on his last tour of duty.

William Douglas-Hamilton, 12th Duke of Hamilton died on 16 May 1895 and was succeeded by Alfred as the 13th Duke of Hamilton.

The 12th Duke owned extensive estates in England and Scotland; by 1883 these comprised a total of 157,386 acres which produced £73,636 in agricultural income and £67,006 in mineral rents annually. The 12th Duke's estates were valued at £1,902,559 for inheritance tax; under the terms of his will, the Easton and Arran Estates, valued at £374,713, were to pass to his daughter Lady Mary and her descendants; if she died without descendants, these estates were revert to the next Duke of Hamilton. The properties that left the Hamilton family at this time included Brodick Castle on Arran, which had been owned by the Hamiltons for 500 years.

The remainder of the 12th Duke’s estate in Scotland, valued at £1,527,845, was settled as the Hamilton Estates Trust which was to pass to his successors to the Dukedom of Hamilton.

Despite the extensive size of Alfred's inheritance, at the time of the 12th Duke’s death his estates were heavily encumbered by debts amounting to £965,999; the bulk of these were secured on the Scottish estates, except for £117,500 charged on the late Duke’s English Estates. Consequently, in his will the 12th Duke limited the annual amount payable his successor to £10,000 until such time as the debts encumbering the Scottish estates were paid off. The Scottish Estates were also subject to charges which provided for:

- An annuity of £5,000 annuity for the 12th Duke’s widow Mary Louise Montagu, Duchess of Hamilton;
- A Trust fund of £100,000 for his daughter Lady Mary Douglas-Hamilton, which she would become entitled to either when she married or reached the age of majority; until such time as the full amount was conveyed to Lady Mary, she would be entitled to a £5,000 annual interest payment; and,
- A further £7,000 annuity to be paid to Lady Mary for her lifetime.

The substantial debts on the Scottish estates were eventually cleared in 1908, after which Alfred came into full possession of the whole of the net income from the Scottish Estates. In 1916 he initiated legal action against his cousin Lady Mary (then known as the Marchioness of Graham following her marriage to James Graham, Marquess of Graham) and the Trustees of the 12th Duke’s Will regarding the payment of death duties on the 12th Duke’s estates, alleging that the Trustees did not have the power to pay some £36,000 in estate and settlement duties on the estates inherited by Lady Mary from the income of estates which were inherited by the 13th Duke.

During the early 20th century the Hamilton Estates Trust owned 41 coal leaseholds in Scotland, which produced annual royalties averaging £113,793 per year during the period from 1908 to 1918, upon which taxes and rates averaging £20,035 (excluding property tax) were levied each year. In 1922 the Duke disposed of 450 parcels of land comprising 19,363 acres of his estates in Scotland acres of the Hamilton Estates for approximately £330,000, most of which were purchased by the existing tenants of the estates who had been offered the right to buy their landholdings prior to auction.

The 13th Duke's inheritance included Hamilton Palace, the main family seat. As Duke was also the hereditary keeper of the Palace of Holyroodhouse. However, the Duke offered Hamilton Palace to the Royal Navy during the First World War for use as a hospital. Following the end of the war it was considered necessary to demolish it due to subsidence, blamed on the family's own coal mines. Hamilton lived instead at Dungavel House, which had previously been a Hamilton shooting lodge on moorland close to Strathaven.

Hamilton was honorary lieutenant-colonel of the 4th Battalion, Highland Light Infantry.

He was also honorary colonel of the 6th Battalion, the Cameronians (Scottish Rifles).

Hamilton died shortly after his 78th birthday, on 16 March 1940 at the family's property in Dorset, Ferne House.

== Family ==
On 4 December 1901, at the parish church of Newton Tony, Wiltshire, Hamilton married Nina Mary Benita Poore, a daughter of Major Robert Poore. She was later the founder of the Animal Defence and Anti-Vivisection Society. They had four sons and three daughters:

- Douglas Douglas-Hamilton, 14th Duke of Hamilton (1903−1973)
- Lady Jean Douglas-Hamilton (1904−1987)
- George Nigel Douglas-Hamilton, 10th Earl of Selkirk (1906−1994)
- Lady Margaret Douglas-Hamilton (1907–1993), mother of Anneli Drummond-Hay
- Malcolm Avondale Douglas-Hamilton (1909−1964)
- David Douglas-Hamilton (1912−1944)
- Lady Mairi Nina Douglas-Hamilton (1914−1927)

Hamilton's sons made RAF history by all being of the rank of Squadron Leader or above at the outbreak of the Second World War.

Peerage of Scotland
Preceded by William Douglas-Hamilton	Duke of Hamilton; 1895–1940	Succeeded by Douglas Douglas-Hamilton
Preceded by William Douglas-Hamilton	Earl of Selkirk; 1895–1940	Succeeded by George Douglas-Hamilton
Peerage of Great Britain
Preceded by William Douglas-Hamilton	Duke of Brandon; 1895–1940	Succeeded by Douglas Douglas-Hamilton
