= Princess Marie Amelie of Baden =

Duchess of Hamilton and Brandon (1817–1888)

Marie Amelie of Baden
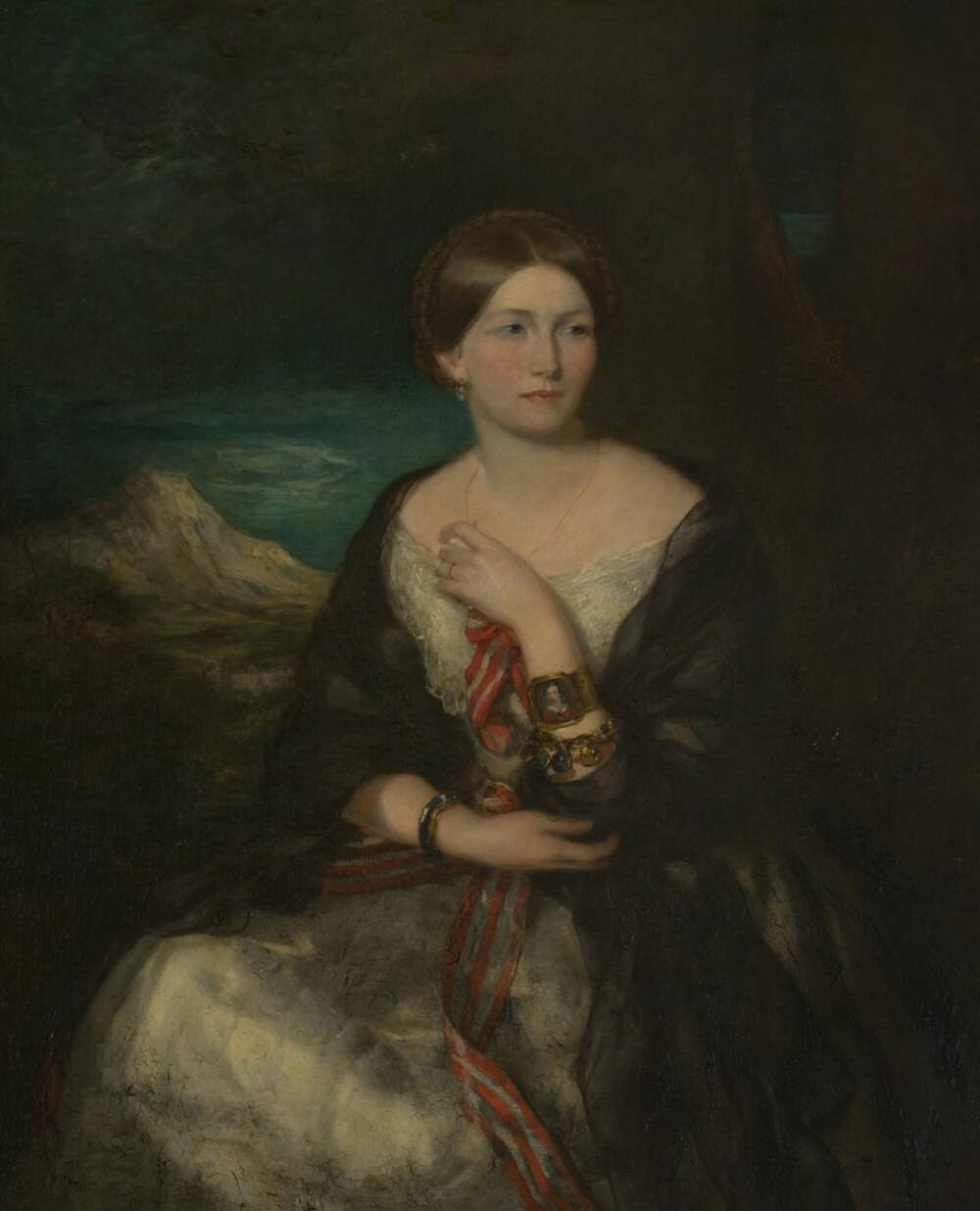

Duchess of Hamilton and Brandon
- Tenure: 18 August, 1852 – 8 July, 1863 (10 years, 324 days)
- Predecessor: Susan Euphemia Beckford
- Successor: Mary Louise Montagu
- Born: 11 October 1817; Karlsruhe, Grand Duchy of Baden
- Died: 17 October 1888 (aged 71); Baden-Baden, German Empire
- Spouse: The 11th Duke of Hamilton (m. 1843; died 1863)
- Issue: The 12th Duke of Hamilton; The 7th Earl of Selkirk; Mary Victoria, Princess Festetics von Tolna, prev. Hereditary Princess of Monaco
Names
- Marie Amelie Elisabeth Karoline
- Father: Charles, Grand Duke of Baden
- Mother: Stéphanie de Beauharnais

Princess Marie Amelie of Baden (Marie Amelie Elisabeth Karoline); 11 October 1817 – 17 October 1888) was the youngest daughter of Charles, Grand Duke of Baden and Stéphanie de Beauharnais. In 1843, she married the Scottish nobleman William, Marquess of Douglas and Clydesdale. They became the Duke and Duchess of Hamilton upon the death of William's father in August 1852. Their only daughter Mary married the future Albert I, Prince of Monaco, and was the mother of Prince Louis II.

Princess Marie Amelie was a cousin of Emperor Napoléon III of the French, as well as a friend of his and his wife's, Empress Eugénie. She often accompanied the couple at official Imperial events, and provided them with lodging when they visited her outside France.

== Family and early life ==
Princess Marie Amelie was born in Karlsruhe, the youngest daughter of Charles, Grand Duke of Baden, and his wife Stéphanie de Beauharnais, the adopted daughter of Napoleon I of France. Charles's daughters married into several great European ruling families. Marie Amelie's older sister Princess Louise married the Swedish prince Gustav, Prince of Vasa, and her other sister Princess Josephine married Karl Anton, Prince of Hohenzollern. Louise was the mother of Queen Carola of Saxony, while Josephine was the mother of Carol I of Romania and Queen Stephanie of Portugal.

== Marriage ==
On 23 February 1843, she married the Scottish nobleman William Hamilton, Marquess of Douglas and Clydesdale, the only son of the 10th Duke of Hamilton. The couple had two sons and one daughter: William (later 12th Duke of Hamilton), Charles (later 7th Earl of Selkirk and Lieutenant of 11th Hussars), and Lady Mary Victoria (later wed to Albert I, Prince of Monaco in 1869).

After her wedding, she relocated to Brodick Castle on the Isle of Arran, which was extended and remodeled at her request in the Bavarian style. She stated the castle in its original form was too small for entertaining guests and raising her family. She later moved to Hamilton Palace in Lanarkshire, Scotland. Her husband succeeded as Duke of Hamilton upon the death of her father-in-law in 1852. The Duke at least mainly lived in Baden-Baden and Paris after his marriage.

== Duchess of Hamilton ==
The Duchess was a cousin and friend of Emperor Napoléon III of the French. She and her husband accompanied Napoleon during his official state entry into Paris in 1852, and she was present in 1860 when he visited her in Baden, at a popular summer resort for Paris's upper classes. She also accompanied the Emperor at an 1855 celebration in honor of King Victor Emmanuel II of Sardinia and the 1856 baptism of Napoléon, Prince Imperial. Napoleon's wife, Empress Eugénie, was also reported as being a friend of Marie, and the Empress would often stay with Marie when she visited Baden and Scotland. Eugénie angered many when she insisted that Princess Marie take precedence and be seated with the Imperial Family. In 1860, an exhausted Eugénie wished to leave France but found that her destinations on the continent were limited due to political concerns; Princess Marie, sympathetic to her plight, successfully offered Eugénie a stay at her husband's home in Scotland.

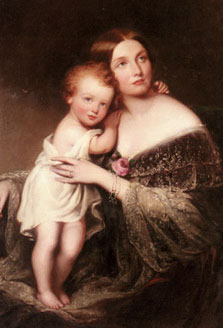
Princess Marie with one of her children

In 1853, the Glasgow Free Press reported that the Duchess had converted to Roman Catholicism. Stéphanie de Beauharnais died seven years later. Queen Sophie of the Netherlands, a friend of Stéphanie's, later claimed that Marie Amelie "behaved ill to her" mother, blaming this on her "Catholic bigotry". Sophie was particularly upset that the Duchess of Hamilton failed to see her mother on her deathbed, though her husband did make the visit. Five years later, in an 1867 letter, Queen Sophie described Marie Amelie as "bloodless, fat, sick," and complained that her sons were "restless and bad," while her daughter was "far from handsome."

Princess Marie gave £20 to establish a Catholic school in Hamilton, opened on 17 January 1853. The funds were used to purchase classroom items and pay the teacher's salary. Afterwards she made an annual donation of £20 for the upkeep of the school. She also donated items for St Mary's Church for the celebration of Mass and gave money for a set of stations of the cross, a new altar and two side altars. The Duchess often attended services in St Mary's.

In 1863, the Duke collapsed while dining at the Maison dorée, Boulevard des Italiens in Paris. Once his party realised his condition was serious, he was brought back to Hôtel Bristol in Place Vendôme. Marie Amelie arrived at his side, and while he seemed to be recovering, he died suddenly three days later, on 15 July 1863. He was fifty-two years old. His wealth at death was estimated at under £140,000. She was styled Marie Amelie, Princess of Baden, Dowager Duchess of Hamilton, after her husband's death.

Princess Marie occupied the Villa Stephanie in Baden-Baden, where her daughter used to visit her annually. In 1904, the contemporary journal Lady's Realm reported that the place was the "rendezvous of the very best cosmopolitan society." She was a friend of Albert Edward, Prince of Wales. As of 1867, she and her son were being associated with a disreputable company, the type that his mother Queen Victoria urged him to avoid. Marie also paid and received visits to members of the British Royal Family, including the Duchess of Kent and Queen Victoria. She died in Baden-Baden, aged 71.

In 1869, her only daughter Lady Mary Victoria Hamilton married Prince Albert (later Albert I), son and heir of Charles III, Prince of Monaco. The union was unhappy, however, and Mary left Monaco and her husband after giving birth to an heir, Louis II. The marriage was annulled in 1880. She later married the Hungarian magnate Prince Tasziló Festetics, living from that point onwards mainly in her husband's native country. Through Mary, Marie is the great-great-grandmother of the current reigning prince of Monaco, Albert II.

== Issue ==
The Duke and Duchess of Hamilton had two sons and one daughter

1. William Douglas-Hamilton, 12th Duke of Hamilton (12 March 1845 – 16 May 1895) he married Lady Mary Montagu on 10 December 1873 and had issue.
2. Charles Hamilton, 7th Earl of Selkirk (18 May 1847 – 2 May 1886)
3. Lady Mary Victoria Hamilton (11 December 1850 – 14 May 1922) she married Albert I, Prince of Monaco on 21 September 1869 but divorced on 28 July 1880. They had issue. She remarried Tassilo, Prince Festetics de Tolna on 2 June 1880. They had issue.

== Ancestry ==
Ancestors of Princess Marie Amelie of Baden

8. Charles Frederick, Grand Duke of Baden
4. Charles Louis, Hereditary Prince of Baden
9. Princess Caroline Louise of Hesse-Darmstadt
2. Charles, Grand Duke of Baden
10. Louis IX, Landgrave of Hesse-Darmstadt
5. Princess Amalie of Hesse-Darmstadt
11. Countess Palatine Caroline of Zweibrücken
1. Princess Marie Amelie of Baden
12. Claude de Beauharnais, comte des Roches-Baritaud
6. Claude de Beauharnais, comte des Roches-Baritaud
13. Marie-Anne-Françoise Mouchard de Chaban
3. Stéphanie de Beauharnais
14. Claude, marquis de Lézay-Marnézia
7. Claudine Françoise de Lézay-Marnézia
15. Marie-Claudine de Nettancourt, dame de Vaubécourt
