= Manorial Society of Great Britain =

The Manorial Society of Great Britain Limited is a private limited company by Guarantee incorporated on 30 December 1996 with a membership of approximately 1,900 Lords of the Manor, feudal barons, peers, and historians mainly from the United Kingdom and Ireland. The society aims to promote the study of English history, specifically the monarchy and parliamentary institutions, while preserving manorial records and fostering comradeship among those with similar interests.

== Governance ==
The Governing Council of the Manorial Society of Great Britain in 2018 includes the following members of the British peerage and knightage amongst whom one usually hosts an annual reception at the House of Lords.

- The Right Honourable the 10th Earl of Shannon
- The Right Honourable the Lord Sudeley, MA (Oxon), FSA
- The Right Honourable Sir Desmond Lorenz de Silva, QC, PC, KStJ
- Mr Cecil Humphery-Smith, OBE, FSA

== Original foundation ==
The original Manorial Society was established as a pressure group in 1906 but did not long survive. Another organization claiming to be a revival was registered in 1995 as "The Manorial Society Limited" under Company registration No. 03111590. Both organizations are no longer connected to the original society.

== Source of information ==
Her Majesty's Land Registry refers to the Manorial Society of Great Britain as a source of information in assisting research on manors as officially indicated on HMLR Practice Guide 22.

== Publications ==
In 1996 the Society co-published a guide to Manorial Law.

In 2012 the Society published a Manorial Directory, listing a number of surviving manorial lordships and feudal baronies in Great Britain and Ireland, with their histories and biographical information on their current holders.
