= James Graham, 6th Duke of Montrose =

Scottish nobleman, naval officer and politician

Commodore His Grace The Duke of Montrose KT CB CVO VD JP DL
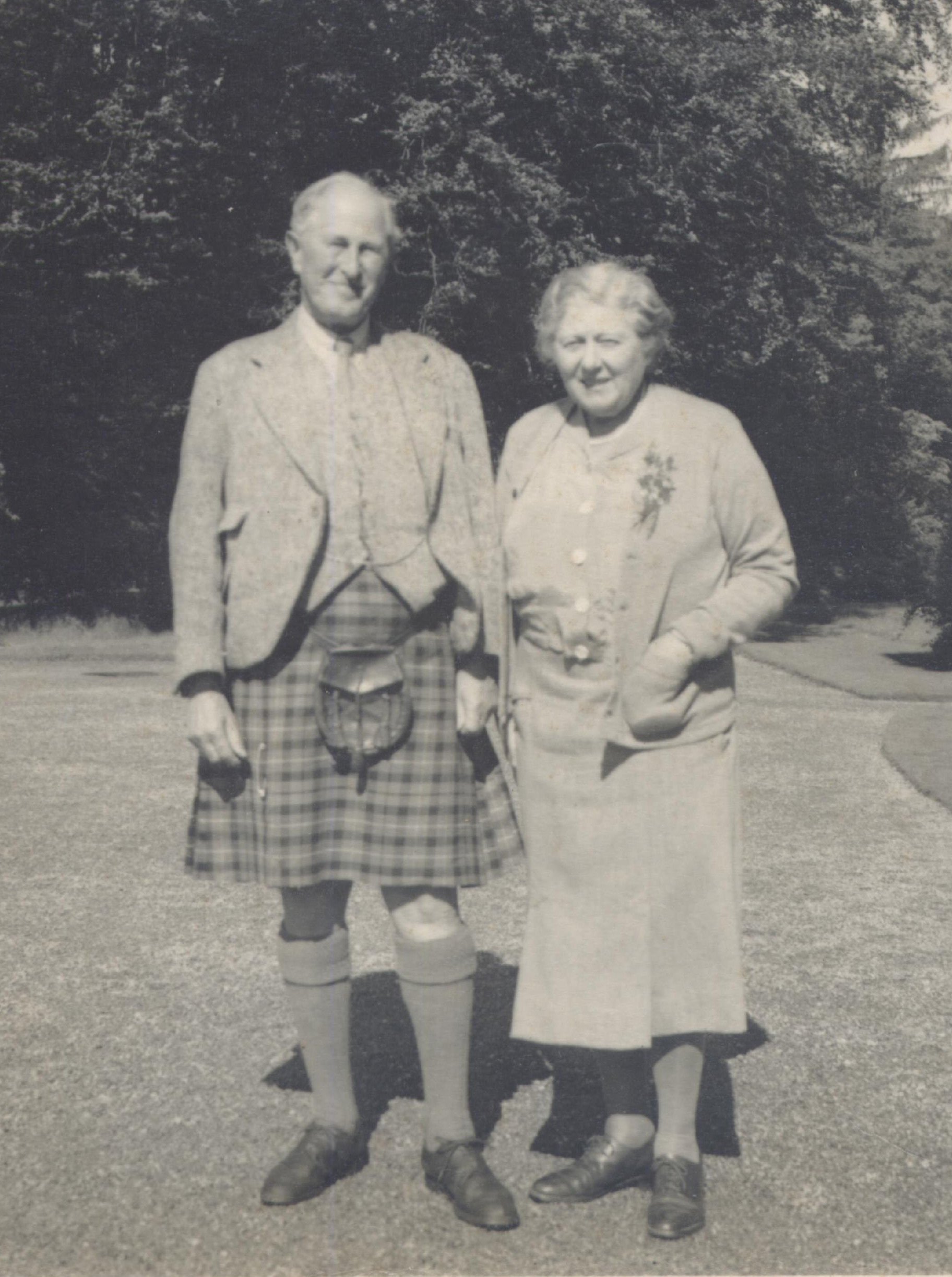
- The Duke and Duchess of Montrose in the 1940s

Member of the House of Lords Lord Temporal
- In office 10 December 1925 – 20 January 1954; Hereditary Peerage
- Preceded by: The 5th Duke of Montrose
- Succeeded by: The 7th Duke of Montrose

Personal details
- Born: James Graham; 1 May 1878 Belgravia, London, England
- Died: 20 January 1954 (aged 75) Buchanan Castle, Stirlingshire, Scotland
- Party: Scottish Party
- Spouse: Lady Mary Louise Hamilton (m. 1906)
- Children: 4, including Angus and Jean
- Parent(s): Douglas Graham, 5th Duke of Montrose; Violet Graham
- Military career
- Allegiance: United Kingdom
- Branch: Royal Navy
- Service years: 1903–1927
- Rank: Commodore
- Conflicts: First World War
- Awards: CB, CVO, VD

Commodore James Graham, 6th Duke of Montrose, KT, CB, CVO, VD, JP, DL (1 May 1878 – 20 January 1954), styled Marquess of Graham until 1925, was a Scottish nobleman, naval officer, politician and engineer. He took the first film of a solar eclipse and is credited as the inventor of the aircraft carrier.

== Personal life ==
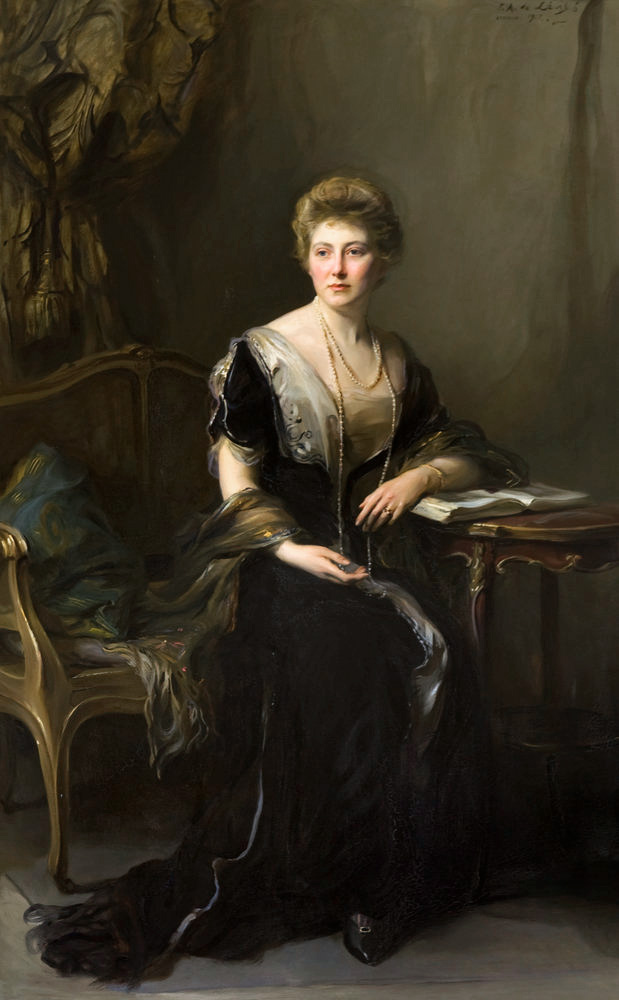
Lady Mary Louise Douglas-Hamilton, portrait by Philip de László, 1912

The eldest son of Douglas Graham, 5th Duke of Montrose, James Graham was educated at Eton College. In 1906 he married Lady Mary Douglas-Hamilton, the only child of the 12th Duke of Hamilton. They had four children: James (later the 7th Duke), Lady Mary Graham, Lord Ronald Graham and Lady Jean Graham.

== Career ==
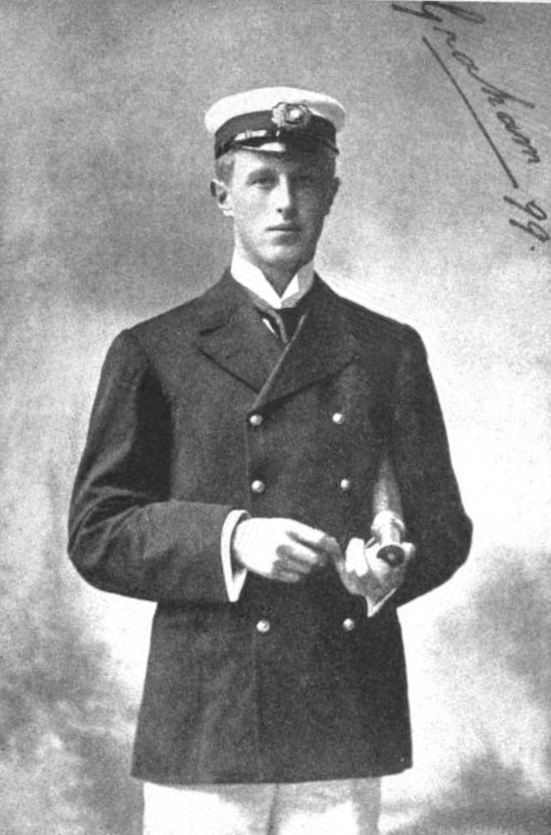
As a junior officer in 1899

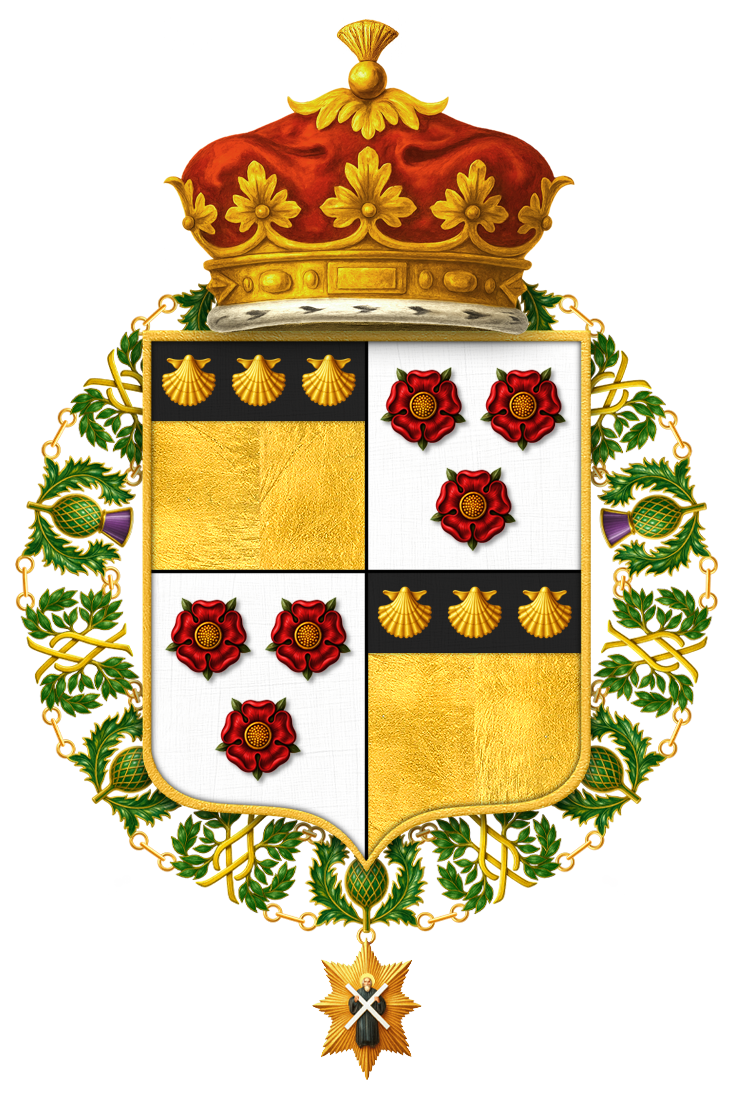
Shield of Arms of James Graham, 6th Duke of Montrose, KT, CB, CVO, VD, JP, DL

As a mariner, he served in the Mercantile Marine and ASC in South Africa, during which time he obtained the first film ever taken of a total eclipse of the Sun during a Royal Astronomical Society expedition to India in 1899, and took part in a mission in 1900 for Lloyd's of London to the South African Government to establish wireless telegraphic stations on the coast. Having been instrumental in founding the Royal Navy Volunteer Reserve (RNVR) in 1903, he served during World War I and was later Commodore of the RNVR Clyde Division, then the East Coast of Scotland RNVR. On 12 October 1921, he was promoted Commodore 2nd Class and appointed Commodore of the entire RNVR, serving in this role until his retirement in 1927. As a result, from 1946 to 1968, whichever ship was attached to the Tay Division of the Royal Naval Reserve (in Dundee) was always temporarily renamed HMS Montrose after the 6th Duke. In 1992, the seventh Duke-class frigate Montrose was so-named for the same reason.

In his political life, he was unpaid assistant private secretary to the Chancellor of the Exchequer in 1905, and Naval Aide-de-Camp to His Majesty. However, he was unsuccessful as the Scottish Unionist Party (effectively the Conservative Party in Scotland) parliamentary candidate for Stirlingshire in 1906, and as the Conservative Party candidate at the 1906 by-election at Eye, Suffolk, and at the subsequent general election in 1910; although holding the courtesy title of the Marquess of Graham from 1907 (when his father was the 5th Duke), he contested these elections as James Graham. He entered the House of Lords as the 6th Duke when he succeeded to the title in 1925. When the Home Rule movement decided to split from the avowedly anti-Home Rule Scottish Unionist Party in 1932, he became chairman of the new centre-right Scottish Party, and successfully steered it towards a merger with the centre-left National Party of Scotland in April 1934, therefore founding the modern Scottish National Party. He was elected the first President of the SNP, but joined the Liberal Party in 1936. During the 1933 Kilmarnock by-election campaign he made a prominent speech in support of the candidature of Alexander MacEwen, who would go on to be the first leader of the SNP, in the Grand Hall, Kilmarnock. In this speech he addressed the issue of the position of the relationship between Scottish home rule supporters and the Scotland's Irish community While he stated that he had "nothing but friendly feelings for the Irish", he added that when Ireland achieved Home Rule, "Scottish men and women were disenfranchised" and stated "as they did to us we should do to them and others."

As an engineer, he was the inventor of the world's first naval aircraft carrier, when in 1912, as a director of William Beardmore and Company of Dalmuir, he designed a 14,450 GRT merchant vessel intended for delivery to the Lloyd Sabaudo Line of Italy as the SS Conte Rosso. When war broke out in 1914, work on the vessel ceased, but was resumed in 1916 as an aircraft carrier. The conversion work was completed in September 1918, and the vessel was commissioned as HMS Argus – recognised as the first ever "flat top". The Duke was also designer and owner of the first seagoing heavy oil motorship.

He was president of the British Institution of Marine Engineers in 1911, and president of the Junior Institution of Engineers in 1916 and 1917. Afterwards, he was vice-president of the Institution of Naval Architects, a Younger Brother of Trinity House, a trustee for the Honourable Company of Master Mariners, a member of the Royal Company of Archers, and commodore of the Sea Cadets in Scotland. In 1935 he became the second president on the National Institute for the Deaf, a post he held until his death.

== Honours ==
He was Lord Lieutenant of Buteshire from 1920 until 1953 and was Lord High Commissioner to the General Assembly of the Church of Scotland in 1942 and 1943. He was appointed a Commander of the Royal Victorian Order in 1905, a Companion of the Bath in 1911 and a Knight of the Thistle in 1947. He was awarded an honorary degree by the University of Glasgow in 1931, at which time he was described by the University as being a "great and distinguished Scotsman".

== Death ==
The Duke was staying at Turnberry Hotel in January 1954 when he suffered what was described as a slight stroke. However, his condition quickly worsened and he died at Drymen on 20 January, about a week after the onset of his illness.

== Publications ==
- My Ditty Box, The Duke of Montrose. Jonathan Cape, London, 1952

Honorary titles
Preceded by The Marquess of Bute	Lord Lieutenant of Buteshire; 1920–1953	Succeeded by Lord Colum Crichton-Stuart
Party political offices
Preceded by New position	President of the Scottish National Party; 1934–1936	Succeeded by Roland Muirhead
Peerage of Scotland
Preceded by Douglas Graham	Duke of Montrose; 1925–1954	Succeeded by James Angus Graham
