= William Douglas-Hamilton, 12th Duke of Hamilton =

Scottish nobleman

His Grace The Duke of Hamilton KT
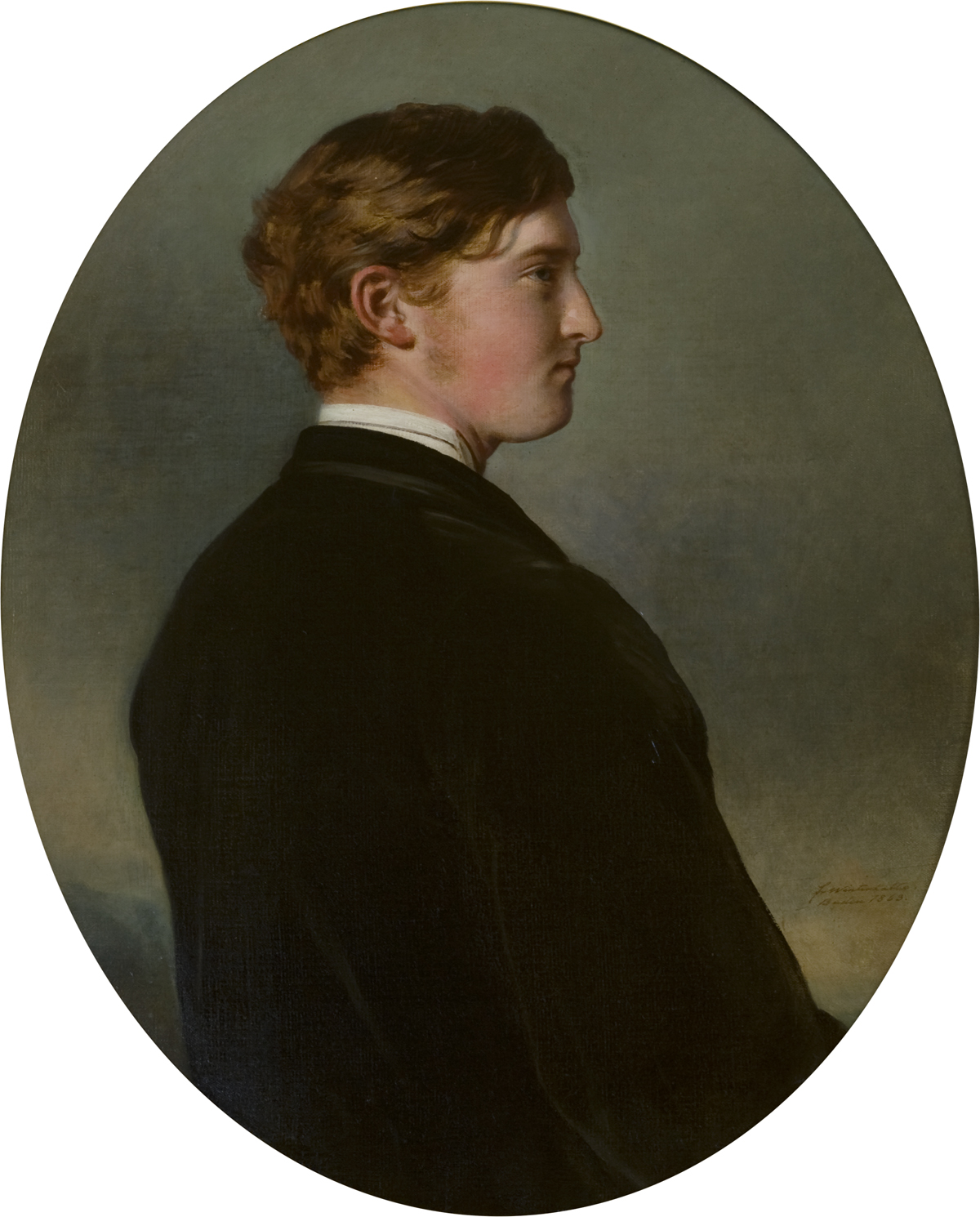
- Portrait by Franz Xaver Winterhalter, 1863
- Tenure: 1863–1895
- Predecessor: William Hamilton, 11th Duke of Hamilton
- Successor: Alfred Douglas-Hamilton, 13th Duke of Hamilton
- Other titles: 9th Duke of Brandon; 2nd Duke of Châtellerault; 8th Earl of Selkirk
- Born: 12 March 1845; Paddington, London, England
- Died: 16 May 1895 (aged 50); Algiers, Algeria
- Buried: 1895 Hamilton Mausoleum; 1921 Isle of Arran
- Spouse: Lady Mary Louise Montagu (m. 1873)
- Issue: Mary Louise Hamilton, Duchess of Montrose
- Parents: William Hamilton, 11th Duke of Hamilton; Princess Marie Amelie of Baden

William Alexander Louis Stephen Douglas-Hamilton, 12th Duke of Hamilton, 9th Duke of Brandon, 2nd Duke of Châtellerault KT (12 March 1845 – 16 May 1895), styled Marquess of Douglas and Clydesdale until 1863, was a Scottish nobleman.

== Early life and education ==
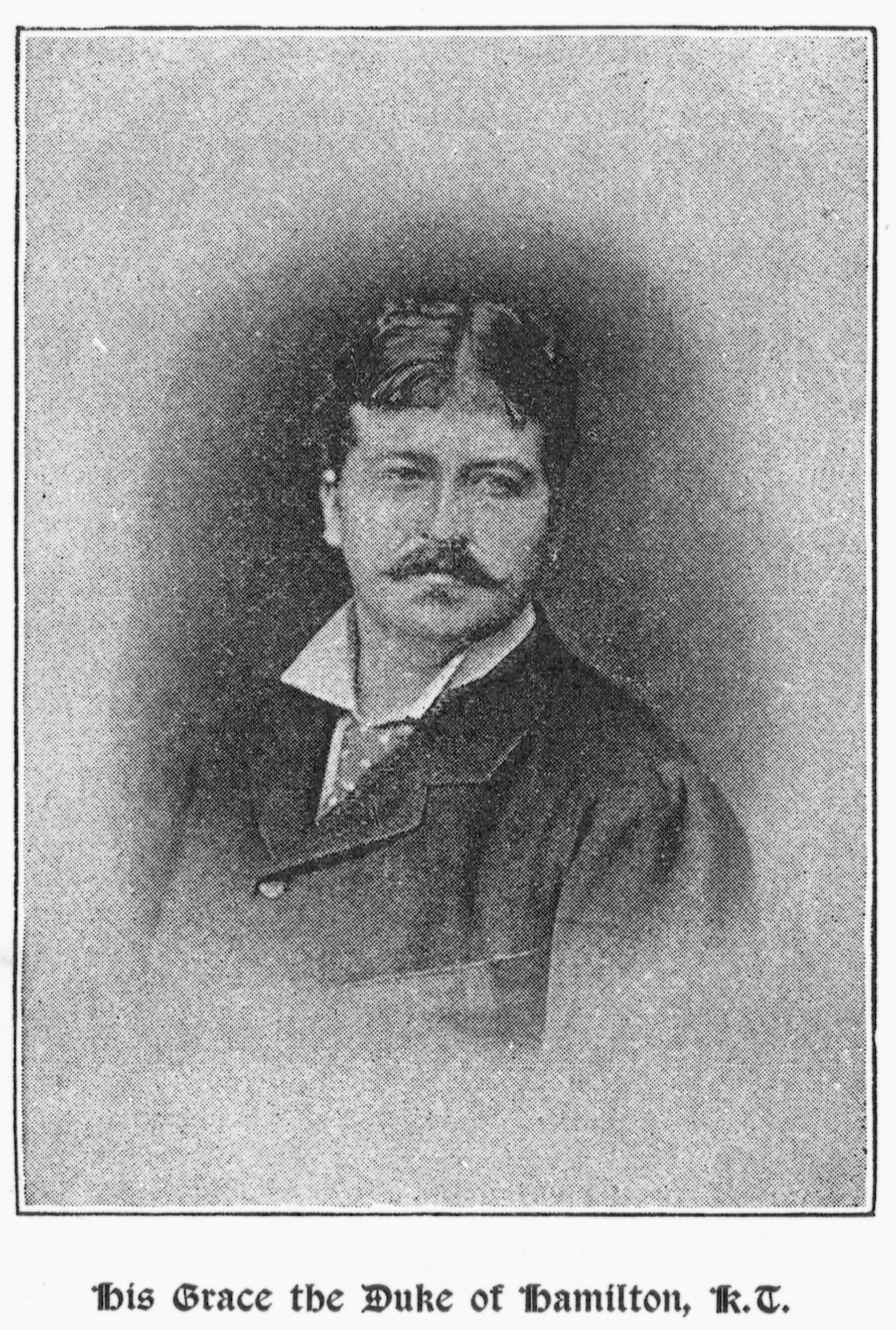
Pictured in Suffolk Celebrities, 1893

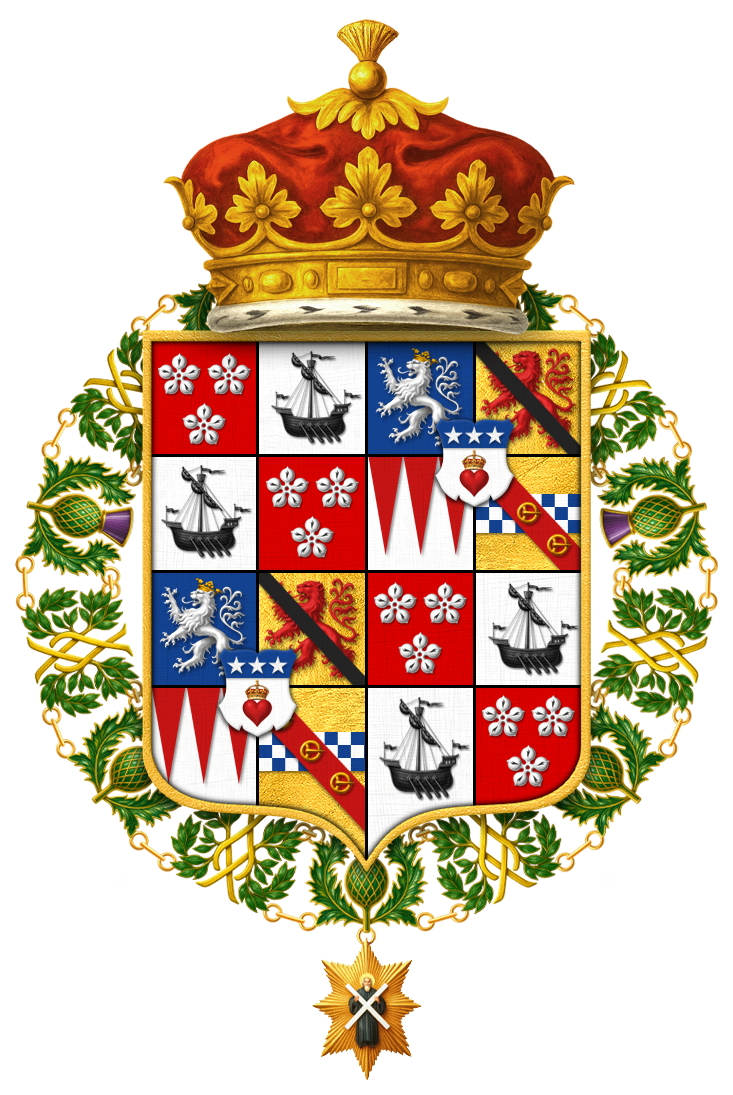
Shield of Arms of William Alexander Louis Stephen Douglas-Hamilton, 12th Duke of Hamilton, 9th Duke of Brandon, KT

Hamilton was born at Connaught Place, London, the second but first surviving son of William Hamilton, 11th Duke of Hamilton and Princess Marie of Baden, the adoptive granddaughter of Napoleon Bonaparte. Through his mother, Hamilton was related to numerous European royal families. Among his first cousins were King Carol I of Romania and Queen Stephanie of Portugal (children of his aunt Princess Josephine) and Queen Carola of Saxony (daughter of his aunt Princess Louise Amelie of Baden).

Although his name was listed on the registrar at Eton College, he never attended and was educated privately. He spent much of his childhood at his mother's home in Baden-Baden, Villa Stephanie, while he spent summers in Paris. Thus he was fluent in German and French.

At age 18, he went to Christ Church, Oxford. A description of Hamilton pertaining to this period in his life has this description of him to offer:

"At Christchurch, he went in for boxing, as he went in later for horse-racing, yachting and other amusements... He was full bodied, of a rudely ruddy complexion, had a powerful neck, and seemed strong enough to fell an ox with his fist... He had a frankness of speech bordering on rudeness".

== Dukedom ==
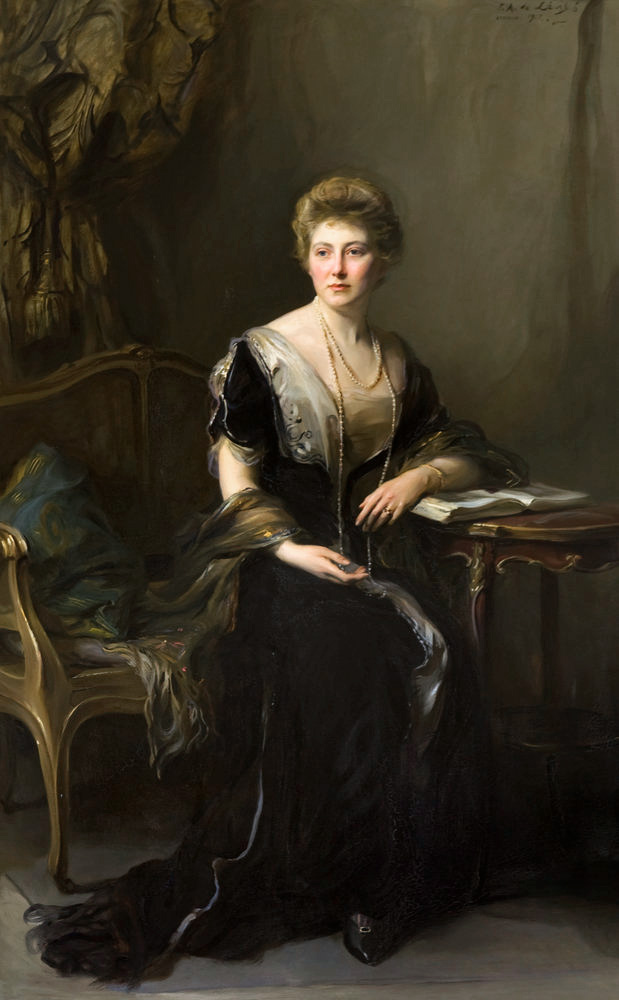
Hamilton's daughter Mary, Duchess of Montrose. Portrait by Philip de László, 1912.

In July 1863, Hamilton's father died suddenly in Paris, and 18-year-old Hamilton became the 12th Duke of Hamilton. His inheritance was not great, for the 11th Duke, having married a princess, had lived in befitting style. Among other things, he had purchased a Wimbourne House in London from the Duke of Beaufort for the vast sum of £60,000 (equivalent to £7,242,000 in 2025) and lavished further monies on that property over the period of a decade.

The 11th Duke had also built extensively in Scotland, almost tripling the size of Brodick Castle and remodeling it in Bavarian style in honour of his wife. At his death, he left an estate valued at £140,000 (equivalent to £15,208,000 in 2025), to be divided between his wife and three children. Hamilton did inherit a significant portion of this estate, but by 1867, he was close to financial ruin when providentially, his race horse Cortolvin won the Grand National Steeplechase at Aintree. In addition to substantial prize money, Hamilton also took some £16,000 (equivalent to £155,000 in 2025) from the bookmakers, restoring his fortune substantially. However, his mother (who had inherited the house in London), still found it necessary or prudent to sell that property, and it was auctioned in that same year (1867). He owned 157,000 acres mostly in Bute, Lanark and Suffolk.

In 1869, Hamilton's younger sister, Mary, married Albert I, Prince of Monaco. She left her husband within two years of marriage, was later divorced from him and then married a Hungarian count, but her son would nevertheless succeed to the throne of Monaco as Louis II, Prince of Monaco; all future rulers of Monaco are descended from her.

== Marriage and issue ==
On 10 December 1873, Hamilton married Lady Mary Louise Montagu, daughter of William Montagu, 7th Duke of Manchester and Countess Luise von Alten, at Kimbolton Castle. They had one daughter:

- Lady Mary Louise Douglas-Hamilton (1 November 1884 – 21 February 1957), she married James Hamilton, Marquess of Graham (who succeeded as 6th Duke of Montrose in 1925) on 14 June 1906. They had four children.

== Death and succession ==
Hamilton died at Algiers on 16 May 1895, aged 50, of dropsy after several years of suffering from Bright's disease.

The title passed to his fourth-cousin, Alfred, who became the 13th Duke of Hamilton.

The 12th Duke owned extensive estates in England and Scotland; by 1883 these comprised a total of 157,386 acres which produced £73,636 in agricultural income and £67,006 in mineral rents annually. His estates were valued at £1,902,559 for inheritance tax; under the terms of his will, the Easton Park and Arran Estates (including Brodick Castle), valued at £374,713, were to pass to his daughter Lady Mary and her descendants; if she died without descendants, these estates were revert to the next Duke of Hamilton.

The remainder of the 12th Duke’s estate in Scotland, valued at £1,527,845, was settled as the Hamilton Estates Trust which was to pass to his successors to the Dukedom of Hamilton. Despite his vast income and extensive landholdings, at the time of the 12th Duke’s death his estates were heavily encumbered by debts amounting to £965,999; the bulk of these were secured on the Scottish estates, except for £117,500 charged on his English Estates. Consequently, in his will the 12th Duke limited the annual amount payable his successor to £10,000 until such time as the debts encumbering the Scottish estates were paid off. The Scottish Estates were also subject to charges which provided for:

- An annuity of £5,000 annuity for the 12th Duke’s widow Mary Louise Montagu, Duchess of Hamilton;
- A Trust of £100,000 for his daughter Lady Mary Douglas-Hamilton, which she would become entitled to either when she married or reached the age of majority; until such time as the full amount was conveyed to Lady Mary, she would be entitled to a 5,000 annual interest payment; and,
- A further £7,000 annuity to be paid to Lady Mary for her lifetime.

The substantial debts on the Scottish estates would not be cleared until 1908.

== Ancestry ==
Ancestors of William Douglas-Hamilton, 12th Duke of Hamilton

16. James Hamilton, 5th Duke of Hamilton
8. Archibald Hamilton, 9th Duke of Hamilton
17. Anne Spencer
4. Alexander Hamilton, 10th Duke of Hamilton
18. Alexander Stewart, 6th Earl of Galloway
9. Lady Harriet Stewart
19. Lady Catherine Cochrane
2. William Hamilton, 11th Duke of Hamilton
20. William Beckford
10. William Thomas Beckford
21. Maria Hamilton
5. Susan Beckford
22. Charles Gordon, 4th Earl of Aboyne
11. Lady Margaret Gordon
23. Lady Margaret Stewart
1. William Douglas-Hamilton, 12th Duke of Hamilton
24. Charles Frederick, Grand Duke of Baden
12. Charles Louis, Hereditary Prince of Baden
25. Princess Caroline Louise of Hesse-Darmstadt
6. Charles, Grand Duke of Baden
26. Louis IX, Landgrave of Hesse-Darmstadt
13. Landgravine Amalie of Hesse-Darmstadt
27. Countess Palatine Henriette Caroline of Zweibrücken
3. Princess Marie Amelie of Baden
28. Claude de Beauharnais, 1st Count des Roches-Baritaud
14. Claude de Beauharnais, 2nd Count des Roches-Baritaud
29. Marie-Anne-Françoise Mouchard
7. Stéphanie de Beauharnais
30. Claude François de Lézay-Marnézia, 3rd Marquis of Lézay
15. Claudine Françoise de Lézay-Marnézia
31. Marie Claudine de Nettancourt-Vaubécourt

Peerage of Scotland
Preceded by William Hamilton	Duke of Hamilton; 1863–1895	Succeeded by Alfred Douglas-Hamilton
Preceded by Charles Douglas-Hamilton	Earl of Selkirk; 1886–1895	Succeeded by Alfred Douglas-Hamilton
Peerage of Great Britain
Preceded by William Hamilton	Duke of Brandon; 1863–1895	Succeeded by Alfred Douglas-Hamilton
French nobility
Preceded by James Hamilton	Duke of Châtellerault; 1864–1895	Disputed
