= Carola of Vasa =

Queen of Saxony from 1873 to 1902

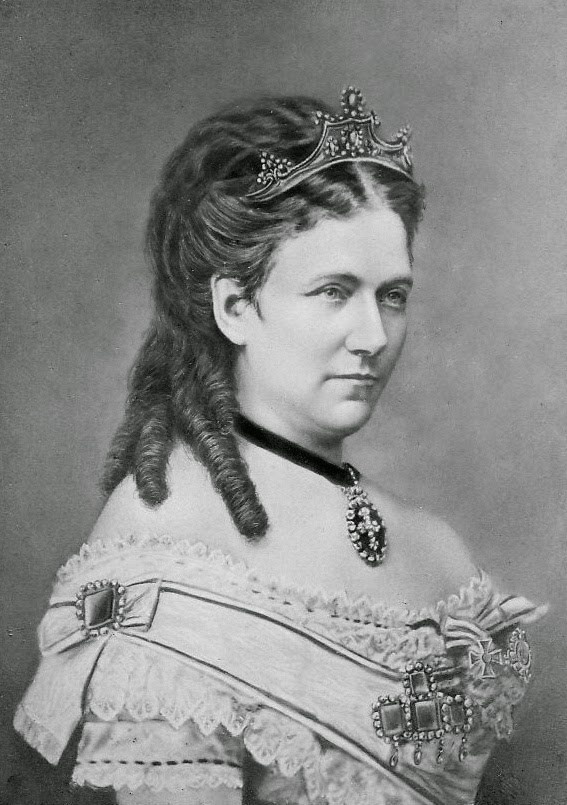
- Carola as crown princess in c. 1865

Queen consort of Saxony
- Tenure: 29 October 1873 – 19 June 1902
- Born: 5 August 1833; Schönbrunn Palace, Vienna, Austrian Empire
- Died: 15 December 1907 (aged 74); Dresden, Kingdom of Saxony, German Empire
- Burial: Katholische Hofkirche
- Spouse: Albert, King of Saxony (m. 1853; died 1902)
Names
- Caroline Friederike Franziska Stephanie Amalie Cäcilie
- House: Holstein-Gottorp
- Father: Gustav, Prince of Vasa
- Mother: Princess Louise Amelie of Baden

Carola of Vasa (Caroline Friederike Franziska Stephanie Amalie Cäcilie; 5 August 1833 – 15 December 1907) was a titular princess of Sweden by birth and styled Princess of Vasa as member of the House of Holstein-Gottorp. By marriage to Albert, King of Saxony, she was the last Queen of Saxony.

At the side of her husband, Carola dedicated herself to the charitable development of new social institutions in the Kingdom of Saxony. With the founding of the Albert Association (German: Albertverein) in 1867 and other nursing and training institutions, she set impulses in the areas of charity, poor and sick care as well as the care of the wounded. In addition, she was involved in aid, children's and women's associations for the support of the disadvantaged. She was a recipient of the Order of Sidonia and gave her name to the Carola Medal for charity, which was named after her. Numerous places are named after her, especially in Dresden.

== Princess of Vasa 1833–1853 ==
=== Childhood and youth ===
Princess Carola of Vasa was born on 5 August 1833 in the Kaiserstöckl, an annex of Schönbrunn Palace in Vienna, as the second child and only daughter of the former crown prince of Sweden and Austrian field marshal Prince Gustav of Vasa and his wife Princess Louise Amelie of Baden. Her only sibling, Prince Louis, was born and died in 1832, so Carola remained the only surviving offspring from her parents' marriage.

Carola did not come from the Vasa dynasty, as her name might suggest. Rather, she owed the suffix to her father, who, as a member of the deposed Swedish House of Holstein-Gottorp, was no longer allowed to call himself a prince of Sweden. Instead, he gave himself the nicknames Vasa and (to further affirm his claim to the throne) Holstein-Gottorp, hence Vasa-Holstein-Gottorp. Consequently, Carola also received this surname.

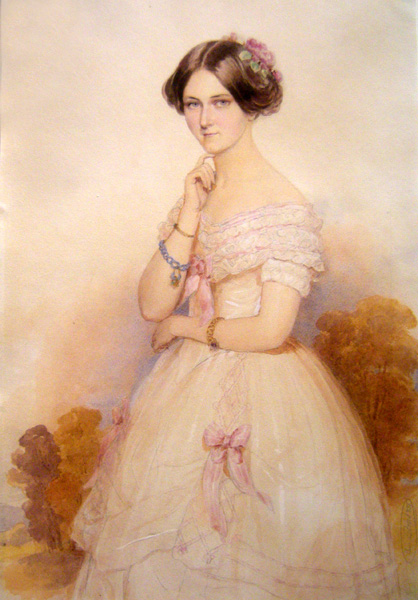
Portrait by Emanuel Thomas Peter, 1850

Carola's evangelical baptism took place on 7 August 1833 at Schönbrunn Palace with the full name of Caroline Friederike Franziska Stephanie Amalie Cäcilie, but her mother called her "Carola". Her godparents were, among other royal representatives, Emperor Francis I of Austria and his third wife Empress Caroline Augusta (born a Princess of Bavaria), Stephanie, Dowager Grand Duchess of Baden (born Beauharnais) and Cecilia, Grand Duchess of Oldenburg (born a Princess of Sweden and Carola's paternal aunt); she received her names after her godparents, her paternal grandmother, Frederica of Baden (former Queen of Sweden) and another paternal aunt, Princess Amalia of Sweden. Until the divorce of her parents in the summer of 1844, Carola spent most of her childhood in the couple's summer residence in South Moravia, Veveří Castle. The princess, who was considered shy and reserved, was raised and instructed in a strict manner, but marked by parental love.

After the separation of her parents, Carola and her mother settled in Moravec Castle in August 1846. Amalie von Ungern-Sternberg took over the instruction of the princess: she developed a preference for drawing, painting and chess, but not for making music. Carola enjoyed performing her own plays. Apart from larger gatherings, rural life in Moravec was quiet and tranquil. During this time, the young princess developed great compassion for underprivileged children and the infirm, to whom she donated food and clothing financed by her mother. In doing so, she laid the foundation for her later involvement in the field of charitable care for the poor and sick. The stay was mostly interrupted for spa trips by her mother, who was suffering from asthma and a heart defect, or for visits to her father or relatives in Mannheim or Karlsruhe.

During the First Italian War of Independence in 1848–1849, Carola supported Hungarian wounded by submitting gifts. In the years that followed, her mother's health continued to deteriorate, which made it necessary for her and Carola to have long visits to the spas in Merano, Venice, Bolzano and Baden. In the years leading up to 1851, the now 18-year-old Carola, who was considered the most beautiful princess in Europe at the time, devoted herself intensively to oil painting.

Carola, like her mother, converted to Catholicism in 1852, despite strong opposition from her father. He only gave his consent on the condition that his daughter separated from her mother for a long time in order to take religious instruction with his sister Sophie, Grand Duchess of Baden in Karlsruhe. The princess returned to her mother after graduation and professed her Catholic faith on 4 November of the same year in the parish church in Moravec.

=== Betrothal and marriage ===
In November 1852, in Moravec, Carola and her mother received an unexpected visit from Princes Albert and George of Saxony, who were on a hunting trip. In truth, however, this was only a pretext, since Prince Albert had been looking for a bride since 1850, which had not been successful until then. Firstly, plans were made for a marriage with Amélie of Leuchtenberg (widow of Emperor Pedro I of Brazil), but Albert did not like her; then, other potential candidates were Archduchess Elisabeth Franziska of Austria (widow of Archduke Ferdinand Karl Viktor of Austria-Este) and of course Carola. During the banquet for the princes and other royals, Albert introduced himself to Carola and was struck by her grace and witty conversation. In later notes, Albert described meeting Carola as "love at first sight". A little later, Albert's father, Prince John of Saxony (who wanted his heir to marry someone who shared their religious beliefs), asked Carola's hand for his son in a letter to the princess' mother. Albert had feared that Napoleon III, Emperor of the French, who had also courted Carola, might forestall him. Another proposed suitor for Carola was Prince Friedrich Karl of Prussia. After a second meeting, Carola accepted Albert's proposal on 5 December 1852, and the official engagement was celebrated in the same day. The couple spent that New Year together in Moravec.

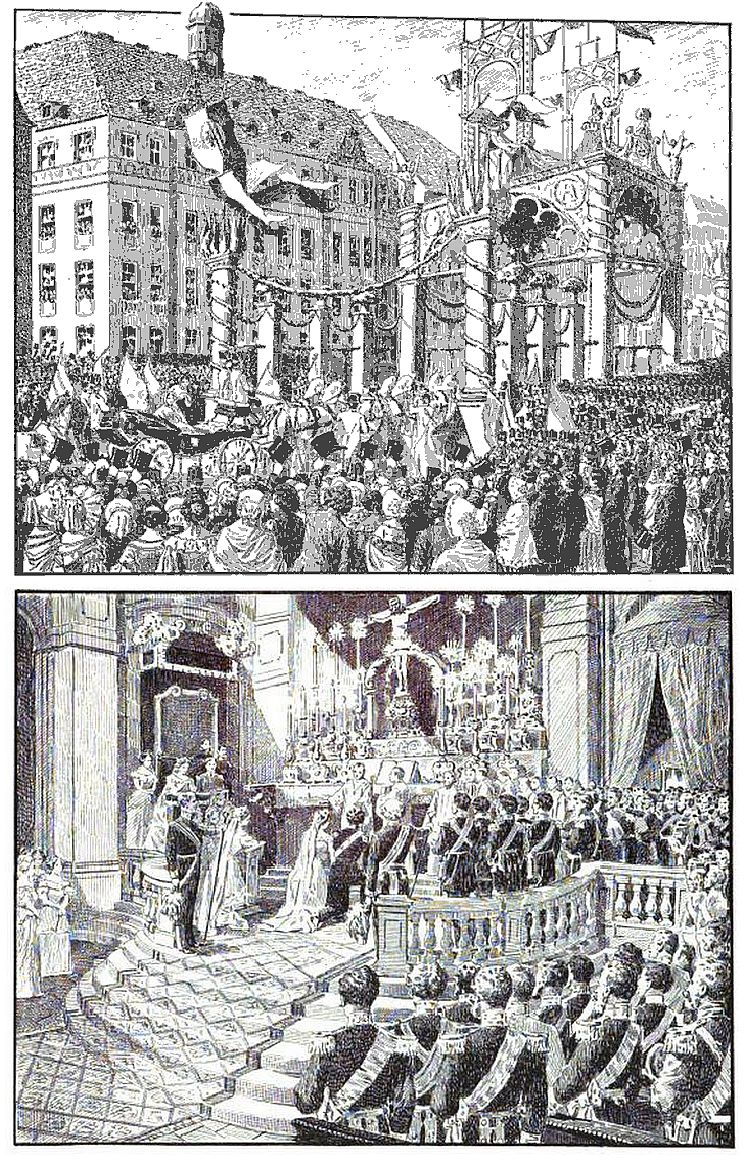
Gate of Honor of the Altstädter Rathaus in Dresden on the occasion of the marriage of Prince Albert and Princess Carola on 18 June 1853, followed by the marriage of the couple in the Dresden Cathedral.

The imminent wedding of Albert and Carola initially met with little approval in Saxony. This was less because of Carola's lack of wealth, and not because of the prevailing bad reputation of her divorced parents. Rather, the reason was that Carola had only converted to the Catholic faith shortly before the engagement. However, Prince John was more concerned about his son's happiness than any animosity towards the bride and did his best to promote the relationship that had developed. He also rejected arguments for or against the wedding for purely financial reasons.

In January 1853, Carola and her mother moved to Brno. There, Albert often visited his fiancée in the coming months. The couple appeared together at balls, theater visits and other festivities, with Carola using the social appearances to prepare for her future position in the Saxon royal family, where the strict Spanish ceremonial applied. Prince John in particular was keen that his future daughter-in-law should demonstrate a high level of confidence in conversation and in the court environment, which Carola fulfilled without hesitation. Meanwhile, her mother's health continued to deteriorate.

For the wedding scheduled for June 1853, Carola traveled from Brno to Prague and from there to Děčín. There she met Albert, with whom she continued in a decorated special train to Pirna, where the couple inspected a troop parade. They arrived with a mounted and horse-drawn escort at Pillnitz Castle, where the Saxon court received the couple and invited them to the family dinner. The procession then traveled on to Dresden, where the wedding took place around noon on 18 June in the Palace in the Great Garden (German: Palais im Großen Garten). After the wedding ceremony, the newlyweds drove in a covered golden gala carriage to the Old Town Hall (German: Altstädter Rathaus), where the Lord Mayor (German: Oberbürgermeister) Wilhelm Pfotenhauergave a reception. Bishop Joseph Dittrich performed the catholic wedding ceremony at Dresden Cathedral. The festivities continued through 2 July. The couple then moved into a spacious apartment in the Taschenbergpalais. Adolf Senfft von Pilsach took over the management of their household. Carola's new Chief Court Mistress (German: Oberhofmeisterin) came from the Werther noble family and instructed her in the court protocol.

== Crown Princess of Saxony 1854–1873 ==
=== Years of peace ===
In March 1854, Carola visited her seriously ill mother in Moravec, who died of lung paralysis on 19 July; twenty-one days later, on 9 August, King Frederick Augustus II of Saxony died after a carriage accident during a trip to Tyrol and Carola's father-in-law became the new king. Her husband, as the eldest son and heir became the crown prince and Carola, as his consort, the crown princess.

The following years were marked by extensive trips lasting several months at home and abroad for the couple, including to Switzerland, Italy and increasingly Austria. In the winter of 1855, Carola took over the protectorate of the Saxon Pestalozzi Association, which supported needy widows and orphans of teachers. In 1859 Carola and Albert moved into the Royal Villa in rural Strehlen. After recovering from measles in November 1860, Carola began to learn to play the piano and devoted herself to painting again. She gave up riding lessons due to increasing myopia.

=== Austro-Prussian War ===
When in the spring of 1866 the war between Prussia and Austria to dissolve the German dualism began to emerge, the Saxon army mobilized its troops on 19 May under the supreme command of Prince Albert. The Kingdom of Saxony was wedged in the most unfavorable way at the interface between the two spheres of interest. As Prussia's demands, e.g. concerning the core question of the future administration of the Duchies of Schleswig and Holstein, had been rejected by the Frankfurt Bundestag, it declared that the German Confederation would resolve the conflict. When Saxony then refused to join a new league to be concluded under Prussia's leadership and reaffirmed its adherence to the German Confederation, Prussia declared war on Saxony on 15 June 1866. In order to protect the kingdom from extensive war damage, the Saxon Army Corps was subordinated to the Austrian Northern Army in Bohemia. Carola and Albert moved into quarters in Prague. Albert commanded his army from there, while Carola increasingly took care of the needs of the wounded who were housed in a hospital on Karlovo náměstí. When Prague itself threatened to become a theater of war, the couple was brought to Regensburg and from there, when news of the defeat of the German Confederation after the Battle of Königgrätz on 3 July arrived, they took refuge in Vienna. In her native town, Carola devoted herself to caring for up to 5,000 wounded soldiers. She organized their food and medical treatment, donated medical equipment and gave comfort and support to the seriously injured, often for several hours a day. In addition, she had books and games distributed and organized the exchange of mail with relatives. When the peace treaty between Prussia and Saxony was signed in Berlin on 21 October, Carola and Albert returned to Dresden in November.

=== New welfare facilities ===
As a losing state in the war, Saxony was pressed into the North German Confederation by Prussia. The royal family of Saxony declared unlimited loyalty to German Emperor William I, who then had his troops withdraw from Dresden by May 1867. In June 1867, Carola and Albert incognito visited the Exposition Universelle in Paris, and were welcomed by Emperor Napoleon III and his wife Empress Eugénie. During the following years there was a political rapprochement between the Saxon and Prussian royal families.

After her return, Carola, shaked by the experience of the war, increased her commitment to the care of the wounded in order to shape the Geneva Conventions that had been negotiated a few years earlier. Therefore, on 14 September 1867, together with Marie Simon, she founded the Albert Association (German: Albertverein), named after her husband, which from 1869 was primarily dedicated to the training of nurses, from which the interdenominational sister community of the Albertines emerged and whose instruction was carried out under the patronage of Carola in the former Gate House (German: Torhäuser) at Leipziger Tor, after their training in the Johannstadt "Carola House" (German: Carolahaus) that served as a mother house, or used in community hospitals. They were also sent to military hospitals in the Russo-Turkish War of 1877–1878.

=== Franco-Prussian War ===
In the summer of 1870, the dispute over the candidacy for the Spanish throne sparked the Franco-Prussian War between the North German Confederation (to which Saxony belonged from 1866) and the Second French Empire. On 16 July, the Crown Prince, as Prussia's ally, mobilized the Saxon troops, who were moved with him to the Rhine front. Carola stayed behind in Dresden and took over the Prinz-Max-Palais from the management of the entire female nursing in Saxony. In addition to the Albert Association, the institutions involved included the International Association for the Care of Sick and Wounded Warriors, the Saxon State Military Association, the Association for Saxon Field Diaconia and the aid associations for the families of conscripted warriors. Her tasks included the allocation of the Albertines and Deaconesses to home or front hospitals as well as the distribution of food, bandages and clothing to the three Dresden hospitals that had been set up. Added to this was the supply of up to 18,000 French prisoners of war in the state capital alone. As in the German War, Carola took over the support of numerous wounded, including in the foreign military hospitals in Leipzig, Wurzen, Großenhain, Zittau, Bautzen and Chemnitz. For this she was ridiculed by the military doctors who were present and occasionally perceived as annoying to obtrusive.

After the victory of the North German Confederation and its allies over France, King John awarded Carola with the Order of Sidonia in recognition of her charitable services during the war on 15 March 1871; in addition, she was appointed as the 499th Dame of the Royal Order of Queen Maria Luisa. Afterwards, Carola accompanied her husband to his military headquarters in Compiègne. In the Château of the same name, they moved into the former imperial apartments. From there, Carola traveled with Albert and held receptions. To help break up the Paris Commune, German troops intervened again in May; Carola traveled back to Dresden. After the restoration of French government, Crown Prince Albert succeeded her in June 1871.

In the winter of 1872–1873, King John's health deteriorated rapidly. He died in Pillnitz on 29 October 1873, whereby the succession to the throne passed his eldest son, who now became King Albert and Carola, as his consort, became Queen of Saxony.

== Queen of Saxony 1873–1902 ==
=== Tenure as consort ===
The funeral ceremonies of King John lasted until January 1874. Having largely been relieved of their foreign policy powers by the previous unification of the empire, the new king and queen devoted themselves in particular to representation at the beginning of the integration of the Kingdom of Saxony into the German Empire. Among the first acts was an extensive tour of inspection of the kingdom, followed by a tour of friendly principalities and abroad.

In 1874, the royal couple moved from the Taschenbergpalais to the Dresden Residenzschloss, where Carola moved into her rooms in the Georgenbau annex. In the same year, Tsar Alexander II of Russia paid his respects to the royal couple. In 1878, Carola and Albert celebrated their silver anniversary. The participation of the Prussian royal family supported the further rapprochement of Saxony and Prussia and at the same time symbolized the further integration of the kingdom into the empire. Primarily, however, such anniversaries served to present the people to their king as the educational and political father of the country, while Carola was portrayed as the caring and comforting mother of the country. On 4 August 1877, Carola's father died at the Riverside Palace (German: Wasserpalais), one of the three main buildings of Pillnitz Castle complex in Dresden, and his residence during the last years of his life. The following decade was marked by a variety of trips and receptions, including visits from the Italian royal family in 1880, King Ferdinand II of Portugal and King Carol I of Romania in 1883, and King Louis I of Portugal in 1886 and King Chulalongkorn of Siam in 1897.

On 29 May 1884, the deposed Swedish branch of the House of Holstein-Gottorp finally made peace with the new Swedish Bernadotte dynasty through Carola and her first cousin once removed the Swedish Crown Princess Victoria (born Princess of Baden), when the remains of Carola's grandfather, King Gustav IV Adolf, her father Prince Gustav of Vasa and her infant brother Prince Louis were taken to Stockholm and interred in the royal crypt at Riddarholmen Church. In 1888, Carola and her husband made an official visit to Sweden.

During her years as Queen of Saxony, Carola gave up political activities and left them to her husband, "compensating for many of his political clumsiness with her affable manner".

In 1898, the royal couple celebrated their 25th anniversary of government. As Albert's health began to decline in his final years, Carola increasingly took on his representational duties and lovingly looked after her husband. He died on 19 June 1902 in Sibyllenort (now Szczodre). He was succeeded by his younger brother Prince George as King of Saxony.

=== Charity ===
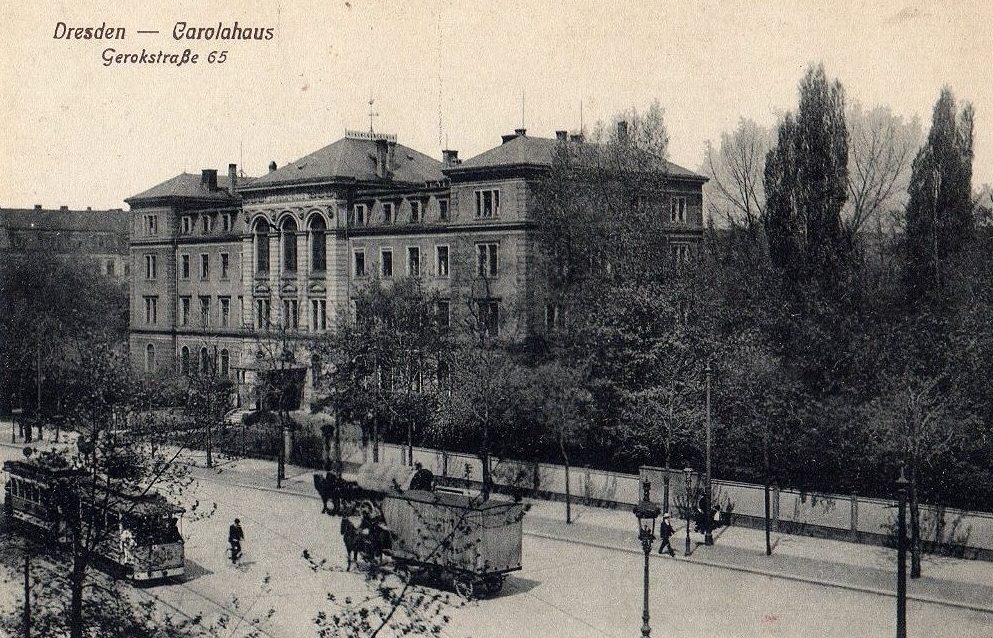
The Carolahous, ca. 1909

With Carola's accession to the throne, Saxon social welfare received important funding impulses. In the residential city of Dresden in particular, the proportion of the working population increased under the impression of growing industrialization and with it at the same time the social needs, which were alleviated by the creation of new welfare institutions. This included the laying of the foundation stone for the "Carola House" in 1876, which was inaugurated two years later. In the same year the Johannes Association (German: Johannes-Verein) was founded, which bundled all four of the Queen's previously founded associations. This included the sewing machine acquisition association in Leubnitz-Neuostra to get women into paid work by buying sewing machines, the Pestalozzi Association for the support and care of needy widows and orphans, the domestic service home for female servants over the age of 60, which provided free housing and covered the costs of treatment in the event of illness, as well as the children's employment association in Dresden Neustadt and Antonstadt. Furthermore, the private Loschwitz Sanatorium (German: Heilstatte Loschwitz) was taken over. Under Carola's direction, the Johannes Association built six houses in Dresden in which 144 poorer families could live. In addition, Carola was responsible for setting up and maintaining pulmonary sanatoriums, which primarily specialized in treating tuberculosis.

In addition, other charities were founded under Carola, including the Dresden Women's Association, which primarily took care of feeding the elderly and sick poor and maintained five children's institutions (German: Kindergarten) and three nurseries (German: Kinderkrippe), and two Catholic charities: the Dresden Association of Saint Elizabeth for the Care of the Poor (German: Verein der Heiligen Elisabeth Dresden zur Armenpflege) and the Vincentius Association for poor relief (German: Vincentiusverein für Armenförderung). Other clubs and institutions were the Gustavheim in Niederpoyritz for the care of the old and infirm, the convalescent station in Pillnitz, the cripple home in Trachenberge, from which today's Dresden Vocational Training Center (German: Berufsbildungswerk Dresden) emerged, which was an educational institution for "crippled" but mentally healthy children, as well as the establishment of three people's kitchens in Dresden Friedrichstadt, in the Leipziger Vorstadt suburb and in Löbtau as well as various soup establishments (German: Suppenanstalten) for children. Outside of Dresden, women's associations were established, including the technical and home economics school in Schwarzenberg, and the Leipzig Carola Association with a technical and trade school for women. Outside of Saxony, a hospital in Dobrodzień, the children's home in Słabowo, was under the Queen's patronage as well as the two Louise Houses (German: Louisenhäuser) in Moravec and Mannheim.

Carola's personal commitment to charity was by no means unusual at the time. Rather, it corresponded to the traditional understanding of the role of noble women and was also the only way for them to work independently and gain a certain social recognition. The systematic development of the social and foundation system in the Kingdom of Saxony and other imperial states opened up completely new public fields of activity for aristocratic and middle-class women. Queen Carola and Empress Augusta Victoria thus rose to become "state mothers" and represented a new generation of women in the field of women's welfare.

The new state also knew how to exploit their work for its own purposes. In the case of Queen Carola, for example, her social commitment was effectively equated with the military duties of her husband Albert in order to generate female participation in the myth of the founding of the empire. At the same time, the state underpinned the concept of a common “people under arms”, which negated the gender differentiation that had previously been practiced.

However, Carola's initiative and her tireless efforts were not only fruitful in social affairs. By training women and girls to become nurses, economists, seamstresses, etc. Occupational branches created new fields of activity for the female sex. With their knowledge of proper household management, the quality of life of the affected families increased. According to Dagmar Vogel, Carola unconsciously contributed to the emancipation and professional independence of women.

=== Personal life ===
Very little is known about the private life of Carola and her husband. Contrary to the forced or political marriage practiced in many royal families, the 49-year marriage between Carola and Albert was one of love. The couple complemented each other harmoniously throughout their lives. The marriage remained childless for unknown reasons. It has been handed down that Carola undertook spa stays and visited healing springs because she was not pregnant, which she continued to do later. In 1881 and 1889 she visited Bad Ems, where she attended the Catholic service every day. Furthermore, Carola could always count on her husband for her charitable projects. The couple celebrated their silver wedding anniversary in 1878. From 1859 onwards, the couple's further private life largely took place in their Strehlen villa, which was the main residence away from the royal court, whereas the castle was only used as a residence when the couple was at court. In later years, the couple also occasionally used the Rehefeld hunting lodge (German: Jagdschloss Rehefeld), a gift from Carola to her husband, or the Sibyllenort Castle. In addition, both Albert and Carola loved traveling and nature trips.

=== Court life ===
Court life was subject to annual regularity. Around the turn of the year, the royal couple sometimes stayed in Dresden Castle to receive New Year's greetings and blessings. This was followed in the first months of the year by the time of the court festivals. The court balls that took place at the same time included up to 900 people, the chamber balls up to 300 people. In April, the royal couple moved to their estate in Strehlen and from June to September to Pillnitz Castle, from where they went on nature and hunting trips to Moritzburg, Bad Schandau or the Tharandt Forest. In the very hot summer months, the royal couple sometimes lived in Rehefeld or later at Sibyllenort Castle (which Albert had inherited from his relative William, Duke of Brunswick in 1884). In October, the couple returned to their villa in Strehlen, where they hosted suppers for high-ranking civil servants, generals and foreign guests well into the winter.

=== Royal household ===
Court and servants of Queen Carola:
Post	Period and name
Chief Court Mistress (Oberhofmeisterin)	1873–1888: Therese von Globig (née von Weißenbach); 1888–1903: Louise von Pflugk (née von Thielau)
Lady-in-waiting (Hofdame)	1873–1875: Anna Gräfin von Waldburg-Zeil-Trauchburg (Note: Under service during her tenure as Crown Princess); 1873–1876: Maria Gräfin von Einsiedel; 1875–1877: Marie von Fabrice; 1876–1878: Hermine Freiin von Palm; 1877–????: Clementine Gräfin von Einsiedel; 1878–1881: Antonie Freiin von Lützerode; 1881–1885: Franziska Gräfin von Strachwitz; 1885–1888 and 1891–1894: Else von Carlowitz; 1888–1890: Eva Freiin von Miltitz; 1895–????: Gabriele Gräfin Reuttner von Weyl
Maid of Honour (Hoffräulein)	1893–????: Ada von Abeken; 1893–????: Marie von Borries; 1893–????: Carola von Nauendorf; 1893–????: Marie von Oppell
Lady of the Chamber (Kammerdienerin)	1873–1874: Marie Schulze (Note: Under service during her tenure as Queen); 1874–1893: Aloisia vom Dziembowska; 1874–????: Marie Cornelia Gruber; 1872–????: Marie Fliegel
Mistress of the Robes (Garderobère)	????–1880: Louise Focke; 1880–1883: Auguste Theile; 1883–????: Josepha Mitzschke; 1897–????: Bertha Kurth
Female assistant (Leibwächterin)	????–1893: Louise Marie Brenne; 1893–????: Therese Auguste Dorn
Bedchamber Lady (Garderobenfrau)	????–1891: Marie Sophie Heinze; 1875–????: Johanna Caroline Roch; 1891–????: Amalie Ernestine Schenke
Chambermaid (Stubenmädchen)	1874–1894: Christiane Marie Emma Schubert; 1894–????: Ernestine Wolffersdorff
Chief Court Master (Oberhofmeister)	1874–1889: Karl von Lüttichau; 1889–1895: Werner von Watzdorf; 1895–????: Theodor von Malortie
Chamberlain (Kammerherr)	1878–????: Hans von Minckwitz
Purse Chamberlain (Kammerzahlmeister)	1874–1877: Ernst Robert Fritzsche; 1877–1880: Ernst Friedrich Eduard Kölitz; 1880–????: Karl Wilhelm Grieshammer
Chamber Office clerk (Kammerzahlamtskanzlist)	1876–????: Arthur Hugo Winkler
Chamber Attendant (Kammerzahlamtsaufwärter)	1877–1878: Jakob Wenzel; 1879–1894: Johann Karl Rämsch; 1894–????: Karl Wilhelm Friedrich
Valet (Kammerdiener)	????–1888: Karl Heinrich Herrmann ????–1877: Ernst Eduard Friedrich Kölitz; 1877–1881: Christian Gottlieb Wilhelm Vogel; 1881–1883: Friedrich August Riedel; 1883–????: Friedrich Emil Wilhelm Hohlfeld; 1888–????: Friedrich August Hentsch
Chamber lackey (Kammerlakai)	1874–1876: Karl August Grellmann; 1874–1891: Traugott Ernst Hattenius; 1877: Christian Gottlieb Wilhelm Vogel; 1877–1885: Karl August Otto Henne ????–1885: Johann Theodor Julius Schäfer ????–1891: Michael Glausch

== Queen Dowager of Saxony 1902–1907 ==
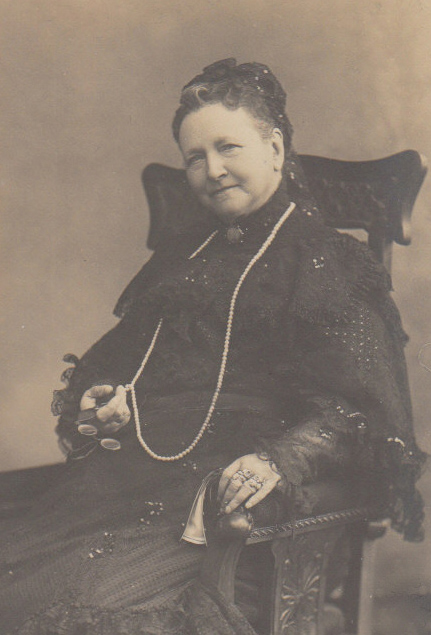
Queen Carola in her final years, ca. 1900

=== Last years ===
After Albert's death, Carola wore mourning ribbon or simple middle-class clothing until the end of her life. She turned down King George's offer to continue living in the Royal Palace. Instead, Carola withdrew to her villa in Strehlen and only appeared in public occasionally. The now visibly aged Queen Dowager, who was considered undemanding by her servants and sometimes stingy, worked for several years on her will, which eventually ran to 140 pages. In it she bequeathed a total of 783,000 marks to individuals and charities. In the last years of her life, according to her servants, Carola prepared for her death. In addition to the noticeable decrease in her strength, she had scattered a large number of framed photographs of deceased relatives on their deathbeds in her bedchamber, intended to remind her of her own impermanence.

=== Death and burial ===
The Dowager Queen had been suffering from diabetes for some time, which later developed into a gradual infection of the bladder and kidneys. A few days before her death, Carola developed chills and a high fever, accompanied by temporary drowsiness that ended in apathy. The attending physician diagnosed a life-threatening functional impairment of the urinary organs, which had led to severe uremia. Carola died at the age of 74 on 15 December 1907 at around 3:30 in the morning in her villa in the presence of the royal family.

After the funeral mass, Carola was publicly laid out in the conservatory of her villa, where thousands bid her farewell. The coffin was then transferred to the Catholic Court Church while all the Dresden bells were ringing, where it was buried the next day in the New Crypt at Dresden Cathedral next to that of her husband. Messages of condolence reached the Saxon court from all parts of Germany, and obituaries and tributes to the late queen appeared in the daily newspapers. The Queen Carola Foundation (German: Königin Carola-Stiftung), founded by the Saxon state parliament in memory of Carola, existed until the end of the World War II.

== Honours ==
In Dresden in particular, the last queen of Saxony was commemorated by naming a large number of places and institutions. These include the Carola-Allee (today Stauffenberg-Allee), dedicated in 1879, the Carola's Bridge (German: Carolabrücke) over the Prießnitz river, another Carolabrücke over the Elbe with the subsequent Carolaplatz and the Carola Lake (German: Carolasee) in the Großer Garten with the Carolaschlösschen restaurant. The 2nd Royal Saxon Hussar Regiment No. 19 received its honorary name after her in 1891. In September 1892, King Albert created the Carola Medal (German: Carola-Medaille), which was awarded for helpful charity. Carola received the Diplome d'honeur and the Diplome de Grand Prix in Brussels in 1897 for her efforts in the education for girls. Also while she was still alive, the Carola Theater in Leipzig in 1887 and the Queen Carola Gymnasium (German: Königin-Carola-Gymnasium) built in 1902 were named after her, as was the cruiser frigate SMS Carola commissioned in 1879 and a bay (the Queen Carola Harbour) on the Buka Island.

In addition, the Carolafelsen (the highest point of the Affensteine is one of the most-visited vantage points in the rear Saxon Switzerland) bears her name, as does the district of Carolathal in the municipality of Breitenbrunn and the Queen Carola mine (German: Königin-Carola-Schacht) in today's Freital. A healing water spring in Tarasp is also named after her. A wounded French soldier whom she cared for during the Franco-Prussian War named a rose variety after her in memory of her, the "Reine Carola de Saxe" (Queen Carola of Saxony). In 1894, the Carola's parotia, a species of the radiated paradise bird genus, was named after her.

In the town of Auerbach was founded a lung sanatorium, named Carolagrün after the Queen.

Today, the figure of Carola, together with other historical personalities, regularly strolls through the baroque garden in the Franconian town of Bad Bocklet, where she stayed in the summer of 1857, as part of the Rondo historica.

== Ancestry ==
Ancestors of Carola of Vasa

8. Gustav III of Sweden
4. Gustav IV Adolf of Sweden
9. Princess Sophia Magdalena of Denmark
2. Gustav, Prince of Vasa
10. Charles Louis, Hereditary Prince of Baden
5. Princess Frederica of Baden
11. Princess Amalie of Hesse-Darmstadt
1. Carola of Vasa
12. Charles Louis, Hereditary Prince of Baden (= 10)
6. Charles, Grand Duke of Baden
13. Princess Amalie of Hesse-Darmstadt (= 11)
3. Princess Louise Amelie of Baden
14. Claude de Beauharnais, comte des Roches-Baritaud
7. Stéphanie de Beauharnais
15. Claudine Françoise de Lézay-Marnézia

== Bibliography ==
- Almanach de Gotha, 1887 und 1901. Gotha: Justus Perthes.
- Delau, Reinhard (2008). Ute Essegern (ed.). Carola von Wasa (1833–1907) (in German). Dresden: Saxo-Phon. pp. 138–147. ISBN 978-3-938325-43-8.
- Fege, Jürgen (2010). "Das soziale Wirken der Königin Carola von Sachsen". Ärzteblatt Sachsen (in German). Berlin: Quintessenz-Verlag.
- Görlitz, Maria (2011). Parlamentarismus in Sachsen. Königtum und Volksvertretung im 19. und frühen 20. Jahrhundert (in German). Münster: LIT Verlag. ISBN 978-3-643-11073-2.
- Herzog zu Sachsen, Johann Georg (1934). "Königin Carola". Neues Archiv für Sächsische Geschichte. (in German). LV. Münster: LIT Verlag: 1–16. online
- Hultman, Harald (1974). Prinsen av Vasa - Den siste Gustavianen (in Swahili). Stockholm: Bonnier. ISBN 978-9-100393-77-9.
- Klein, Eberhard (1908). Carola. Königin-Witwe von Sachsen. Ein kurzes Lebensbild (in German). Freiburg im Breisgau: Charitasverband für das Katholische Deutschland. online
- Marburg, Silke (2008). Europäischer Hochadel. König Johann von Sachsen (1801–1873) und die Binnenkommunikation einer Sozialformation (in German). Berlin: De Gruyter.
- Mergen, Simone (2005). Monarchiejubiläen im 19. Jahrhundert. Die Entdeckung des historischen Jubiläums für den monarchischen Kult in Sachsen und Bayern (in German). Leipzig: Leipziger Universitätsverlag.
- Schimpff, Georg von (1898). Aus dem Leben der Königin Carola von Sachsen: zur fünfundzwanzigjährigen Regierungs-Jubelfeier Seiner Majestät des Königs und Ihrer Majestät der Königin (in German). Leipzig: J.C. Hinrichs. online in Internet Archive and online in SLUB Dresden
- Tuscany, Louisa of (1911). Ex-Crown Princess of Saxony: My Own Story. New York and London: G.P. Putnam's sons. ASIN B002WTND3I.
- Vogel, Dagmar (2006). Wahre Geschichten um Sachsens letzte Königin (in German). Taucha: Tauchaer Verlag. ISBN 978-3-910074-34-7.

Carola of Vasa House of Holstein-Gottorp Cadet branch of the House of Oldenburg Born: 5 August 1833 Died: 15 December 1907
German royalty
Preceded by Amalie Auguste of Bavaria	Queen consort of Saxony; 29 October 1873 – 19 June 1902	None monarchy abolished in 1918
