= Princess Amalia of Sweden =

Swedish princess (1805–1853)

Princess Amalia
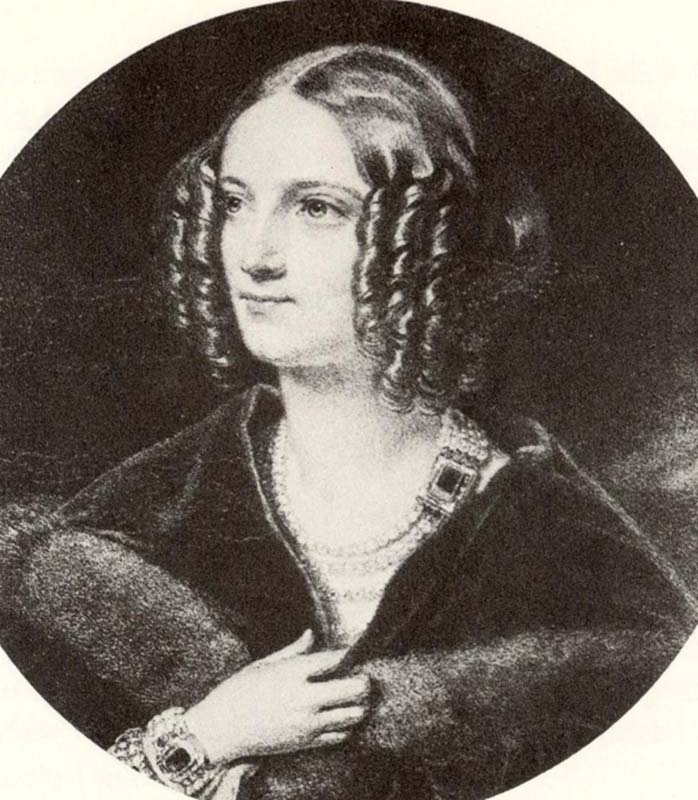
- Princess Amalia Maria Charlotta of Sweden
- Born: 22 February 1805; Stockholm, Sweden
- Died: 31 August 1853 (aged 48); Oldenburg, Grand Duchy of Oldenburg, German Confederation
Names
- Amalia Maria Charlotta
- House: Holstein-Gottorp
- Father: Gustav IV Adolf of Sweden
- Mother: Frederica of Baden

Princess Amalia of Sweden (Amalia Maria Charlotta; 22 February 1805 – 31 August 1853) was a Swedish princess, daughter of King Gustav IV Adolf of Sweden and Frederica of Baden.

== Life ==
Amalia was born in Stockholm and raised under the supervision of the royal governess Charlotte Stierneld. Amalia left Sweden with her family upon her father's deposition after the Coup of 1809 and was raised together with her siblings by their mother and grandmother at Bruchsal Palace in her mother's native country of Baden. As a child she was afflicted with rickets and remained unmarried and childless.

In 1830 she moved to Hacking near Vienna to live with her brother, Prince Gustav of Sweden who had purchased the Hackinger Schlösschen there in 1832. She started going by the name “Amalia von Vasa” and usually socialized with her lady-in-waiting Sophie von Scharnhorst. She was interested in music and was a friend of Jenny Lind.

At the age of 48, she died on 31 August 1853 at 11:30 p.m. in Hacking Castle "as a result of a heart attack." Her body was transported to Oldenburg and buried there in the ducal mausoleum.

== Ancestry ==
Ancestors of Princess Amalia of Sweden

16. Christian August of Holstein-Gottorp, Prince of Eutin
8. Adolf Frederick, King of Sweden
17. Margravine Albertina Frederica of Baden-Durlach
4. Gustav III of Sweden
18. Frederick William I of Prussia
9. Louisa Ulrika of Prussia
19. Sophia Dorothea of Hanover
2. Gustav IV Adolf of Sweden
20. Christian VI of Denmark
10. Frederick V of Denmark
21. Sophie Magdalene of Brandenburg-Kulmbach
5. Sophia Magdalena of Denmark
22. George II of Great Britain
11. Louise of Great Britain
23. Caroline of Ansbach
1. Princess Amalia of Sweden
24. Frederick, Hereditary Prince of Baden-Durlach
12. Charles Frederick, Grand Duke of Baden
25. Princess Amalia of Nassau-Dietz
6. Charles Louis, Hereditary Prince of Baden
26. Louis VIII, Landgrave of Hesse-Darmstadt
13. Landgravine Caroline Louise of Hesse-Darmstadt
27. Countess Charlotte of Hanau-Lichtenberg
3. Frederica of Baden
28. Louis VIII, Landgrave of Hesse-Darmstadt (= 26)
14. Louis IX, Landgrave of Hesse-Darmstadt
29. Countess Charlotte of Hanau-Lichtenberg (= 27)
7. Princess Amalie of Hesse-Darmstadt
30. Christian III, Count Palatine of Zweibrücken
15. Countess Palatine Caroline of Zweibrücken
31. Caroline of Nassau-Saarbrücken
