= List of heirs to the Swedish throne =

This page is a list of heirs to the Swedish throne. The list includes all individuals who were considered to inherit the throne of the Kingdom of Sweden, either as heir apparent or as heir presumptive, since the accession of the House of Holstein-Gottorp on 25 March 1751. Those who succeeded as King of Sweden are shown in bold in the table below.

In 1809 a coup d'état against King Gustav IV replaced him with his uncle Karl XIII. As the new king was childless, he and the ruling government arranged for the adoption of an heir to succeed him.

== House of Holstein-Gottorp (1751–1818) ==
Heirs to the Swedish throne
House of Holstein-Gottorp (1751–1818)
| Monarch | Heir | Relationship to monarch | Became heir (Date; Reason) | Ceased to be heir (Date; Reason) | Next in line of succession |
|---|---|---|---|---|---|
| Adolf Fredrik | **Crown Prince Gustav** | Son | 25 March 1751; Father became king | 12 February 1771; Father died, became king | **Prince Karl**, brother |
| Gustav III | **Prince Karl, Duke of Södermanland** | Brother | 12 February 1771; Brother became king | 1 November 1778; Son born to king | Prince Fredrik Adolf, Duke of Östergötland, brother |
| Gustav III | **Crown Prince Gustav Adolf** | Son | 1 November 1778; Born | 29 March 1792; Father died, became king | **Prince Karl, Duke of Södermanland**, 1778–1782, uncle |
| Gustav III | **Crown Prince Gustav Adolf** | Son | 1 November 1778; Born | 29 March 1792; Father died, became king | Prince Karl Gustav, Duke of Småland, 1782–1783, brother |
| Gustav III | **Crown Prince Gustav Adolf** | Son | 1 November 1778; Born | 29 March 1792; Father died, became king | **Prince Karl, Duke of Södermanland**, 1783–1792, uncle |
| Gustav IV Adolf | **Prince Karl, Duke of Södermanland** | Uncle | 29 March 1792; Nephew became king | 9 November 1799; Son born to king | Prince Fredrik Adolf, Duke of Östergötland, 1792–1798, brother |
| Gustav IV Adolf | **Prince Karl, Duke of Södermanland** | Uncle | 29 March 1792; Nephew became king | 9 November 1799; Son born to king | Prince Karl Adolf, Duke of Värmland, 1798, son |
| Gustav IV Adolf | **Prince Karl, Duke of Södermanland** | Uncle | 29 March 1792; Nephew became king | 9 November 1799; Son born to king | Prince Fredrik Adolf, Duke of Östergötland, 1798–1799, brother |
| Gustav IV Adolf | Crown Prince Gustav | Son | 9 November 1799; Born | 29 March 1809; Father abdicated, excluded from succession | **Prince Karl, Duke of Södermanland**, 1799–1802, granduncle |
| Gustav IV Adolf | Crown Prince Gustav | Son | 9 November 1799; Born | 29 March 1809; Father abdicated, excluded from succession | Prince Karl Gustav, Grand Duke of Finland, 1802–1805, brother |
| Gustav IV Adolf | Crown Prince Gustav | Son | 9 November 1799; Born | 29 March 1809; Father abdicated, excluded from succession | **Prince Karl, Duke of Södermanland**, 1805–1809, granduncle |
| Karl XIII | None, 1809–1810 | | | | |
| Karl XIII | Crown Prince Karl August | Adopted son | 24 January 1810; Elected as heir | 28 May 1810; Died | None |
| Karl XIII | None, 1810 | | | | |
| Karl XIII | **Crown Prince Karl Johan** | Adopted son | 21 August 1810; Elected as heir | 5 February 1818; Adoptive father died, became king | **Prince Oscar, Duke of Södermanland**, son |

== House of Bernadotte (1818–present) ==
| Heir | Status | Relationship to monarch | Became heir | | Ceased to be heir | | Duration as heir | Next in succession Relation to heir | Monarch | | | | | | |
|---|---|---|---|---|---|---|---|---|---|---|---|---|---|---|---|
| Heir | Status | Relationship to monarch | **Crown Prince Oscar, Duke of Södermanland** | Heir apparent | Son | 5 February 1818 | Duration as heir | Next in succession Relation to heir | Monarch | Father became king | 8 March 1844 | Father died, became king | 26 years, 1 month and 3 days | None; 1818-1826 | Karl XIV Johan |
| Prince Karl, Duke of Skåne; 1826-1844; Son | | | **Crown Prince Oscar, Duke of Södermanland** | Heir apparent | Son | 5 February 1818 | | | | Father became king | 8 March 1844 | Father died, became king | 26 years, 1 month and 3 days | | Karl XIV Johan |
| **Corwn Prince Karl, Duke of Skåne** | Heir apparent | Son | 8 March 1844 | Father became king | 8 July 1859 | Father died, became king | 15 years and 4 months | Prince Gustaf, Duke of Uppland; 1844-1852; Brother | Oscar I | | | | | | |
| **Corwn Prince Karl, Duke of Skåne** | Heir apparent | Son | 8 March 1844 | Father became king | 8 July 1859 | Father died, became king | 15 years and 4 months | Prince Oscar, Duke of Östergötland; 1852; Brother | Oscar I | | | | | | |
| **Corwn Prince Karl, Duke of Skåne** | Heir apparent | Son | 8 March 1844 | Father became king | 8 July 1859 | Father died, became king | 15 years and 4 months | Prince Carl Oscar, Duke of Södermanland; 1852-1854; Son | Oscar I | | | | | | |
| **Corwn Prince Karl, Duke of Skåne** | Heir apparent | Son | 8 March 1844 | Father became king | 8 July 1859 | Father died, became king | 15 years and 4 months | Prince Oscar, Duke of Östergötland; 1854-1859; Brother | Oscar I | | | | | | |
| **Prince Oscar, Duke of Östergötland** | Heir presumptive | Brother | 8 July 1859 | Brother became king | 13 September 1872 | Brother died, became king | 13 years, 2 months and 5 days | Prince Gustaf, Duke of Värmland; Son | Karl XV | | | | | | |
| **Crown Prince Gustaf, Duke of Värmland** | Heir apparent | Son | 13 September 1872 | Father became king | 8 December 1907 | Father died, became king | 35 years, 2 months and 25 days | Prince Oscar, Duke of Gotland; 1872–1882; Brother | Oscar II | | | | | | |
| **Crown Prince Gustaf, Duke of Värmland** | Heir apparent | Son | 13 September 1872 | Father became king | 8 December 1907 | Father died, became king | 35 years, 2 months and 25 days | Prince Gustaf Adolf, Duke of Skåne; 1882–1907; Son | Oscar II | | | | | | |
| **Crown Prince Gustaf Adolf, Duke of Skåne** | Heir apparent | Son | 8 December 1907 | Father became king | 29 October 1950 | Father died, became king | 42 years, 10 months and 21 days | Prince Gustaf Adolf, Duke of Västerbotten; 1907–1947; Son | Gustaf V | | | | | | |
| **Crown Prince Gustaf Adolf, Duke of Skåne** | Heir apparent | Son | 8 December 1907 | Father became king | 29 October 1950 | Father died, became king | 42 years, 10 months and 21 days | Prince Carl Gustaf, Duke of Jämtland; 1947–1950; Grandson | Gustaf V | | | | | | |
| **Crown Prince Carl Gustaf, Duke of Jämtland** | Heir apparent | Grandson | 29 October 1950 | Grandfather became king | 15 September 1973 | Grandfather died, became king | 22 years, 10 months and 17 days | Prince Bertil, Duke of Halland; Uncle | Gustaf VI Adolf | | | | | | |
| **Prince Bertil, Duke of Halland** | Heir presumptive | Uncle | 15 September 1973 | Nephew became king | 13 May 1979 | Son born to king | 5 years, 7 months and 28 days | None | Carl XVI Gustaf | | | | | | |
| **Crown Prince Carl Philip, Duke of Värmland** | Heir apparent | Son | 13 May 1979 | Born | 1 January 1980 | Laws of succession changed | 7 months and 19 days | Prince Bertil, Duke of Halland; Granduncle | Carl XVI Gustaf | | | | | | |
| **Crown Princess Victoria, Duchess of Västergötland** | Heiress apparent | Daughter | 1 January 1980 | Laws of succession changed | Incumbent | | 46 years, 4 months and 22 days | Prince Carl Philip, Duke of Värmland; 1980-2012; Brother | Carl XVI Gustaf | | | | | | |
| **Crown Princess Victoria, Duchess of Västergötland** | Heiress apparent | Daughter | 1 January 1980 | Laws of succession changed | Incumbent | | 46 years, 4 months and 22 days | Princess Estelle, Duchess of Östergötland; 2012-present Daughter | Carl XVI Gustaf | | | | | | |

== See also ==
- Duchies in Sweden
- Succession to the Swedish throne
