= Crown Prince Gustav of Sweden =

Crown Prince Gustav of Sweden may refer to:

- Gustavus, Crown Prince of Sweden (1799–1877), eldest son of the deposed Gustav IV Adolf, Crown Prince from north until 1809
- Gustav II Adolf (1594–1632), became king in 1611, also known as Gustav Adolf the Great or Gustavus the Great, Crown Prince from 1606 until accession to throne
- Gustav III of Sweden (1746–1792), became king in 1771, Crown Prince from 1750 until accession to throne
- Gustav IV Adolf of Sweden (1778–1837), king (1792–1809), Crown Prince from birth until accession to throne
- Gustaf V of Sweden (1858–1950), became king in 1907, Crown Prince from 1872 until accession to throne
- Gustaf VI Adolf of Sweden (1882–1973), became king in 1950, Crown Prince from 1907 until accession to throne

== See also ==
- Prince Gustaf Adolf, Duke of Västerbotten (1906–1947), eldest son of Gustav VI Adolf, but died before his father became king
