= Princess Louise Amelie of Baden =

Louise Amelie of Baden
- Princess of Vasa
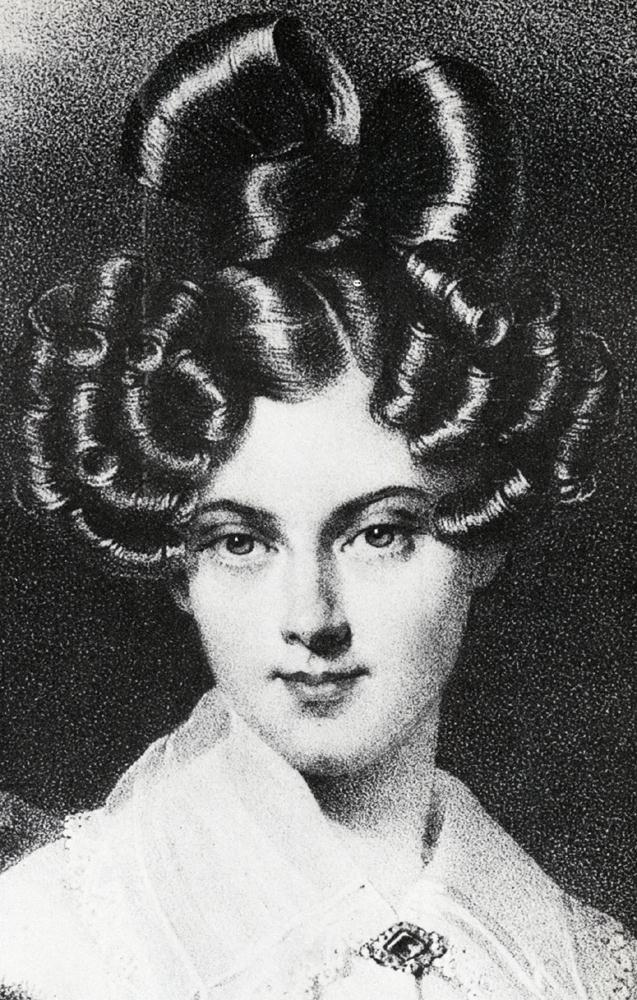
- Born: 5 June 1811; Schwetzingen, Grand Duchy of Baden
- Died: 19 July 1854 (aged 43); Královo Pole, Moravia
- Spouse: Gustav, Prince of Vasa (m. 1830; div. 1843)
- Issue: Prince Louis of Vasa; Carola, Queen of Saxony
Names
- German: Luise Amelie Stephanie
- House: Zähringen
- Father: Charles, Grand Duke of Baden
- Mother: Stéphanie de Beauharnais

Princess Louise Amelie Stephanie of Baden (5 June 1811 – 19 July 1854) was a daughter of Charles, Grand Duke of Baden, and his wife, Stéphanie de Beauharnais, and was a pretender to the title of Queen of Sweden.

== Life ==
=== Childhood ===
Born on 5 June 1811 in Schwetzingen, Louise Amelie Stephanie was the eldest of five children born to Karl, Grand Duke of Baden and Stéphanie de Beauharnais. Louise Amelie had two sisters: Josephine Friederike Luise and Marie Amelie Elisabeth Caroline. Her only brother, whom was unnamed, died in infancy, although it is believed that he was Kaspar Hauser.

Louise Amelie's parents' marriage was unhappy, though they eventually reconciled in an effort to produce heirs to secure the throne.

=== Marriage ===
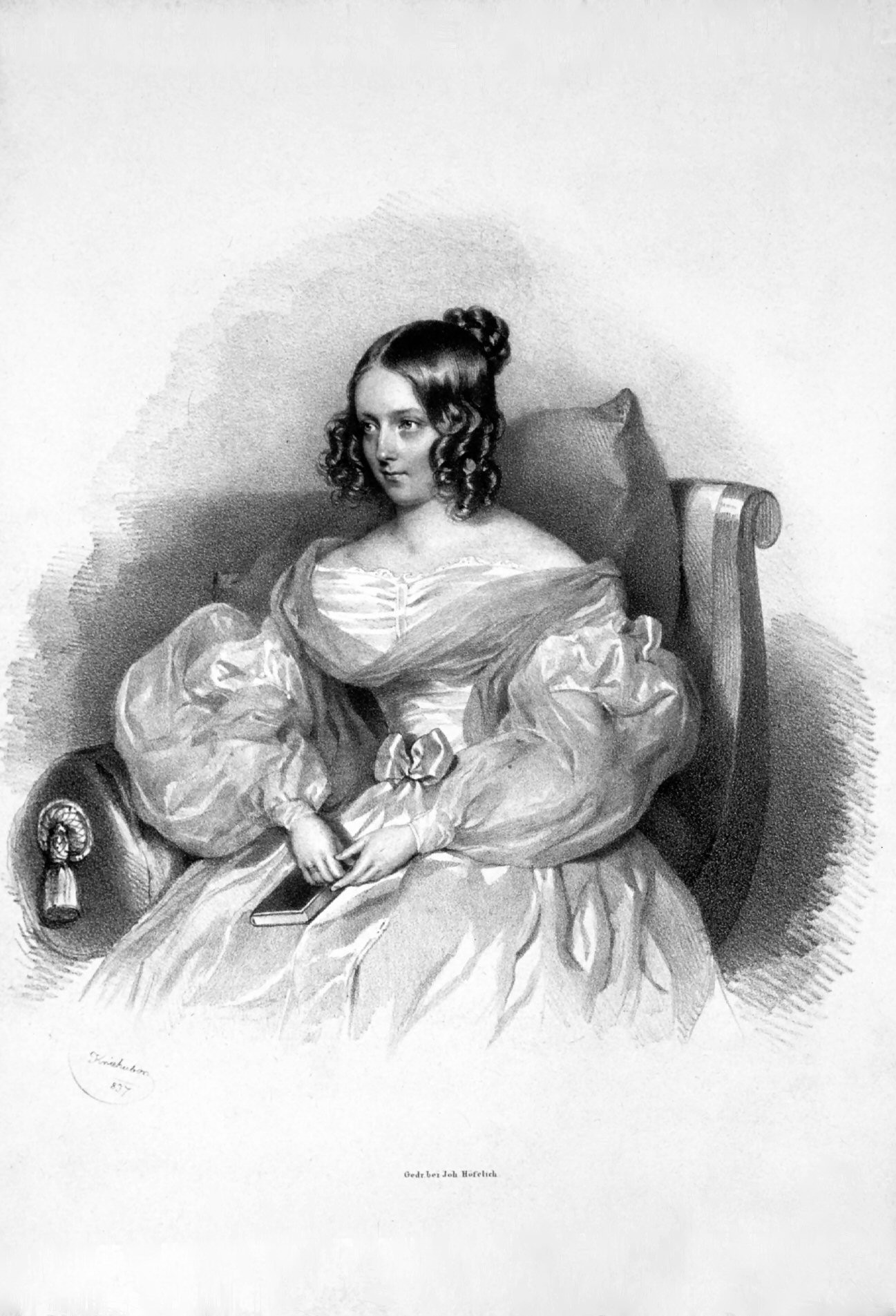
Her potrait, by Josef Kriehuber, 1837.

On 9 November 1830 in Karlsruhe, Louise Amelie married her first cousin Gustav, Prince of Vasa. He was the only son of the former King of Sweden, Gustav IV Adolf, who had been overthrown in favor of his uncle Charles. Upon marriage, Prince Gustav took the title Prince of Vasa, of which made Louise Amelie the Princess of Vasa. However, some believed Prince Gustav to be the legitimate heir to the Swedish throne, henceforth dubbing Louise Amelie as the Crown Princess.

The marriage between Princess Louise Amelie and Prince Gustav was unhappy, but produced two children. Their first child, Louis, was born on 3 March 1832, but died on 7 March. A daughter, named Carola, was born on 5 August 1833. She later became Queen of Saxony. The royal couple lived in Schönbrunn Palace in Vienna until their official divorce in 1843.

Princess Louise Amalie died on 19 July 1854 in Královo Pole.

== Children ==
Name	Birth	Death	Notes
Prince Louis	3 March 1832	7 March 1832	died shortly after birth
Princess Carola	5 August 1833	15 December 1907	married King Albert I of Saxony; no issue

== Ancestry ==
Ancestors of Princess Louise Amelie of Baden

8. Charles Frederick, Grand Duke of Baden
4. Charles Louis, Hereditary Prince of Baden
9. Princess Caroline Louise of Hesse-Darmstadt
2. Charles, Grand Duke of Baden
10. Louis IX, Landgrave of Hesse-Darmstadt
5. Princess Amalie of Hesse-Darmstadt
11. Countess Palatine Caroline of Zweibrücken
1. Princess Louise Amelie of Baden
12. Claude de Beauharnais, comte des Roches-Baritaud
6. Claude de Beauharnais, comte des Roches-Baritaud
13. Marie-Anne-Françoise Mouchard de Chaban
3. Stéphanie de Beauharnais
14. Claude, marquis de Lézay-Marnésia
7. Claudine Françoise de Lézay-Marnésia
15. Marie-Claudine de Nettancourt, dame de Vaubécourt
