= Charles, Grand Duke of Baden =

Grand Duke of Baden from 1811 to 1818

Charles
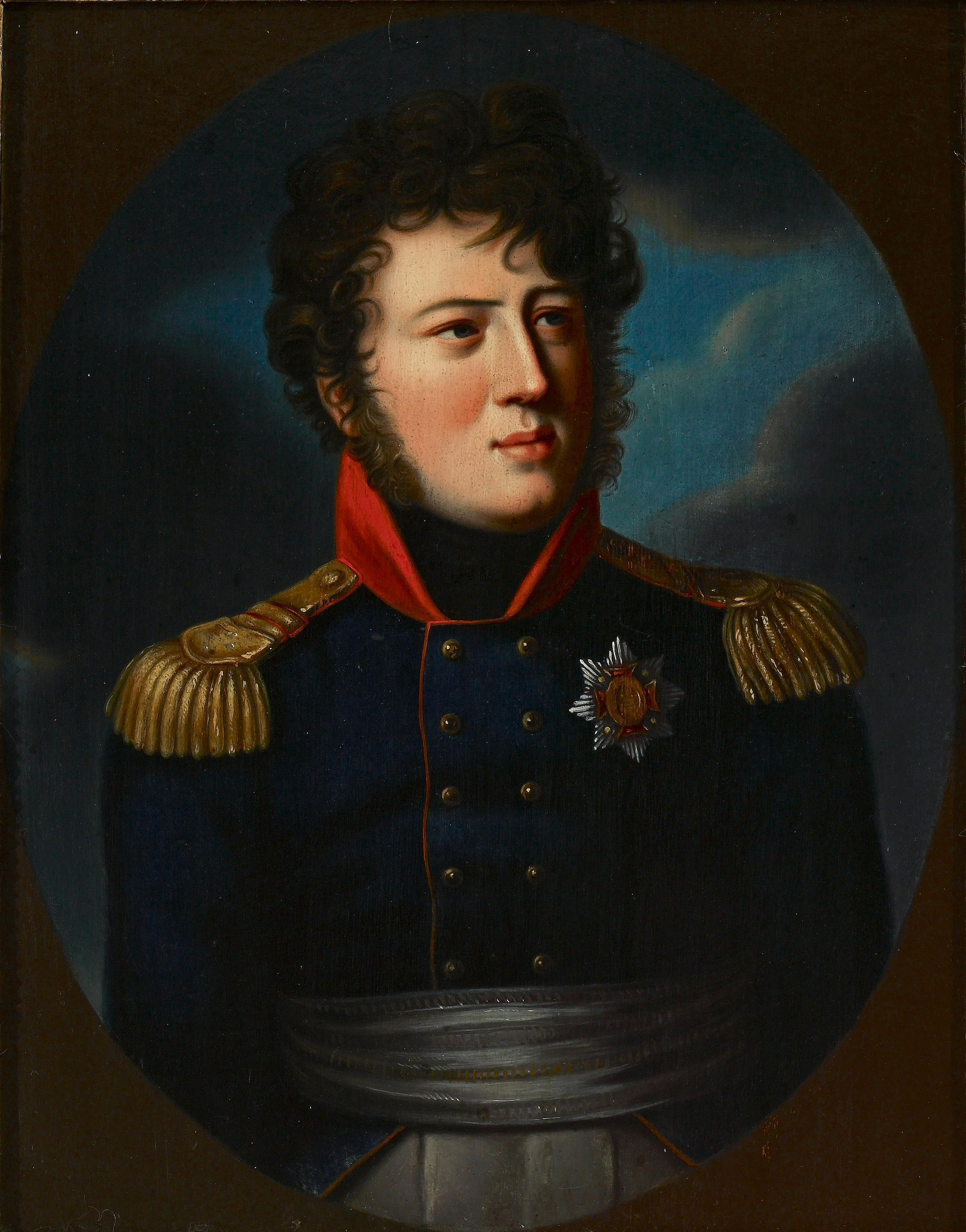
- Portrait by François Gérard, c. 1806

Grand Duke of Baden
- Reign: 10 June 1811 – 8 December 1818
- Predecessor: Charles Frederick
- Successor: Louis I
- Born: 8 June 1786; Karlsruhe
- Died: 8 December 1818 (aged 32); Karlsruhe
- Spouse: Stéphanie de Beauharnais (m. 1806)
- Issue Detail: Louise, Princess of Vasa; Josephine, Princess of Hohenzollern; Alexander, Hereditary Grand Duke of Baden; Princess Marie, Duchess of Hamilton
Names
- German: Karl Ludwig Friedrich
- House: Zähringen
- Father: Charles Louis, Hereditary Prince of Baden
- Mother: Landgravine Amalie of Hesse-Darmstadt
- Religion: Lutheran

Charles (German: Karl Ludwig Friedrich; 8 June 1786 – 8 December 1818) was Grand Duke of Baden from 11 June 1811 until his death in 1818. He was born in Karlsruhe.

== Life ==
Charles of Baden as child, 1793.

His father was Charles Louis, Hereditary Prince of Baden, the heir to the Margraviate of Baden, which was raised to a grand duchy after the dissolution of the Holy Roman Empire in 1806. His mother was Amalie of Hesse-Darmstadt, the daughter of Louis IX, Landgrave of Hesse-Darmstadt. He was the brother-in-law of the rulers of Bavaria, Russia, and Sweden. His sister Caroline was the queen consort of Maximilian I Joseph of Bavaria, his sister Louise was the empress consort of Alexander I of Russia and his sister Frederica was the queen consort of Gustav IV Adolf of Sweden.

At the age of 15, Charles went on a journey to visit his sisters in their courts in St. Petersburg and Stockholm. He was on his way home with his father, when his father died in a fall from his coach on 15 December 1801. Charles was a witness to this accident.

Due to the strong influence of France on the court of Baden, Charles was forced to marry Emperor Napoléon I's adopted daughter, Stéphanie de Beauharnais, in Paris on 8 April 1806, this despite his own protests and those of his mother and sisters. Charles apparently preferred the hand of his cousin Princess Augusta of Bavaria. It would be five years before the couple would produce an heir.

Charles went to war in 1807 as head of the Baden contingent under Marshal Lefebvre. There he took part in the siege of Danzig.

In 1808, Charles returned to the side of his grandfather. His grandfather's age was beginning to show and Charles became co-regent. Charles was 25 years old when he succeeded his grandfather Charles Frederick upon the latter's death on 11 June 1811.

On 4 October 1817, as neither he nor the other sons from his grandfather's first marriage had surviving male descendants, Charles confirmed the succession rights of his half-uncles from the Hochberg morganatic line, granting each the title, Prince and Margrave of Baden, and the style of Highness. He asked the princely congress in Aachen on 20 November 1818, just weeks before his death, to confirm the succession rights of the sons of Louise Caroline, Countess of Hochberg, morganatic second wife of Grand Duke Charles Frederick.

But this proclamation of Baden's succession evoked international challenges. The Congress of Vienna had, in 1815, recognised the eventual claims of Austria and Bavaria to parts of Baden which it allocated to Charles Frederick in the Upper Palatinate and the Breisgau, anticipating that upon his imminent demise those lands would cease to be part of the Grand Duchy. The disputes were resolved by the Treaty of Frankfurt, 1819, under which Baden ceded a portion of Wertheim, already enclaved within Bavaria, to that Kingdom, whereupon the succession as settled in 1817 was recognized by Bavaria and Austria.

== Events that occurred during his reign ==
- The end of Napoleon I's rule and the Congress of Vienna, which confirmed the territorial gains Baden had made during the Napoleonic era.
- 1818: The passing of a new, liberal constitution
- The height of Friedrich Weinbrenner's career
- 1817: The start of the administration of the Rhine by Johann Gottfried Tulla
- The premiere of the velocipede by Karl Drais

== Marriage and family ==
Hereditary Prince Charles married Stéphanie de Beauharnais (28 August 1789 – 29 January 1860), daughter of Claude de Beauharnais and adoptive daughter of Emperor Napoléon I in Paris on 8 April 1806. Their children:

- Princess Louise Amelie of Baden (5 June 1811 – 19 July 1854) she married Gustav of Sweden on 9 November 1830 and they were divorced in 1843. They had two children.
- Prince of Baden (29 September 1812 – 16 October 1812)
- Princess Josephine of Baden (21 October 1813 – 19 June 1900) she married Karl Anton of Hohenzollern-Sigmaringen on 21 October 1834. They had six children
- Hereditary Grand Duke Alexander of Baden (1 May 1816 – 8 May 1816)
- Princess Marie Amelie of Baden (11 October 1817 – 17 October 1888) she married William Hamilton, 11th Duke of Hamilton on 23 February 1843. They had three children.

As Grand Duke Charles did not have any surviving male children, upon his death in Rastatt, he was succeeded by his uncle Louis I. It has been speculated that the foundling Kaspar Hauser was his son, and therefore the actual hereditary prince. Since Kaspar was unmarried and childless when stabbed to death in 1833 his heavily disputed claim reunited with the actual succession then held by Leopold, Grand Duke of Baden, since Louis I also died unmarried and childless three years earlier.

== Ancestry ==
Ancestors of Charles, Grand Duke of Baden

8. Frederick, Hereditary Prince of Baden-Durlach
4. Charles Frederick, Grand Duke of Baden
9. Princess Amalia of Nassau-Dietz
2. Charles Louis, Hereditary Prince of Baden
10. Louis VIII, Landgrave of Hesse-Darmstadt
5. Landgravine Caroline Louise of Hesse-Darmstadt
11. Countess Charlotte of Hanau-Lichtenberg, Heiress of Lichtenberg
1. Charles, Grand Duke of Baden
12. Louis VIII, Landgrave of Hesse-Darmstadt (= 10)
6. Louis IX, Landgrave of Hesse-Darmstadt
13. Countess Charlotte of Hanau-Lichtenberg, Heiress of Lichtenberg (= 11)
3. Landgravine Amalie of Hesse-Darmstadt
14. Christian III, Count Palatine of Zweibrücken
7. Countess Palatine Caroline of Zweibrücken
15. Countess Caroline of Nassau-Saarbrücken

Charles, Grand Duke of Baden House of Zähringen Born: 8 July 1786 Died: 8 December 1818
Regnal titles
Preceded by Charles Frederick	Grand Duke of Baden; 1811–1818	Succeeded by Louis I
