= Louis of Sweden =

Louis of Sweden may refer to:

- Louis (born and died 1583), son of King Charles IX of Sweden
- Louis (born 1832, died shortly after birth), son of Gustav, Prince of Vasa
