= Caroline of Sweden =

Caroline of Sweden - Swedish: Karolina and Charlotta, also Carola - may refer to:

- Charlotte, Queen consort of Sweden 1809
- Carola of Vasa, Swedish princess (claimant) 1833
