= Moravec (Žďár nad Sázavou District) =

- Municipality
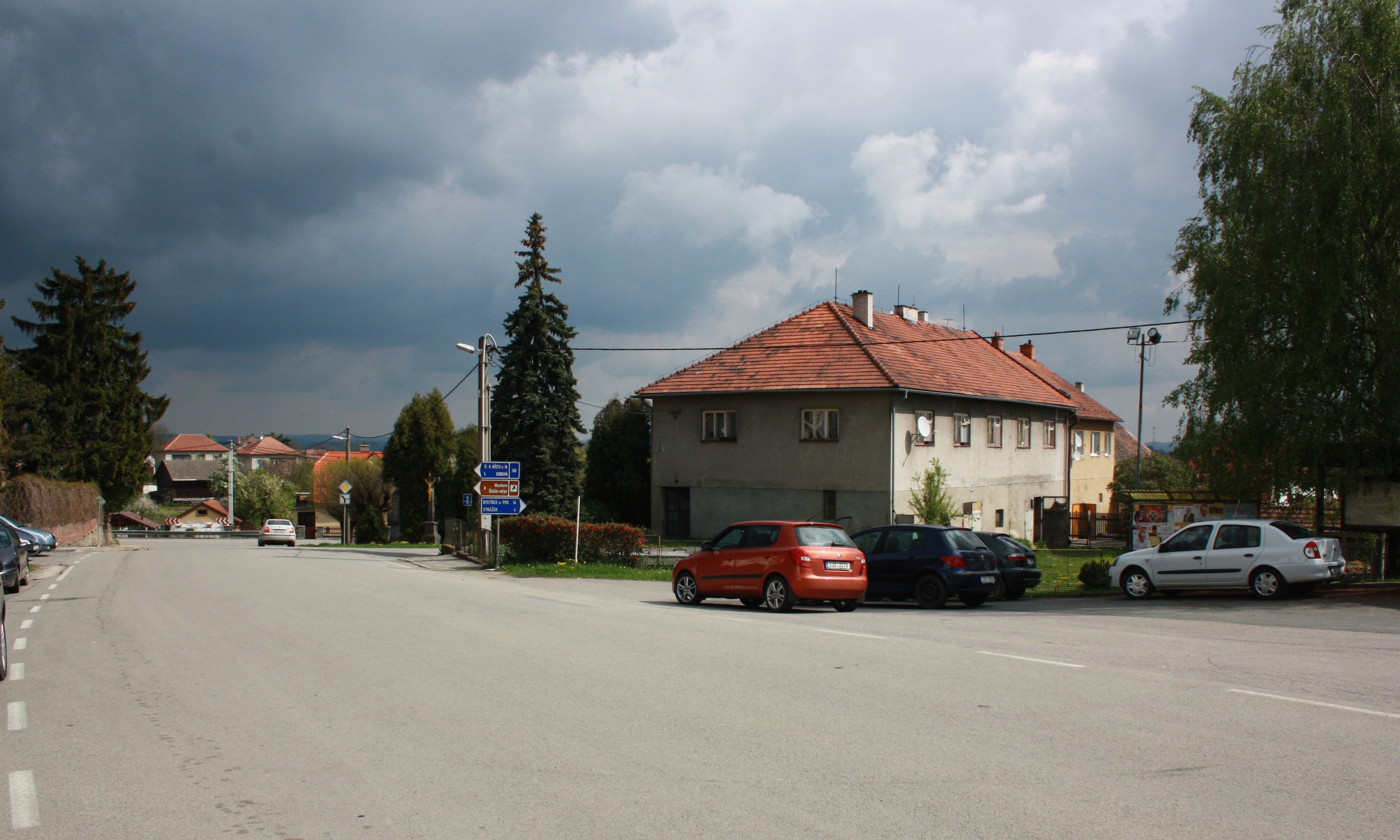
- Main road

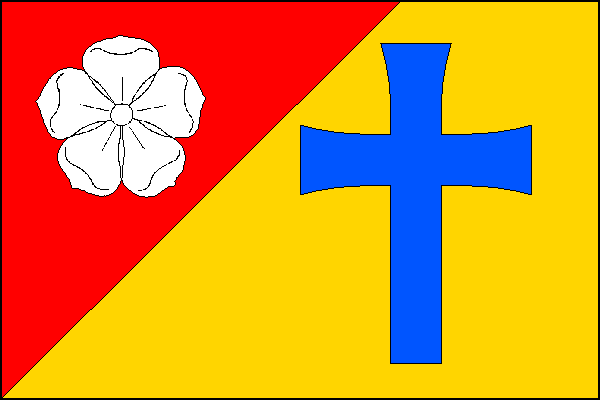
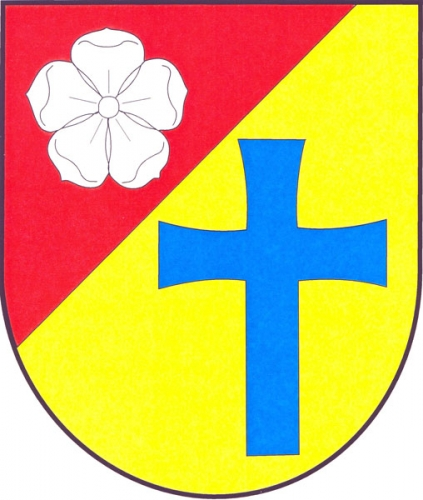
- Flag Coat of arms

- Location in the Czech Republic
- Coordinates: 49°26′25″N 16°8′36″E
- Country: Czech Republic
- Region: Vysočina
- District: Žďár nad Sázavou
- First mentioned: 1374

Area
  - Total: 5.50 km^{2} (2.12 sq mi)
- Elevation: 526 m (1,726 ft)

Population (2026-01-01)
  - Total: 684
  - Density: 124/km^{2} (322/sq mi)
- Time zone: UTC+1 (CET)
  - Summer (DST): UTC+2 (CEST)
- Postal code: 592 54
- Website: www.obec-moravec.cz

Moravec is a municipality and village in Žďár nad Sázavou District in the Vysočina Region of the Czech Republic. It has about 700 inhabitants.

Moravec lies approximately 21 kilometres (13 mi) south-east of Žďár nad Sázavou, 41 kilometres (25 mi) east of Jihlava, and 144 kilometres (89 mi) south-east of Prague.

== Demographics ==
Historical population
Year	Pop.	±%
1869	372	—
1880	387	+4.0%
1890	411	+6.2%
1900	471	+14.6%
1910	501	+6.4%
1921	522	+4.2%
1930	503	−3.6%
1950	480	−4.6%
1961	648	+35.0%
1970	606	−6.5%
1980	597	−1.5%
1991	617	+3.4%
2001	578	−6.3%
2011	602	+4.2%
2021	650	+8.0%
Source: Censuses
