= Stéphanie de Beauharnais =

Grand Duchess of Baden from 1811 to 1818

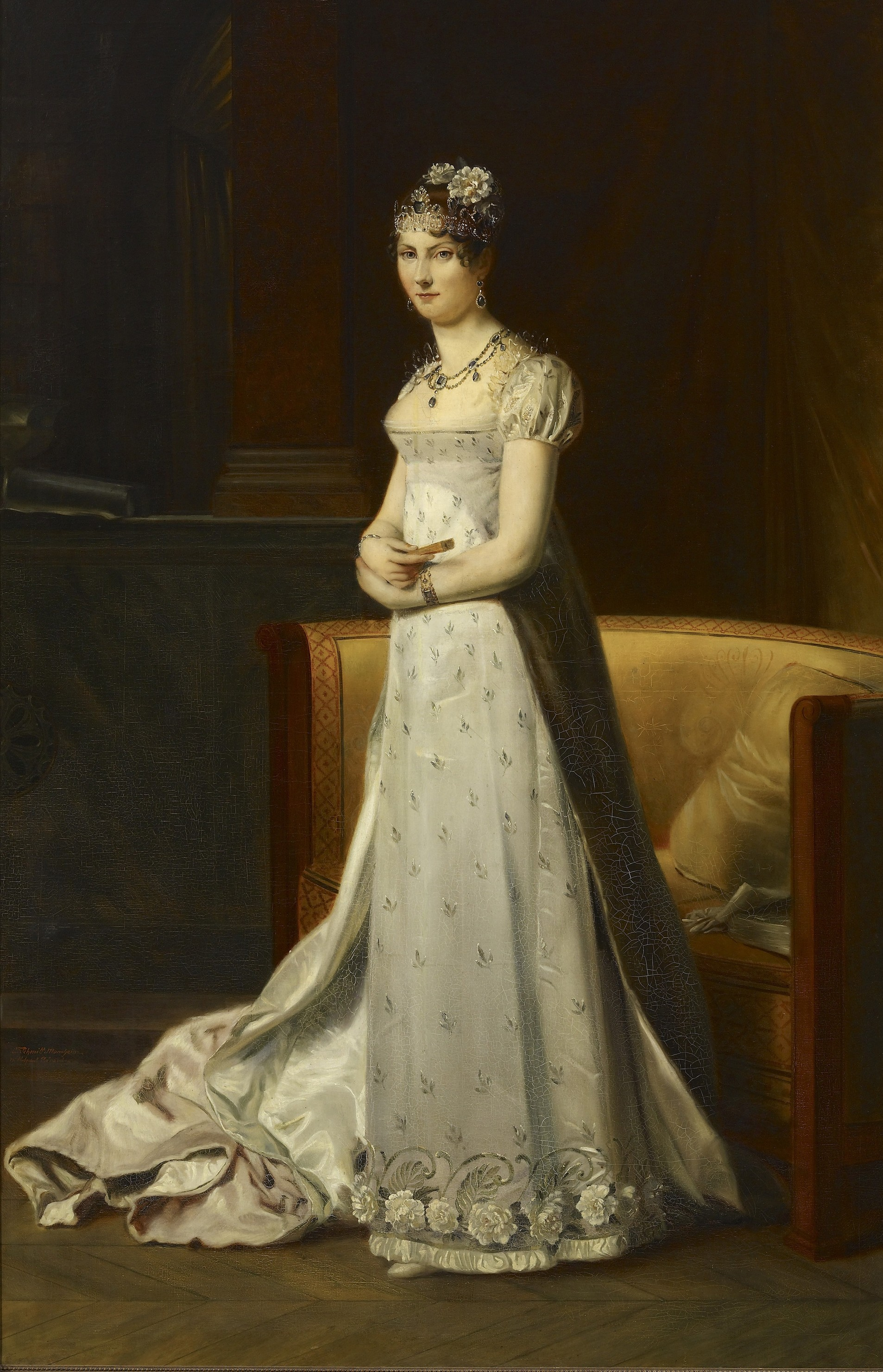
- Portrait by François Gérard

Grand Duchess consort of Baden
- Tenure: 10 June 1811 – 8 December 1818
- Born: 28 August 1789; Versailles, France
- Died: 29 January 1860 (aged 70); Nice, France
- Burial: Pforzheim
- Spouse: Charles, Grand Duke of Baden (m. 1806; died 1818)
- Issue: Luise, Princess of Vasa; Josephine, Princess of Hohenzollern; Prince Alexander; Marie Amelie, Duchess of Hamilton
Names
- Stéphanie Louise Adrienne de Beauharnais
- House: Beauharnais
- Father: Claude, 2nd Count des Roches-Baritaud; Napoleon I (adoptive)
- Mother: Claudine Françoise Adrienne Gabrielle de Lézay-Marnézia

Stéphanie Louise Adrienne de Beauharnais (28 August 1789 – 29 January 1860) was a French princess and the Grand Duchess consort of Baden by marriage to Karl, Grand Duke of Baden.

== Biography ==
=== Early life ===
Born in Versailles at the beginning of the French Revolution, Stéphanie was the daughter of Claude de Beauharnais, 2nd Count des Roches-Baritaud (1756–1819). In 1783 the 2nd Count married Claudine Françoise de Lezay (1767–1791). The marriage resulted in the birth of first her older brother Alberic de Beauharnais (1786–1791) and then Stephanie herself. Her father remarried in 1799 to Suzanne Fortin-Duplessis (1775–1850).

On 13 December 1779 Alexandre, Vicomte de Beauharnais, first cousin of her father, married Joséphine Tascher de la Pagerie. On 23 July 1794, Alexandre was guillotined. Joséphine had affairs with several influential figures of the French Directory, including Paul François Jean Nicolas Barras. The latter would introduce her to his recent favorite Napoléon Bonaparte. Napoléon soon started courting her. On 9 March 1796 they were married.

General Napoléon Bonaparte was now stepfather to Eugène de Beauharnais and Hortense de Beauharnais, second cousins of Stephanie. As his prominence and wealth continued to rise, Napoléon found himself being de facto patron to both the Bonaparte and the de Beauharnais families. Stephanie would soon see her patron rise to become First Consul of France.

=== Princess ===
Her "uncle" crowned himself Emperor of the French on 2 December 1804. As a prominent member of the new Imperial Family, Stephanie held residence in the Tuileries Palace. Her new status allowed her to live a rather luxurious life.

This was a consequence of Napoleon's effort to secure an alliance with the Prince-elector of Baden. The alliance was to be secured through a marriage between the descendants of the two sovereigns, connecting the two dynasties. The Prince-Elector was to be represented by his grandson. Napoleon on the other hand lacked legitimate descendants of his own. He adopted Stephanie and named her "Princesse Française" (French Princess) with the style of Imperial Highness.

=== Grand Duchess of Baden ===
The marriage of Stephanie and Karl (Charles), took place in Paris on 8 April 1806. On 25 July 1806 her new grandfather-in-law was named Karl Friedrich, Grand Duke of Baden.

By most accounts the arranged marriage was not particularly successful. Her husband was determined to continue living as a bachelor. He set residence in Karlsruhe. She was allowed to settle separately in Mannheim. Even the official complaints by Emperor Napoleon did not resolve this situation. The Grand Duke offered Schwetzingen to be their common summer residence. But only Stephanie accepted the offer. The situation changed somewhat when it became evident that the aging Grand Duke would not live much longer. The couple reconciled in an effort to produce heirs for the throne when her spouse succeeded to the throne in 1811.

The Grand Duke died on 8 December 1818. Stephanie remained a widow for the rest of her long life. She was reportedly a devoted mother to her three daughters. Her residence in Mannheim became a popular salon for artists and intellectuals. Stephanie died in Nice, France, at the age of 71, in 1860, 41 years after her husband.

== Children ==
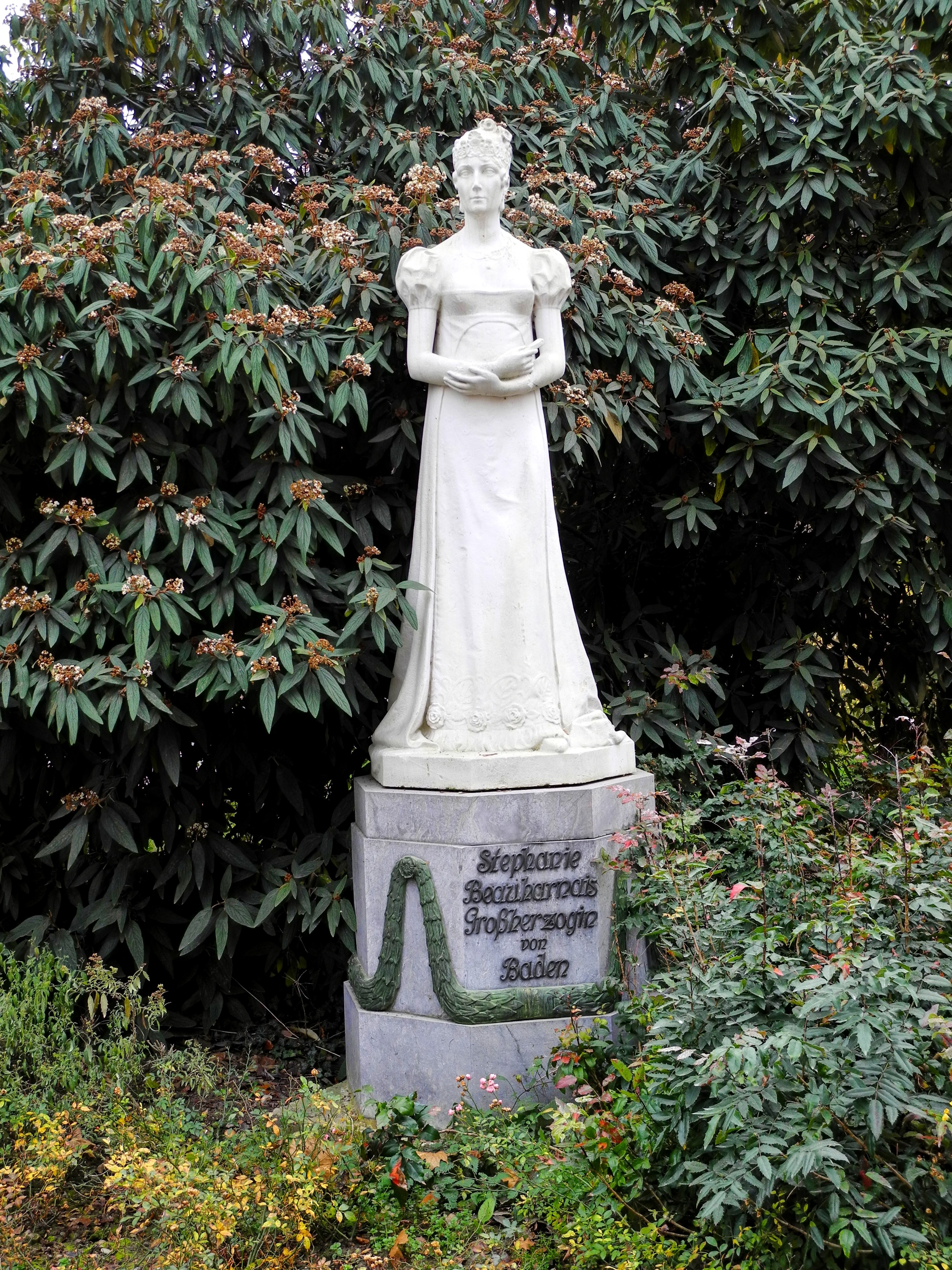
Statue of Stéphanie de Beauharnais near Mannheim Palace

On 10 June 1811, Stephanie's husband, Karl, succeeded his grandfather as Grand Duke of Baden. He and Grand Duchess Stephanie would have five children:

- Princess Luise Amelie Stephanie of Baden (5 June 1811 – 19 July 1854). She was married on 30 November 1830 to Gustav, Prince of Vasa.
- Unnamed son (29 September 1812 – 16 October 1812). (Note: One theory suspects the dead unnamed child to be unrelated to her and her actual son (and therefore the hereditary prince) to be Kaspar Hauser. Although some authors have argued that this was not the case, "the silly fairytale, which to this day moves many pens and has found much belief, was fully disproved in Otto Mittelstädt's book on Kaspar Hauser and his Baden Princedom (Heidelberg 1876)." The idea has remained current in some circles to this day. Since Hauser was unmarried and childless when he was stabbed to death in 1833, his heavily disputed claim reunited with the actual succession then held by Leopold, Grand Duke of Baden, since Karl's uncle and successor Louis I also died unmarried and childless three years earlier.)
- Princess Josephine Friederike Luise of Baden (21 October 1813 – 19 June 1900). She was married on 21 October 1834 to Karl Anton, Fürst of Hohenzollern-Sigmaringen.
- Prince Alexander of Baden (1–8 May 1816).
- Princess Marie Amelie Elisabeth Karoline of Baden (11 October 1817 – 8 October 1888). She was married on 23 February 1843 to William Alexander Anthony Archibald Douglas-Hamilton, 11th Duke of Hamilton.

== Notes ==
Stéphanie de Beauharnais House of Beauharnais Born: 28 August 1789 Died: 29 January 1860
German royalty
Preceded by Landgravine Caroline Louise of Hesse-Darmstadt as Margravine of Baden	Grand Duchess consort of Baden; 10 June 1811 – 8 December 1818	Succeeded by Princess Sophie of Sweden
