= House of Holstein-Gottorp (Swedish line) =

Branch of German dynasty

Arms of Holstein-Gottorp (Swedish branch)

The House of Holstein-Gottorp (Swedish: Holstein-Gottorpska ätten), a cadet branch of the ducal house of Holstein-Gottorp (itself a branch of the Oldenburg dynasty), ruled Sweden between 1751 and 1818, and Norway from 1814 to 1818. The Swedish line of the dynasty was established when Adolf Frederick ascended the throne, followed by Gustav III, Gustav IV Adolf, and Charles XIII. Following the loss of Finland to Russia in 1809 and the deposition of Gustav IV Adolf, the dynasty's rule ended with the death of the childless Charles XIII.

== History ==
In 1743, Adolf Frederick of Holstein-Gottorp was elected crown prince of Sweden as a Swedish concession to Russia, a strategy for achieving an acceptable peace after the disastrous war of the same year. He became King of Sweden in 1751.

King Gustav III, Adolf Frederick's eldest son, was enthusiastic that through his great-great-grandmother their dynasty descended from the royal House of Vasa. He expressed wishes that their house be known as Vasa, as the new royal house of Vasa and the continuation of the original. There was no effective way to force this change. Historians have not agreed with Gustav's desires, and the house is always referred to as Holstein-Gottorp.

In 1809, Gustav III's son King Gustav IV Adolf was deposed following the loss of Finland, and the dynasty disappeared from Swedish history with the death of his uncle King Charles XIII in 1818. In 1810, Jean-Baptiste Bernadotte (later King Charles XIV John), a Marshal of France, was elected crown prince and founded the current Swedish dynasty, the House of Bernadotte.

In 1836, Gustav, the son of the deposed Gustav IV Adolf, was created Prince of Wasa by the Emperor of Austria. However, the use of that name ceased when the prince's only surviving child, his daughter Carola, died without children.

The marriage of the future King Gustaf V to Princess Victoria of Baden in 1881 united the ruling House of Bernadotte with a descendant of the House of Holstein-Gottorp since Victoria was a great-granddaughter of the deposed Gustav IV Adolf.

== Kings of Sweden ==
- 1751–1771: Adolf Frederick
- 1771–1792: Gustav III
- 1792–1809: Gustav IV Adolf
- 1809–1818: Charles XIII

== King of Norway ==
- 1814–1818: Charles II

— Royal house — House of Holstein-Gottorp Cadet branch of the House of Oldenburg
Preceded by House of Hesse	Ruling house of the Kingdom of Sweden; 1751–1818	Succeeded by House of Bernadotte
Preceded by House of Oldenburg	Ruling house of the Kingdom of Norway; 1814–1818	Succeeded by House of Bernadotte
