= Charles Louis, Hereditary Prince of Baden =

Charles Louis
- Hereditary Prince of Baden
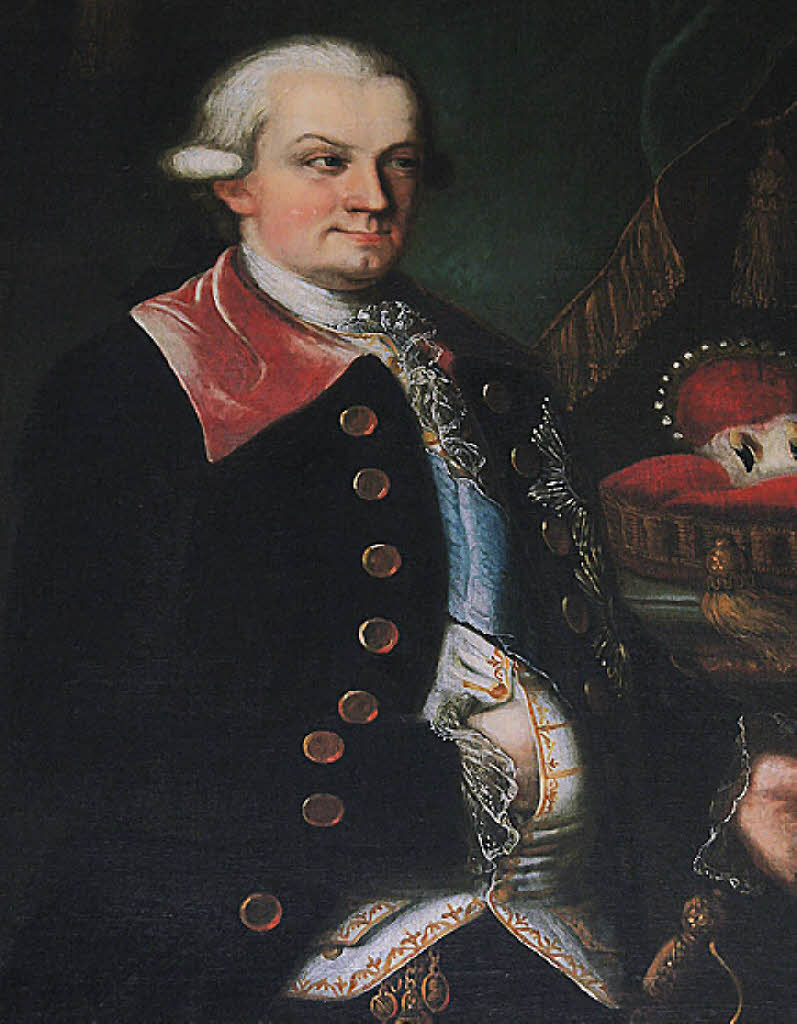
- 1782 portrait
- Born: 14 February 1755; Karlsruhe Palace
- Died: 16 December 1801 (aged 46); Arboga, Sweden
- Burial: Schlosskirche St. Michael, Pforzheim
- Spouse: Princess Amalie of Hesse-Darmstadt (m. 1774)
- Issue: Princess Amalie Christiane; Caroline, Queen of Bavaria; Elizabeth Alexeievna, Empress of Russia; Frederica, Queen of Sweden; Marie, Duchess of Brunswick-Wolfenbüttel; Prince Charles Frederick; Charles, Grand Duke of Baden; Wilhelmine, Grand Duchess of Hesse and by Rhine
Names
- Charles Louis
- House: Zähringen
- Father: Charles Frederick, Margrave of Baden
- Mother: Princess Caroline Louise of Hesse-Darmstadt

Charles Louis, Hereditary Prince of Baden (14 February 1755 – 16 December 1801) was heir apparent of the Margraviate of Baden.

== Early life and family ==
Born in Karlsruhe, he was the son of Margrave Charles Frederick (who in 1803, after Charles Louis's death, became the elector and in 1806 the first Grand Duke of Baden) and Landgravine Caroline Louise of Hesse-Darmstadt, the daughter of Landgrave Louis VIII of Hesse-Darmstadt.

He was an ancestor of Franz Joseph I of Austria, Elisabeth of Austria-Hungary, Nicholas II of Russia and his wife, Alexandra Feodorovna (Alix of Hesse), Lord Mountbatten, Prince Philip, Duke of Edinburgh, and Charles III of the United Kingdom, among others.

== Marriage and issue ==
On 15 July 1774, Charles Louis married his first cousin Landgravine Amalie of Hesse-Darmstadt. She was the daughter of Louis IX, Landgrave of Hesse-Darmstadt.

They had eight children:

- Princess Amalie Christiane of Baden (13 July 1776 – 26 October 1823)
- Princess Caroline of Baden (13 July 1776 – 13 November 1841); married on 9 March 1797 the then Count Palatine Maximilian of Zweibrücken (27 May 1756 – 13 October 1825), as his second wife (and became maternal grandmother of Empress Sisi and her husband, Franz Joseph I of Austria). In 1799, her husband became Elector Palatine and Elector of Bavaria, and, in 1804, King of Bavaria (her titles accordingly being Duchess, then Electress, then Queen).
- Princess Louise of Baden (24 January 1779 – 16 May 1826); married on 9 October 1793 Tsar Alexander I of Russia (23 December 1777 – 1 December 1825).
- Princess Frederica of Baden (12 March 1781 – 25 September 1826); married on 31 October 1797 Gustav IV Adolf of Sweden. They divorced in 1812.
- Princess Marie of Baden (7 September 1782 – 29 April 1808); married on 1 November 1802 Frederick William, Duke of Brunswick (9 October 1771 – 16 June 1815).
- Prince Charles Frederick of Baden (13 September 1784 – 1 March 1785); died prior to succeeding.
- Charles, Grand Duke of Baden (8 June 1786 in Karlsruhe – 8 December 1818 in Rastatt); married on 8 April 1806 Stéphanie de Beauharnais (28 August 1789 – 29 January 1860). Among his descendants are the royal families of Belgium, Romania, Yugoslavia, Luxembourg, Monaco, and two branches of the House of Habsburg-Lothringen.
- Princess Wilhelmine of Baden (10 September 1788 – 27 January 1836); married on 19 June 1804 her first cousin Ludwig II, Grand Duke of Hesse and by Rhine (26 December 1777 – 16 June 1848), and was the mother of Empress Maria Alexandrovna as well as great-grandmother of both Nicholas II of Russia and his wife, Empress Alexandra Feodorovna.

Works of history mention that his children succeeded well in marriage market and that the hereditary prince was the force behind that. His death in Sweden occurred when his carriage bound for Copenhagen via Gothenburg skidded off the icy road and overturned shortly before Arboga (between Kungsör and Arboga close to present-day E20 road), during departure after a visit to his fourth daughter, the Queen of Sweden. Two of his other daughters at the time of his passing were the Electress of Bavaria and the newly ascended Empress of Russia.

== Ancestry ==
Ancestors of Charles Louis, Hereditary Prince of Baden

8. Charles III William, Margrave of Baden-Durlach
4. Frederick, Hereditary Prince of Baden-Durlach
9. Duchess Magdalena Wilhelmine of Württemberg
2. Charles Frederick, Grand Duke of Baden
10. John William Friso, Prince of Orange
5. Princess Amalia of Nassau-Dietz
11. Princess Marie Louise of Hesse-Kassel
1. Charles Louis, Hereditary Prince of Baden
12. Ernest Louis, Landgrave of Hesse-Darmstadt
6. Louis VIII, Landgrave of Hesse-Darmstadt
13. Princess Dorothea Charlotte of Brandenburg-Ansbach
3. Princess Caroline Louise of Hesse-Darmstadt
14. Johann Reinhard III, Count of Hanau-Lichtenberg
7. Countess Charlotte of Hanau-Lichtenberg
15. Princess Dorothea Friederike of Brandenburg-Ansbach
