= Gustav, Prince of Vasa =

Heir to the Swedish throne (1799–1877)

Gustav
- Crown Prince of Sweden; Prince of Vasa
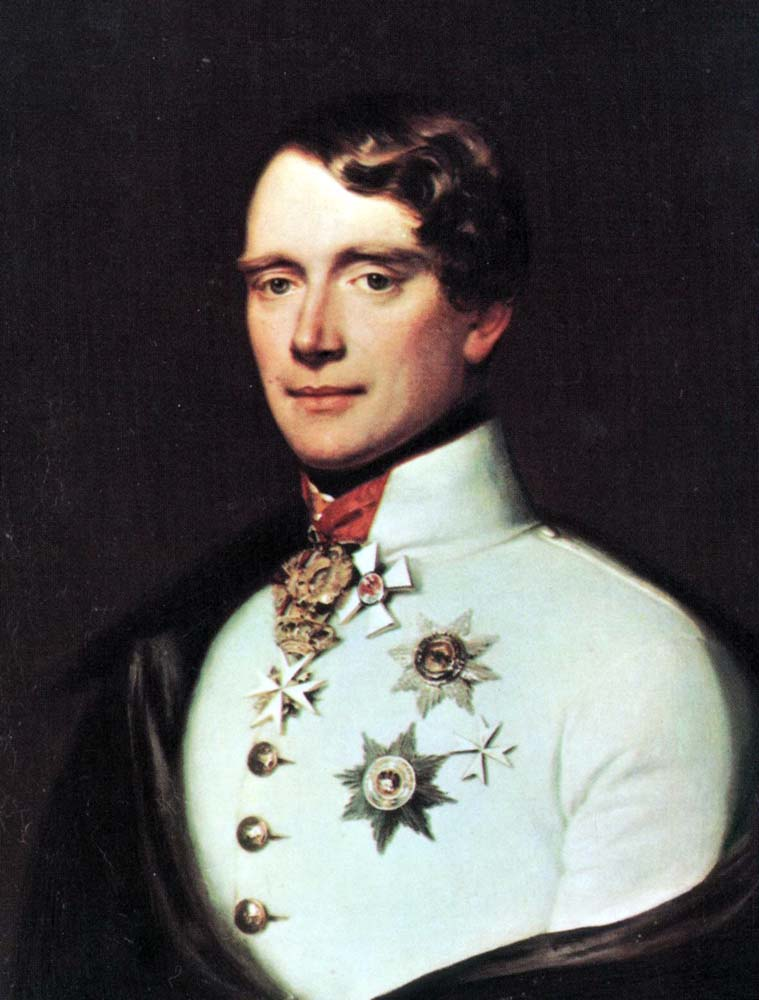
- Portrait c. 1830
- Born: 9 November 1799; Stockholm, Sweden
- Died: 5 August 1877 (aged 77); Pillnitz, Saxony
- Burial: Riddarholmen Church
- Spouse: Princess Louise Amelie of Baden (m. 1830; div. 1843)
- Issue: Prince Louis of Vasa; Carola, Queen of Saxony
- House: Holstein-Gottorp
- Father: Gustav IV Adolf of Sweden
- Mother: Frederica of Baden

Gustav, Prince of Vasa (German: Gustav, Prinz von Wasa; 9 November 1799 – 4 August/5 August 1877), born Crown Prince of Sweden, was the son of King Gustav IV Adolf of Sweden and Queen Frederica. His Austrian princely title (from 1829) was actually spelled Wasa.

== Life and career ==
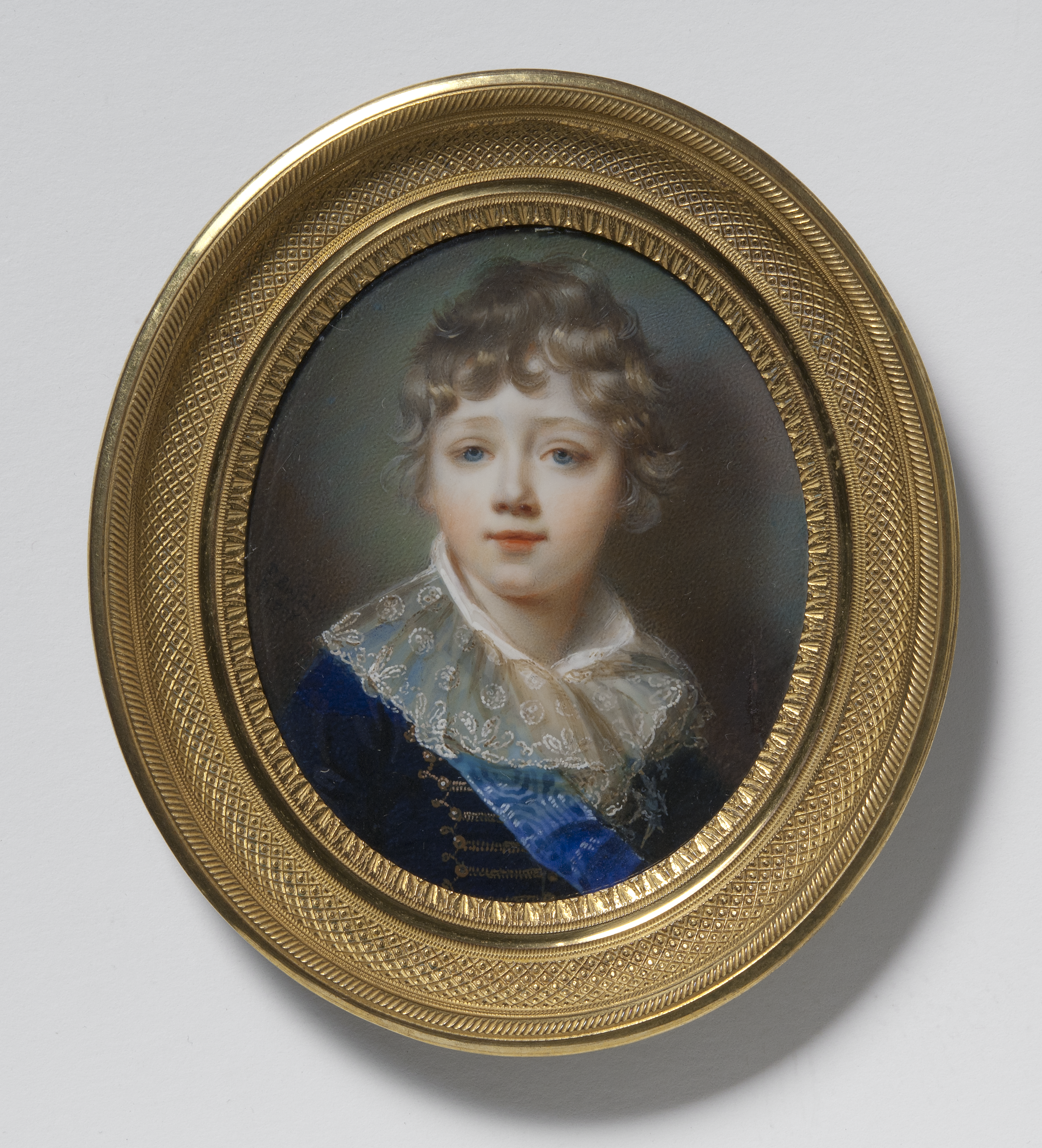
Portrait of Gustav as a boy by Johann Dominik Bossi, 1808

After his birth at Stockholm, he was raised under the supervision of the royal governesses Hedvig Ulrika De la Gardie and Charlotte Stierneld in succession.

When he was ten years old, his father was deposed by the Coup of 1809 and the family was forced into exile. The Gustavian party tried to get him accepted as crown prince in 1809 and 1810, but were unsuccessful. Queen Charlotte, wife of the new king, was one of the leading figures of the Gustavian Party, and often visited ex-queen Frederica in her house arrest and worked for prince Gustav to be acknowledged as heir to the throne. She wrote of this issue in her diaries: during a dinner, General Georg Adlersparre told her that Jean Baptiste Bernadotte had asked whether she had any issue, and was interested when he found she had not. She said that the throne already had an heir in the deposed King's son. Adlersparre became upset and expressed the opinion of his party that none of the instigators of the coup would accept this as they feared that the boy would take revenge against them when he became King, and that they would go as far as take up the old rumour that the deposed King was, in fact, illegitimate and the son of Queen Sophia Magdalena and Count Adolf Fredrik Munck af Fulkila to prevent this.

Between the time after the coup and before the royal family left Sweden, they were held under house arrest. During that period, Queen Charlotte described him in her famous diary as an obedient and dutiful child with a great ability to learn. He was not haughty as his younger sister Princess Sophie, but humble. Rather, he seemed too quiet and too careful for his age. When Princess Sophie asked him why their father was no longer King, he told her that it was best not to talk about it. He asked no questions and did not appear to miss his father. After he was told that his father had been deposed, he acted embarrassed towards his mother. However, when she told him that he too had lost his position as heir, he cried and embraced her without a word. The announcement gave him much relief and happiness.

In 1816, he assumed the title of Count of Itterburg. He served as an officer to the Habsburgs of Austria, and in 1829, Emperor Francis I created him Prince of Vasa (German: Prinz von Wasa-Holstein-Gottorp). During the Greek War of Independence (1821–1829) there was some talk of Gustav becoming its first king, but this never materialized. He was made a Field Marshal-Lieutenant in the Austrian Army in 1836.

== Marriage and issue ==
Potrait of Gustav and his wife whom he later divorced, Louise Amelie of Baden.

In 1828, he became engaged to Princess Marianne of the Netherlands, but political pressure forced an end to any wedding plans. On 9 November 1830, he married in Karlsruhe his first cousin Princess Louise Amelie of Baden (5 June 1811 in Schwetzingen – 19 July 1854 in Karlsruhe). They divorced in 1843. A son, Louis, was born in 1832 but died shortly after birth. Their daughter, Princess Carola, married the Catholic Albert, King of Saxony, but they had no issue.

Gustaf died on 5 August 1877 at Pillnitz. In 1884, his (and his infant son's) remains were moved to Stockholm, to be buried beside his father.

== In popular culture ==
Martin Butzke portrayed Gustav of Vasa in the 2022 Netflix historical drama The Empress.

== Honours ==
=== Awards ===
- Sweden: Knight and Commander of the Order of the Seraphim, 9 November 1799
- Baden:
  - Grand Cross of the House Order of Fidelity, 1811
  - Grand Cross of the Order of the Zähringer Lion, 1815
- Kingdom of Bavaria: Knight of the Order of St. Hubert, 1825
- Belgium: Grand Cordon of the Royal Order of Leopold
- Sovereign Military Order of Malta: Bailiff Grand Cross of Honour and Devotion
- Russian Empire:
  - Knight of the Order of St. Andrew
  - Knight of the Order of St. Alexander Nevsky
  - Knight of the Order of St. Anna, 1st Class
- Grand Duchy of Hesse:
  - Grand Cross of the Ludwig Order, 24 May 1836
  - Grand Cross of the Order of Philip the Magnanimous, 18 June 1850
- Kingdom of Hanover: Grand Cross of the Royal Guelphic Order, 1838
- Kingdom of Saxony: Knight of the Order of the Rue Crown, 1847
- Kingdom of Prussia:
  - Knight of the Order of the Black Eagle, 2 November 1847
  - Knight of the Order of the Red Eagle, 1st Class
  - Grand Commander of the Royal House Order of Hohenzollern
- Brunswick: Grand Cross of the Order of Henry the Lion
- Kingdom of Greece: Grand Cross of the Order of the Redeemer
- Netherlands: Grand Cross of the Order of the Netherlands Lion
- Austria-Hungary: Grand Cross of the Order of St. Stephen, 1875

== Ancestry ==
Ancestors of Gustav, Prince of Vasa

8. Adolf Frederick, King of Sweden
4. Gustav III of Sweden
9. Louisa Ulrika of Prussia
2. Gustav IV Adolf of Sweden
10. Frederick V of Denmark
5. Sophia Magdalena of Denmark
11. Louise of Great Britain
1. Gustav, Prince of Vasa
12. Charles Frederick, Grand Duke of Baden
6. Charles Louis, Hereditary Prince of Baden
13. Landgravine Caroline Louise of Hesse-Darmstadt
3. Frederica of Baden
14. Louis IX, Landgrave of Hesse-Darmstadt
7. Princess Amalie of Hesse-Darmstadt
15. Countess Palatine Caroline of Zweibrücken
