= Princess Caroline Louise of Hesse-Darmstadt =

German artist, naturalist, art collector and entomologist (1723–1783)

Caroline Louise
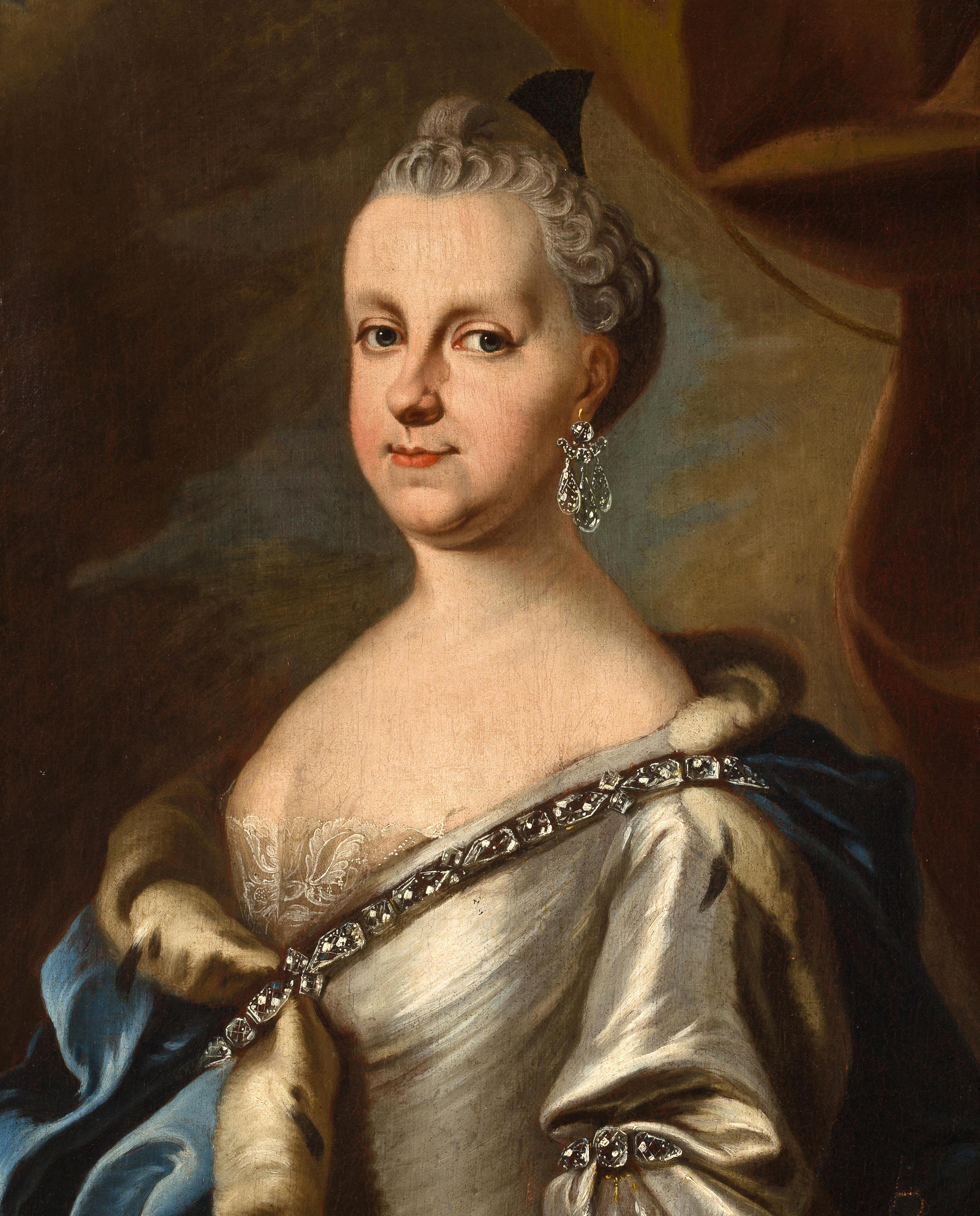
- Caroline Louise in 1767

Margravine consort of Baden
- Tenure: 21 October 1771 – 8 April 1783

Margravine consort of Baden-Durlach
- Tenure: 28 January 1751 – 21 October 1771
- Born: 11 July 1723; Palace of Darmstadt
- Died: 8 April 1783 (aged 59); Paris, France
- Spouse: Charles Frederick, Margrave of Baden (m. 1751)
- Issue among others...: Charles Louis, Hereditary Prince of Baden; Prince Frederick; Louis I, Grand Duke of Baden; Princess Louise Auguste
- House: Hesse-Darmstadt
- Father: Louis VIII, Landgrave of Hesse-Darmstadt
- Mother: Countess Charlotte of Hanau-Lichtenberg

Princess Caroline Louise of Hesse-Darmstadt (11 July 1723 – 8 April 1783), was a consort of Baden, a dilettante artist, scientist, collector and salonist.

== Biography ==
The daughter of Louis VIII of Hesse-Darmstadt and Charlotte Christine Magdalene Johanna of Hanau, she married on January 28, 1751, to Charles Frederick, Margrave of Baden.

She is described as learned, spoke five languages, corresponded with Voltaire and made Karlsruhe to a cultural centre in Germany where she counted Johann Gottfried von Herder, Johann Caspar Lavater, Johann Wolfgang von Goethe, Friedrich Gottlieb Klopstock, Christoph Willibald Gluck and Christoph Martin Wieland among her guests. She was a member of Markgräflich Baden court orchestra and the Danish Academy of Fine Arts, draw, painted in water colours and had a laboratory set up in the Karlsruhe palace. Carl von Linné named Glückskastanie Carolinea Princeps L. after her, and Friedrich Wilhelm von Leysser was hired to gather plants for her. She supported herself and managed a soap- and candle-factory. Her health was ruined by a fall in 1779, and she died by a stroke during a trip with her son.

Her collections were the foundation of the Staatliche Kunsthalle Karlsruhe and the State Museum of Natural History Karlsruhe.

== Issue ==
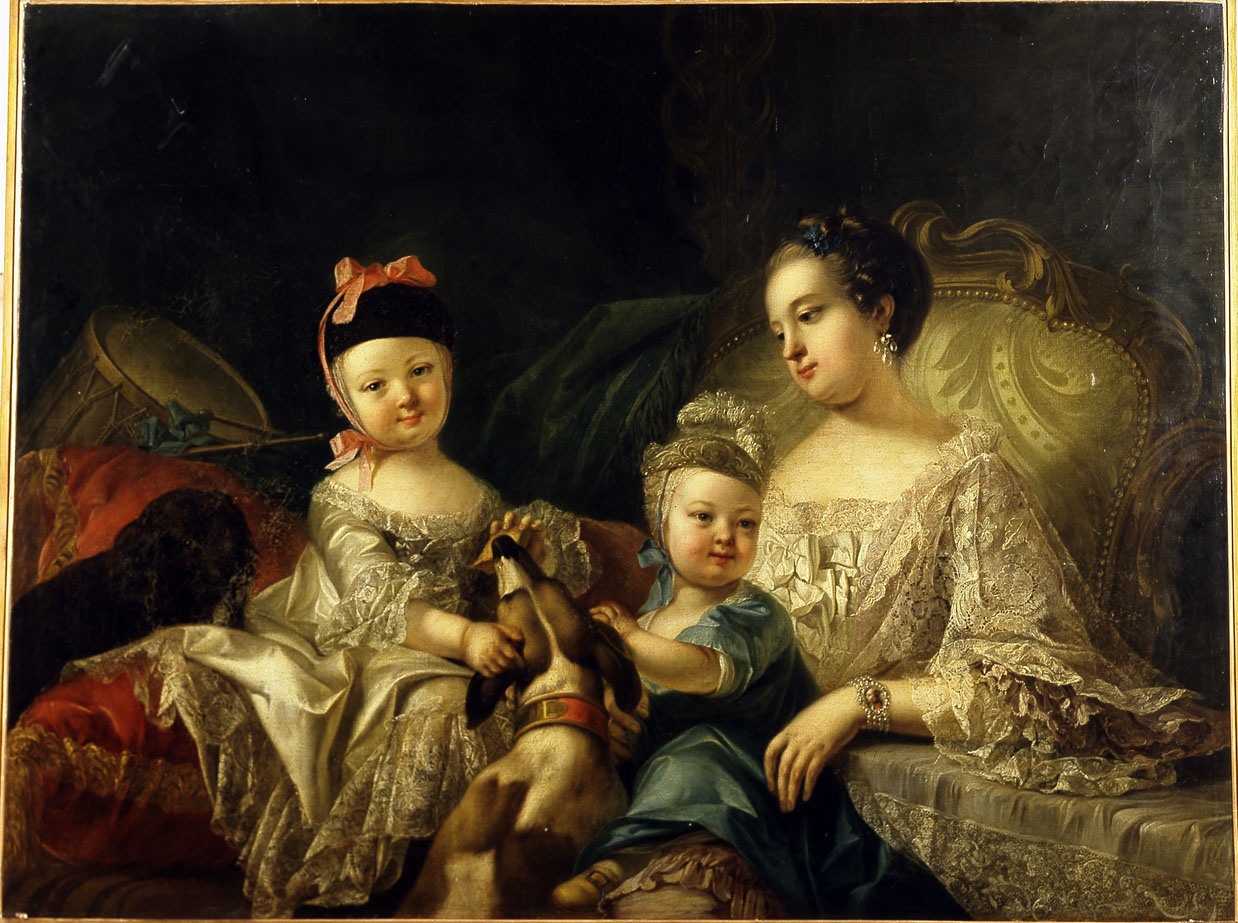
Caroline Louise with her sons Charles Louis and Frederick. Painting by Joseph Melling, 1757.

- Charles Louis, Hereditary Prince of Baden (February 14, 1755 – December 16, 1801). Charles Louis's son, Charles Louis Frederick, succeeded Charles Frederick as Grand Duke upon the latter's death in 1811.
- Frederick (August 29, 1756 – May 28, 1817) married on December 9, 1791, Louise of Nassau-Usingen (August 16, 1776 – February 19, 1829), the daughter of Duke Frederick of Nassau-Usingen
- Louis I, Grand Duke of Baden (February 9, 1763 – March 30, 1830) married Countess Katharina Werner von Langenstein in 1818. Louis succeeded his nephew Charles Louis Frederick as 3rd Grand Duke in 1818.
- Son (July 29, 1764 – July 29, 1764)
- Louise Auguste (January 8, 1767 – January 11, 1767)

== Ancestry ==
Ancestors of Princess Caroline Louise of Hesse-Darmstadt

Louis VI, Landgrave of Hesse-Darmstadt
Ernest Louis, Landgrave of Hesse-Darmstadt
Elisabeth Dorothea of Saxe-Gotha-Altenburg
Louis VIII, Landgrave of Hesse-Darmstadt
Albert V, Margrave of Brandenburg-Ansbach
Dorothea Charlotte of Brandenburg-Ansbach
Countess Sophie Margarete of Oettingen-Oettingen
Landgravine Caroline Louise of Hesse-Darmstadt
Johann Reinhard II of Hanau-Lichtenberg
John Reynard III of Hanau-Lichtenberg
Anna Magdalena, Countess Palatine of Zweibrücken-Birkenfeld
Charlotte Christine Magdalene Johanna of Hanau
John Frederick, Margrave of Brandenburg-Ansbach
Margravine Dorothea Friederike of Brandenburg-Ansbach
Johanna Elisabeth of Baden-Durlach

== Sources ==
Princess Caroline Louise of Hesse-Darmstadt House of Hesse-Darmstadt Cadet branch of the House of Hesse Born: 11 July 1723 Died: 8 April 1783
German royalty
Preceded by Magdalena Wilhelmine of Württemberg	Margavine consort of Baden-Durlach; 1751–1771	Reunification of Baden
Preceded by Herself as Margravine of Baden-Durlach	Margavine consort of Baden; 1771–1783	Vacant Title next held by Stéphanie de Beauharnais as Grand Duchess
Preceded by Marie Victoire d'Arenberg as Margravine of Baden-Baden	Margavine consort of Baden; 1771–1783	Vacant Title next held by Stéphanie de Beauharnais as Grand Duchess
