= Gustav IV Adolf =

King of Sweden from 1792 to 1809

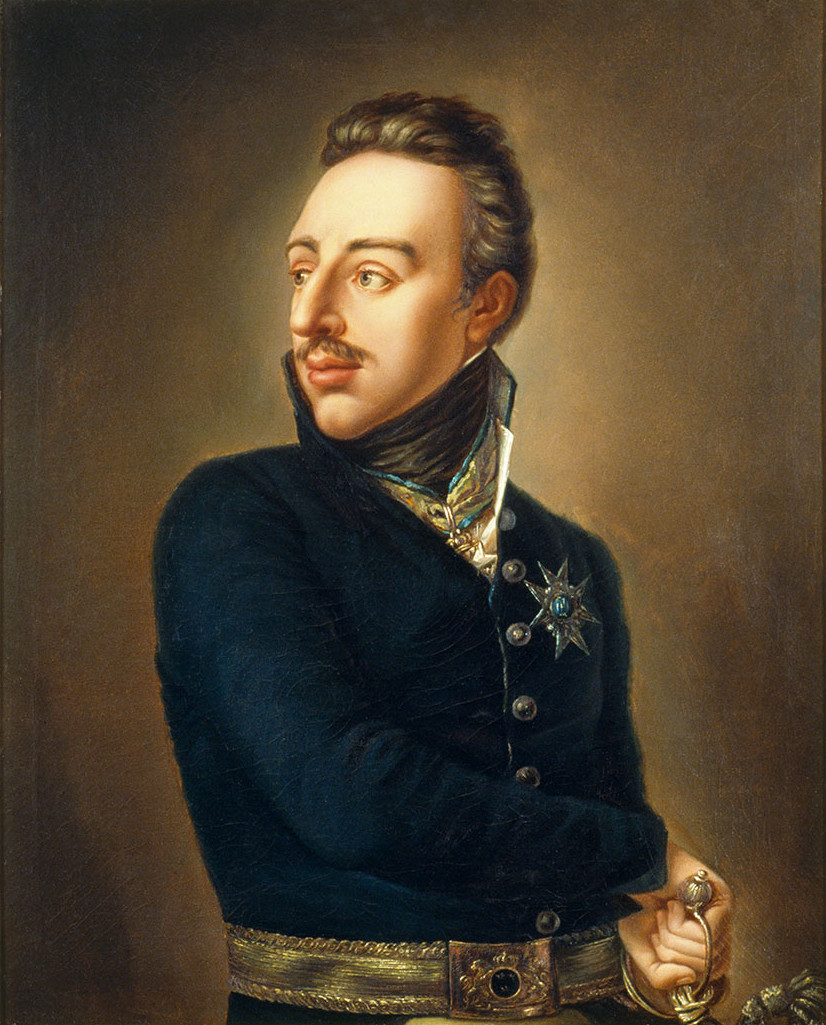
- Portrait by Per Krafft the Younger, 1809

King of Sweden
- Reign: 29 March 1792 – 29 March 1809
- Coronation: 3 April 1800
- Predecessor: Gustav III
- Successor: Charles XIII
- Regent: Charles, Duke of Södermanland (later Charles XIII) (1792–1796)
- Born: 1 November 1778; Stockholm Palace, Stockholm, Sweden
- Died: 7 February 1837 (aged 58); St. Gallen, Swiss Confederacy
- Burial: 29 May 1884; Riddarholm Church, Stockholm
- Spouse: Frederica of Baden (m. 1797; div. 1812)
- Issue: Gustav, Prince of Vasa; Sophie, Grand Duchess of Baden; Princess Amalia; Cecilia, Grand Duchess of Oldenburg
- House: Holstein-Gottorp
- Father: Gustav III
- Mother: Sophia Magdalena of Denmark
- Religion: Lutheran

Gustav IV Adolf or Gustav IV Adolph (1 November 1778 – 7 February 1837) was King of Sweden from 1792 until he was deposed in a coup in 1809. He was also the last Swedish monarch to be the ruler of Finland.

The occupation of Finland in 1808–09 by Russian forces was the immediate cause of Gustav Adolf's overthrow, violently initiated by officers of his own army. Following his abdication on 29 March 1809, an Instrument of Government was hastily written, which severely circumscribed the powers of the monarchy. The "Instrument" was adopted in 1809 on 6 June, the National Day of Sweden now as well as in his time. It remained in force until replaced in 1974. The crown, now with strictly limited powers, passed to Gustav Adolf's uncle Charles XIII.

== Early life ==
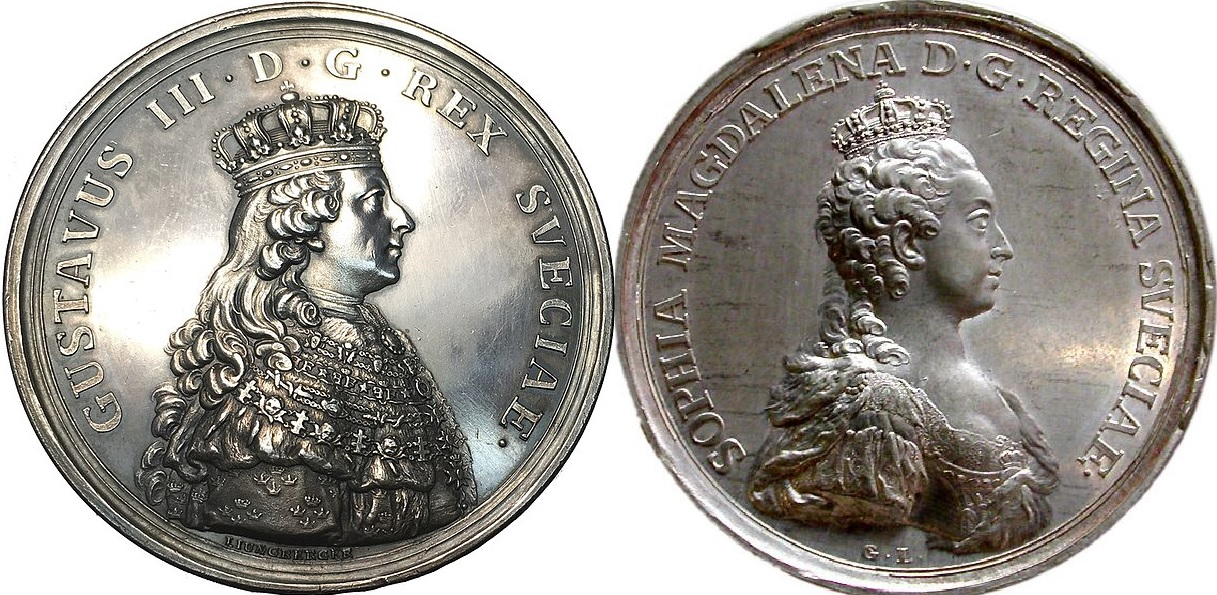
Gustav Adolf's parents, King Gustav III and Queen Sophia Magdalena

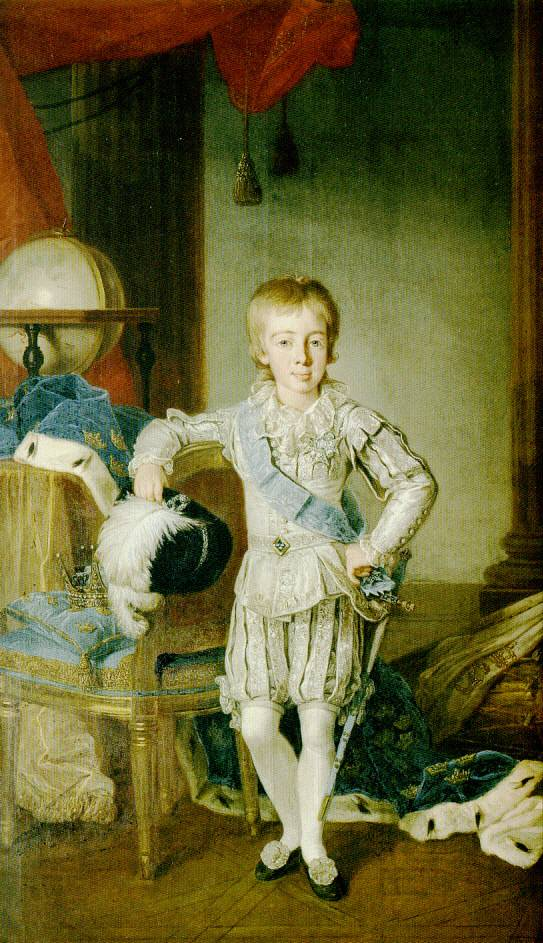
Gustav Adolf at the age of 7.

Gustav Adolf was born in Stockholm on 1 November 1778 as the son of Gustav III and queen Sophia Magdalena. His mother was the eldest daughter of Frederick V of Denmark and Louise of Great Britain.

Gustav Adolf was under the tutelage of Hedvig Sofia von Rosen and her deputies Brita Ebba Celestina von Stauden and Maria Aurora Uggla until the age of 4. He was then raised under the tutelage of his father and the liberal-minded Nils von Rosenstein. Upon Gustav III's assassination in March 1792, Gustav Adolf succeeded to the throne at the age of 13, under the regency of his uncle, Prince Charles, Duke of Södermanland, who was later to become King Charles XIII when his nephew was forced to abdicate and was banished from the country in 1809.

In August 1796, his uncle the regent arranged for the young king to visit Saint Petersburg. The intention was to arrange a marriage between the young king and Grand Duchess Alexandra Pavlovna, a granddaughter of Catherine the Great. However, the whole arrangement foundered on Gustav Adolf's unwavering refusal to allow his intended bride liberty of worship according to the rites of the Russian Orthodox Church. Nobody seems to have suspected the possibility at the time that emotional problems might lie at the root of Gustav Adolf's abnormal piety. On the contrary, when he came of age that year, thereby ending the regency, there were many who prematurely congratulated themselves on the fact that Sweden had now no disturbing genius, but an economical, God-fearing, commonplace monarch.

== Politics ==
Gustav Adolf's prompt dismissal of the generally detested Gustaf Adolf Reuterholm, the duke-regent's leading advisor, added still further to his popularity. On 31 October 1797, Gustav married Friederike Dorothea, granddaughter of Karl Friedrich, Margrave of Baden, a marriage which seemed to threaten war with Russia but for the fanatical hatred of the French republic shared by the Emperor Paul of Russia and Gustav IV Adolf, which served as a bond between them. Indeed, the king's horror of Jacobinism was intense, and drove him to become increasingly committed to the survival of Europe, to the point where he postponed his coronation for some years, so as to avoid calling together a diet. Nonetheless, the disorder of the state finances, largely inherited from Gustav III's war against Russia, as well as widespread crop failures in 1798 and 1799, compelled him to summon the estates to Norrköping in March 1800 and on 3 April the same year. When the king encountered serious opposition at the Riksdag, he resolved never to call another.

== Loss of Finland ==
His reign was ill-fated and was to end abruptly. In 1805, he joined the Third Coalition against Napoleon. His campaign went poorly and the French occupied Swedish Pomerania. When his ally, Russia, made peace and concluded an alliance with France at Tilsit in 1807, Sweden and Portugal were left as Great Britain's only allies on the European continent. On 21 February 1808, Russia invaded Finland, which was ruled by Sweden, on the pretext of compelling Sweden to join Napoleon's Continental System. Denmark likewise declared war on Sweden. In just a few months, almost all of Finland was lost to Russia. As a result of the war, on 17 September 1809, in the Treaty of Fredrikshamn, Sweden surrendered the eastern third of Sweden to Russia. Following which the autonomous Grand Duchy of Finland was established within Imperial Russia.

== Coup d'état and abdication ==
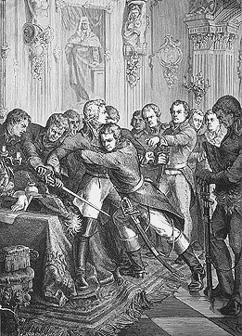
Gustav IV Adolf's arrest

Gustav Adolf was deposed by a conspiracy of army officers.

On 7 March 1809 lieutenant-colonel Georg Adlersparre, commander of a part of the so-called western army stationed in Värmland, triggered the Coup of 1809 by raising the flag of rebellion in Karlstad and starting to march upon Stockholm. To prevent the king from joining loyal troops in Scania, on 13 March 1809 seven of the conspirators led by Carl Johan Adlercreutz broke into the royal apartments in the palace, seized the king, and imprisoned him and his family in Gripsholm Castle; the king's uncle, Duke Charles (Karl), accepted the leadership of a provisional government, which was proclaimed the same day; and a diet, hastily summoned, solemnly approved of the revolution.

On 29 March Gustav IV Adolf, to save the crown for his son, voluntarily abdicated; but on 10 May the Riksdag of the Estates, dominated by the army, declared that not merely Gustav but his whole family had forfeited the throne, perhaps an excuse to exclude his family from succession based on the rumours of his illegitimacy. A more likely cause, however, was that the revolutionaries feared that Gustav Adolf's son, if he inherited the throne, would avenge his father's deposition when he came of age. On 5 June Gustav Adolf's uncle was proclaimed King Charles XIII, after accepting a new liberal constitution, which was ratified by the diet the next day.

Contemporary British newspaper reports mention that in November 1810, he fled Riga aboard an American ship, transited to HMS Ruby, before transferring him to HMS Victory, to be shuttled aboard a sloop and to arrive at Great Yarmouth on 11 November 1810, and disembarked on 14 November. (Note: Yarmouth Nov. 15th. On Monday [11th] last, the Tartarus sloop, Capt. Mainwaring, arrrved here from the Baltic, having on board Gustavus Adolphus, the Ex-King of Sweden, under the title of Count Gottorp.—He made his escape from Riga in an American vessel in such haste that he was accompanied only by a single servant... The King was landed yesterday, under a Royal salute... About four o'clock he set off in the most private manner, in a post-chaise and pair, for London, accompanied by Captain Mainwaring.) He embarked at Yarmouth, and landed at Heligoland on the Baltic Coast on 2 April 1811. (Note: Heligoland, April 2.--This day arrived His Majesty's frigate Horatio, Capt. Lord G. Stuart, after a passage of three days from Yarmouth, having on board the ci-devant King of Sweden (Count Gottorp). He was received with all the respect due to his illustrious character.)

In December, Gustav Adolf and his family were transported to Germany. In 1812, he divorced his wife.

In exile Gustav Adolf used several titles, including Count Gottorp and Duke of Holstein-Eutin, and finally settled at St. Gallen in Switzerland where he lived in a small hotel in great loneliness and indigence, under the name of Colonel Gustafsson. It was there that he suffered a stroke and died on 7 February 1837. He was buried in Moravia. At the suggestion of King Oscar II and Norway, his body was finally brought to Sweden and interred in Riddarholm Church. Gustav Adolf was the great-grandfather of Victoria of Baden, Oscar's new daughter-in-law at the time and eventually Queen of Sweden as consort to Oscar's son Gustaf V.

== Arms ==

Coat of arms of King Gustav IV Adolf

== Ancestry ==
Ancestors of Gustav IV Adolf

8. Christian August of Holstein-Gottorp
4. Adolf Frederick
9. Albertina Frederica of Baden-Durlach
2. Gustav III
10. Frederick William I of Prussia
5. Louisa Ulrika of Prussia
11. Sophia Dorothea of Hanover
1. Gustav IV Adolf
12. Christian VI of Denmark
6. Frederick V of Denmark
13. Sophia Magdalen of Brandenburg-Kulmbach
3. Sophia Magdalena of Denmark
14. George II of Great Britain
7. Louise of Great Britain
15. Caroline of Brandenburg-Ansbach

== Family ==
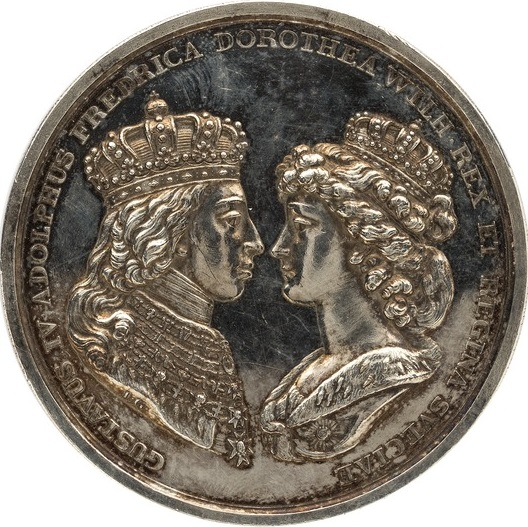
Gustav Adolf's and Frederica's coronation medal of 1800.

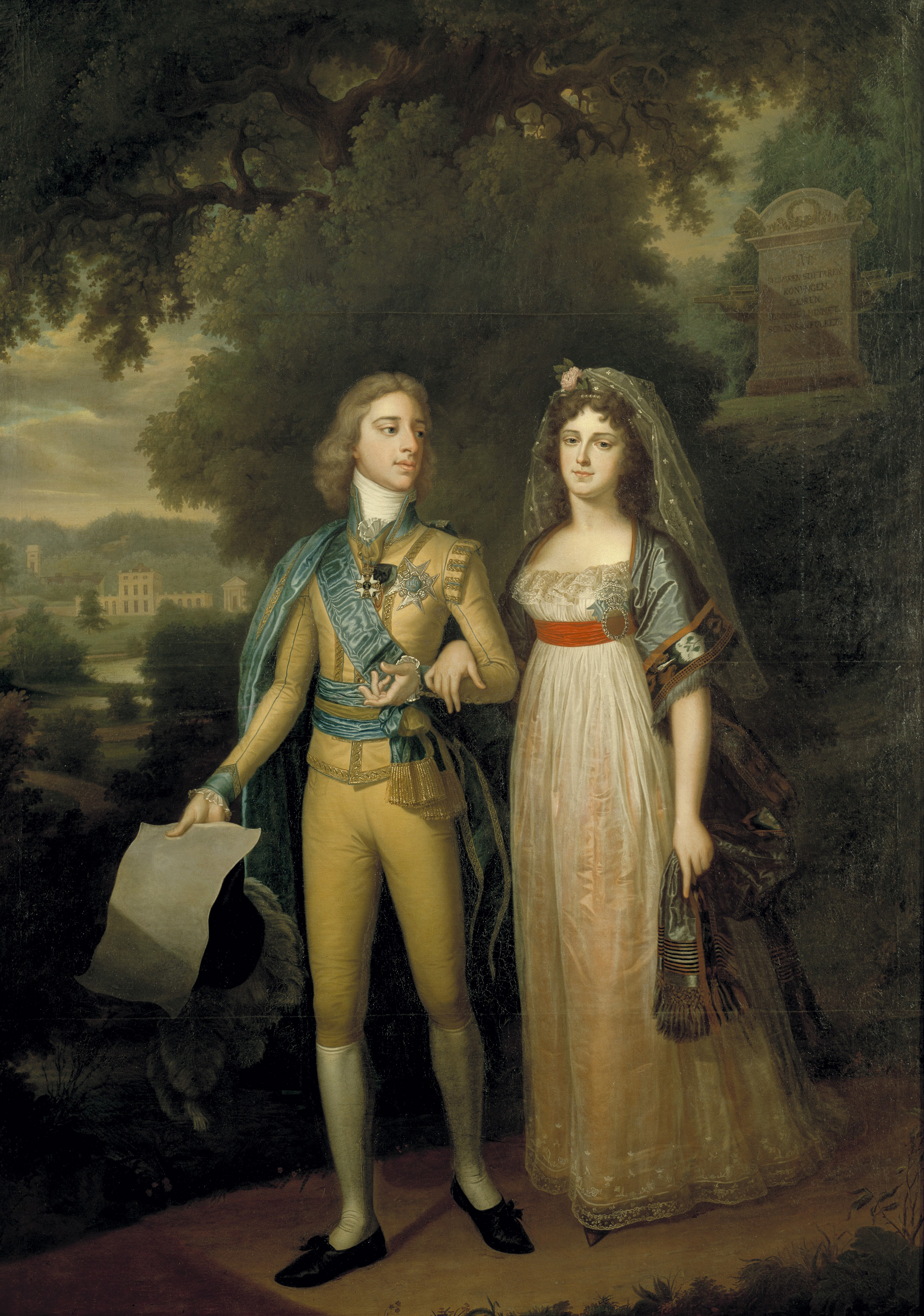
Walking with his wife Queen Frederica.

On 31 October 1797, he married Frederica Dorothea Wilhelmina of Baden, with whom he had five children:

1. Crown Prince Gustav, after 1809 known as Gustaf Gustafsson, Prince of Vasa (9 November 1799 – 4/5 August 1877). He served as an officer in the service of the Habsburgs of Austria, and with his wife Princess Louise Amelie of Baden, fathered a son who died in infancy, and a daughter, Carola, the wife of Albert, King of Saxony. She died childless.
2. Princess Sofia Wilhelmina (21 May 1801 – 6 July 1865). She married Grand Duke Leopold of Baden, and their granddaughter Victoria of Baden married the Bernadotte king Gustaf V. (The present King Carl XVI Gustaf is thus a descendant of Gustav IV Adolf).
3. Prince Carl Gustaf, Grand Duke of Finland (2 December 1802 – 10 September 1805)
4. Princess Amalia (22 February 1805 – 31 August 1853); unmarried and without issue
5. Princess Cecilia (22 June 1807 – 27 January 1844). She married Augustus, Grand Duke of Oldenburg, and had issue.

By 1812, Gustav Adolf divorced his consort, and had several mistresses thereafter, among them Maria Schlegel, who gave him a son, Adolf Gustafsson (1820–1907), styled Count Gustafson, married in 1856 to Ernestine Simon (1823–1911), no children.

== See also ==
- Gustavian era

== Citations ==
Gustav IV Adolf House of Holstein-Gottorp Cadet branch of the House of Oldenburg Born: 1 November 1778 Died: 7 February 1837
Regnal titles
Preceded by Gustav III	King of Sweden; 1792–1809	Vacant Title next held by Charles XIII
