= John Handley =

John Handley may refer to:

- John Handley High School, public high school located in the city of Winchester, Virginia
- John Handley (judge), judge and philanthropist
- John Handley (MP) (1807–1869), Liberal Party politician in England, Member of Parliament 1857–1865
