= Granville Harcourt-Vernon =

Granville Harcourt-Vernon may refer to:

- Granville Harcourt-Vernon (1792–1879), MP
- Granville Harcourt-Vernon (1816–1861), MP, son of the above
