= Finch Hatton =

Finch Hatton may refer to:

- the family of Earl of Winchilsea and Nottingham
  - Harold Heneage Finch-Hatton, English politician and Australian federalist
- Finch Hatton, Queensland, a town in Australia
