= Lord Arthur Clinton =

English aristocrat and politician (1840–1870)

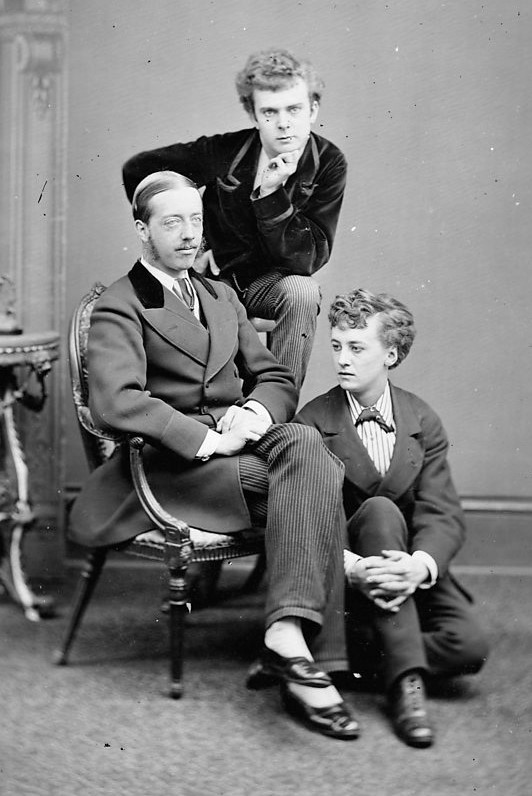
- Arthur Pelham-Clinton (seated), with Ernest Boulton and Frederick Park

Member of Parliament for Newark
- In office 11 July 1865 – 17 November 1868
- Preceded by: John Handley
- Succeeded by: Edward Denison

Personal details
- Born: 23 June 1840 Christchurch, Hampshire, England
- Died: 18 June 1870 (aged 29) Christchurch, Hampshire, England
- Party: Liberal
- Parents: Henry Pelham-Clinton, 5th Duke of Newcastle; Lady Susan Douglas-Hamilton
- Education: Eton College

Military service
- Allegiance: United Kingdom
- Branch/service: Royal Navy
- Years of service: 1854–1870
- Rank: Lieutenant
- Battles/wars: Crimean War; Indian Rebellion of 1857

Lord Arthur Pelham-Clinton (23 June 1840 – 18 June 1870), known as Lord Arthur Clinton, was an English aristocrat and Liberal Party politician. A member of Parliament (MP) for three years, he was notorious for involvement in the Boulton and Park homosexuality scandal and trial.

== Early life ==
Clinton was the son of Henry Pelham-Clinton, 5th Duke of Newcastle, and Lady Susan Harriet Catherine Hamilton. He had three brothers and a sister, Lady Susan Vane-Tempest; she became a mistress of future King Edward VII of the United Kingdom in 1864, when he was the 23 year-old Prince of Wales. His parents divorced in 1850, following the scandal when his mother eloped with her lover, Horatio Walpole, by whom she had an illegitimate son, Horatio. In 1860, his mother married for a second time a Belgian, Jean Alexis Opdebeck. There is some evidence to suggest that Clinton himself was a product of an affair.

Clinton was educated at Woodcote School, Reading, and then Eton College; he entered the Royal Navy in 1854 at the age of 14 and served during the Crimean War in the Baltic Campaign of 1854. He then served in the Naval Brigade during the Indian Mutiny and was present at the siege of Lucknow. He was promoted to Lieutenant in 1861. In 1863, he was appointed to serve on HMS Revenge. On 10 November 1864, his brother Lord Albert was court-martialled on board HMS Victory at Portsmouth. Charges of "desertion and breaking his parole" were upheld by the court and Lord Albert Pelham-Clinton was sentenced to be dismissed from the navy, although The Times reported that the case referred to Lord Arthur in error.

== Member of Parliament ==
Clinton was elected as an MP for Newark at the 1865 United Kingdom general election that July, a seat previously held by his brother Henry Pelham-Clinton, 6th Duke of Newcastle. He was declared bankrupt on 12 November 1868, with debts and liabilities reported to total £70,000, or £6.84 million when adjusted for inflation, and stood down as MP at the subsequent 1868 United Kingdom general election, which took place between 17 November and 7 December. His successor was the philanthropist Edward Denison.

== Homosexuality ==
In 1870, Clinton was living with Ernest Boulton, an established cross-gender actor known to the stage and friends as "Stella". Nominally, Clinton was still a naval officer, although he was placed on the retired Navy List on 1 April 1870.

Boulton and Frederick William Park often appeared in public in female dress. On 28 April 1870, they were arrested and later charged with, but acquitted of, "conspiring and inciting persons to commit an unnatural offence" with Clinton and others.

== Death ==
Clinton officially died on 18 June 1870, the day after receiving his subpoena for testifying in the trial of Boulton and Park. Ostensibly, the cause of death was scarlet fever, but it was more probably suicide. At the time, there was considerable speculation that he had used his powerful connections – he was the godson of Prime Minister William Gladstone – to flee abroad. In his book Fanny and Stella, biographer Neil McKenna cites circumstantial evidence suggesting that Lord Arthur lived on in exile. Boulton and Park were acquitted.

== Criminal impersonation ==
On 8 February 1882, twelve years after Clinton's death, Mary Jane Fearneaux and James Gething were arrested in Birmingham and charged with obtaining £2,000 from one man and £3,000 from another under false pretences. Fearneaux was found to have been living for some years as a man in Birmingham while claiming to be Lord Arthur Clinton, saying that the reported death was a fiction contrived by family and friends to avoid disgrace. She sometimes dressed as a woman while impersonating Clinton, saying that this was a disguise to avoid attention after the notoriety of the Boulton and Park case. At the subsequent trial of the pair, Gething was acquitted and Fearneaux changed her plea to guilty; she was sentenced to seven years in prison.

== See also ==
- Timeline of LGBT history in Britain

Parliament of the United Kingdom
Preceded by John Handley; Grosvenor Hodgkinson	Member of Parliament for Newark; 1865–1868; With: Grosvenor Hodgkinson	Succeeded by Edward Denison; Grosvenor Hodgkinson
