= Newark by-election =

The Newark by-election may refer to:

- 1943 Newark by-election
- 2014 Newark by-election
