= Starkey baronets =

Baronetcy in the Baronetage of the United Kingdom

The Starkey Baronetcy, of Norwood Park in the Parish of Southwell and the County of Nottingham, is a title in the baronetage of the United Kingdom. It was created on 9 July 1935 for John Starkey, who had earlier represented Newark in the House of Commons as a conservative. The second baronet was a lieutenant-colonel in the army and served as High Sheriff of Nottinghamshire in 1954. The third baronet was a deputy lieutenant of Nottinghamshire in 1981 and High Sheriff of Nottinghamshire in 1987.

== Starkey baronets, of Norwood Park (1935) ==
- Sir John Ralph Starkey, 1st Baronet (1859–1940)
- Sir William Randle Starkey, 2nd Baronet (1899–1977)
- Sir John Philip Starkey, 3rd Baronet (b. 1938)

The heir apparent is the present holder's son Henry John Starkey (b. 1973). His heir-in-line is his eldest son Felix Henry Starkey (b. 2004).

== See also ==
- Sir Richard Starkey
