= Thomas Earp =

Thomas Earp may refer to:

- Thomas Earp (politician)
- Thomas Earp (sculptor)
