= John Manners-Sutton (1822–1898) =

British politician

John Henry Manners-Sutton (4 August 1822 – 5 July 1898), was a British Conservative (later Peelite) politician.

== Background ==
A member of the Manners family headed by the Duke of Rutland, Manners Sutton was the son of Reverend Frederick Manners-Sutton, son of John Manners-Sutton. His mother was Lady Henrietta Barbara (1796-1864), daughter of John Lumley, 7th Earl of Scarbrough.

== Political career ==
Manners-Sutton entered Parliament as one of two representatives for Newark in 1847 (succeeded his kinsman Lord John Manners), a seat he held until 1857. He was appointed High Sheriff of Nottinghamshire for 1863.

== Family ==
Manners-Sutton married Mary Jemima, daughter of Reverend Gustavus Burnaby, on 21 April 1853. She was sister of Frederick Gustavus Burnaby. Manners-Sutton died at Kelham, Nottinghamshire, in July 1898, aged 72. His wife died on 17 March 1904, aged 75. Their son John Henry Evelyn Manners-Sutton, born 28 March 1854, a graduate of Trinity College, Cambridge, died unmarried on 8 August 1906. Their daughter, Edith Mary Manners-Sutton, married Robert Heathcote in 1877 and they had a son, and a daughter who married the 28th Earl of Mar: she died on 25 April 1924.

Parliament of the United Kingdom
Preceded by Lord John Manners; John Stuart	Member of Parliament for Newark; 1847–1857; With: John Stuart 1847–1852; Granville Harcourt-Vernon 1852–1857	Succeeded by The Earl of Lincoln; John Handley
Honorary titles
Preceded by John Vere	High Sheriff of Nottinghamshire; 1848	Succeeded by Robert Holden
