= Edward Bishop, Baron Bishopston =

British politician (1920–1984)

The Right Honourable The Lord Bishopston PC

Member of Parliament for Newark
- In office 1964–1979
- Preceded by: George Deer
- Succeeded by: Richard Alexander

Assistant Government Whip
- In office 1966–1967

Minister of State for Agriculture, Fisheries and Food
- In office 1974–1979

Member of the House of Lords
- In office 1981–1984

Personal details
- Born: 3 October 1920 Bristol, United Kingdom
- Died: 19 April 1984 (aged 63) Devon, United Kingdom
- Party: Labour
- Spouse: Winifred
- Children: Anne, Mary, Frances, Ursula
- Education: University of Bristol
- Occupation: Aeronautical design draughtsman

Edward Stanley Bishop, Baron Bishopston, PC (3 October 1920 – 19 April 1984) was a British Labour Party politician.

Born in Bristol, Bishop was educated at South Bristol Central School, Merchant Venturers' Technical College and Bristol University. He was an aeronautical design draughtsman. He contested Bristol West in 1950, Exeter in 1951 and South Gloucestershire in 1955.

Bishop was Member of Parliament for Newark from 1964 to 1979, when he lost the seat to the Conservative Richard Alexander. Bishop was an assistant government whip from 1966 to 1967, Second Church Estates Commissioner from 18 April–30 November 1974, and Minister for Agriculture, Fisheries and Food from 1974 to 1979. He was sworn of the Privy Council of the United Kingdom in 1977.

After he lost his seat, he was created a life peer as Baron Bishopston, of Newark in the County of Nottinghamshire on 21 May 1981.

Lord Bishopston died in Devon aged 63.

== Personal life ==
He was married to Winifred and had four daughters: Anne, Mary, Frances and Ursula.

Parliament of the United Kingdom
Preceded by George Deer	Member of Parliament for Newark; 1964–1979	Succeeded by Richard Alexander
