= Sidney Shephard =

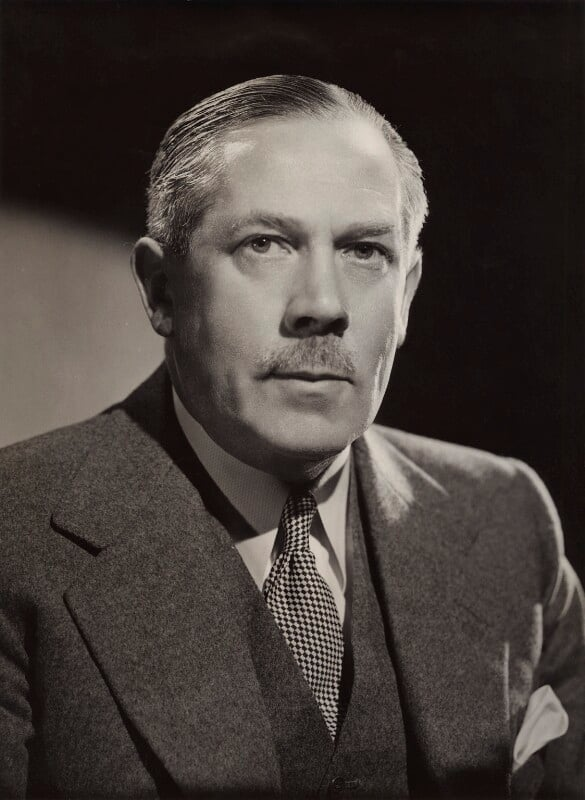
Shephard in 1947

Sidney Shephard MC (29 March 1894 – 25 November 1953) was a British Conservative Party politician.

Shephard was born at Nottingham on 29 March 1894, one of five children of Charles and Mary Shephard. He is recorded in the 1901 Census, aged 7 years, living at 225 Noel Street, Nottingham, where his father's occupation is given as "Late Draughtsman".

In World War I, he was commissioned Second Lieutenant in the 2/7th (Robin Hood) Battalion, Notts and Derby Regiment, on 23 November 1916. His Medal Index Card confirms that he entered the French theatre of war in 1917, although no specific date is given. Under the general reorganisation of 30 January 1918, the 1/7th and 2/7th (Robin Hood) Battalions were effectively merged to form the 7th (Robin Hood) Battalion. Within three months, the reconstituted battalion had suffered grievous losses having fought to a finish at Bullecourt. The action had cost the battalion 653 all ranks, killed, wounded and missing, and it had to be reformed with drafts from other units. As a result of further heavy losses sustained at Neuve Eglise and at Kemmel Hill during April, the 7th (Robin Hood) Battalion was reduced to a cadre on 6 May 1918. Many officers, including Lieutenant Shephard, were drafted into the 1st Battalion Notts and Derby Regiment, on 19 June 1918. Whilst serving with the 1st Battalion, he was awarded the Military Cross for his gallantry near Beauchamp, on the night of the 23/24 June 1918. When in charge of a night patrol consisting of 32 men and a Lewis Gun, he encountered a strong enemy force which he engaged at close quarters, being slightly wounded in the head by a bomb. He successfully withdrew his entire party, including 9 wounded men, over a distance of 450 yards. The award of the MC was announced in the supplement to the London Gazette dated 7 May 1919.

The following recommendation has been extracted from Battalion Orders, a copy of which accompanies the group: "On the night 23/24 June, accompanied by 32 men and a Lewis Gun, he advanced to within 150 yards of the enemy trenches. N.E. of BEAUCHAMP (Sheet57c.S.E. R.I.c.) in order to obtain identifications. Between 40 or 50 of the enemy were observed moving across his flank, and he skillfully manoeuvred in order to bring better fire to bear on them. He waited until they were within ten yards and then gave orders to fire. A rapid fire was brought to bear on the enemy from the Lewis gun and rifles, and it is believed heavy casualties were inflicted on the enemy. He then gave the order to charge, and himself led the charge, but was almost immediately knocked out by an enemy bomb. He was slightly wounded in the head, nine of his party being wounded at the same time. He eventually got the whole of his patrol back to our trenches, a distance of about 450 yards, himself helping to carry in the wounded. If he had not done this, the enemy would in all probability have obtained an identification. At least two of the wounded were quite unable to walk. This Officer has consistently done good work both on patrols and in action."

He was despatched to England for demobilisation on 14 February 1919. His Medal Index Card confirms his eligibility for the award of the Silver War Badge, and also notes his address in 1921 as 10 Barrack Lane, Nottingham.

Shephard married Lily Jane Alexander in 1923, and they raised a family of two sons and a daughter. He became Chairman and Managing Director of Bairns-Wear Ltd, and was Master of the South Notts Hounds. In 1941, he was appointed High Sheriff of Nottinghamshire, and during the Second World War, he acted as Army Welfare Officer, from 1939 until 1947. He also commanded the Newark Home Guard Battalion between 1940 and 1943.

He was elected as Member of Parliament (MP) for Newark at a by-election in June 1943. The vacancy was caused when the Newark's Conservative MP Marquess of Titchfield, succeeded to the peerage in April 1943, as the 7th Duke of Portland. During World War II, the parties in the coalition government had agreed not to contest by-elections in seats held by the other coalition parties, and most vacancies resulted in the unopposed election of the nominee of the party which had previously held the seat. However, independent candidates and minor parties were not bound by the pact, and the Newark by-election was contested by three other candidates. Shephard won the seat, but with less than half the votes: Common Wealth Party candidate won 14% of the votes, and an Independent Progressive won 31%.

Shephard held the seat at the 1945 general election, with a slender majority of 2.8% of the votes over the second-placed Labour Party candidate, Air Vice Marshal H. V. C. de Crespigny.

However, at the 1950 general election, Newark's Labour candidate was George Deer, the outgoing MP for Lincoln. Deer won the seat, ending Shephard's career in the House of Commons.

He died on 25 November 1953, aged 59 years.

Parliament of the United Kingdom
Preceded by Marquess of Titchfield	Member of Parliament for Newark; 1943 – 1950	Succeeded by George Deer
