= North Midland Brigade =

- Active: 1888–1901; 1906–1908
- Country: United Kingdom
- Branch: Volunteer Force
- Type: Infantry
- Size: Brigade
- Part of: Northern Command
- Garrison/HQ: Derby

Commanders
- Notable commanders: Charles Pierrepont, 4th Earl Manvers

The North Midland Brigade was an infantry formation of Britain's Volunteer Force from 1888 to 1908.

== Origins ==
The North Midland Brigade had its origin in the Stanhope Memorandum of December 1888. This proposed a Mobilisation Scheme for units of the Volunteer Force, which would assemble by brigades at key points in case of war. In peacetime the brigades provided a structure for collective training. Under this scheme the Volunteer Battalions of the Lincolnshire and the Sherwood Foresters (Derbyshire) Regiments would assemble at Derby. Later the Leicestershire Battalion was added. The Brigade formed part of Northern Command.

== Organisation ==
The brigade had the following composition:

- Headquarters: Drill Hall, Derby
- 1st Volunteer Battalion, Leicestershire Regiment (joined from South Midland Brigade)
- 1st Volunteer Battalion, Lincolnshire Regiment
- 2nd Volunteer Battalion, Lincolnshire Regiment
- 3rd Volunteer Battalion, Lincolnshire Regiment (raised 1900; attached to Humber Brigade for training)
- 1st Volunteer Battalion, Derbyshire Regiment
- 2nd Volunteer Battalion, Derbyshire Regiment
- 1st (Robin Hood) Nottinghamshire Rifle Volunteer Corps
- 4th (Nottinghamshire) Volunteer Battalion, Derbyshire Regiment
- Supply Detachment, later designated an Army Service Corps Company
- Bearer Company, later part of the Royal Army Medical Corps

Colonel Charles Pierrepont, 4th Earl Manvers (known by the courtesy title of Viscount Newark until 1900) was appointed to command the brigade on 15 January 1896.

== Boer War ==
All the battalions provided volunteers to serve alongside the Regular regiments in the 2nd Boer War and gained the Battle honour South Africa 1900–02.

The brigade was split into two in 1901, forming the Sherwood Foresters Brigade and the Leicester and Lincoln Brigade, each of four battalions. The Sherwood Foresters' HQ remained at Derby under the command of Earl Manvers, the Leicester and Lincolns were based at Lincoln under the commander of the regimental district. However, on 1 June 1906 all the Volunteer brigadiers received new commissions, and Earl Manvers was reappointed to the re-amalgamated North Midland Brigade.

== Territorial Force ==
When the Volunteers ere subsumed into the newTerritorial Force in 1908 under the Haldane Reforms, the North Midland Brigade was incorporated into a new North Midland Division. It was once again split into two brigades of four battalions each: the Lincoln and Leicester Brigade, based at Grantham and the Nottingham and Derby Brigade (later the Sherwood Foresters Brigade) at Nottingham. These brigades, and their 2nd Line duplicates, fought on the Western Front during World War I

== Commanders ==
- Col Charles Pierrepont, 4th Earl Manvers, VD, (known by the courtesy title of Viscount Newark until 1900) was appointed to command the brigade on 15 January 1896, and reappointed on 1 June 1906.
