= Charles Pierrepont, 4th Earl Manvers =

British nobleman and politician (1854-1926)

Arms of Pierrepont: Argent semée of cinquefoils gules, a lion rampant sable

Charles William Sydney Pierrepont, 4th Earl Manvers, VD (2 August 1854 – 17 July 1926), known as Viscount Newark from 1860 to 1900, was a British nobleman and Conservative Party politician.

== Career ==
Born in London, he was the eldest son of Sydney William Herbert Pierrepont, 3rd Earl Manvers. He was educated at Eton, and was styled by the courtesy title of Viscount Newark from 1860 until succeeded to his father's peerage in January 1900.

Newark was a sub-lieutenant in the Grenadier Guards from 1872 until retiring in 1880, and subsequently held a variety of positions in the Yeomanry and Volunteers: captain in the South Nottinghamshire Yeomanry Cavalry; major in the 2nd Volunteer Battalion (later 8th Bn), Sherwood Foresters) and honorary colonel from 1904; colonel commanding the North Midland Brigade 1896–1908. In November 1901 he received the Volunteer Officers' Decoration (VD) for his contribution to the North Midlands Infantry Volunteers.

He was elected at the 1885 general election as the Member of Parliament (MP) for the Newark division of Nottinghamshire. He was re-elected unopposed in 1886 and 1892, and stood down at the 1895 general election. However, his Conservative successor Harold Heneage Finch-Hatton resigned in 1898, and Viscount Newark was returned unopposed at the resulting by-election. He held the seat until his succession to the peerage in 1900.

The 4th Earl was a keen sportsman and was Master of the Rufford Hunt from 1900.

== Family and children ==
In 1880 he married Helen Shaw-Stewart, daughter of Sir Michael Shaw-Stewart, 7th Baronet, and had four children:

- Lady Cicely Mary Pierrepont (1886–1936), married Francis Henry Hardy of Edith Weston Hall, Rutland, in 1915
- Evelyn Robert Pierrepont, 5th Earl Manvers (1888–1940)
- Lady Alice Helen Pierrepont (30 August 1889 – 8 March 1969), buried at Ystrad Mynach
- Lady Sibell Pierrepont (1892–1968), married Hubert Davys Argles in 1923

He died suddenly on 17 July 1926 at his house in Tilney Street, London, at the age of 71.

== Sources ==
- "4th Earl Manvers Bio".
- Leigh Rayment's Peerage Pages

Parliament of the United Kingdom
Preceded by Thomas Earp; William Newzam Nicholson	Member of Parliament for Newark; 1885 – 1895	Succeeded by Harold Heneage Finch-Hatton
Preceded by Harold Heneage Finch-Hatton	Member of Parliament for Newark; 1898 – 1900	Succeeded by Sir Charles Welby, Bt
Peerage of the United Kingdom
Preceded by Sydney Pierrepont	Earl Manvers; 1900–1926	Succeeded by Evelyn Pierrepont
