= Charles Welby =

British civil servant and politician

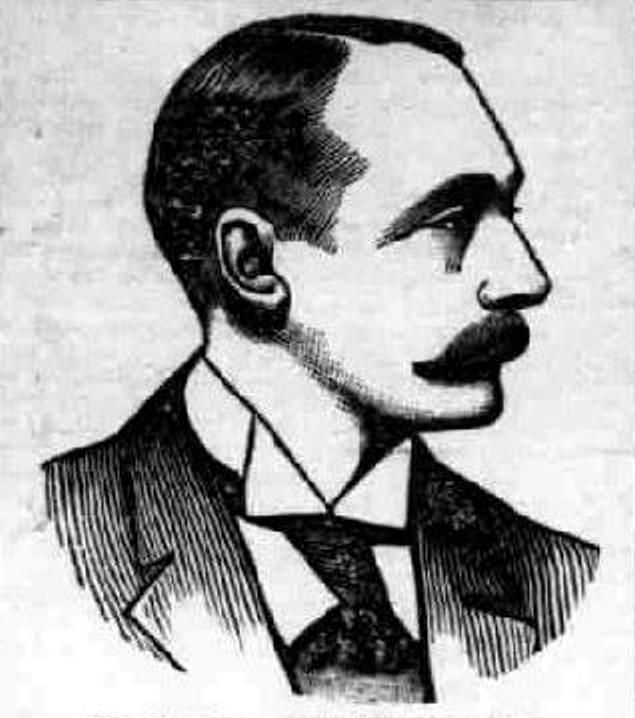

Sir Charles Glynne Earle Welby, 5th Baronet, CB, DL (11 August 1865 – 19 March 1938) was a British civil servant who became a Conservative Party politician. He sat in the House of Commons from 1900 to 1906, and then had a long career in local government in Lincolnshire.

== Early life ==
Welby was the second son of the Conservative Party politician Sir William Welby-Gregory, 4th Baronet and his wife Victoria, a philosopher of language who was the daughter of Charles Stuart-Wortley. He was educated at Eton College and then at Christ Church, Oxford.

Welby succeeded to the baronetcy in 1898 on the death of his father.

== Career ==
From 1887 to 1892, Welby was private secretary to Edward Stanhope, the Conservative Secretary of State for War. When the Conservatives resumed office in 1895 he became private secretary to the new War Secretary Lord Lansdowne, holding the post until 1899 or 1900 He was made a Companion of the Bath (CB) in the 1897 Diamond Jubilee Honours.

After resigning as private secretary in 1899, he was elected at a by-election in February 1900 as the Member of Parliament (MP) for the Newark division of Nottinghamshire, after the sitting Conservative MP Viscount Newark had succeeded to the peerage.

He was re-elected unopposed at the 1900 general election. In November 1900, he was appointed an extra (unpaid) Assistant Under-Secretary of State for War to assist during the pressure of the Second Boer War. He resigned the appointment in August 1902, two months after the end of the war and following the reshuffle of the cabinet.

He stood down from Parliament at the 1906 general election, and concentrated on local government. In 1898, he had succeeded his father an alderman of Kesteven County Council, and remained an alderman until his death 40 years later. He was chairman of the council for many years.

Welby was mayor of Grantham from 1912 to 1913, and also served for long periods as chairman of the governors of Grantham Hospital, and chairman of the governors of The King's School, Grantham. He was also a Justice of the Peace in Kesteven, and a Deputy Lieutenant of Lincolnshire.

== Family ==
In 1887 Welby married Maria Louise Helen, daughter of Lord Augustus Hervey; they were second cousins, as they were both descended from daughters of John Manners, 5th Duke of Rutland. They lived at Denton Manor, near Grantham, and had two sons and four daughters. The eldest son, Richard William Gregory Welby (1888–1914), became a Lieutenant in the Grenadier Guards and was killed in action during World War I, on 16 September 1914.

Maria died in 1920. Her father Lord Augustus Hervey had been the second son of the 2nd Marquess of Bristol. When his older brother, the 3rd Marquess died in August 1907, he would have succeeded to the title had he not died in 1875. On 15 November the King decreed that the children of Lord Augustus would "enjoy the title, rank, place and precedence as the sons and daughters of a Marquess", which they would have held if their father had survived.

Welby died at a nursing home in London on 19 March 1938, aged 72. He was succeeded in the baronetcy by his second son, Oliver Charles Earle Welby (1902–1977).

Parliament of the United Kingdom
Preceded by Viscount Newark	Member of Parliament for Newark; 1900 – 1906	Succeeded by John Ralph Starkey
Baronetage of the United Kingdom
Preceded by William Welby-Gregory	Baronet of Denton Manor; 1898 – 1938	Succeeded by Oliver Charles Earle Welby
