= Fiona Jones =

British journalist and Member of Parliament for Newark (1997–2001)

Member of Parliament for Newark
- In office 1 May 1997 – 14 May 2001
- Preceded by: Richard Alexander
- Succeeded by: Patrick Mercer

Personal details
- Born: Fiona Elizabeth Ann Hamilton; 27 February 1957 Liverpool, United Kingdom
- Died: 28 January 2007 (aged 49) Saxilby, Lincolnshire, United Kingdom
- Party: Labour
- Spouse: Christopher Jones
- Occupation: Journalist

Fiona Elizabeth Ann Jones (née Hamilton; 27 February 1957 – 28 January 2007) was a Labour Party politician in the United Kingdom. She was elected as a Member of Parliament (MP) for Newark in Labour's landslide victory in the 1997 general election.

Jones was accused of fraudulently failing to declare the full amount of her election costs, convicted of election fraud in March 1999, and had the Labour whip withdrawn. She was the first MP to be disqualified from membership of the House of Commons for that offence since it was introduced by the Corrupt and Illegal Practices Prevention Act 1883. However, the Court of Appeal overturned her conviction within weeks: the disqualification was revoked, and she resumed her place in the House of Commons. However, she lost her seat in the 2001 general election. She later lost a civil case brought against the police for malicious prosecution.

== Early life ==
Jones was born in Liverpool and grew up in Fazakerley as an only child. Her father, Fred Hamilton, was a production manager for a pharmaceutical company, and was a friend of Labour MP Eric Heffer. Heffer gave her a copy of The Ragged Trousered Philanthropists when she was young, which inspired her to become an active socialist. She attended Wirral College of Art and Preston College, and joined the Labour Party at the age of 17.

She became a freelance journalist; her future husband, Christopher Jones, was also a journalist, who worked for the BBC. The couple moved to Lincolnshire. They were married in north Wales in 1982. They had two sons; Penri and Huw.

== Political career ==
Jones was elected as a Labour member of West Lindsey District Council, gaining Gainsborough South West ward from the Liberal Democrats in 1990. She served a single term and did not seek re-election in 1994. She was unsuccessful as the Labour parliamentary candidate in the Conservative stronghold of Gainsborough and Horncastle in the 1992 general election, finishing in third place. Subsequently she failed to secure the Labour nomination either for the marginal seat of Lincoln or for the safe Labour seat of Liverpool Riverside.

In September 1995, she was selected to contest the Newark constituency. Although she presented herself at the selection meetings as a traditional socialist, she was nevertheless a New Labour professional. After being selected she made known her New Labour sympathies, much to the consternation of a number of local party activists who had supported her nomination.

She was elected as Member of Parliament for Newark in the 1997 general election, ousting Conservative MP Richard Alexander, who had held the seat since the 1979 general election. She was pictured alongside 96 other women Labour MPs in the "Blair babes" photograph, and seen next to Tony Blair himself.

However, the press labelled her the "parliamentary virgin", as she was the last of the 242 new MPs to make their maiden speech in the Commons. "Having endured through gritted teeth being dubbed a 'Blair's babe', I am grateful at least to have the opportunity to relinquish for ever the title of being the last virgin in the House," she announced upon making the speech in January 1998. A Roman Catholic, Jones campaigned against abortion, and she appeared with Lord Longford at a Labour conference fringe meeting.

In Parliament, Jones was a member of the Agriculture Select Committee.

After complaints by the Liberal Democrats, the police launched an investigation into her spending at the 1997 election campaign. Although submitting election expenses within the permitted maximum, she was charged (alongside her agent Des Whicher) with having fraudulently omitted to declare spending which would have taken her well over it. Although most of the charges collapsed and were withdrawn by the trial judge, a dispute over the rent for a campaign office used also as party headquarters was left to the jury. The two were convicted on 19 March 1999 of "corrupt practices", under section 82(6) of the Representation of the People Act 1983 and she was sentenced to 100 hours' community service. Prominent members of the local Labour Party gave evidence against her, and much was made at the time of her rivals for the Labour Party candidacy. At the selection meeting of the Newark Branch Labour Party, the local candidate came in a poor fourth, and withdrew from the contest at that stage. The runner-up, Nick Palmer, went on to win the Labour Party candidacy for the Broxtowe constituency. As a result of the conviction, Jones was disqualified from the House of Commons.

However, the Court of Appeal quashed the convictions on 15 April 1999.

A divisional court of the Queen's Bench Division held that the effect of the quashing of the conviction was that the disqualification was revoked with no need for a by-election, and she resumed her seat on 29 April.

She contested her seat at the 2001 general election, but lost to the Conservative candidate Patrick Mercer. In the twelve months before the 2001 election, the local newspaper, the Newark Advertiser, restricted reporting of her routine activities after she unsuccessfully demanded that every report concerning her should be submitted for her approval before publication; the newspaper lifted the restriction during the campaign.

== Later life ==
After studying law at the University of Lincoln, Jones brought a civil case against Nottinghamshire Police for malicious prosecution. The case was dismissed in December 2005, leaving her to bear costs of £45,000. In an interview, she claimed that a government minister had asked her for sex in return for assisting her to secure promotion.

== Death ==
Jones reportedly became reliant on alcohol after she was shunned by her colleagues when she returned to the House of Commons in 1999; only 34 MPs signed an early day motion welcoming her back to the House of Commons after her conviction was quashed. Her husband said that she refused to attend Alcoholics Anonymous meetings in case she was recognised.

She was found dead by her husband at her home in Saxilby; reportedly she was surrounded by 15 empty vodka bottles. Her cause of death was reported as alcoholism or alcoholic liver disease.

Parliament of the United Kingdom
Preceded by Richard Alexander	Member of Parliament for Newark; 1997–2001	Succeeded by Patrick Mercer
