= Grosvenor Hodgkinson =

English lawyer and Liberal politician

Grosvenor Hodgkinson (1818 – 14 February 1881) was an English lawyer and Liberal Party politician who sat in the House of Commons from 1859 to 1874.

Hodgkinson was the son of George Hodgkinson and his wife Julia Beevor, daughter of the Rev. John. Beevor, Rector of Claypole, Lincolnshire. He was educated at the grammar school at Louth, and was admitted an attorney and solicitor in 1839. He was in practice at Newark, in partnership with J. T. B. Pratt, but gave up his legal practice in 1870. He was a director of the Law Life Assurance Co. and the Midland Railway Company and chairman of the London Chatham and Dover Railway. He was also a justice of the peace (JP) for Newark and Nottinghamshire.

At the 1859 general election Hodgkinson was elected as a member of parliament (MP) for Newark, defeating the sitting Liberal MP the Earl of Lincoln. He was re-elected in 1865 and in 1868, and held the seat until he stood down from Parliament at the 1874 general election.

Hodgkinson died on 15 February 1881, at his home in Newark, aged 62.

Hodgkinson married Alice Harvey, daughter of Robert Harvey of Balderton in 1845.

Parliament of the United Kingdom
Preceded by Earl of Lincoln; John Handley	Member of Parliament for Newark; 1859 – 1874; With: John Handley to 1865; Lord Arthur Pelham-Clinton 1865–1868; Edward Denison 1868–1870; Samuel Bristowe from 1870	Succeeded by Thomas Earp; Samuel Bristowe
