= William Newzam Nicholson =

English politician

Nicholson in 1880

William Newzam Nicholson (1816 – 17 May 1899) was an English Conservative Party politician who sat in the House of Commons from 1880 to 1885.

Nicholson was the son of Benjamin Nicholson of Newark and his wife Frances Newzam, daughter of John Newzam of Newark. He was educated at the Magnus Grammar School at Newark and founded a business in agricultural engineering. In 1851 he was mayor of Newark. He was J.P. for Newark and became chairman of the school board in 1871.

At the 1880 general election Nicholson was elected as a member of parliament (MP) for Newark. He held the seat until the 1885 general election, when the two-seat parliamentary borough of Newark was abolished under the Redistribution of Seats Act. The town was then represented as part of a single-seat county division of Nottinghamshire, but Nicholson did not stand in the election.

Nicholson died at the age of 82.

Nicholson married firstly Maria Alice Betts of Newark in 1842, and secondly Annie Prior, daughter of Joseph Prior of Woodstock in 1866. Their son William was an artist and the father of Ben Nicholson and Nancy Nicholson.

Parliament of the United Kingdom
Preceded by Samuel Boteler Bristowe; Thomas Earp	Member of Parliament for Newark; 1880 – 1885; With: Thomas Earp	Succeeded by Viscount Newark
