= John Stuart (judge) =

British Conservative Party politician and judge

Sir John Stuart (1793 – 29 October 1876) was a British Conservative Party politician who sat in the House of Commons from 1846 to 1852, before becoming a judge.

== Early life ==
Stuart was the son of Dugald Stuart, of Ballachulish in Argyll. He was called to the bar at Lincoln's Inn in November 1819.

== Career ==
He was elected as a Member of Parliament (MP) for the borough of Newark-on-Trent at an unopposed by-election in January 1846. The borough was at that time under the patronage of the Dukes of Newcastle-under-Lyne, and the 4th Duke was a staunch Conservative and protectionist. In an address "to the free and independent-minded electors of the borough of Newark", he pledged himself as a "firm supporter" of the Church of England and of the Corn Laws, claiming that their abolition would "injure the best interests of our empire". The hustings took place in the town square of Newark in heavy rain on the morning of 29 January 1846, where Stuart spoke in favour of protection for agriculture and for industry. Since no other candidate was proposed, Stuart was nominated and promptly declared elected. He was re-elected at the 1847 general election.

At the 1852 general election he did not stand again in Newark. The 5th Duke (who had succeeded in 1851) was a supporter of free trade, and declined to support Stuart. Stuart was elected instead for the borough of Bury St Edmunds. He resigned that seat later the same year to take up the post of Vice Chancellor (i.e. a judge of the Court of Chancery). He succeeded James Parker, who had died, after some speculation. Earlier that year Stuart had refused the post of Solicitor General in Lord Derby's new government, and was reported to be indignant that he was not appointed Lord Chancellor. Whilst he was reported by The Times to be eminently qualified for the role, it was suggested that his Ultra-Toryism and opposition to reform of Chancery would make his appointment unpopular.

He was knighted in 1853, and sat as a judge until 1871, when he retired on a pension and was sworn as member of the Privy Council.

== Family ==
In 1813, Stuart married Jessie, the daughter of Duncan Stewart.

He was a landlord in Scotland, with estates at Loch Carron in Ross-shire and Grishernish on the Isle of Skye. He was reported by The Times newspaper to be a "deservedly popular" landlord.

== Arms ==
Coat of arms of John Stuart

Crest
A lion's head erased Gules.
Escutcheon
Quarterly 1st & 4th Or a fess chequy Azure and Argent (Stuart) 2nd & 3rd Or a lymphad Sable (Lorn).
Motto
Spero Meliora

"I aspire to greater things"

Parliament of the United Kingdom
Preceded by William Ewart Gladstone; Lord John Manners	Member of Parliament for Newark; 1846 – 1852; With: Lord John Manners; John Manners-Sutton	Succeeded by Granville Harcourt-Vernon; John Manners-Sutton
Preceded by Edward Bunbury; The Earl Jermyn	Member of Parliament for Bury St Edmunds; 1852 – 1852; With: The Earl Jermyn	Succeeded by James Oakes; The Earl Jermyn
