= Richard Alexander (British politician) =

British politician

Member of Parliament for Newark
- In office 3 May 1979 – 1 May 1997
- Preceded by: Edward Stanley Bishop
- Succeeded by: Fiona Jones

Personal details
- Born: 29 June 1934 Aberdeen, Scotland
- Died: 20 April 2008 (aged 73) Newark-on-Trent, Nottinghamshire, England
- Party: Conservative
- Spouses: Valerie Ann Winn (m. 1966; div. 1985) Pat Hanson (m. 1987)
- Children: 2
- Education: University College London; Institute of Advanced Legal Studies

Richard Thain Alexander (29 June 1934 – 20 April 2008) was a Conservative Party politician in the United Kingdom. He was Member of Parliament (MP) for Newark in Nottinghamshire until losing his seat in the landslide of the 1997 general election.

== Early life ==
Alexander was born in Aberdeen, although his father was an architect from Lincoln. He went to Logie Coldstone prep school in Eastbourne and Dewsbury Grammar School and the Wheelwright School in Dewsbury, Yorkshire before studying law at University College London and then at the Institute of Advanced Legal Studies. He was articled in London, and then worked as a solicitor in Scunthorpe from 1960 to 1964 and then in Retford, Nottinghamshire from 1964 to 1985.

== Political career ==
Having joined the Young Conservatives in 1957, Alexander served on their National Advisory Committee in 1961 and fought his first elections in 1962 and 1963, standing (unsuccessfully) for Scunthorpe Town Council. He was elected to Retford Borough Council in 1965 and to Nottinghamshire County Council in 1967, serving until 1974. He was elected to Bassetlaw District Council in 1975, and he was Mayor of Retford in 1977–78.

He was a parliamentary candidate for Lincoln in 1966 and again in 1970, but he was not chosen by the right-wing local party to fight the by-election of 1973. The seat was won by the sitting MP, Dick Taverne, each time.

At the 1979 general election, Alexander narrowly and unexpectedly beat the popular Labour MP for Newark, Edward Stanley Bishop despite the remaining presence of working mines in the constituency.

He adopted a maverick approach in the House of Commons, and was never made a Minister. He was fully in support of the Conservatives on defence issues, describing Tony Benn's approach to the Falklands War as a "prima facie case of treason and sedition" and strongly opposing the "no first use" pledge on nuclear weapons. On other issues he was more moderate, being a member of the Tory Campaign for Homosexual Equality for a time (he resigned over a controversial article which suggested that Prince Charles should embrace Prince Edward in order to advance their campaign). Alexander could also appear a classic Tory. He faithfully supported Margaret Thatcher, bridled at the poor dress sense of the Labour MP Terry Fields (a member of the Militant group), supported rate capping of left-wing councils, and sought the abolition of Wages Councils which set minimum pay rates.

His majority was substantially increased at the 1983 general election, after boundary changes removing the mining area to the neighbouring Sherwood constituency (although that too went Conservative in 1983). He also supported the Union of Democratic Mineworkers in the 1984 UK miners' strike, but criticised the 31 pit closures announced by Michael Heseltine in October 1992. He was one of many Conservative MPs to lose their seats in the Labour landslide at the 1997 general election. The victor, Fiona Jones, was convicted of falsifying her election expenses in March 1999, and Alexander was to stand at the resulting by-election, but the conviction was quashed by the Court of Appeal in April 1999 with no need for a by-election.

After his time in Parliament, Alexander was subsequently elected to serve as a councillor for the Magnus ward of Newark and Sherwood District Council.

== Personal life ==
He married Valerie Ann Winn in 1966. They had a son and a daughter. He separated from his first wife in 1979 and they were divorced in 1985. He remarried in 1987, to Pat Hanson.

Alexander died aged 73 at Beaumond House Community Hospice, Newark-on-Trent, after a short battle with cancer.

Parliament of the United Kingdom
Preceded by Edward Stanley Bishop	Member of Parliament for Newark; 1979–1997	Succeeded by Fiona Jones
