= Edward Denison (philanthropist) =

English philanthropist

Edward Denison (September 1840 – 26 January 1870) was an English philanthropist, known for his self-denying benevolent labours in the East End of London and a Liberal politician who sat in the House of Commons from 1868 to 1870.

Denison was the son of Edward Denison, Bishop of Salisbury and his wife Louisa Ker Seymer. He was educated at Eton College and at Christ Church, Oxford graduating MA in 1865. He was called to the bar at Lincoln's Inn in 1867.

At the 1868 general election, Denison was elected Liberal Member of Parliament (MP) for Newark-on-Trent and held the seat until his death in 1870.

Denison died unmarried at the age of 29. He was nephew of Evelyn Denison, Speaker of the House of Commons.

Parliament of the United Kingdom
| Preceded by Grosvenor Hodgkinson; Arthur Pelham-Clinton | Member of Parliament for Newark; 1868–1870; With: Grosvenor Hodgkinson | Succeeded by Grosvenor Hodgkinson; Samuel Bristowe |
