= Patrick Mercer =

English author (born 1956)

Patrick Mercer OBE

Shadow Minister for Security
- In office 1 July 2003 – 3 July 2007
- Leader: Michael Howard; David Cameron
- Succeeded by: Crispin Blunt

Member of Parliament for Newark
- In office 7 June 2001 – 30 April 2014
- Preceded by: Fiona Jones
- Succeeded by: Robert Jenrick

Personal details
- Born: Patrick John Mercer; 26 June 1956 (age 70) Stockport, Cheshire, England
- Party: Independent
- Other political affiliations: Conservative (until 2013)
- Spouse: Cait Mercer
- Education: Exeter College, Oxford; Cranfield University

Military service
- Allegiance: United Kingdom
- Branch/service: British Army
- Years of service: 1975–1999
- Rank: Colonel
- Unit: Worcestershire and Sherwood Foresters Regiment

Patrick John Mercer (born 26 June 1956) is an English author and former politician. He was elected as a Conservative in the 2001 general election, until resigning the party's parliamentary whip in May 2013 following questions surrounding paid advocacy, and was an Independent MP representing the constituency of Newark in Parliament until his resignation at the end of April 2014 when a Standards Committee report recommended suspending him for six months for "sustained and pervasive breach of the house's rules". He was Conservative shadow homeland security minister from 2003 to 2007, when David Cameron forced him to resign after he had made remarks about racism which Cameron found unacceptable.

Mercer is a frequent commentator on defence and security issues, having served as a colonel in the British Army and as a BBC journalist. He has to date written four military novels and is a patron of the Victoria Cross Trust.

== Early life and education ==
Born in Stockport in Cheshire in 1956, Mercer is the son of Eric Mercer, who became Bishop of Exeter. His mother was born in Lincolnshire and his father was trained for the priesthood at Kelham Theological College near Newark.

Mercer was educated at The King's School, Chester, and Exeter College, Oxford, where he read history. He was later commissioned after training at the Royal Military Academy Sandhurst. Whilst there, he was one of a number of cadets interviewed for an edition of the BBC's Panorama programme.

== British Army career ==
Mercer followed his father, who saw wartime service in the Sherwood Foresters (Notts & Derby Regiment), into the British Army. He was commissioned into the Worcestershire and Sherwood Foresters Regiment on 8 March 1975 as a second lieutenant. His service number was 499748. On 8 March 1977, he was promoted to lieutenant. He was promoted to captain on 8 September 1981, and to major on 30 September 1988. On 30 June 1994, he was promoted to lieutenant colonel, assuming command of the 1st Battalion of the Worcestershire and Sherwood Foresters in December 1995. He was promoted to colonel on 30 June 1998.

During his time in the Army, Mercer completed nine tours in Northern Ireland and latterly commanded his battalion in Bosnia and Herzegovina, Canada and Tidworth. Mercer served at both the Staff College, Camberley, and the Army's University at Cranfield.

Mercer was Mentioned in Despatches in 1983 for "gallant and distinguished service in Northern Ireland during the period 1 November 1982 to 31 January 1983". He earned a gallantry commendation in 1990. He was made an MBE on 12 October 1993 "in recognition of distinguished service in Northern Ireland". He was made an OBE on 13 May 1997 "in recognition of gallant and distinguished services in the former Yugoslavia during the period 21 June to 20 December 1996". He left the Army in 1999 as a colonel, He retired from the army on 1 September 1999, his last posting having been as head of communications and strategy at the Army Training and Recruiting Agency.

== Journalism ==
After leaving the Army, Mercer was a defence reporter for BBC Radio 4's Today programme. He reported from trouble spots, including Kosovo.

On being selected as Conservative candidate in Newark, Mercer left the BBC and became a freelance journalist writing for The Daily Telegraph. He continued to contribute to radio, television, and print media, mainly on security and defence issues, and in The House magazine in 2009 his profession was stated as Journalist.

== Political career ==
=== Parliament from 2001 ===
Mercer was first elected to Parliament as the member for Newark at the 2001 general election, defeating the Labour incumbent, Fiona Jones, overturning a majority of 3,000 and creating a majority of just over 4,000. In the Commons, he initially served as a back-bencher on the Defence Select Committee before becoming Parliamentary Private Secretary to the Shadow Secretary of State for Defence. Mercer backed Iain Duncan Smith over Kenneth Clarke in the 2001 Conservative leadership election. Subsequently, he was appointed to a newly created post of Shadow Minister for Homeland Security in June 2003 after Duncan Smith became Conservative leader.

In 2004 he introduced a Private Member's Bill in response to the publicity surrounding the case of Tony Martin that proposed to give householders greater powers when protecting their property from burglary.

Mercer increased his majority in Newark to 6,464 at the 2005 general election.

=== Parliament from 2005 ===
During the Conservative leadership contest which followed the 2005 election, Mercer publicly backed David Davis over David Cameron, Kenneth Clarke, and Liam Fox.

Since 2005, he has repeatedly warned against the imposition of control orders as being 'counter productive'. Citing his experience of internment in Northern Ireland, as a serving soldier, he highlighted the danger of alienating populations needed for intelligence gathering.

In March 2007, Mercer gave an interview to The Times in which he talked about "idle and useless" ethnic minority soldiers who had used racism as a "cover" and admitted that black soldiers in his regiment had been referred to as "black bastard" and "nigger". Initially, the Conservative Party stated that the comments were a "private matter", but soon David Cameron forced Mercer to resign as Shadow Minister for Homeland Security. Mercer publicly apologised and said "I had the privilege to command soldiers from across the east Midlands, of whom many came from racial minorities. It was a matter of great pride to me that racial minorities prospered inside the unit. What I have said is clearly misjudged and I can only apologise if I have embarrassed in any way those fine men whom I commanded. I have no hesitation in resigning my front-bench appointment." A black former corporal who had served with Mercer came to his defence, and the chairwoman of his Conservative Association said she was "extremely angry" that Mercer's comments had been taken out of context.

In December 2008, Mercer was appointed as Chairman of the House of Commons Sub-Committee on Counter-Terrorism, to further his work as a member of the Home Affairs Select Committee.

In March 2009 Mercer volunteered for three days at a charity named Save the Family, learning and helping displaced families as part of a programme devised by Iain Duncan Smith.

=== Parliament from 2010 ===
At the 2010 general election, Mercer more than doubled his majority to 16,152, to make Newark one of the safest Conservative seats in the country. In August 2010, based on intelligence from serving army officers, he warned that dissident Irish terror groups could be planning to attack the party conferences, including the Conservative Party Conference in Birmingham.

In May 2011, Mercer was appointed with Lord Ashcroft to review the future of the military bases in Cyprus.

In August 2011, Mercer with his knowledge of Northern Ireland, led the calls for considering the use of water cannon and other robust police tactics to deal with the rioters during the 2011 England riots. The next day David Cameron approved the use of water cannon after chairing a session of the Cabinet Office Briefing Room, Cobra.

In October 2011, Mercer supported a failed bid by the Everyday Champions Church to open a free school in his constituency. The bid was rejected because of concerns over the church's explicitly creationist stance.

In November 2011, the press reported that Mercer had been taped making disparaging remarks about David Cameron, calling him "despicable" and describing him as an "arse" and "the worst politician in British history since William Gladstone". The same articles claimed he had predicted that Cameron would be ousted by Conservative MPs in early 2012. Mercer later denied making the comments.

=== Resignation ===
Mercer resigned the Conservative Party whip on 31 May 2013 following an investigation by The Daily Telegraph and BBC's Panorama caught him on camera accepting payment for lobbying.

In June 2013, less than two weeks after Mercer had resigned the party whip, it was reported that in talking to an undercover reporter he had described a meeting with a young Israeli woman who said she was a soldier. He told the reporter he had thought to himself "You don't look like a soldier to me. You look like a bloody Jew". He then spoke to Jewish News and apologised unreservedly for any offence he had caused to the Jewish community by his "stupid remark".

On 29 April 2014, after seeing a Commons Select Committee on Standards report into his conduct, due to be published on 1 May, calling for him to be barred from Parliament for six months, Mercer announced he would resign his seat. He was appointed to the Chiltern Hundreds the next day, making his resignation effective.

The Commons Standards Committee report on Mercer stated that its members were "not aware of a case relating to a sitting MP which has involved such a sustained and pervasive breach of the house's rules on registration, declaration and paid advocacy." It stated that Mercer "had deliberately evaded the rules", including engaging in "paid advocacy" and failing to make "any serious attempt to identify his ultimate clients". He had also failed to register monies received properly; to deposit the contract he signed to provide services; and to declare a relevant interest when tabling parliamentary questions, tabling an early-day motion, making approaches to other MPs, and when speaking at a meeting of the All-Party Parliamentary Group. Mercer was also criticised for "repeatedly denigrating fellow Members both individually and collectively".

The recommended period of suspension from the House of Commons was the second longest suspension since 1947. (Denis MacShane, later convicted of a criminal offence, was suspended for twelve months in 2012, and also resigned immediately as an MP.) One member voted to expel Mercer as an MP, and another wanted him suspended for eight months.

A by-election for the vacant Newark seat was held on 5 June 2014.

== Publications ==
- Mercer, Patrick (1998). Inkerman, 1854: The Soldier's Battle. Osprey. ISBN 978-1-85532-618-7.
- Mercer, Patrick (1998). Give Them A Volley And Charge!: Battle of Inkerman. Spellmount Publishers Ltd. ISBN 978-1-86227-025-1.
- Mercer, Patrick (2009). To Do And Die. Harper Collins. ISBN 978-0-00-730278-9.
- Mercer, Patrick (2010). Dust and Steel. Harper Collins. ISBN 978-0-00-730272-7.
- Mercer, Patrick (2011). Red Runs the Helmand. Harper Collins. ISBN 978-0-00-730275-8.

Parliament of the United Kingdom
Preceded by Fiona Jones	Member of Parliament for Newark; 2001–2014	Succeeded by Robert Jenrick
