= Sir John Starkey, 1st Baronet =

British politician

Sir John Ralph Starkey, 1st Baronet (1 May 1859 – 13 November 1940) was a British Conservative Party politician.

== Life ==
He was elected as member of parliament (MP) for Newark at the 1906 general election, and held the seat until he retired from the House of Commons at the 1922 general election.

In 1910, his gardener planted the first commercial orchard of Bramley apples at Starkey's Norwood Park estate. It was still in cultivation by the family in 2017.

Starkey was appointed a deputy lieutenant of Nottinghamshire in 1906, and was made a baronet in July 1935, of Norwood Park in the parish of Southwell and County of Nottingham.

He died in 1940.

Parliament of the United Kingdom
Preceded by Sir Charles Welby, Bt	Member of Parliament for Newark; 1906 – 1922	Succeeded by Marquess of Titchfield
Baronetage of the United Kingdom
New creation	Baronet (of Norwood Park, Nottinghamshire); 1935–1940	Succeeded by William Randle Starkey
