= Samuel Bristowe =

English barrister and Liberal politician

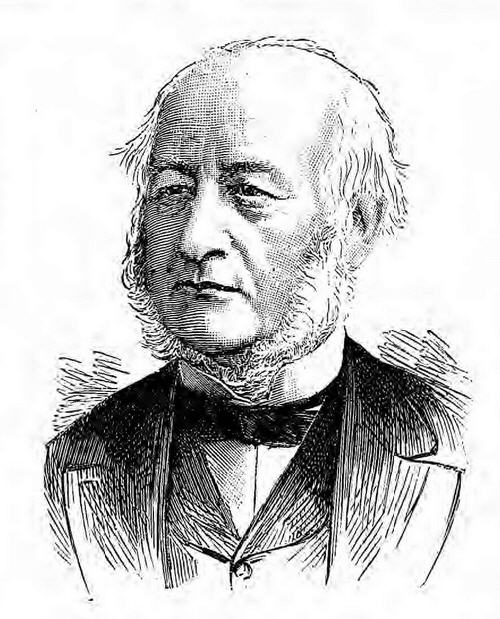

Samuel Boteler Bristowe QC (5 October 1822 – 5 March 1897) was an English barrister and Liberal Party politician from Nottinghamshire. He sat in the House of Commons from 1870 to 1880, and later became a county court judge, surviving a murder attempt in 1889.

== Early life ==
Bristowe was the son of Samuel Ellis Bristowe of Beesthorpe Hall, near Caunton in Nottinghamshire and his wife Mary Ann Fox. He was educated at Trinity Hall, Cambridge, where he graduated with a BA degree in 1845, receiving his MA in 1848. He was called to the bar in 1849 at the Inner Temple, and was appointed in 1869 as Recorder of Newark-on-Trent.

He became a Queen's Counsel (QC) in 1872, and was a member of the Council for Legal Education as well as being one of the editors of "Burn's Justice of the Peace".

== Political career ==
In April 1870, Bristowe was elected as a member of parliament (MP) for Newark, at a by-election following the death of the Liberal MP Edward Denison. After his election, he resigned his post as Recorder of Newark but became a bencher of his inn and Queen's Counsel in 1872. He was re-elected for Newark at the 1874 general election, and held the seat until he was defeated at the 1880 general election.

General elections were then held over a period of several weeks, with different constituencies voting on different days. After his defeat in Newark, Bristowe still had time to be selected a few days later as a Liberal candidate for the Southern division of Nottinghamshire, where he duly stood. However, both of the division's two seats had been held unopposed by the Conservatives since 1837; no Liberal candidate had stood since 1835. Bristowe polled a poor third, behind the two successful Conservative candidates.

== Judge ==
After leaving Parliament, Bristowe was a County Court Judge from 1880 to 1891. He was appointed initially to the Midland County Court, where an attempt was made to kill him in 1889. At a sitting of the Nottingham District County Court, Bristowe had dismissed a civil action in which a German manufacturer of false teeth sued someone for the value of a set of teeth. The plaintiff, William Edward Arnemann, who lived in Nottingham, had previously been prosecuted for falsely advertising himself as a dentist. He had brought several similar cases for non-payment, most of which failed because the teeth did not fit. On this occasion, he denounced the ruling, claiming that he was being outlawed.

After court sittings, Bristowe routinely left Nottingham on the 5.40pm Great Northern train to return to his home at West Hallam in Derbyshire, and on this occasion was followed unobserved by Arnemann, who bought a ticket to the same destination and followed the judge onto the platform. When Bristowe went to board his first-class carriage, Arnemann shot him in the back, firing one shot from a full-loaded six-chambered revolver. Bristowe collapsed unconscious, but recovered consciousness before being taken to hospital. The Times newspaper reported that Arnemann said "I have had his blood; I wish I may have killed him".

The bullet was not removed, and remained in Bristowe's body until his death.

Later in 1891 he was succeeded as Treasurer of the Inner Temple by William Pearson, Karl Pearson's father.

== Family ==
Bristowe married Albertine Eugenie Elizabeth Lavit, daughter of Jean Jacques Lavit of Paris and Isabella Roper, on 1 July 1856. He lived at Beesthorpe, Nottinghamshire and died at St Leonards on Sea, aged 74.

His brother, Sir Henry Fox Bristowe, Q.C., was Vice-Chancellor of the Duchy of Lancaster. Samuel's son, the Rev. Charles John Bristowe, served from 1902 to 1911 as the first Director of Education for Nottinghamshire.

Parliament of the United Kingdom
Preceded by Edward Denison; Grosvenor Hodgkinson	Member of Parliament for Newark; 1870–1880; With: Grosvenor Hodgkinson to 1874; Thomas Earp from 1874	Succeeded by William Nicholson; Thomas Earp
