= John Handley (MP) =

John Handley (December 1807 – 8 December 1869) was a Liberal Party politician in England.

At the 1857 general election he was elected as a Member of Parliament (MP) for the borough of Newark in Nottinghamshire. He was re-elected in 1859, and stood down from the House of Commons at the 1865 general election.

Parliament of the United Kingdom
Preceded by Granville Harcourt-Vernon; John Manners-Sutton	Member of Parliament for Newark; 1857 – 1865; With: Earl of Lincoln to 1859; Grosvenor Hodgkinson from 1859	Succeeded by Lord Arthur Pelham-Clinton; Grosvenor Hodgkinson
