= Granville Harcourt-Vernon (1816–1861) =

Granville Edward Harcourt-Vernon (23 November 1816 – 1 February 1861) was a British Conservative Party politician.

== Background ==
Harcourt-Vernon was the eldest son of Granville Harcourt-Vernon, sixth son of the Most Reverend Edward Venables-Vernon-Harcourt, Archbishop of York. His mother was Frances Julia, daughter of Anthony Hardolph Eyre.

== Political career ==
Harcourt-Vernon was a member of the Canterbury Association from 8 November 1851 and immediately joined the management committee. Harcourt-Vernon was returned to the House of Commons at the 1852 general election as one of the two Members of Parliament (MPs) for Newark, but did not stand again at the 1857 election.

== Family ==
Harcourt-Vernon married Lady Selina Catherine, daughter of Richard Meade, 3rd Earl of Clanwilliam, in 1854. He died in February 1861, aged 44. His wife remarried twice and died in November 1911.

== See also ==
- Baron Vernon

Parliament of the United Kingdom
Preceded by John Stuart; Hon. John Manners-Sutton	Member of Parliament for Newark; 1852 – 1857; With: Hon. John Manners-Sutton	Succeeded by The Earl of Lincoln; John Handley
