= Newark (constituency) =

Parliamentary constituency in the United Kingdom, 1885 onwards

Coordinates: 53.10°N 0.90°W

- County constituency for the House of Commons
- Interactive map of boundaries from 2024
- Location within the East Midlands
- Local government in England: Nottinghamshire
- Electorate: 76,478 (March 2020)
- Major settlements: Newark-on-Trent, Southwell, Bingham

Current constituency
- Created: 1885
- Member of Parliament: Robert Jenrick (Reform UK)
- Seats: One

1673–1885
- Seats: Two
- Type of constituency: Borough constituency

Newark is a constituency (Note: A county constituency (for the purposes of election expenses and type of returning officer)) in Nottinghamshire, England. It is represented by Robert Jenrick, of Reform UK. Jenrick won the seat as a Conservative in a by-election on 5 June 2014, following the resignation of Patrick Mercer in April 2014. He defected to Reform UK in January 2026. (Note: As with all constituencies, the constituency elects one Member of Parliament (MP) by the first-past-the-post system of election at least every five years.)

== Constituency profile ==
Newark is a constituency in Nottinghamshire. Its largest town is Newark-on-Trent, which, when taken together with the connected villages of Balderton and Farndon, has a population of around 49,000. Other settlements in the constituency include the towns of Bingham, Southwell and Tuxford and the village of Collingham.

Newark is a large, rural constituency between the cities of Nottingham and Lincoln with many small villages. Newark-on-Trent is a market town with many historic buildings, including a 12th-century castle, and was traditionally an important inland port on the River Trent. The town has average levels of wealth, with some deprived suburban neighbourhoods. Southwell is a highly-affluent town with an Anglican cathedral. The rural parts of the constituency are generally wealthy and contain a number of former and current Royal Air Force bases. The average house price is lower than the national average but higher than the rest of the East Midlands.

In general, residents of the constituency are older, more religious and have average levels of education compared to the rest of the country. The homeownership rate is high, and rates of household income and child poverty are in line with national averages. A high proportion of residents work in the agriculture, manufacturing and transport sectors, and a low percentage claim unemployment benefits. White people made up 96% of the population at the 2021 census.

At the local council level, most of the constituency is represented by Conservatives with some independents elected in Newark-on-Trent and Bingham and Liberal Democrats in Southwell. Whilst most of Nottinghamshire is represented by Reform UK at the county council, which held elections in 2025, this constituency continues to be represented mostly by Conservatives. An estimated 58% of voters in the Newark constituency supported leaving the European Union in the 2016 referendum, higher than the nationwide figure of 52%.

== Boundaries ==
=== Historic ===
1918–1950: The Municipal Borough of Newark, and the Rural Districts of Bingham, Newark, and Southwell.

1950–1955: The Municipal Borough of Newark, the Urban District of Mansfield Woodhouse, and the Rural Districts of Newark and Southwell.

1955–1983: The Municipal Borough of Newark, and the Rural Districts of Newark and Southwell.

1983–2010: The District of Newark wards of Beacon, Bridge, Bullpit Pinfold, Castle, Caunton, Collingham, Devon, Elston, Farndon, Magnus, Meering, Milton Lowfield, Muskham, Southwell East, Southwell West, Sutton on Trent, Trent, and Winthorpe, and the District of Bassetlaw wards of East Markham, East Retford East, East Retford North, East Retford West, Elkesley, Trent, and Tuxford.

2010–2024: The District of Newark and Sherwood wards of Balderton North, Balderton West, Beacon, Bridge, Castle, Caunton, Collingham and Meering, Devon, Farndon, Lowdham, Magnus, Muskham, Southwell East, Southwell North, Southwell West, Sutton-on-Trent, Trent, and Winthorpe, the District of Bassetlaw wards of East Markham, Rampton, Tuxford, and Trent, and the Borough of Rushcliffe wards of Bingham East, Bingham West, Cranmer, Oak, and Thoroton.

=== Current ===
Further to the 2023 review of Westminster constituencies, which came into effect for the 2024 general election, the composition of the constituency was defined as follows (as they existed on 1 December 2020):

- The District of Bassetlaw wards of: Clayworth; East Markham; Rampton; Sturton; Tuxford and Trent.
- The District of Newark & Sherwood wards of: Balderton North & Coddington; Balderton South; Beacon; Bridge; Castle; Collingham; Devon; Farndon & Fernwood; Muskham; Southwell; Sutton-on-Trent; Trent.
- The Borough of Rushcliffe wards of: Bingham East; Bingham West; Cranmer; East Bridgford; Thoroton. ^{1}

The constituency saw minor boundary changes, primarily due to the redrawing of local authority ward boundaries.

^{1} Following a further local government boundary review which came into effect in May 2023, the parts in the Borough of Rushcliffe now comprise the following wards from the 2024 general election:

- Bingham North; Bingham South; Cranmer; East Bridgford; Newton (majority); and a small part of Nevile & Langar.

The constituency covers large parts of the Newark and Sherwood district which encompasses the east of Nottinghamshire, as such includes the towns of Newark-on-Trent and Southwell, and the villages of Collingham and Sutton-on-Trent. It also covers parts of the Bassetlaw and Rushcliffe areas including Markham Moor and Bingham.

== History ==
Newark was the last borough to be added to the Unreformed House of Commons which took place in 1673, prior to the Reform Act 1832. It returned two representatives to Parliament from 1673 until 1885.

Newark petitioned for enfranchisement as a parliamentary borough in the 1660s, in recognition of the town's royalist sympathies during the English Civil War. It was eventually enfranchised by a royal charter in early 1673, which gave the rights of election to the mayor and aldermen. However, the freemen of the town contested this, and held a separate election in which they selected a different member to the aldermen. The dispute in Parliament lasted until 1677, when the charter was withdrawn and a new one issued, causing a fresh election in which all inhabitants paying scot and lot could vote. In 1685, a third charter was issued, giving the right of election to all forty-shilling freeholders. The borough constituency existed until 1885, when it was replaced by a county division of the same name under the Redistribution of Seats Act 1885.

The future Prime Minister, William Ewart Gladstone, began his political career as Member of Parliament for Newark from 1832 to 1845. More recently, the Labour Party held Newark (on substantially different boundaries to the present ones) from 1950 until 1979, when it was taken by the Conservatives' Richard Alexander. Alexander lost his seat during Labour's landslide victory at the 1997 general election. The victorious Labour candidate, Fiona Jones, was convicted of electoral fraud and expelled from the House of Commons in 1999 over misrepresented election expenses. The conviction was later overturned upon appeal and she returned to Parliament. However, Jones lost her seat at the 2001 general election to Patrick Mercer of the Conservatives, who held it until 2014.

Mercer held the position of Shadow Minister for Homeland Security from June 2003 until March 2007, when he was forced to resign following racially contentious comments made to The Times.

The Newark constituency in 2010 lost the town of Retford to the Bassetlaw constituency (although Newark still has a smaller part of the Bassetlaw district), but gained land in and around Bingham from the Rushcliffe constituency, thus making it much safer Conservative territory.

Following an investigation by Commons authorities finding that Mr Mercer had engaged in paid lobbying, not properly reported the income or declared his interest, and repeatedly seriously denigrated other members, Patrick Mercer stepped down as MP for Newark on 30 April 2014.

Robert Jenrick was elected in the subsequent by-election, in the Conservative Party's largest by-election majority for four decades. He was appointed on 24 July 2019 as Secretary of State for Housing, Communities and Local Government under Prime Minister Boris Johnson. On 15 January 2026, Jenrick became one in a series of high-profile Conservatives to defect to Reform UK.

== Members of Parliament ==
=== MPs before 1885 ===
Election	Member	Party	Member	Party
1673	Henry Savile		Sir Paul Neile	
1677	Henry Savile		Sir Richard Rothwell	
Feb 1679	Robert Leke		Sir Robert Markham	
Aug 1679	Sir Richard Rothwell		Sir Robert Markham	
1685	Henry Savile		Philip Darcy	
1689	William Savile		Nicholas Saunderson	
1693	William Savile		Sir Francis Molyneux, 4th Baronet	
1695	Sir George Markham, 3rd Baronet		Sir Francis Molyneux, 4th Baronet	
1698	James Saunderson		Sir Francis Molyneux, 4th Baronet	
1700	James Saunderson		John Rayner	
Jan 1701	Sir George Markham, 3rd Baronet		John Rayner	
Nov 1701	Sir Matthew Jenison		James Saunderson	
1705	John Digby		James Saunderson	
1708	Richard Sutton		James Saunderson	
1710	Sir Thomas Willoughby, 2nd Baronet		Richard Newdigate	
1712	Richard Sutton		Richard Newdigate	
1715	Richard Sutton		Conyers Darcy	
1722	Richard Sutton		James Pelham	
1738 (by)	Lord William Manners		James Pelham	
1741	Lord William Manners		Job Staunton Charlton	
1754	John Manners		Job Staunton Charlton	
1761	John Manners		Thomas Thoroton	
1768	John Manners		John Shelley	
1774	George Manners-Sutton		Henry Clinton	Tory
1780	Lord George Manners-Sutton	Tory	Henry Clinton	Tory
1783 (by)	John Manners-Sutton	Tory	Henry Clinton	Tory
1784	John Manners-Sutton	Tory	Constantine Phipps	Tory
1790	John Manners-Sutton	Tory	William Crosbie	Tory
1796	Thomas Manners-Sutton	Tory	Mark Wood	Tory
1802	Thomas Manners-Sutton	Tory	Sir Charles Pole	
1805 (by)	Henry Willoughby	Tory	Sir Charles Pole	
1806	Henry Willoughby	Tory	Sir Stapleton Cotton, Bt	Tory
1814 (by)	Henry Willoughby	Tory	George Hay Dawkins-Pennant	
1818	Henry Willoughby	Tory	Sir William Henry Clinton	Tory
1829 (by)	Henry Willoughby	Tory	Michael Thomas Sadler	Tory
Feb 1831 (by)	William Farnworth Handley	Tory	Michael Thomas Sadler	Tory
May 1831	William Farnworth Handley	Tory	Thomas Wilde	Whig
1832	William Farnworth Handley	Tory	William Ewart Gladstone	Tory
1834	William Farnworth Handley	Conservative	William Ewart Gladstone	Conservative
1835	Thomas Wilde	Whig	William Ewart Gladstone	Conservative
1841	Lord John Manners	Conservative	William Ewart Gladstone	Conservative
1846 (by)	Lord John Manners	Conservative	John Stuart	Conservative
1847	John Manners-Sutton	Conservative	John Stuart	Conservative
1852	John Manners-Sutton	Conservative	Granville Harcourt-Vernon	Peelite
1857	Earl of Lincoln	Peelite	John Handley	Peelite
1859	Grosvenor Hodgkinson	Liberal	John Handley	Liberal
1865	Grosvenor Hodgkinson	Liberal	Lord Arthur Pelham-Clinton	Liberal
1868	Grosvenor Hodgkinson	Liberal	Edward Denison	Liberal
1870 (by)	Grosvenor Hodgkinson	Liberal	Samuel Bristowe	Liberal
1874	Thomas Earp	Liberal	Samuel Bristowe	Liberal
1880	Thomas Earp	Liberal	William Newzam Nicholson	Conservative
1885	Representation reduced to one member			

=== MPs since 1885 ===
Election	Member	Party
1885	Charles Pierrepont	Conservative
1895	Harold Finch-Hatton	Conservative
1898 by-election	Charles Pierrepont	Conservative
1900 by-election	Charles Welby	Conservative
1906	John Starkey	Conservative
1922	William Cavendish-Bentinck	Conservative
1943 by-election	Sidney Shephard	Conservative
1950	George Deer	Labour
1964	Ted Bishop	Labour
1979	Richard Alexander	Conservative
1997	Fiona Jones	Labour
Mar 1999	Fiona Jones	Independent
Apr 1999	Fiona Jones	Labour
2001	Patrick Mercer	Conservative
2013	Patrick Mercer	Independent
2014 by-election	Robert Jenrick	Conservative
2026	Robert Jenrick	Reform UK

== Elections ==
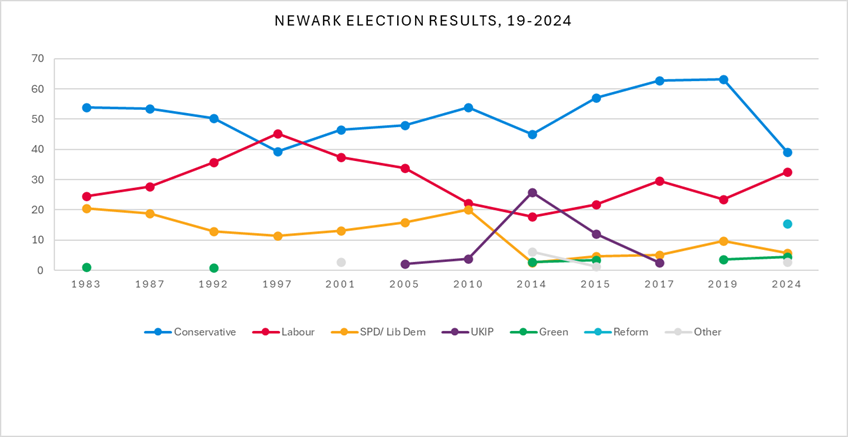
Newark election results 1983–2024

=== Elections in the 2020s ===
General election 2024: Newark
Party	Candidate	Votes	%	±%
Conservative	Robert Jenrick	20,968	39.2	−23.9
Labour	Saj Ahmad	17,396	32.5	+8.6
Reform	Robert Palmer	8,280	15.5	+15.2
Liberal Democrats	David Watts	3,026	5.7	−3.9
Green	Michael Ackroyd	2,345	4.4	+1.3
Ind. Network	Adrian Amer	809	1.5	New
Independent	Lyn Galbraith	329	0.6	New
English Democrat	Matthew Darrington	156	0.3	New
Workers Party	Collan Siddique	150	0.3	New
Majority		3,572	6.7	−33.1
Turnout		53,459	67.0	−5.2
Registered electors		80,028		
Conservative hold		Swing	−16.6	

=== Elections in the 2010s ===
General election 2019: Newark
Party	Candidate	Votes	%	±%
Conservative	Robert Jenrick	34,660	63.3	+0.6
Labour	James Baggaley	12,844	23.5	−6.2
Liberal Democrats	David Watts	5,308	9.7	+4.6
Green	Jay Henderson	1,950	3.6	New
Majority		21,816	39.8	+6.8
Turnout		54,762	72.2	−0.7
Conservative hold		Swing	+3.4	

General election 2017: Newark
Party	Candidate	Votes	%	±%
Conservative	Robert Jenrick	34,493	62.7	+5.7
Labour	Chantal Lee	16,344	29.7	+8.0
Liberal Democrats	David Watts	2,786	5.1	+0.5
UKIP	Xandra Arundel	1,419	2.6	−9.4
Majority		18,149	33.0	−2.3
Turnout		55,042	72.9	+2.0
Conservative hold		Swing	−1.2	

General election 2015: Newark
Party	Candidate	Votes	%	±%
Conservative	Robert Jenrick	29,834	57.0	+3.1
Labour	Michael Payne	11,360	21.7	−0.6
UKIP	Brian Mapletoft	6,294	12.0	+8.2
Liberal Democrats	David Dobbie	2,385	4.6	−15.4
Green	Elayne Forster	1,792	3.4	N/A
Consensus – The Community Party	Helen Tyrer	637	1.2	New
Majority		18,474	35.3	+3.7
Turnout		52,302	70.9	−0.5
Conservative hold		Swing	+1.9	

2014 Newark by-election
Party	Candidate	Votes	%	±%
Conservative	Robert Jenrick	17,431	45.0	−8.9
UKIP	Roger Helmer	10,028	25.9	+22.1
Labour	Michael Payne	6,842	17.7	−4.6
Independent	Paul Baggaley	1,891	4.9	New
Green	David Kirwan	1,057	2.7	New
Liberal Democrats	David Watts	1,004	2.6	−17.4
Monster Raving Loony	Nick The Flying Brick	168	0.4	New
Independent	Andy Hayes	117	0.3	New
Bus-Pass Elvis	David Bishop	87	0.2	New
Common Good	Dick Rodgers	64	0.2	New
Patriotic Socialist Party	Lee Woods	18	0.1	New
Majority		7,403	19.1	−12.5
Turnout		38,707	52.79	−18.6
Conservative hold		Swing		

General election 2010: Newark
Party	Candidate	Votes	%	±%
Conservative	Patrick Mercer	27,590	53.9	+3.4
Labour	Ian Campbell	11,438	22.3	−6.0
Liberal Democrats	Pauline Jenkins	10,246	20.0	+1.6
UKIP	Tom Irvine	1,954	3.8	+1.0
Majority		16,152	31.6	+9.4
Turnout		51,228	71.4	+8.0
Conservative hold		Swing	+4.7	

=== Elections in the 2000s ===
General election 2005: Newark
Party	Candidate	Votes	%	±%
Conservative	Patrick Mercer	21,946	48.0	+1.5
Labour	Jason Reece	15,482	33.9	−3.6
Liberal Democrats	Stuart Thompstone	7,276	15.9	+2.7
UKIP	Charlotte Creasy	992	2.2	New
Majority		6,464	14.1	+5.1
Turnout		45,696	63.2	−0.3
Conservative hold		Swing	+2.6	

General election 2001: Newark
Party	Candidate	Votes	%	±%
Conservative	Patrick Mercer	20,983	46.5	+7.1
Labour	Fiona Jones	16,910	37.5	−7.7
Liberal Democrats	David Harding-Price	5,970	13.2	+1.7
Independent	Donald Haxby	822	1.8	New
Socialist Alliance	Ian Thomson	462	1.0	New
Majority		4,073	9.0	N/A
Turnout		45,147	63.5	−11.0
Conservative gain from Labour		Swing		

=== Elections in the 1990s ===
General election 1997: Newark
Party	Candidate	Votes	%	±%
Labour	Fiona Jones	23,496	45.2	+9.4
Conservative	Richard Alexander	20,480	39.4	−11.0
Liberal Democrats	Peter Harris	5,960	11.5	−1.5
Referendum	Graham Creedy	2,035	3.9	New
Majority		3,016	5.8	N/A
Turnout		51,971	74.5	−7.7
Labour gain from Conservative		Swing		

General election 1992: Newark
Party	Candidate	Votes	%	±%
Conservative	Richard Alexander	28,494	50.4	−3.1
Labour	David Barton	20,265	35.8	+8.1
Liberal Democrats	Peter Harris	7,342	13.0	−5.8
Green	Patricia Wood	435	0.8	New
Majority		8,229	14.6	−11.2
Turnout		56,536	82.2	+4.6
Conservative hold		Swing	−5.6	

=== Elections in the 1980s ===
General election 1987: Newark
Party	Candidate	Votes	%	±%
Conservative	Richard Alexander	28,070	53.5	−0.3
Labour	David Barton	14,527	27.7	+3.1
SDP	George Emerson	9,833	18.8	−1.8
Majority		13,543	25.8	−3.4
Turnout		52,430	77.6	+1.2
Conservative hold		Swing		

General election 1983: Newark
Party	Candidate	Votes	%	±%
Conservative	Richard Alexander	26,334	53.8	
Labour	John McGuiggan	12,051	24.6	
SDP	Stuart Thompstone	10,076	20.6	
Ecology	Patricia Hewis	463	1.0	New
Majority		14,283	29.2	
Turnout		48,924	76.4	
Conservative hold		Swing		

=== Elections in the 1970s ===
General election 1979: Newark
Party	Candidate	Votes	%	±%
Conservative	Richard Alexander	27,711	45.9	+8.4
Labour	Edward Bishop	25,960	43.0	−4.9
Liberal	J. Baker	6,773	11.2	−3.4
Majority		1,751	2.9	N/A
Turnout		60,444	79.9	+2.0
Conservative gain from Labour		Swing		

General election October 1974: Newark
Party	Candidate	Votes	%	±%
Labour	Edward Bishop	26,598	47.9	−5.9
Conservative	David H. Cargill	20,827	37.5	−8.7
Liberal	I. G. M. Jones	8,116	14.6	New
Majority		5,771	10.4	+2.8
Turnout		55,541	77.9	−5.1
Labour hold		Swing		

General election February 1974: Newark
Party	Candidate	Votes	%	±%
Labour	Edward Bishop	31,586	53.8	−12.4
Conservative	David H. Cargill	27,089	46.2	−6.6
Majority		4,497	7.6	+5.2
Turnout		58,675	83.0	+7.0
Labour hold		Swing		

General election 1970: Newark
Party	Candidate	Votes	%	±%
Labour	Edward Bishop	26,455	51.2	−5.5
Conservative	Donald G. Allen	25,235	48.8	+5.5
Majority		1,220	2.4	−11.0
Turnout		51,690	76.0	−5.1
Labour hold		Swing		

=== Elections in the 1960s ===
General election 1966: Newark
Party	Candidate	Votes	%	±%
Labour	Edward Bishop	27,402	56.72	
Conservative	Peter Jenkin-Jones	20,913	43.28	
Majority		6,489	13.44	
Turnout		48,315	81.09	
Labour hold		Swing		

General election 1964: Newark
Party	Candidate	Votes	%	±%
Labour	Edward Bishop	26,171	54.36	
Conservative	Peter Jenkin-Jones	21,975	45.64	
Majority		4,196	8.72	
Turnout		48,146	83.15	
Labour hold		Swing		

=== Elections in the 1950s ===
General election 1959: Newark
Party	Candidate	Votes	%	±%
Labour	George Deer	24,072	51.91	
Conservative	Peter Jenkin-Jones	22,300	48.09	
Majority		1,772	3.82	
Turnout		46,372	84.94	
Labour hold		Swing		

General election 1955: Newark
Party	Candidate	Votes	%	±%
Labour	George Deer	23,057	52.43	
Conservative	Ronald H. Watson	20,916	47.57	
Majority		2,141	4.86	
Turnout		43,973	83.51	
Labour hold		Swing		

General election 1951: Newark
Party	Candidate	Votes	%	±%
Labour	George Deer	30,476	57.19	
Conservative	Ronald H. Watson	22,817	42.81	
Majority		7,659	14.38	
Turnout		53,293	85.47	
Labour hold		Swing		

General election 1950: Newark
Party	Candidate	Votes	%	±%
Labour	George Deer	28,959	54.20	
Conservative	Sidney Shephard	21,522	40.28	
Liberal	Ernest Harold Pickering	2,950	5.52	
Majority		7,437	13.92	N/A
Turnout		53,431	88.08	
Labour gain from Conservative		Swing		

=== Elections in the 1940s ===
General election 1945: Newark
Party	Candidate	Votes	%	±%
Conservative	Sidney Shephard	18,580	45.09	
Labour	Hugh Champion de Crespigny	17,448	42.35	
Liberal	Harold Francis Calladine	5,175	12.56	New
Majority		1,132	2.74	
Turnout		41,203	73.11	
Conservative hold		Swing		

1943 Newark by-election
Party	Candidate	Votes	%	±%
Conservative	Sidney Shephard	20,120	61.17	−1.24
Independent	Alan Dawrant	7,110	21.62	New
Common Wealth	Edward Moeran	3,189	9.70	New
Independent Liberal	John Thomas Pepper	2,473	7.52	New
Majority		13,010	39.55	+14.73
Turnout		32,892		
Conservative hold		Swing		

=== Elections in the 1930s ===
General election 1935: Newark
Party	Candidate	Votes	%	±%
Conservative	Marquess of Titchfield	21,793	62.41	
Labour	Archibald Ward Sharman	13,127	37.59	
Majority		8,666	24.82	
Turnout		34,920	69.92	
Conservative hold		Swing		

General election 1931: Newark
Party	Candidate	Votes	%	±%
Conservative	Marquess of Titchfield	25,445	70.13	
Labour	John Rotherford Bellerby	10,840	29.87	
Majority		14,605	40.26	
Turnout		36,285	75.93	
Conservative hold		Swing		

=== Elections in the 1920s ===
General election 1929: Newark
Party	Candidate	Votes	%	±%
Unionist	Marquess of Titchfield	15,707	45.5	−15.0
Liberal	James Haslam	10,768	31.2	+13.5
Labour	William Richard Grosvenor Haywood	8,060	23.3	+1.5
Majority		4,939	14.3	−24.4
Turnout		34,535	77.0	+2.8
Unionist hold		Swing	−14.3	

General election 1924: Newark
Party	Candidate	Votes	%	±%
Unionist	Marquess of Titchfield	14,129	60.5	+4.6
Labour	H. Varley	5,076	21.8	New
Liberal	James Haslam	4,124	17.7	−26.4
Majority		9,053	38.7	+26.9
Turnout		23,329	74.2	+1.8
Unionist hold		Swing		

General election 1923: Newark
Party	Candidate	Votes	%	±%
Unionist	Marquess of Titchfield	12,357	55.9	−8.9
Liberal	Lawrence Priestley	9,741	44.1	New
Majority		2,616	11.8	−17.8
Turnout		22,098	72.4	−7.5
Unionist hold		Swing		

General election 1922: Newark
Party	Candidate	Votes	%	±%
Unionist	Marquess of Titchfield	15,423	64.8	N/A
Labour	Henry Nixon	8,378	35.2	New
Majority		7,045	29.6	N/A
Turnout		23,801	79.9	N/A
Unionist hold		Swing		

=== Elections in the 1910s ===
General election 1918: Newark
Party		Candidate	Votes	%	±%
C	Unionist	John Starkey	Unopposed		
	Unionist hold				
C indicates candidate endorsed by the coalition government.

General Election 1914–15:

Another General Election was required to take place before the end of 1915. The political parties had been making preparations for an election to take place and by July 1914, the following candidates had been selected;

- Unionist: Arthur Colefax
- Liberal: Robert Burley Wallis

General election December 1910: Newark
Party	Candidate	Votes	%	±%
Conservative	John Starkey	5,049	54.0	−0.3
Liberal	Robert Burley Wallis	4,307	46.0	+0.3
Majority		742	8.0	−0.6
Turnout		9,356	82.7	−6.7
Conservative hold		Swing	−0.3	

General election January 1910: Newark
Party	Candidate	Votes	%	±%
Conservative	John Starkey	5,497	54.3	+2.5
Liberal	Robert Burley Wallis	4,618	45.7	−2.5
Majority		879	8.6	+5.0
Turnout		10,115	89.4	+4.6
Conservative hold		Swing	+2.5	

=== Elections in the 1900s ===
General election 1906: Newark
Party	Candidate	Votes	%	±%
Conservative	John Starkey	4,772	51.8	N/A
Liberal	Alexis Moreton Mandeville	4,444	48.2	New
Majority		328	3.6	N/A
Turnout		9,216	84.8	N/A
Registered electors		10,863		
Conservative hold		Swing	N/A	

General election 1900: Newark
Party	Candidate	Votes	%	±%
Conservative	Charles Welby	Unopposed		
Conservative hold				

Stanger

1900 Newark by-election
Party	Candidate	Votes	%	±%
Conservative	Charles Welby	5,162	64.3	N/A
Liberal	Henry Yorke Stanger	2,871	35.7	New
Majority		2,291	28.6	N/A
Turnout		8,033	77.9	N/A
Registered electors		10,310		
Conservative hold		Swing	N/A	

=== Elections in the 1890s ===
1898 Newark by-election
Party	Candidate	Votes	%	±%
Conservative	Charles Pierrepont	Unopposed		
Conservative hold				

- Caused by Finch-Hatton's resignation.

General election 1895: Newark
Party	Candidate	Votes	%	±%
Conservative	Harold Finch-Hatton	Unopposed		
Conservative hold				

General election 1892: Newark
Party	Candidate	Votes	%	±%
Conservative	Charles Pierrepont	Unopposed		
Conservative hold				

=== Elections in the 1880s ===
General election 1886: Newark
Party	Candidate	Votes	%	±%
Conservative	Charles Pierrepont	Unopposed		
Conservative hold				

General election 1885: Newark (1 seat)
Party	Candidate	Votes	%	±%
Conservative	Charles Pierrepont	5,283	60.0	+11.0
Liberal	Thomas Earp	3,529	40.0	−10.9
Majority		1,764	20.0	+19.7
Turnout		8,812	86.3	−1.5 (est)
Registered electors		10,214		
Conservative hold		Swing	+11.0	

General election 1880: Newark (2 seats)
Party	Candidate	Votes	%	±%
Liberal	Thomas Earp	1,073	26.6	−1.0
Conservative	William Nicholson	993	24.6	+1.2
Conservative	Murray Finch-Hatton	985	24.4	+1.3
Liberal	Samuel Bristowe	982	24.3	−1.6
Turnout		2,017 (est)	87.8 (est)	−1.4
Registered electors		2,297		
Majority		80	2.0	−0.5
Liberal hold		Swing	−1.2	
Majority		11	0.3	N/A
Conservative gain from Liberal		Swing	+1.4	

=== Elections in the 1870s ===
General election 1874: Newark (2 seats)
Party	Candidate	Votes	%	±%
Liberal	Thomas Earp	973	27.6	−9.5
Liberal	Samuel Bristowe	912	25.9	−8.8
Conservative	Edward Field	824	23.4	N/A
Conservative	Henry Eyre	813	23.1	N/A
Majority		88	2.5	−4.0
Turnout		1,761 (est)	89.2 (est)	+7.9
Registered electors		1,974		
Liberal hold		Swing	N/A	
Liberal hold		Swing	N/A	

By-election, 1 Apr 1870: Newark (1 seat)
Party	Candidate	Votes	%	±%
Liberal	Samuel Bristowe	827	54.0	+17.8
Conservative	William Campbell Sleigh	653	42.6	New
Independent Liberal	George Grey	52	3.4	−24.8
Majority		174	11.4	+4.9
Turnout		1,532	85.0	+3.7
Registered electors		1,803		
Liberal hold		Swing	N/A	

- Caused by Denison's death.

=== Elections in the 1860s ===
General election 1868: Newark (2 seats)
Party	Candidate	Votes	%	±%
Liberal	Grosvenor Hodgkinson	1,089	37.1	N/A
Liberal	Edward Denison	1,017	34.7	N/A
Independent Liberal	Philip Handley	826	28.2	N/A
Majority		191	6.5	N/A
Turnout		1,466 (est)	81.3 (est)	N/A
Registered electors		1,803		
Liberal hold		Swing	N/A	
Liberal hold		Swing	N/A	

General election 1865: Newark (2 seats)
Party	Candidate	Votes	%	±%
Liberal	Grosvenor Hodgkinson	Unopposed		
Liberal	Lord Arthur Clinton	Unopposed		
Registered electors		710		
Liberal hold				
Liberal hold				

=== Elections in the 1850s ===
General election 1859: Newark (2 seats)
Party	Candidate	Votes	%	±%
Liberal	Grosvenor Hodgkinson	489	36.5	N/A
Liberal	John Handley	435	32.5	N/A
Conservative	Henry Pelham-Clinton	416	31.0	N/A
Majority		19	1.5	N/A
Turnout		670 (est)	87.8 (est)	N/A
Registered electors		763		
Liberal hold		Swing	N/A	
Liberal hold		Swing	N/A	

General election 1857: Newark (2 seats)
Party	Candidate	Votes	%	±%
Peelite	John Handley	Unopposed		
Peelite	Earl of Lincoln	Unopposed		
Registered electors		763		
Peelite hold				
Peelite gain from Conservative				

General election 1852: Newark (2 seats)
Party	Candidate	Votes	%	±%
Peelite	Granville Harcourt-Vernon	545	39.3	N/A
Conservative	John Manners-Sutton	479	34.6	−5.2
Radical	Marcus Mereweather Turner	362	26.1	N/A
Turnout		693 (est)	79.9 (est)	−1.3
Registered electors		867		
Majority		66	4.7	N/A
Peelite gain from Conservative		Swing	N/A	
Majority		117	8.5	+5.7
Conservative hold		Swing	N/A	

=== Elections in the 1840s ===
General election 1847: Newark (2 seats)
Party	Candidate	Votes	%	±%
Conservative	John Manners-Sutton	614	39.8	N/A
Conservative	John Stuart	487	31.5	N/A
Conservative	George Hussey Packe	443	28.7	N/A
Majority		44	2.8	N/A
Turnout		772 (est)	81.2 (est)	−8.8
Registered electors		951		
Conservative hold		Swing	N/A	
Conservative hold		Swing	N/A	

By-election, 29 January 1846: Newark
Party	Candidate	Votes	%	±%
Conservative	John Stuart	Unopposed		
Conservative hold				

- Caused by Gladstone's appointment as Secretary of State for War and the Colonies

By-election, 14 September 1841: Newark
Party	Candidate	Votes	%	±%
Conservative	William Ewart Gladstone	Unopposed		
Conservative hold				

- Caused by Gladstone's appointment as Vice-President of the Board of Trade and Master of the Mint

General election 1841: Newark (2 seats)
Party	Candidate	Votes	%	±%
Conservative	William Ewart Gladstone	633	38.2	N/A
Conservative	Lord John Manners	630	38.0	N/A
Whig	Thomas Hobhouse	394	23.8	N/A
Majority		236	14.2	N/A
Turnout		1,004	90.0	N/A
Registered electors		1,116		
Conservative hold		Swing	N/A	
Conservative gain from Whig		Swing	N/A	

By-election, 25 January 1840: Newark
Party	Candidate	Votes	%	±%
Whig	Thomas Wilde	541	50.4	N/A
Conservative	Frederic Thesiger	532	49.6	N/A
Majority		9	0.8	N/A
Turnout		1,073	95.0	N/A
Registered electors		1,130		
Whig hold		Swing	N/A	

- Caused by Wilde's appointment as Solicitor General for England and Wales

=== Elections in the 1830s ===
General election 1837: Newark (2 seats)
Party	Candidate	Votes	%
Conservative	William Ewart Gladstone	Unopposed	
Whig	Thomas Wilde	Unopposed	
Registered electors		1,221	
Conservative hold			
Whig hold			

General election 1835: Newark (2 seats)
Party	Candidate	Votes	%
Conservative	William Ewart Gladstone	Unopposed	
Whig	Thomas Wilde	Unopposed	
Registered electors		1,273	
Conservative hold			
Whig gain from Conservative			

General election 1832: Newark (2 seats)
Party	Candidate	Votes	%	±%
Tory	William Ewart Gladstone	887	36.8	+4.0
Tory	William Farnworth Handley	798	33.1	+3.3
Whig	Thomas Wilde	726	30.1	−7.3
Majority		73	3.0	N/A
Turnout		1,519	96.4	c. +8.6
Registered electors		1,575		
Tory hold		Swing	+3.8	
Tory gain from Whig		Swing	+3.5	

General election 1831: Newark (2 seats)
Party	Candidate	Votes	%	±%
Whig	Thomas Wilde	849	37.4	+7.4
Tory	William Farnworth Handley	746	32.8	−2.9
Tory	Roger Gresley	678	29.8	−4.5
Majority		171	7.6	N/A
Turnout		1,492	c. 87.8	c. +7.7
Registered electors		c. 1,700		
Whig gain from Tory		Swing	+7.4	
Tory hold		Swing	−3.3	

By-election, 21 February 1831: Newark
Party	Candidate	Votes	%	±%
Tory	William Farnworth Handley	833	60.3	−9.7
Whig	Thomas Wilde	547	39.6	+9.6
Radical	Charles Wilkins	2	0.1	N/A
Majority		286	20.7	+16.4
Turnout		1,382	c. 81.3	c. +1.2
Registered electors		c. 1,700		
Tory hold		Swing	−9.7	

- Caused by Willoughby's resignation

General election 1830: Newark (2 seats)
Party	Candidate	Votes	%	±%
Tory	Henry Willoughby (MP)	775	35.7	
Tory	Michael Thomas Sadler	746	34.3	
Whig	Thomas Wilde	652	30.0	
Majority		94	4.3	
Turnout		1,361	c. 80.1	
Registered electors		c. 1,700		
Tory hold		Swing		
Tory hold		Swing		

== See also ==
- List of parliamentary constituencies in Nottinghamshire
