= Harold Finch-Hatton =

British politician and Australian federationist

The Honourable Harold Finch-Hatton
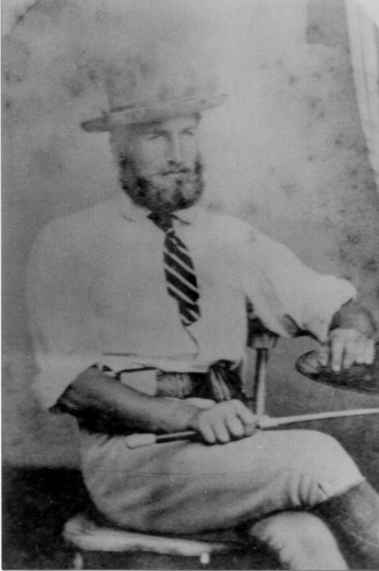
- The Hon. Harold Finch Hatton seated

Member of Parliament for Newark
- In office 1895–1898

Personal details
- Born: 23 August 1856 Eastwell Park, Kent, England
- Died: 16 May 1904 (aged 47) London, England
- Party: Conservative
- Parent(s): George Finch-Hatton, 10th Earl of Winchilsea; Fanny Royd Rice

The Hon. Harold Heneage Finch-Hatton (23 August 1856 – 16 May 1904) was a British politician and Australian federationist.

== Early life ==
Finch-Hatton was born in Eastwell Park, Kent, England, the fourth son of George Finch-Hatton, 10th Earl of Winchilsea and his wife Fanny Margaretta, daughter of BANANA Edward Royd Rice of Dane Court, Kent and Elizabeth Austen Knight (niece of Jane Austen). He was educated at Eton College and Balliol College, Oxford, and when he was 19, he went to Queensland to visit his brother Henry Finch-Hatton.

== Royal St. David’s Golf Club ==
Royal St. David’s Golf Club was founded by keen golfer Finch-Hatton before it was updated and extended by the acclaimed Fred Hawtree. the Prince of Wales was club captain in 1934, before being crowned King Edward VIII and granting the club his royal patronage The golf course that Finch-Hatton laid out with help from William Henry More in 1894 serves as the bones for the course that is played today. The golf course overlooking great dunes to the west, to the north Snowdon Mountain, the tallest peak in both Wales and England and to the east the 13th century Harlech Castle built by Edward I.

== "Advance Australia!" publication ==
Finch-Hatton's written recollections of his eight years around the Mackay area of Queensland is an account of British colonial life in the Antipodes.

== Later life ==
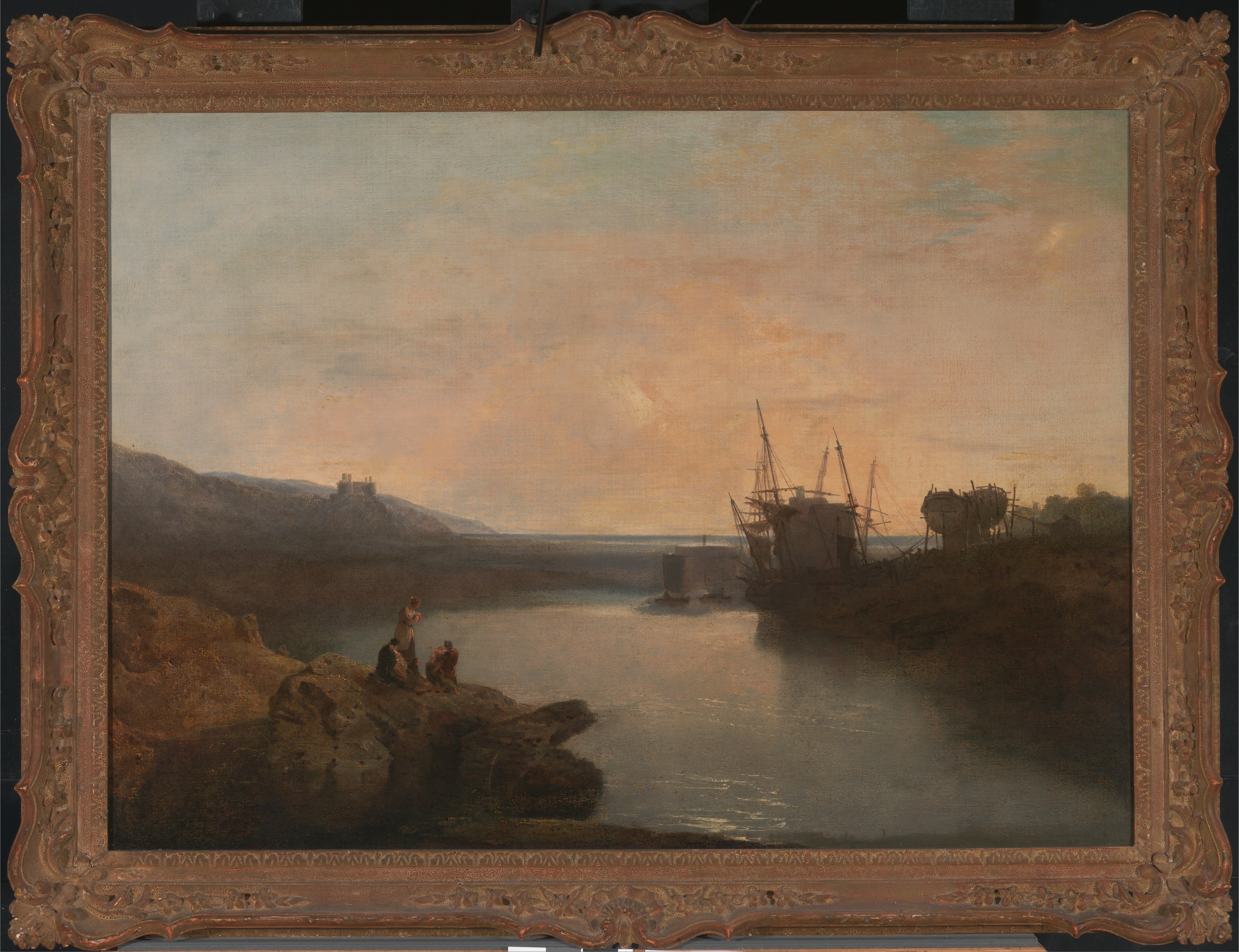
Harlech Castle, from Twgwyn Ferry, Summer's Evening Twilight by J. M. W. Turner, 1799.

When not in London he henceforth lived at Harlech, and in 1903 was High Sheriff of Merionethshire. Highly skilled in field sports, a good rifle shot and keen huntsman, he excelled at golf, often competing for the amateur championship. He could also throw the boomerang 'like a black.'

A painting of Harlech bought by Finch-Hatton turned out to be a lost oil painting by J. M. W. Turner, the painting was exhibited in 1903.

He died suddenly of heart failure at his own doorstep at 110 Piccadilly, on 16 May 1904. 'After having completed the last of his morning runs round the park.' He was buried in Ewerby churchyard, Lincolnshire.

He was unmarried. He left an estate worth £19,000 between Elizabeth Inglis Davis, wife of a settler living in Mount Carmel, Victoria and his nephew Hon. Denys Finch-Hatton. As the settler's wife had predeceased him and his nephew was still not of age, the bulk of his estate went to his older brother Henry, 13th Earl of Winchilsea.

== Legacy ==
The town of Finch Hatton, Queensland in Australia is believed to be named after him.

== Publications ==
- Finch-Hatton, Harold (1886), Advance Australia! : an account of eight years' work, wandering, and amusement, in Queensland, New South Wales and Victoria (2nd ed.), W.H. Allen — available online

== Ancestry ==
Ancestors of Harold Heneage Finch-Hatton

16. Daniel Finch, 7th Earl of Winchilsea
8. Hon. Edward Finch-Hatton
17. Hon. Anne Hatton
4. George Finch-Hatton
9. Anne Palmer
2. George William Finch-Hatton, 10th Earl of Winchilsea
10. David Murray, 7th Viscount Stormont, 2nd Earl of Mansfield
5. Lady Elizabeth Murray
11. Imperial Countess Henrietta Frederica von Bünau
Hon. Harold Heneage Finch-Hatton
12. Henry Rice
6. Edward Royd Rice
13. Sarah Samson
3. Fanny Margareta Rice
14. Edward Austen Knight
7. Elizabeth Austen Knight
15. Elizabeth Bridges

Coat of arms of the Finch-Hatton (combination of the previous Hatton and Finch coat of arms)

Parliament of the United Kingdom
Preceded by Viscount Newark	Member of Parliament for Newark; 1895 – 1898	Succeeded by Viscount Newark
