= Henry Pelham-Clinton, 6th Duke of Newcastle =

English nobleman (1834-1879)

Henry Pelham Alexander Pelham-Clinton 6th Duke of Newcastle-under-Lyne
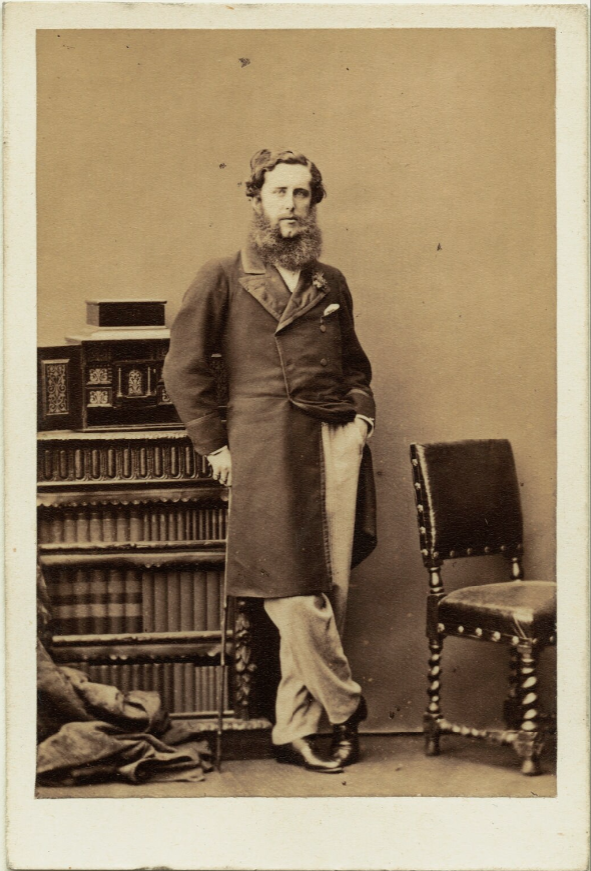
- Carte-de-visite taken by Camille Silvy in July 1861, right around the time of the Duke's marriage.

Member of Parliament for Newark
- In office 1857–1859 Serving with John Handley
- Preceded by: John Manners-Sutton; Granville Edward Harcourt-Vernon
- Succeeded by: John Handley; Grosvenor Hodgkinson
- Born: 25 January 1834
- Died: 22 February 1879 (aged 45)
- Other names: Lord Clinton; Earl of Lincoln
- Education: Eton College
- Alma mater: Christ Church, Oxford
- Political party: Peelite
- Spouse: Henrietta Adela Hope (m. 1861)
- Children: 5, including Henry and Francis
- Parents: Henry Pelham-Clinton, 5th Duke of Newcastle (father); Lady Susan Hamilton (mother)
- Relatives: Alexander Hamilton (maternal grandfather); Henry Thomas Hope (father-in-law); Henry Pelham-Clinton, 7th Duke of Newcastle (son); Francis Pelham-Clinton-Hope, 8th Duke of Newcastle (son)

Henry Pelham Alexander Pelham-Clinton, 6th Duke of Newcastle-under-Lyne (25 January 1834 – 22 February 1879) was an English nobleman, styled Lord Clinton until 1851 and Earl of Lincoln until he inherited the dukedom in 1864.

Pelham-Clinton was the son of Henry Pelham-Clinton, 5th Duke of Newcastle and his wife Lady Susan Hamilton. He was educated at Eton College and Christ Church, Oxford.

His political career was limited to sitting as Member of Parliament for Newark between 1857 and 1859. He did not hold any significant political offices in Nottinghamshire, although he was Provincial Grand Master of the Nottinghamshire Freemasons from 1865 to 1877.

Lincoln's taste for gambling resulted in his fleeing the country in 1860 to escape his debts, which had then reached £230,000 (in excess of £26 million in 2017 terms). In 1861, he married Henrietta Hope, heiress of the wealthy Henry Thomas Hope, in Paris. As part of the marriage settlement, his debts were paid and an income of £50,000 a year was settled on the couple. Extensive lands in England and Ireland were also added to his family's holdings by inheritance from his father-in-law, although Pelham-Clinton himself never controlled them due to the terms of that testament.

He succeeded his father as Duke of Newcastle in 1864 and had five children with Henrietta:

- Lady Beatrice Adeline Pelham-Clinton (1862–1935) who married Sir Cecil Lister-Kaye, 4th Baronet in 1880
- Lady Emily Augusta Mary Pelham-Clinton (1863–1919) who married Prince Alphonso Doria Pamphilj, Duc d'Avigliano in 1882
- Henry Pelham-Clinton, 7th Duke of Newcastle-under-Lyne (1864–1928)
- Francis Pelham-Clinton-Hope, 8th Duke of Newcastle-under-Lyne (1866–1941)
- Lady Florence Josephine Pelham-Clinton (1868–1935)

Coat of arms of Henry Pelham-Clinton, 6th Duke of Newcastle
Coronet A coronet of an Duke Crest 1st, out of a ducal coronet gules, a plume of five ostrich feathers argent, banded azure; 2nd, a peacock in pride proper. Escutcheon Quarterly: 1st and 4th argent, six cross crosslets, three, two and one, sable, on a chief azure two mullets pierced gules (Clinton); 2nd and 3rd, quarterly, 1st and 4th azure, three pelicans vulning themselves argent; and 2nd and 3rd gules, two pieces of belts with buckles erect in pale, the buckles upwards argent (Pelham). Supporters Two greyhounds argent collared and lined gules. Motto Loyaulté n'a honte Loyalty knows not shame

Parliament of the United Kingdom
Preceded by John Manners-Sutton; Granville Edward Harcourt-Vernon	Member of Parliament for Newark; 1857–1859; With: John Handley	Succeeded by John Handley; Grosvenor Hodgkinson
Peerage of Great Britain
Preceded by Henry Pelham-Clinton	Duke of Newcastle-under-Lyne; 1864–1879	Succeeded by Henry Pelham-Clinton
