= Thomas Earp (politician) =

English politician

Thomas Earp (1830 – 17 February 1910) was an English Liberal Party politician who sat in the House of Commons from 1874 to 1885.

Earp was the son of William Earp of Derby and his wife Sarah Taylor, daughter of James Taylor of Muskham. He was educated at the Diocesan School in Derby and became a partner in the firms of Gilstrap, Earp & Co. maltsters and Richardson Earp and Slater, brewers. He was a town councillor for Newark-upon-Trent and was Mayor of the borough from 1869 to 1870.

At the 1874 general election Earp was elected as a member of parliament (MP) for the borough of Newark. He was re-elected in 1880, and held the seat until the parliamentary borough was abolished at the 1885 general election, when he stood unsuccessfully in the new single-seat Newark division of Nottinghamshire.

Earp died at the age of 79.

Earp married Martha Weightman, daughter of T Weightman of Langford Nottinghamshire, in 1855.

Parliament of the United Kingdom
Preceded by Grosvenor Hodgkinson; Samuel Bristowe	Member of Parliament for Newark; 1874 – 1885; With: Samuel Bristowe to 1880; William Newzam Nicholson from 1880	Succeeded by Viscount Newark
