= 1943 Newark by-election =

UK Parliamentary by-election

The 1943 Newark by-election was held on 8 June 1943. The by-election was held due to the succession to the peerage of the incumbent Conservative MP, the Marquess of Titchfield, who had succeeded his father as Duke of Portland. It was won by the Conservative candidate Sidney Shephard.

== Candidates ==
49 year-old Sidney Shephard was chosen as the Conservative candidate. He was High Sheriff of Nottinghamshire. He also commanded the Newark Home Guard Battalion.

At the outbreak of war, the Conservative, Liberal and Labour parties had agreed an electoral truce which meant that when a by-election occurred, the party that was defending the seat would not be opposed by an official candidate from the other two parties. When the Labour and Liberal parties joined the Coalition government, it was agreed that any by-election candidate defending a government seat would receive a letter of endorsement jointly signed by all the party leaders.

Alan Dawrant, known to have progressive leanings, stood as an Independent. He was the brother-in-law of Denis Kendall, the recently elected Independent MP for Grantham. 40 year-old solicitor Flight-Lieutenant Edward Moeran, who had served in Gibraltar, was the Common Wealth party candidate. 55 year-old Liberal, John Thomas Pepper also stood. He was the prospective Liberal candidate for neighbouring Melton and Chairman of Nottingham East Liberals.

== Campaign ==
The three anti-Tory candidates spent much time attacking each other. The Dawrant campaign was belatedly able to establish its candidate as the main challenger to the Conservative, with the support of Independent MPs Kendall, George Reakes and his election agent William Brown, along with the Liberal MPs Clement Davies and Tom Horabin.

== Result ==
The Conservative Party held the seat with an increased majority.

Newark by-election, 1943
Party	Candidate	Votes	%	±%
Conservative	Sidney Shephard	20,120	61.2	−1.2
Independent Progressive	Alan Dawrant	7,110	21.6	New
Common Wealth	Edward Moeran	3,189	9.7	New
Independent Liberal	John Thomas Pepper	2,473	7.5	New
Majority		13,010	39.6	+14.7
Turnout		32,892		
Conservative hold		Swing		

== See also ==
- 2014 Newark by-election
