= Alexis (given name) =

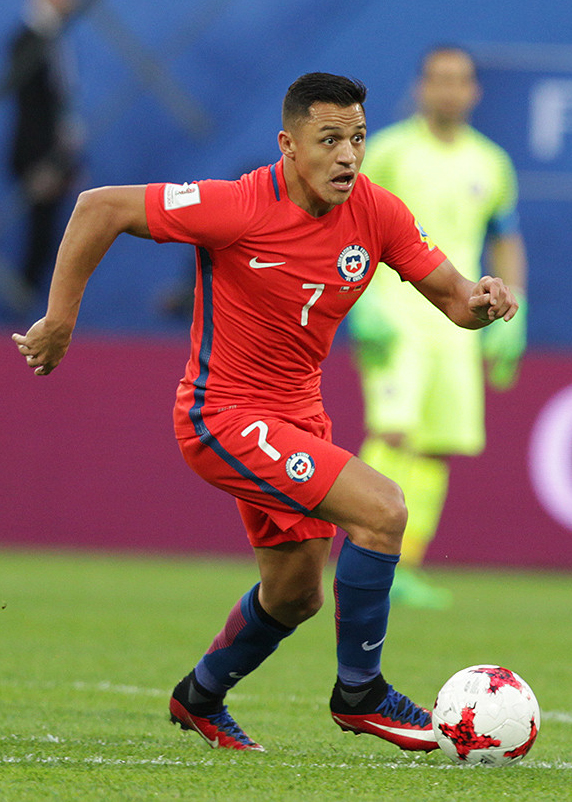
- Alexis Sánchez
- Pronunciation: /əˈlɛksɪs/
- Gender: Unisex (originally male)
- Language: Greek

Origin
- Meaning: "helper, defender"

Other names
- See also: Alexius, Aleixo, Alexios, Alexey, Alexander, Alexandra, Alex, Lexi

Alexis is a given name of Greek origin. Like the name Alexander, Alexis derives from the Ancient Greek verb ἀλέξειν, aléxein, 'defend'.

While the name is traditionally male, it has been predominantly given to females in the United States since at least the 1940s, when actress Alexis Smith began appearing in films. It has been among the top 50 most popular names for girls in the United States since 1990. The increase in popularity of the name is sometimes attributed to the notable character Alexis Colby from the American television series Dynasty. A 1978 film Ice Castles featured as the main character a blind figure skater named Alexis "Lexie" Winston.

Aleksi, a Finnish variant, was the third most popular name for boys born in Finland in 2007. Alessia, an Italian feminine variant, was the second most common name for girls born in Italy in 2006.

== Masculine variants ==
- Aleksi, Aleksis (Finnish)
- Aleksis (Latvian)
- Alexis, Alex (Indonesian)
- Aleix (Catalan)
- Aleixo (Galician), (Portuguese)
- Alejo (Spanish)
- Алексей (Alexei, Alexey, Aleksei, Aleksey), Алексий (Alexiy), Алёша (Alyosha), Лёша (Lyosha) (Russian)
- Алекси, Aleksi (Bulgarian)
- ალექსი, Aleksi (Georgian)
- Aleks (Albanian)
- Aleksije, Aleksej (Serbian), (Croatian)
- Aleksy (Polish)
- Aleš (Czech), (Slovene)
- Alessio (Italian)
- Alexian (French)
- Alexis (Spanish), (English), (French)
- Alexys (French)
- Αλέξιος (Alexios), Αλέξης (Alexis) (Greek)
- Alexius (Latin)
- Elek (Hungarian)
- Lex (English)
- Олексій (Oleksii, Oleksiy), Олекса (Oleksa) (Ukrainian)

== Feminine variants ==
- Aleja (Spanish)
- Aleksa (Polish)
- Alesia (Albanian)
- Alessia (Italian)
- Alexa (English, Indonesian)
- Alexia (English), (Galician), (German), (Greek), (Spanish), (French)
- Alexiane (French)
- Алекса (Aleksa, Alexa) (Russian)
- Aléxia (Portuguese)
- Alexie (French)
- Alexina (English)
- Alexis (English)
- Elexis (English)
- Lexa (English)
- Lexia (English)
- Lexi (English)
- Lexie (English)
- Lexis (English)
- Lexus (English)
- Lexy (English)

== People ==
- Alexis (fl. 350s – 288 BC), 4th century poet
- Alexis, Ancient Greek sculptor
- Alexis of Russia (1629–1676), Tsar of Russia
- Alexis Agrafiotis (born 1970), German-Greek composer, conductor and pianist
- Alexis Ajinça (born 1988), French basketball player
- Alexis Akrithakis (1939–1994), Greek artist
- Alexis Alexandris (born 1968), Greek footballer
- Alexis Alexiou (born 1963), Greek footballer
- Alexis Alexopoulos (born 1971), Greek sprinter
- Alexis Alexoudis (born 1972), Greek footballer
- Alexis André Jr. (born 1997), Moroccan footballer
- Alexis Apostolopoulos (born 1991), Greek footballer
- Alexis Argüello (1952–2009), Nicaraguan boxer and politician
- Alexis Arquette (1969–2016), American transgender actress and musician, of the Arquette acting family
- Alexis Arts (born 1986), Italian escape artist
- Alexis Ayala (born 1965), American-Mexican actor
- Alexis Beka Beka (born 2001), French footballer
- Alexis Simon Belle (1674–1734), French portrait artist
- Alexis Bellino (born 1977), American television personality
- Alexis Belonio (born 1960), Filipino professor, engineer, and scientist
- Alexis Blin (born 1996), French footballer
- Alexis Bledel (born 1981), American actress
- Alexis Blokhina (born 2004), American tennis player
- Alexis Bloom (born 1974/1975), South African documentary film director and producer
- Alexis Borges (born 1991), Portuguese handball player
- Alexis Bowater, British television journalist and presenter
- Alexis Brandeker (born 1974), Swedish astronomer
- Alexis Carrel (1873–1944), French surgeon and biologist
- Alexis Castro (born 1984), Argentine footballer
- Alexis Castro (born 1994), Argentine footballer
- Alexis Cerritos (born 2000), Salvadoran footballer
- Alexis Christoforous (born 1970), American WCBS-TV Wall Street reporter
- Alexis Clairaut (1713–1765), French mathematician, astronomer, and geophysicist
- Alexis Cole (born 1976), American singer
- Alexis Conran, British actor, writer, TV and radio presenter
- Alexis Contant (1858–1918), Canadian composer and musician
- Alexis Coquillard (1795–1855), American fur trader and explorer
- Alexis Cruz (born 1974), American actor
- Alexis Rivera Curet (born 1982), Puerto Rican footballer
- Alexis Curvers (1906–1992), Belgian writer
- Alexis Damianos (1921–2006), Greek, film/theatre and television director
- Alexis Davis (born 1984), Canadian mixed martial artist
- Alexis Debat (born 1977), French terrorism and national security issues commentator
- Alexis DeJoria (born 1977), American drag racer
- Alexis Denisof (born 1966), American actor
- Alexis Deschênes, Canadian politician
- Alexis de Castillon (1838–1873), French composer
- Alexis de Tocqueville (1805–1859), French political thinker and historian
- Alexis Diaz, multiple people
- Alexis Duarte (born 2000), Paraguayan footballer
- Alexis Dubus (born 1979), British actor and comedian
- Alexis Dupont (1796–1874), French opera singer
- Alexis Dziena (born 1984), American actress
- Alexis Falekas (born 1976), Greek basketball player and coach
- Alexis Ffrench (born 1970), British musician
- Alexis FitzGerald Snr (1916–1985), Irish solicitor and politician
- Alexis FitzGerald Jnr (1945–2015), Irish politician
- Alexis Flips (born 2000), French footballer
- Alexis Flores (born 1975) Honduran FBI's most wanted fugitive
- Alexis Flores Cucoch-Petraello (born 1980) Chilean footballer
- Alexis Floyd, American actress
- Alexis Galanos (1940–2019), Cypriot politician
- Alexis Galarneau (born 1999), Canadian tennis player
- Alexis Galpérine (born 1955), French classical violinist
- Alexis Gamboa (born 1999), Costa Rican football player
- Alexis Gauthier (born 1973), French chef
- Alexis Gavrilopoulos (born 1981), Greek footballer
- Alexis Georgopoulos (born 1974), American artist, music producer and DJ
- Alexis Georgoulis (born 1974), Greek actor and politician
- Alexis A. Gilliland (born 1931), American novelist and cartoonist
- Alexis Giraud-Teulon (1839–1916), French academic, lawyer and translator
- Alexis Gizaro Muvuni, DR Congo politician
- Alexis González, multiple people
- Alexis Gray-Lawson (born 1987), American basketball player
- Alexis Guendouz (born 1996), Algerian footballer
- Alexis Guérin, multiple people
- Alexis Pauline Gumbs (born 1982), American writer
- Alexis Haines (born 1991), American thief and television personality
- Alexis Hall, multiple people
- Alexis Heraclides (born 1952), Greek political scientist
- Alexis Herman (1947–2025), American political figure
- Alexis HK (born 1974), French singer
- Alexis Hoffkling, American politician
- Alexis Holmes (born 2000), American track and field athlete
- Alexis Hornbuckle (born 1985), American professional basketball player
- Alexis Hunter (1948–2014), New Zealand painter and photographer
- Alexis Iparraguirre (born 1974), Peruvian short story writer
- Alexis Izard (born 1992), French politician
- Alexis Jeffers (born 1968), Saint Kitts and Nevis politician
- Alexis Klégou (born 1989), Beninese tennis player
- Alexis Jensen, American softball player
- Alexis McGill Johnson (born 1972), American businesswoman and president of Planned Parenthood
- Alexis Jolly (born 1990), French businessman and politician
- Alexis Jones (born 1994), American basketball player
- Alexis Jones (born 1983), American activist, author, media personality and motivational speaker
- Alexis Jordan (born 1992), American singer
- Alexis Jordan (swimmer) (born 1988), Barbadian swimmer
- Alexis Joseph (born 2009), Canadian ice hockey player
- Alexis Joyce (born 1983), American sprinter
- Alexis Kaufman (born 1991), birth name of American professional wrestler Alexa Bliss
- Alexis Kennedy (born 1972), British video game writer, designer and entrepreneur
- Alexis Kirk (1936–2010), American jewelry designer
- Alexis Kirke, British composer and filmmaker
- Alexis Knapp (born 1989), American actress
- Alexis Kochan (born 1953), Ukrainian-Canadian musician and composer
- Alexis Kohler (born 1972), French government official
- Alexis Korner (1928–1984), British blues musician
- Alexis Krasilovsky (born 1950), American filmmaker and educator
- Alexis Kyritsis (born 1982), Greek basketball player
- Alexis Lafrenière (born 2001), Canadian ice hockey player
- Alexis Lapointe (1860–1924), Canadian athlete and folklore character
- Alexis Laree (born 1979), stage name of wrestler and country singer Mickie James
- Alexis Lebrun (born 2003), French table tennis player
- Alexis Lewis, American inventor
- Alexis Lichine (1913–1989), Russian wine writer and entrepreneur
- Alexis Loizidis (born 1985), Greek footballer
- Alexis Louder (born 1991), American actress
- Alexis Lykiard (born 1940), British writer of Greek heritage
- Alexis Mabille (born 1977), French fashion designer
- Alexis Mac Allister (born 1998), Argentinian football player
- Alexis Macedonski (1884/1885–1971), Romanian artist, theatrical producer, and activist
- Alexis Manyoma (born 2003), Colombian footballer
- Alexis Markowski (born 2003), American former basketball player
- Alexis Márquez (born 1989), Venezuelan swimmer
- Alexis Márquez (born 1981), Colombian footballer and manager
- Alexis Marshall, American singer, the vocalist for Daughters
- Alexis Martin, multiple people
- Alexis Martínez (1980–2009), Spanish orca trainer
- Alexis Martínez (born 1991), Mexican rifle shooter
- Alexis Mateo (born 1979), Puerto Rican drag queen
- Alexis Matias (born 1974), Puerto Rican volleyball player
- Alexis Méndez (born 1969), Venezuelan track and road cyclist
- Alexis Michalik (born 1982), Franco-British actor, scriptwriter and director
- Alexis Michelle (born 1984), American drag queen
- Alexis Minatoya (born 1988), Japanese-Belgian basketball player
- Alexis Minotis (1900–1990), Greek theater actor and director
- Alexis Murphy (1996–2013), American murder victim
- Alexis Navalny (Alexei) (1976–2024), Russian opposition leader
- Alexis Nicolas (born 1998), French kickboxer
- Alexis Noble (1963–2025), Uruguayan footballer
- Alexis Nour (1877–1940), Romanian journalist, activist, and essayist
- Alexis Ohanian (born 1983), American internet entrepreneur and investor
- Alexis Panselinos (born 1943), Greek novelist and translator
- Alexis Papahelas (born 1961), Greek investigative journalist and newspaper editor
- Alexis Pérez (born 1994), Colombian footballer
- Alexis Pinturault, French alpine skier and Olympic medalist
- Alexis Piron (1689–1773), French epigrammatist and dramatist
- Alexis Paulin Paris (1800–1881), French scholar and author
- Alexis Prince (born 1994), American basketball player
- Alexis Quezada (born 1997), American soccer player
- Alexis Manaster Ramer (born 1956), Polish-American linguist
- Alexis Rassine (1919–1992), South African ballet dancer
- Alexis Ren (born 1996), American model
- Alexis Ríos (born 1981), Puerto Rican baseball player
- Alexis Marie Rivera (1977–2012), American transgender advocate
- Alexis Rockman (born 1962), American painter
- Alexis Rodríguez, multiple people
- Alexis Rojas (cyclist) (born 1972), Colombian road cyclist
- Alexis Rojas (footballer) (born 1996), Paraguayan footballer
- Alexei Romanov (disambiguation), various members of the Romanov family
- Alexis Rossell (born 1951), Venezuelan harpist and folk musician
- Alexis Ruano Delgado (born 1985), Spanish footballer
- Alexis Rykov (1891–1938), Leader of the Soviet Union from 1924 to 1930
- Alexis Sablone (born 1986), American professional skateboarder
- Alexis Saelemaekers (born 1999), Belgian footballer
- Alexis Sánchez (born 1988), Chilean footballer
- Alexis Sánchez (athlete) (born 1971), Spanish athlete
- Alexis Sanderson (born 1948), English indologist
- Alexis Sharkey (1994–2020), American influencer and murder victim
- Alexis Shifflett (born 1996), American sitting volleyball player
- Alexis Sinduhije (born 1967), Burundian journalist
- Alexis Skye (born 1974), American model
- Alexis Skyy (born 1994), American reality television personality
- Alexis Smirnoff (1947–2019), Canadian wrestler
- Alexis Smith (1921–1993), Canadian-born American actress
- Alexis Smith (1949–2024), American artist
- Alexis Soyer (1810–1858), French chef
- Alexis Spyridonidis (born 1995), Greek basketball player
- Alexis St. Martin (1802–1880), Canadian subject of digestion experiments and voyageur
- Alexis Stamatis (born 1960), Greek novelist, playwright and poet
- Alexis Stenvall (1834–1872), Finnish author
- Alexis Stewart (born 1965), American talk radio host
- Alexis Strum, English songwriter, singer, actress, and writer
- Alexis Suárez Martín (born 1974), Spanish footballer
- Alexis SueAnn (born 1995), Malaysian model, blogger and beauty queen
- Alexis Taylor (born 1980), British musician
- Alexis Texas (born 1985), American porn actress
- Alexis Tibidi (born 1975), Cameroonian football player
- Alexis Tibidi (born 2003), French football player
- Alexis Tipton (born 1989), American voice actress
- Alexis Toth (1853–1909), Russian-American Orthodox church leader
- Alexis Tsipras (born 1974), Greek politician
- Alexis Valdés (born 1963), Cuban actor, comedian, and monologist
- Alexis Valido (born 1976), Spanish volleyball player
- Alexis Vega (born 1997), Mexican footballer
- Alexis Vega (born 1993), Argentine midfielder
- Alexis P. Vlasto (1915–2000), British historian and philologist
- Alexis Wangmene (born 1989), Cameroonian basketball player
- Alexis Williams, American activist and engineer
- Alexis Zabé (born 1970), Mexican cinematographer
- Alexis Zapata (born 1995), Colombian footballer

=== Middle name ===
- Tonea Alexis Marshall (born 1998), American hurdler
- Raúl Alexis Ortiz (born 1982), half of the Puerto Rican reggaeton duo Alexis & Fido

=== Fictional characters ===
- Alexis Colby, played by Joan Collins on the 1980s prime time soap opera Dynasty
- Alexis Davis, a character on the ABC soap opera, General Hospital
- Alexis Drazen, reoccurring character in the American television series 24, 24: Live Another Day, and 24: Legacy
- Alexis Kerib, in the anime series SSSS.Gridman
- Alexis Meade, played by Rebecca Romijn on the American television series Ugly Betty
- Alexis Castle, played by Molly Quinn on the American crime drama television series Castle
- Alexis Rhodes, a main character in the anime series Yu-Gi-Oh! GX, voiced by Priscilla Everett and Emlyn Morinelli McFarland
- Alexis Zorbas, the protagonist of Zorba the Greek
- Alexis Rose, played by Annie Murphy on the Canadian sitcom Schitt's Creek

== See also ==
- Alexis (disambiguation), which includes people known by the mononym Alexis and people with the surname Alexis
- Aleksa (given name)
- Aleksej
- Alexey
