= Teulon (surname) =

Teulon is a French surname. Notable people with the surname include:

- Alan Teulon (1934–2025), English surveyor and jazz pianist
- George K. Teulon (1812–1846), English–Texian soldier, journalist, and freemason
- Samuel Sanders Teulon (1812–1873), English architect
- William Milford Teulon (1823–1900), English architect and landscape designer

== See also ==
- Alexis Giraud-Teulon (1839–1916), French academic, lawyer, and translator
