= La Misma Gente =

La Misma Gente may refer to:

- La Misma Gente (Venezuelan band), metal band of 1970s
- La Misma Gente (Colombian band), salsa band from Cali of the 2000s
