= 25 Aniversario (disambiguation) =

25 Aniversario is an album by Juan Gabriel.

25 Aniversario may also refer to:

- 25 Aniversario, album by La Misma Gente (Colombian band)
- 25 Aniversario, album by El Gran Combo de Puerto Rico
- 25 Aniversario, album by Simón Echeverría
- 25 Aniversario, album by Mariachi Sol de Mexico
