= Alexis Rossell =

Venezuelan fusion harpist and folk musician

- Born: March 3, 1951 (age 75); Coro, Venezuela
- Genres: Fusion, folk, rock
- Occupation: Musician
- Instrument: Harp
- Label: Top Hits
- Formerly of: Venezuela Joven
- Awards: Escenario Juvenil (1978, 1980); Flor Siempreviva (1981)
- Website: alexisrossell.es.tl

Alexis Rossell (born on March 3, 1951, in Coro, Falcón) is a Venezuelan fusion harpist and folk musician. He graduated from the Juan José Landaeta National Conservatory of Music in Caracas. Rosell fuses typical Venezuelan music and instruments with elements of rock music.

== Career ==
In his youth, his main influence was Hugo Blanco, who studied with his older brother at the Liceo Aplicación in Caracas. He began playing claves in his brother's band and later moved to the harp influenced by Genaro Lobo, the band's harpist. A high school friend who was the daughter of Carmen Fisher, owner of the Fisher Music Academy in Caracas, told her mom about this kid who played the harp and Fisher recruited him for a year to play every Wednesday in her TV show in Televisora Nacional.

Influenced by Juan Vicente Torrealba and Hugo Blanco, Rossell composed his first song when he was 12 years old, Horizontes, but after the first Experiencia Psicotomimética concert organized by radio DJ Cappy Donzella on April 20, 1968, he became interested in mixing Venezuelan music with rock music. He began experimenting this fusion along with keyboardist Jorge Salamanca and bassist Antonio Alcalá using the songs Horizontes and Churún Merú, one of his better-known songs.

On January 13, 1977, Rosell created Venezuela Joven, a band with many different members over the years. The first LP was the independently produced Alexis Rossell y su Venezuela Joven (1977), which he sold at concerts and from his job at the computer center of the Universidad Simón Bolívar. Later he signed with Top Hits and reissued the album with almost all the original songs with a band made of Jorge Salamanca (teclados), Gustavo Montaño (guitar, mandolin), Luis Gonzáles (cuatro), Gustavo Sandoval (bass), Alfredo Morales (drums), Omar Amaya (percussion) y Pedro Talavera (congas).

In 1978 he won the Escenario Juvenil award as record production of the year and released Vuelo del ícaro (1979). He was also nominated to the Guaicaipuro de Oro award as composer and national band of the year. In 1979 he composed the music of the play Lo mío lo dejan en la olla of his brother Levy Rossell con quien grabó una banda sonora. and on December 1 of the same year Rosell and his band inaugurated the transmission of color TV in Venezuela with a musical program titled Alexis Rosell y su Venezuela Joven. It was broadcast by the Televisora Nacional and produced by Oscar Ibarra Moreno. The show also included Luis Mariano Rivera.

On August 15, 1980, he played in Poliedro de Caracas along Tiger's Baku, a band where Frank Quintero played at the time. Later he released El cordonazo (1980) and won the Escenario Juvenil award as group of the year (he played during the ceremony on October 24 at the Caracas Hilton).

In December 1980, he played with Vytas Brenner and his Ofrenda. This concert was to honor Grupo Madera, which had lost some members in an accident on August 15, 1980, at the Orinoco River. The bill also included Gerry Weil and his band, the remaining Grupo Madera, Paulette Dozzier and Maricruz Quintero. The following year he received the award Flor Siempreviva from the Arte de Venezuela organization for his musical work.

During the 1980s Rosell played all over Venezuela and participated in the Gira de las siete estrellas (marzo 1981), a concert where he played along other popular Venezuelan bands like Resistencia, Témpano, La Misma Gente, Mango, El Trabuco Venezolano and Esperanto. Throughout the decade he also released a series of influential Venezuelan music fusion records such as Es navidad (1980), Torbellino (1981), Sangre negra (1982), Al rescate (1983), Zapatico de navidad (1984) and Desde el infinito (1988).

In 1988 he played in Miami and returned to the city in 1992 to play the James Knight Center. That same year he played at the Teatro Teresa Carreño in Caracas. In 1996 the Baruta Municipality gave him an award for his "extensive work educating new generations of musicians".

In 2015 he played at Un Homenaje Para Vytas (A tribute to Vytas) en el Teatro Teresa Carreño. This concert was to honor Vytas Brenner and he played along Huáscar Barradas, Alfredo Naranjo, Gerry Weil, Jorge Spiteri, Guillermo Carrasco, Biella Da Costa, Gaélica and Sergio Pérez, among others.

== Personal life ==
He is brother of the late Venezuelan theater director Levy Rossell.

== Discography ==
- 1977 – Alexis Rossell y su Venezuela Joven
- 1979 – Vuelo del ícaro
- 1980 – Es navidad
- 1981 – Torbellino
- 1982 – Sangre negra
- 1983 – Al rescate
- 1984 – Zapatico de navidad
- 1988 – Desde el infinito

== Links ==
- Website of Alexis Rossell
- Alexis Rossell y su Venezuela Joven playing during the first official broadcast of color TV in Venezuela Video on YouTube

== Sources ==
- Alexis Rossell in La Venciclopedia
