= Aleksije =

Aleksije (Serbian Cyrillic: Алексије) is a Serbian masculine given name, a variant of Greek Alexis and Alexios (Latinized form Alexius). The name Aljoša is a diminutive of the name. It may refer to:

- Aleksije Vezilić, Serbian poet
- Aleksije Radičević "Branko", Serbian poet

== See also ==
- Alexey, Russian variant
- Aleksejs, Latvian variant
- Aleksej, Serbian variant
