= Aleix =

Aleix is a Catalan given name for males. It is the Catalan form of the name Alexis and may refer to:

== Given name ==
- Aleix Alcaraz (born 1990), Spanish professional racing driver
- Aleix Clapés (1850–1920), Spanish painter
- Aleix Coch (born 1991), Spanish footballer
- Aleix Domínguez (born 1992), Spanish footballer
- Aleix Espargaró (born 1989), Spanish motorcycle road racer
- Aleix Suñé (born 1986), Spanish para-alpine ski guide
- Aleix Vidal (born 1989), Spanish footballer

== Surname ==
- Pere Areny Aleix (1913–1943), Andorran convicted murderer, last person executed by Andorra
