= Scoparia absconditalis =

Scientific classification
- Kingdom: Animalia
- Phylum: Arthropoda
- Class: Insecta
- Order: Lepidoptera
- Family: Crambidae
- Genus: Scoparia
- Species: S. absconditalis

Binomial name
- Scoparia absconditalis Christoph in Romanoff, 1887

Species of moth

Scoparia absconditalis is a moth in the family Crambidae. It was described by Hugo Theodor Christoph in 1887. It is found in the north-western Caucasus.
