= Aleksej =

Aleksej (Serbian Cyrillic: Алексеј) is a Serbo-Croatian and Belarusian masculine given name, a variant of Greek Alexis and Alexios (Latinized form Alexius). The name Aljoša is a diminutive of the name. It may refer to:

- Aleksej Aleksandrov (born 1973), Belarusian chess player
- Aleksej Demjanov (1973–2021), Croatian gymnast
- Aleksej Golijanin (born 2003), Bosnian footballer
- Aleksej Nešović (born 1985), Serbian basketball player
- Aleksej Nikolić (born 1995), Slovenian basketball player
- Aleksej Pokuševski (born 2001), Serbian basketball player
- Aleksej Vukičević (born 2005), Serbian footballer
- Aleksej Potjomkin (born 2013), German Minor Artist

== See also ==
- Alexey, Russian variant
- Aleksejs, Latvian variant
- Aleksije, Serbian variant
