= Aljoša =

Aljoša (Serbian Cyrillic: Аљоша) is a Serbo-Croatian given name, a diminutive of Aleksej and Aleksije. It may refer to:

- Aljoša Jurinić (born 1989), Croatian pianist
- Aljoša Kunac (born 1980), Croatian water polo player
- Aljoša Žorga (born 1947), Slovenian former basketballer
- Aljoša Vojnović (born 1985), Croatian footballer
- Aljoša Štefanič (born 1982), Slovenian handballer
- Aljoša Buha (1962–1986), Bosnian rock musician
- Aljoša Asanović (born 1965), retired Croatian footballer
- Aljoša Josić (1921–2011), French architect
- Aljoša Čampara (born 1975), Bosnian politician

== See also ==
- Alyosha
