= Alexis Rivera =

Alexis Rivera may refer to:

- Alexis Rivera Curet (born 1982), Puerto Rican footballer
- Alexis Marie Rivera (1977–2012), transgender advocate

== See also ==
- Yamilson Rivera (Yamilson Alexis Rivera Hurtado, born 1989), Colombian footballer
