= Udea vastalis =

Scientific classification
- Domain: Eukaryota
- Kingdom: Animalia
- Phylum: Arthropoda
- Class: Insecta
- Order: Lepidoptera
- Family: Crambidae
- Genus: Udea
- Species: U. vastalis

Binomial name
- Udea vastalis (Christoph in Romanoff, 1887)

Synonyms
- Botys vastalis Christoph in Romanoff, 1887

Species of moth

Udea vastalis is a moth in the family Crambidae. It was described by Hugo Theodor Christoph in 1887. It is found in Azerbaijan and Georgia.
