= Émile Louis Ragonot =

French entomologist

- Born: 12 October 1843; Paris, France
- Died: 13 October 1895 (aged 52); Paris, France
- Occupation: Entomologist

Émile Louis Ragonot (12 October 1843 – 13 October 1895) was a French entomologist. In 1885, he became president of the Société entomologique de France.

He named 301 new genera of butterflies and moths, mostly pyralid moths.

He is also the author of several books:

- Diagnoses of North American Phycitidae and Galleriidae (1887) published in Paris
- (in French) Nouveaux genres et espèces de Phycitidae & Galleriidae (1888)
- (in French) Essai sur une classification des Pyralites (1891-1892)
- (in French) Monographie des Phycitinae et des Galleriinae. pp. 1–602 In N.M. Romanoff. Mémoires sur les Lépidoptères. Tome VIII. N.M. Romanoff, Saint-Petersbourg. xli + 602 pp. (1901)

Ragonot's collection can be found in the National Museum of Natural History, Paris, France.
