= Alexei Romanov =

Alexei Romanov may refer to:

- Alexis of Russia, Tsar of Russia from 1645 - 1676, son of Tsar Michael of Russia
- Alexei Nikolaevich, Tsarevich of Russia, heir to the throne of Russia, son of Tsar Nicholas II
- Alexei Petrovich, Tsarevich of Russia, son and heir of Peter the Great
- Grand Duke Alexei Alexandrovich of Russia, son of Tsar Alexander II
- Grand Duke Alexei Mikhailovich of Russia, grandson of Tsar Nicholas I
- Aleksey Romanov (politician) (1908–1998), a Soviet politician
- Alexei Romanov, character in The Southern Vampire Mysteries
