= Princess Cecilie of Baden =

Grand Duchess of Russia (1839–1891)

Princess Cäcilie
- Grand Duchess Olga Feodorovna of Russia
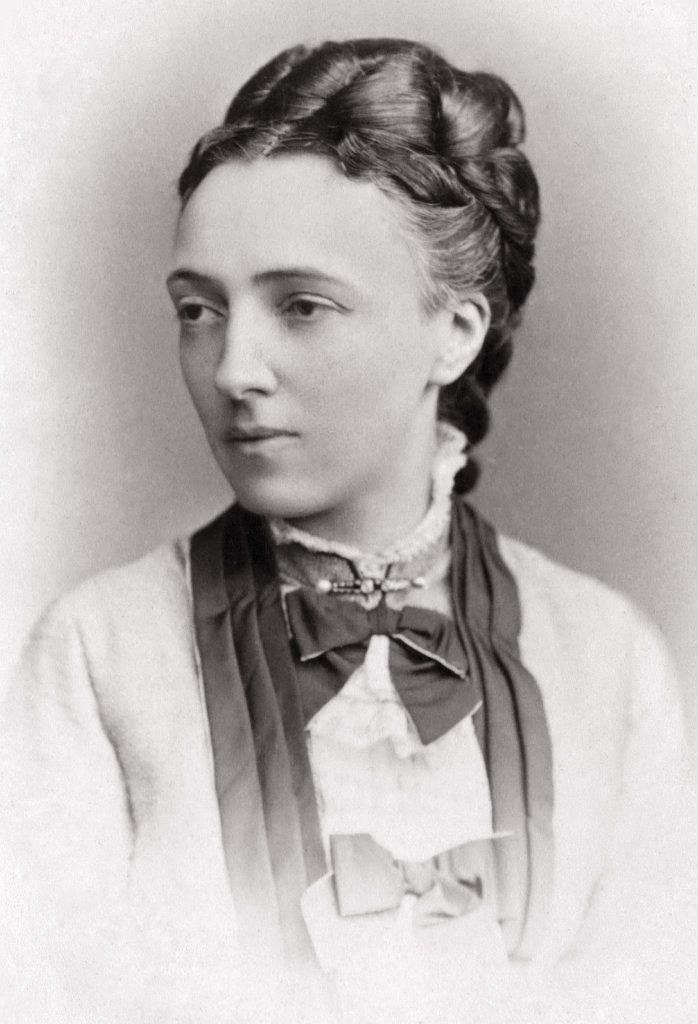
- Photograph, 1879
- Born: 20 September 1839; Karlsruhe, Grand Duchy of Baden
- Died: 12 April 1891 (aged 51); Kharkov, Russian Empire
- Burial: Saints Peter and Paul Cathedral, Saint Petersburg
- Spouse: Grand Duke Michael Nikolaevich of Russia (m. 1857)
- Issue: Grand Duke Nicholas Mikhailovich; Anastasia Mikhailovna, Grand Duchess of Mecklenburg-Schwerin; Grand Duke Michael Mikhailovich; Grand Duke George Mikhailovich; Grand Duke Alexander Mikhailovich; Grand Duke Sergei Mikhailovich; Grand Duke Alexei Mikhailovich
Names
- Cäcilie Auguste
- House: Zähringen
- Father: Leopold, Grand Duke of Baden
- Mother: Princess Sophie of Sweden

Grand Duchess Olga Feodorovna of Russia (Russian: Ольга Фёдоровна; 20 September 1839 – 12 April 1891), born Princess Cäcilie of Baden, was the youngest daughter of Grand Duke Leopold of Baden and Sophie Wilhelmine of Sweden.

She received a strict education at the court of Baden in Karlsruhe, becoming a cultured woman. On 28 August 1857, she married Grand Duke Mikhail Nikolaevich of Russia, the youngest son of Tsar Nicholas I of Russia. Upon her marriage, she converted to the Russian Orthodox faith and took the name Olga Feodorovna with the title of Grand Duchess of Russia. Unusually among the Romanovs of her generation, her marriage was a long and happy union. The couple remained devoted to each other. She raised their seven children with an iron hand.

Between 1862 and 1882, she lived with her husband and their children in the Caucasus in a palace in Tiflis. She was a strong supporter of her husband's governmental activities as a viceroy of the region and she took an interest in charities, particularly in the field of female education. In 1882, the family moved back to the Imperial court in St Petersburg to a large palace on the bank of the Neva river. With a strong personality and a sharp tongue, Grand Duchess Olga Feodorovna was not a popular member of the Romanov family. She spent the last years of her life traveling frequently, trying to find relief for her failing health. She died of a heart attack while traveling by train to Crimea.

== Early life ==
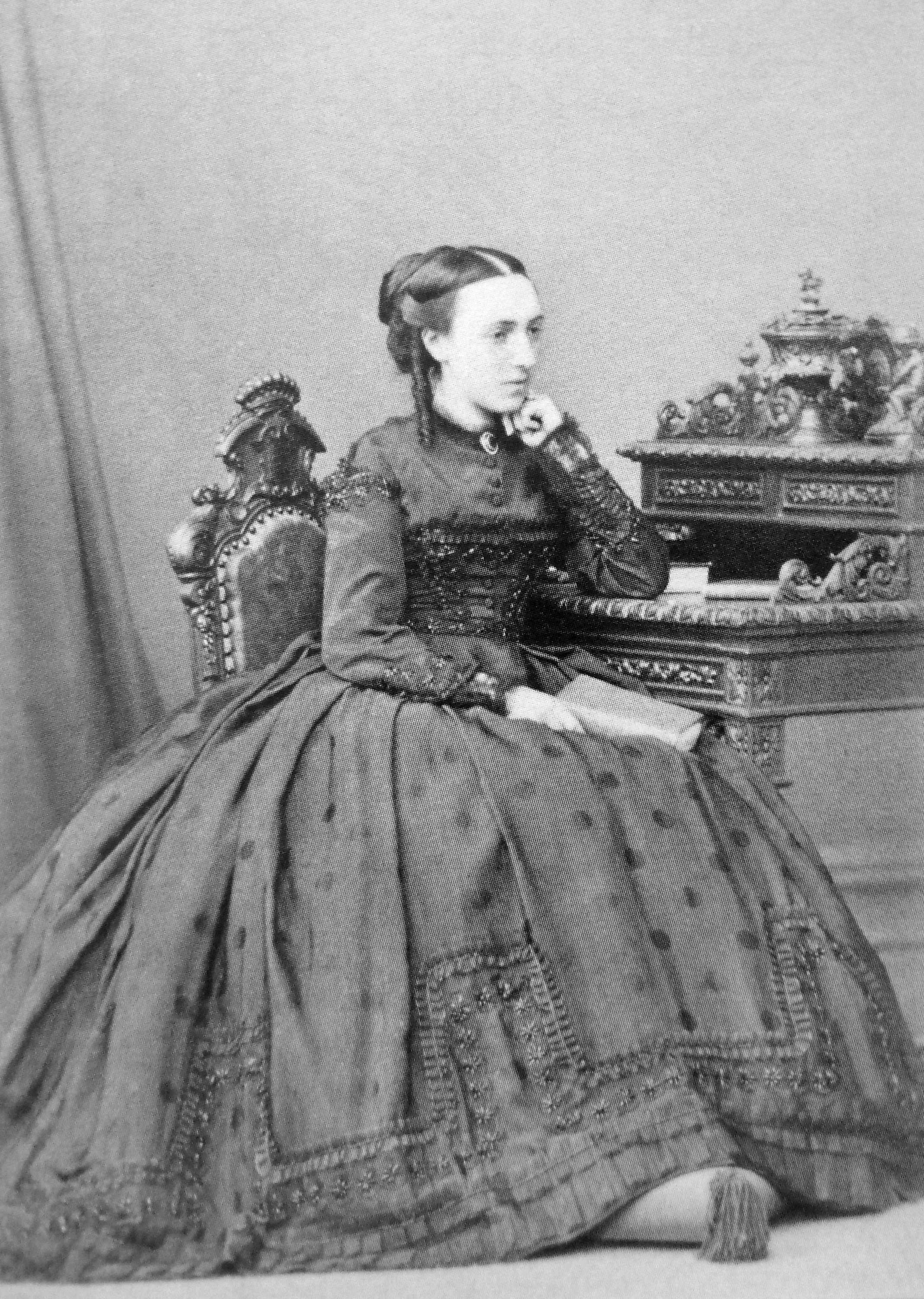
Cäcilie Auguste, Princess and Margravine of Baden

Grand Duchess Olga Feodorovna was born on 20 September 1839, in Karlsruhe as Cäcilie Auguste, Princess and Margravine of Baden. She was the youngest daughter among the seven children of Grand Duke Leopold of Baden and Princess Sophie Wilhelmine of Sweden.

Cäcilie's father, Grand Duke Leopold, descended from a morganatic branch of the Baden family (his mother was Luise Geyer von Geyersberg, a noblewoman) and thus did not have rights to a princely status or the sovereign rights of the House of Zähringen of Baden. However, in 1830 he ascended to the throne of the Grand Duchy of Baden after the main male line of his family died out. Leopold was considered the first German ruler who held in his country's liberal reforms.

Cäcilie's mother, Sophie Wilhelmine of Sweden, was a daughter of King Gustav IV Adolf of Sweden and Frederica of Baden, a sister of Elizabeth Alexeievna (Louise of Baden). Unlike her husband, Sophie Wilhelmine supported conservative policies. During the tumult caused by the appearance of Kaspar Hauser, Sophie was rumoured to have ordered Hauser's assassination in 1833. This damaged the relationship between the couple and Sophie was said to have had an affair. Court rumours attributed the paternity of Cäcilie, the couple's last child, to a Jewish banker named Haber. No historical evidence has surfaced to confirm this allegation.

During Cäcilie's childhood, the 1848-49 revolution forced the Grand Ducal family to flee from Karlsruhe to Koblenz. Cäcilie was 12 years old at the death of her father in 1852. Princess Cäcilie received a Spartan upbringing. Her relationship with her parents was formal rather than affectionate. She would later apply these same principles raising her own children. She grew into a sharp-tongued girl, witty and well-educated.

== Marriage ==
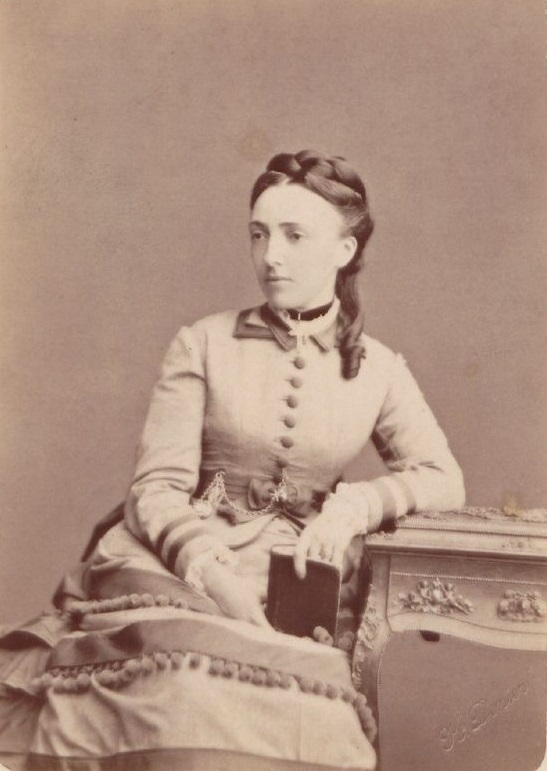
The Grand Duchess of Russia in her youth, 1860s

Princess Cäcilie was 17 years old when her family arranged her marriage to Grand Duke Michael Nikolaievich of Russia, the youngest son of Tsar Nicholas I of Russia. The details of their courtship are not known, however, theirs was a love match. In 1856, her brother, Frederick I, Grand Duke of Baden, married Princess Louise of Prussia, a daughter of the reigning Crown Prince Wilhelm I of Prussia and therefore a first cousin of Grand Duke Michael.

When Olga came to Russia as Cäcilie, her husband did not like her birth name and chose for her the name Olga Feodorovna, which she took upon her conversion to the Orthodox faith. The marriage took place on 28 August 1857 at the Chapel of the Winter Palace in Saint Petersburg. Grand Duke Michael loved his wife deeply all his life and was under her strong influence; they were like polar opposites and this only seemed to cement their alliance. Michael Nikolaevich was a kind, calm, rather dull man who would have been completely happy to devote himself only to the artillery and his family, and he did not shine with exceptional intellect. On the other hand, Olga Feodorovna was lively, sharp-tongued, witty society-lady, very fond of malicious tales and gossips – according to some of her contemporaries, gossip was her main raison d'être, or purpose for existing.

The couple remained close and theirs was a happy marriage. They lived in their own large residence in Saint Petersburg, the New Mikhailovsky Palace, which was built for them in 1861. They also had a summer residence, Mikhailovskoe on the Baltic in Peterhof, and Grushevska, a vast rural estate in southern Ukraine. The couple had seven children. Grand Duchess Olga, with a stronger personality than her husband, was the dominating force in the family. She raised her seven children with an iron hand.

== Issue ==
Name	Birth	Death	Spouse (dates of birth & death) and children
Grand Duke Nicholas Mikhailovich of Russia	26 April 1859	28 January 1919	Unmarried. He was killed by the Bolsheviks during the Russian revolution; no issue
Grand Duchess Anastasia Mikhailovna of Russia	28 July 1860	11 March 1922	Married 1879 (24 January), Frederick Francis III, Grand Duke of Mecklenburg-Schwerin (1851–1897); 1 son, 2 daughters.
Grand Duke Michael Mikhailovich of Russia	16 October 1861	26 April 1929	Married 1891 (26 February), Sophie of Merenberg (1868–1927); 1 son, 2 daughters.
Grand Duke George Mikhailovich of Russia	23 August 1863	28 January 1919	Married 1900 (12 May), Princess Maria of Greece and Denmark (1876–1940); 2 daughters. He was killed by the Bolsheviks during the Russian revolution
Grand Duke Alexander Mikhailovich of Russia	13 April 1866	26 February 1933	Married 1894 (6 August), Grand Duchess Xenia Alexandrovna of Russia (1875–1960); 1 daughter, 6 sons.
Grand Duke Sergei Mikhailovich of Russia	7 October 1869	18 July 1918	Unmarried. He was killed by the Bolsheviks during the Russian revolution; no issue
Grand Duke Alexei Mikhailovich of Russia	28 December 1875	2 March 1895	Unmarried; no issue

== Grand Duchess ==
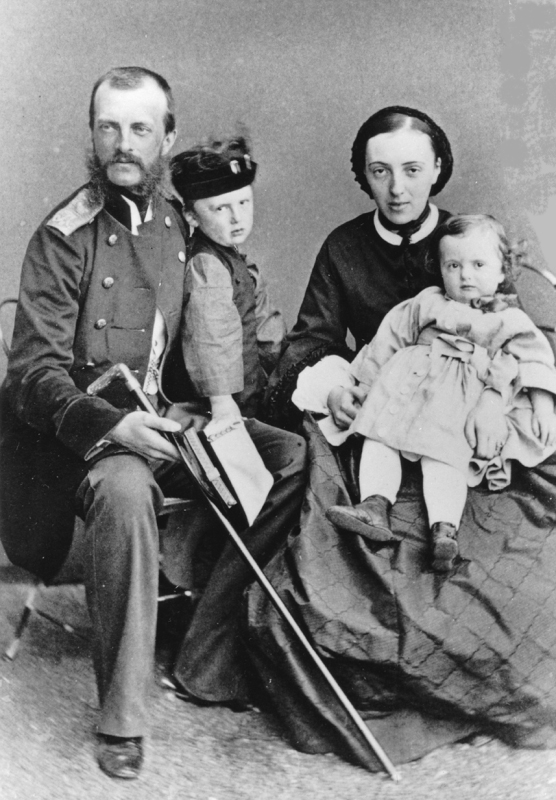
Grand Duke Michael Nikolaevich of Russia and his wife, Grand Duchess Olga Feodorovna, with their two eldest children Nicholas and Anastasia, 1862

In the fall of 1860 Olga and her husband visited England. Queen Victoria described their meeting in a letter to her daughter Victoria, Crown Princess of Prussia Windsor, 24 October 1860:

They (Michael and Cecile) came to luncheon on Monday and stayed till yesterday. Dear Marie L (Leiningen, née Baden, Cecile's sister) came with them. They were both most amiable and friendly. Cecile is as unlike her sister as possible--but Marie says her features are like their brother Karl. The features are fine but the figure is not good and she stoops and bends which spoils her very much; she is very good humored, merry and agreeable and clever, and the sisters were so happy together...The Grand Duke is really quite charming--so mild and gentle and gemütlich--always speaking German, and so unlike his brother Konstantin and his sisters. We were charmed with him, and I hear wherever he goes--high and low, love him...he looks very delicate, and so I think does she...They say that the little boy of Cecile's (Grand Duke Nicholas Mikhailovich of Russia) is lovely. Unfortunately I could not see him.

In 1862 Grand Duke Michael Nikolayevich's brother, Emperor Alexander II of Russia, appointed him as governor of the Empire in the Caucasus, and Olga moved with her husband to Tiflis. The couple had already three children, four more were born there. For almost 20 years the family lived in the Caucasus. In addition to official duties as wife of the imperial governor, Olga provided support to her husband Grand Duke Michael Nikolayevich, who supervised the implementation of the liberal reforms of Alexander II in the region.

Grand Duchess Olga took part in ceremonies as the viceroy's wife and in supporting many charities, especially in the field of female education. Using in large part personal funds, in 1864, the grand duchess organized a women's school in Tiflis, later renamed Grand Duchess Olga Feodorovna women's gymnasium. She also founded the first Ossetian school for girls, which was named Ossetian Olginsky. She also became the patroness of a hospital in Pyatigorsk which was named Saint Olga. In 1884, in St. Petersburg, Olga became the patroness of the new Alexander's men's Hospital (now the City Psychiatric Hospital No. 7). One of the streets of Tiflis - Olginskaya was named in her honor. The village of Olginskaya (now the Right Bank district of North Ossetia) was also named after her.

== Final years ==
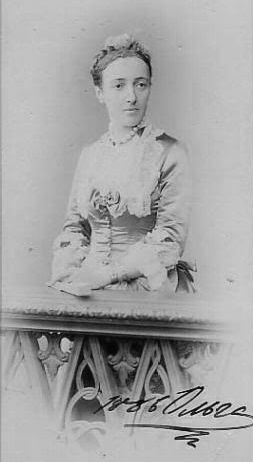
Grand Duchess Olga Feodorovna in 1886

With the assassination of Tsar Alexander II in 1881, the governorship ended in the Caucasus. During the reign of the new Tsar Alexander III of Russia, Grand Duke Michael Nikolayevich served as chairman of the Imperial Council and the family moved back permanently to Saint Petersburg. Alexander III, who did not like Olga, sometimes referred to her behind her back as "Auntie Haber", hinting at her alleged Jewish heritage and illegitimacy. Such rumors of Jewish paternity followed Olga through her life. Her husband was protective of her. The Romanovs were anti-Semitic and Olga, who was not a popular member of the family, was mocked as "Frau Haber."

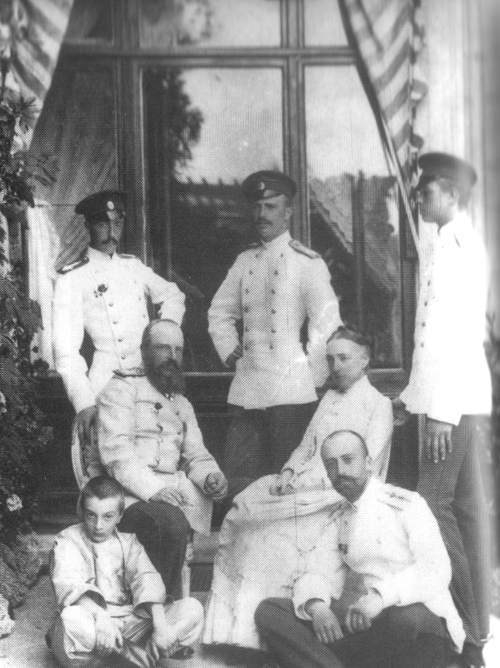
Grand Duchess Olga surrounded by her husband and sons

Grand Duchess Olga was witty and had a strong personality. Her sharp tongue brought her a lot of trouble at the Russian court. She despised the morganatic wife of Alexander II and later she was particularly indignant at Alexander III's decision to limit the number of Grand Dukes, a title her own grandchildren would be deprived of. While her husband busied himself with his military and governmental career, Grand Duchess Olga ruled her family with an iron hand. She demanded complete obedience from her children. She was particularly close to her eldest son Grand Duke Nicholas Mikhailovich of Russia, whose intellectual interests were like hers, but she remained aloof and cold towards the others. Her second son, Grand Duke Michael Mikhailovich, who was not intellectually gifted (she called him a fool), was a constant source of disappointment for her. In 1879, Olga with Grand Duchess Maria Pavlovna arranged the marriage between her only daughter, Grand Duchess Anastasia Mikhailovna of Russia, with Frederick Francis III, Grand Duke of Mecklenburg-Schwerin, Maria Pavlovna's brother. Anastasia carried some bitterness about her upbringing and relationship with her mother - her daughter Cäcilie recounts that at a party to celebrate her engagement, when she committed some infraction she was sent to bed by Olga like a naughty child. There was also an incident involving an apricot tree, which belonged to Anastasia but whose fruit she was not allowed to eat.

In his journals, Alexander Polovtsov, State Secretary during Alexander III's reign, left an unsympathetic portrayal of Grand Duchess Olga. Although he admitted she was clever, he described her as an acid-tongued, quarrelsome, idle woman, who did nothing but sit in her palace on the bank of the Neva river and gaze through the window onto the walking people and speak nasty things about them. Just a sharp-tongued high-society lady without any other hobbies but gossiping and caring about privileges for her children.

== Death ==
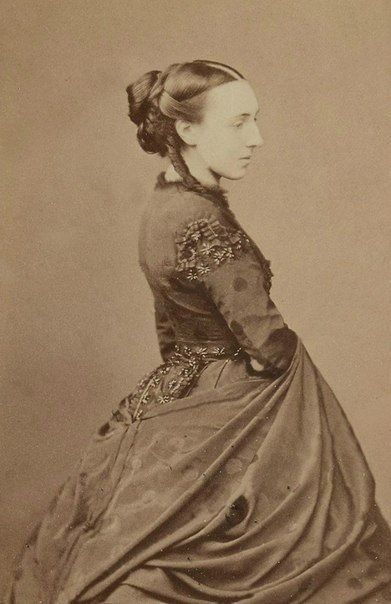
Olga Feodorovna by Camille Silvy

Olga, who was tradition-conscious and deeply devout, suffered a terrible blow when her second son, Grand Duke Michael Mikhailovich contracted an unequal marriage to Countess Sophie of Merenberg in San Remo on 26 February 1891. The marriage was not only morganatic but also illegal (secret) under the statute of the Imperial Family and caused a great scandal at the Russian court. Grand Duke Michael Mikhailovich was deprived of his military rank and of his position as adjutant at the Imperial Court and also forbidden to return to Russia for life. When Olga heard of her son's morganatic marriage, she was deeply wounded and fell ill. A few days later, at the insistence of her doctors, she set out for her estate in Crimea, near the Cape of Ai-Todor, to recover her health.

Around noon on 9 April 1891, the express train in which Olga was riding passed through Kharkov. During the afternoon the Grand Duchess suffered a heart attack. As Kharkov was the largest nearby city, the train returned there at about 7 pm. Several doctors in Kharkov were invited into her train compartment and they diagnosed her ailments as an inflammation of the lungs. She was taken into the tsar's waiting room in the station. She was surrounded by her attendants and doctors, but neither her husband nor any of her children were with her as she was traveling alone. A priest was called and she died there at the train station three days later on 12 April 1891 at the age of 51. She was buried at the Peter and Paul Cathedral in Saint Petersburg.

== Ancestry ==
Ancestors of Princess Cecilie of Baden

8. Frederick, Hereditary Prince of Baden-Durlach
4. Charles Frederick, Grand Duke of Baden
9. Princess Amalia of Nassau-Dietz
2. Leopold, Grand Duke of Baden
10. Ludwig Heinrich, Baron Geyer of Geyersberg
5. Baroness Louise Caroline Geyer of Geyersberg
11. Countess Maximiliana Christiane of Sponeck
1. Princess Cäcilie of Baden
12. Gustav III of Sweden
6. Gustav IV Adolf of Sweden
13. Princess Sophia Magdalena of Denmark
3. Princess Sophie of Sweden
14. Charles Louis, Hereditary Prince of Baden
7. Princess Frederica of Baden
15. Landgravine Amalie of Hesse-Darmstadt

== Bibliography ==
- Alexander, Grand Duke of Russia, Once a Grand Duke, Cassell, London, 1932.
- Cockfield, Jamie H, White Crow, Praeger, 2002, ISBN 0-275-97778-1
- Perry, John and Pleshakov, Konstantin. The Flight of the Romanovs, Basic Books, 1999, ISBN 0-465-02462-9.
- Zeepvat, Charlotte. The Camera and the Tsars, Sutton Publishing, 2004, ISBN 0-7509-3049-7.
