= Aleixo =

Aleixo is the Galician and Portuguese version of Alexis. It may refer to:

- Aleixo de Abreu (1568–1630), Portuguese physician and tropical pathologist
- Aleixo de Menezes (1559–1617), Archbishop of Goa, Archbishop of Braga, Portugal, and Spanish viceroy of Portugal
- Éder Aleixo de Assis (born 1957), former Brazilian footballer
- Fonte Aleixo, village on the island of Fogo, Cape Verde
- Pedro Aleixo (1901–1975), Vice-President of Brazil 1967–1969
- São Miguel do Aleixo, municipality located in the Brazilian state of Sergipe
