= Alexis Guérin =

Alexis Guérin may refer to:

- Alexis Guérin (cyclist) (born 1992), French cyclist
- Alexis Guérin (footballer) (born 2000), French footballer
