= Grand Duke Michael Nikolaevich of Russia =

Russian noble (1832–1909)

Grand Duke Michael Nikolaevich
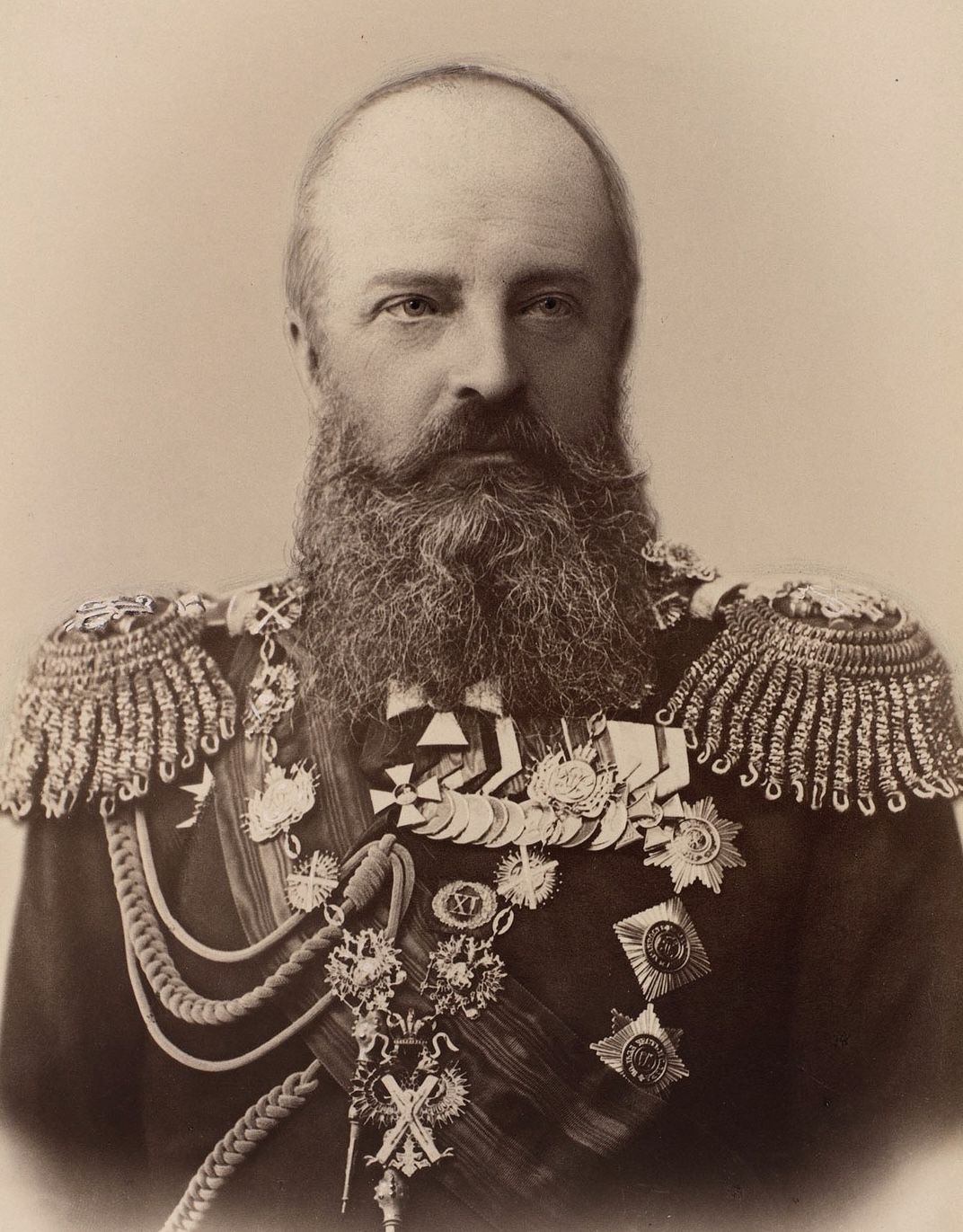
- Michael Nikolaevich, c. 1880–90
- Born: 25 October 1832; Peterhof Palace, Saint Petersburg, Russia
- Died: 18 December 1909 (aged 77); Cannes, Alpes-Maritimes, France
- Spouse: Princess Cecilie of Baden (m. 1857; died 1891)
- Issue: Grand Duke Nicholas Mikhailovich; Anastasia Mikhailovna, Grand Duchess of Mecklenburg-Schwerin; Grand Duke Michael Mikhailovich; Grand Duke George Mikhailovich; Grand Duke Alexander Mikhailovich; Grand Duke Sergei Mikhailovich; Grand Duke Alexei Mikhailovich
- House: Holstein-Gottorp-Romanov
- Father: Nicholas I of Russia
- Mother: Charlotte of Prussia
- Military career
- Allegiance: Russia
- Branch: Imperial Russian Army
- Service years: 1846–1909
- Rank: Generalfeldmarschall
- Commands: Caucasus Military District

Grand Duke Michael Nikolaevich of Russia (Russian: Михаил Николаевич; 25 October 1832 – 18 December 1909) was a Russian field marshal, the fourth son and seventh child of Emperor Nicholas I of Russia and Charlotte of Prussia. He was the first owner of the New Michael Palace on the Palace Quay in Saint Petersburg.

== Marriage and issue ==
On 16 August 1857, he married Princess Cecilie of Baden (1839–1891), daughter of Leopold, Grand Duke of Baden and Sophie of Sweden. Cecilie adopted the name Olga Feodorovna, and had the following children with him:

Name	Birth	Death	Spouse (dates of birth & death) and children
Grand Duke Nicholas Mikhailovich of Russia	26 April 1859	28 January 1919	Unmarried. He was killed by the Bolsheviks during the Russian revolution; no issue
Grand Duchess Anastasia Mikhailovna of Russia	28 July 1860	11 March 1922	Married 1879 (24 January), Frederick Francis III, Grand Duke of Mecklenburg-Schwerin (1851–1897); 1 son, 2 daughters; 1 illegitimate son.
Grand Duke Michael Mikhailovich of Russia	16 October 1861	26 April 1929	Married 1891 (26 February), Sophie of Merenberg (1868–1927); 1 son, 2 daughters.
Grand Duke George Mikhailovich of Russia	23 August 1863	28 January 1919	Married 1900 (12 May), Princess Maria of Greece and Denmark (1876–1940); 2 daughters. He was killed by the Bolsheviks during the Russian revolution.
Grand Duke Alexander Mikhailovich of Russia	13 April 1866	26 February 1933	Married 1894 (6 August), Grand Duchess Xenia Alexandrovna of Russia (1875–1960); 1 daughter, 6 sons.
Grand Duke Sergei Mikhailovich of Russia	7 October 1869	18 July 1918	Unmarried. He was killed by the Bolsheviks during the Russian revolution; no issue
Grand Duke Alexei Mikhailovich of Russia	28 December 1875	2 March 1895	Unmarried; no issue

== Career ==
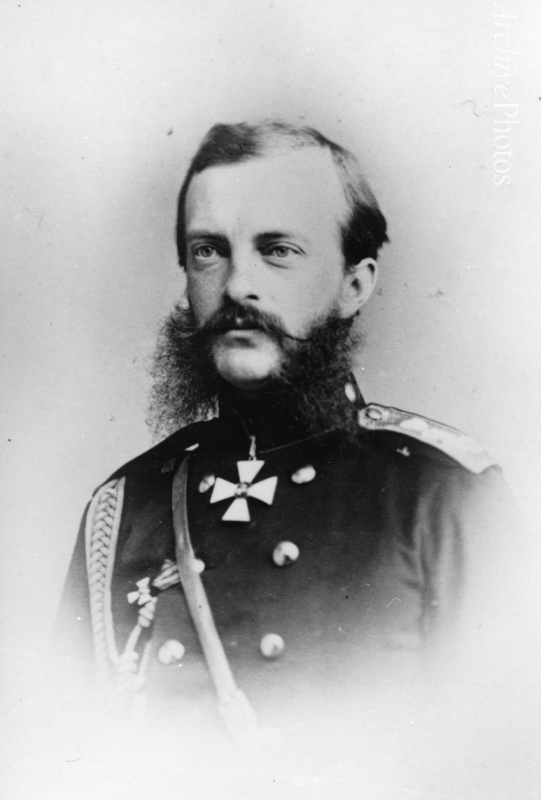
Michael Nicolaevich as a young man

He served 20 years (1862–1882) as the Governor General of Caucasia, being seated in Tbilisi, the town which most of his children remembered as the home of their childhood. In the Russo-Turkish War of 1877–1878, he was nominal Commander-in-Chief of the Russian troops in the Caucasus and was appointed Field Marshal General in April 1878.

In the course of his life, four members of his family ruled as Emperors of Russia: his father, Nicholas I; his brother, Alexander II; his nephew, Alexander III; as well as his grand-nephew, Nicholas II, whose second daughter, Grand Duchess Tatiana, the Grand Duke was godfather to.

He died in Cannes, France, on 18 December 1909. He was the last surviving legitimate grandchild of Paul I of Russia.

== Legacy ==
He was remembered by Grand Duchess Maria Pavlovna, granddaughter of his eldest brother, in her memoirs: "My great-uncle, Grand Duke Michael came from time to time to pay us visits. He was an old gentleman of great height and unforgettable elegance; he fascinated us by the perfection and harmony of his gestures, by his affability and his air of a grand seigneur of an epoch already vanished. He was the last of the Grand Dukes who, according to the custom of my grandfather's time, tutoi-ed the men, and in spite of his age he bowed with touching grace before the women as he kissed their hands."

== Honours ==
National orders and decorations

- Knight of St. Andrew, 1832
- Knight of St. Alexander Nevsky, 1832
- Knight of the White Eagle, 1832
- Knight of St. Anna, 1st Class, 1832
- Knight of St. George, 4th Class, July 1854; 2nd Class, February 1864; 1st Class, September 1877
- Knight of St. Vladimir, 1st Class, January 1863
- Golden Saber "For Bravery", 1863; Golden Sword "For the conquest of the Caucasus", in Diamonds and Emeralds, February 1864
- Knight of St. Stanislaus, 1st Class, November 1865

Foreign orders and decorations

- Prussia:
  - Knight of the Black Eagle, 14 June 1838
  - Grand Cross of the Red Eagle, 14 June 1838
  - Pour le Mérite (military), 8 December 1871; with Oak Leaves, 28 November 1877
- Württemberg:
  - Grand Cross of the Württemberg Crown, 1846
  - Grand Cross of the Military Merit Order, 10 September 1878
- Netherlands: Grand Cross of the Netherlands Lion, 1849
- Austria: Grand Cross of the Royal Hungarian Order of St. Stephen, 1851
- Grand Duchy of Hesse: Grand Cross of the Ludwig Order, 7 June 1852
- Saxe-Weimar-Eisenach: Grand Cross of the White Falcon, 19 June 1852
- Baden:
  - Knight of the House Order of Fidelity, 1852
  - Grand Cross of the Zähringer Lion, 1852
  - Grand Cross of the Military Karl-Friedrich Merit Order, 1864
- Bavaria: Knight of St. Hubert, 1852
- Parma: Senator Grand Cross of the Constantinian Order of St. George, 1852
- Saxony: Knight of the Rue Crown, 1852
- Two Sicilies: Grand Cross of St. Ferdinand and Merit, 1852
- Oldenburg: Grand Cross of the Order of Duke Peter Friedrich Ludwig, with Golden Crown, 26 July 1853
- Sardinia: Knight of the Annunciation, 11 January 1857
- Nassau: Knight of the Gold Lion of Nassau, 1860
- Persia: Order of the August Portrait, 1865
- France: Grand Cross of the Legion of Honour, June 1876
- Mecklenburg-Schwerin: Military Merit Cross, 2nd and 1st Classes, November 1877
- Denmark: Knight of the Elephant, 10 September 1881
- Sweden-Norway: Knight of the Seraphim, 15 February 1892
- Emirate of Bukhara: Order of the Sun of Alexander, 1898

== Ancestors ==
Ancestors of Grand Duke Michael Nikolaevich of Russia

8. Peter III of Russia
4. Paul I of Russia
9. Catherine II of Russia
2. Nicholas I of Russia
10. Frederick II Eugene, Duke of Württemberg
5. Duchess Sophie Dorothea of Württemburg
11. Margravine Friederike Dorothea of Brandenburg-Schwedt
1. Grand Duke Michael Nicolaevich of Russia
12. Frederick William II of Prussia
6. Frederick William III of Prussia
13. Landgravine Frederika Louisa of Hesse-Darmstadt
3. Princess Charlotte of Prussia
14. Charles II, Grand Duke of Mecklenburg-Strelitz
7. Duchess Louise of Mecklenburg-Strelitz
15. Princess Friederike of Hesse-Darmstadt
