= Ministry of Interior (Federation of Bosnia and Herzegovina) =

Federalno ministarstvo unutrašnjih poslova
- Federalno ministarstvo unutarnjih poslova

Agency overview
- Formed: 23 June 1994
- Headquarters: Sarajevo, Bosnia and Herzegovina
- Annual budget: Classified
- Ministers responsible: Ramo Isak, Minister of Interior
- Agency executives: Milica Jauz, Head of Department for Public Relations; Katarina Stević, Head of Department for International Cooperation
- Website: www.fmup.gov.ba

The Federal Ministry of Interior (FMUP) (Bosnian: Federalno ministarstvo unutrašnjih poslova; Croatian: Ministarstvo unutarnjih poslova) is the interior ministry of the Federation of Bosnia and Herzegovina, an entity of Bosnia and Herzegovina.

== Internal Organization ==
- Cabinet of Minister
- Sector for Administrative Issues
- Police Academy
- Inspectorate for Supervision of the Agencies for Protection of Persons and Property
- Sector for Material-Financial Affairs
- Sector for General and Common Affairs
- Desk for Professional and Administrative Issues Related to Office for Complaints of Public

== Internal Organization of the Federal Police Administration ==
Under the Ministry itself there is an administration dealing with the police directly which is the Federal Police Administration:

- Cabinet of the Director of Police Administration
- Sector for Police Support and Administration
- Special Police Unit
- Unit for Protection of Persons and Property
- Sector of Criminological Police
- Center for Forensics and Support
- Unit for Professional Standards
- Operative-Communicational Center
- Department for Control of Manufacture, Marketing and Transport of Explosive Substances

== Activity ==
- preventing and disclosing criminal acts of the international crime and terrorism, unauthorized narcotics trafficking and organized crime and other criminal acts falling under jurisdiction of the Federation of Bosnia and Herzegovina;
- tracing and capture of those who committed such criminal acts and their handing over to the relevant authorities;
- providing criminological-technical expert opinions;
- issues and publishes Interpol's international, Federal and inter-cantonal pursuits;
- cooperates with relevant prosecutor's offices related to processing the criminal cases;
- The Federation of Bosnia and Herzegovina’s citizenship issues;
- providing security services to eligible persons and buildings of the Federation of Bosnia and Herzegovina;
- safeguard of human rights and civil freedoms in area of the interior affairs;
- transport of explosive substances;
- other tasks falling under its competence as established by the law on Interior Affairs and other regulations.

== List of ministers ==
=== Ministers of Internal Affairs of the Republic of Bosnia and Herzegovina (1990–1996) ===
Political parties:
Party of Democratic Action

Portrait	Name (Birth–Death)	Term of office			Political party
Portrait	Name (Birth–Death)	Took office	Left office	Time in office	Political party
1	Alija Delimustafić (born 1954)	20 December 1990	15 June 1992	1 year, 178 days	SDA
2	Jusuf Pušina (born 1949)	15 June 1992	1 June 1993	351 days	SDA
3	Bakir Alispahić (born 1947)	1 June 1993	30 January 1996	2 years, 243 days	SDA

=== Ministers of Interior of the Federation of Bosnia and Herzegovina (1994–present) ===
Political parties:
Party of Democratic Action Social Democratic Party Party for Bosnia and Herzegovina People and Justice
People's Power

Portrait	Name (Birth–Death)	Term of office			Time in office	Political party
Portrait	Name (Birth–Death)	Nationality	Took office	Left office	Time in office	Political party
1	Bakir Alispahić (born 1956)	Bosniak	23 June 1994	30 January 1996	1 year, 221 days	SDA
2	Avdo Hebib	Bosniak	31 January 1996	18 December 1996	322 days	SDA
3	Mehmed Žilić (born 1947)	Bosniak	18 December 1996	12 March 2001	2 years, 84 days	SDA
4	Muhamed Bešić (1933–2015)	Bosniak	12 March 2001	12 October 2001	214 days	SDP BiH
5	Ramo Masleša	Bosniak	28 November 2001	14 February 2003	1 year, 78 days	SDP BiH
6	Mevludin Halilović (born 1969)	Bosniak	14 February 2003	30 March 2007	4 years, 44 days	SDA
7	Muhidin Alić (born 1960)	Bosniak	30 March 2007	17 March 2011	3 years, 352 days	SBiH
8	Predrag Kurteš (born 1953)	Serb	17 March 2011	31 March 2015	4 years, 14 days	SDP BiH
9	Aljoša Čampara (born 1975)	Bosniak	31 March 2015	28 April 2023	8 years, 28 days	SDA (until October 2020)
	Aljoša Čampara (born 1975)	Bosniak	31 March 2015	28 April 2023	8 years, 28 days	NiP (from February 2021)
10	Ramo Isak (born 1973)	Bosniak	28 April 2023	Incumbent	3 years, 147 days	SN
