= Alexis González =

Alexis González may refer to:

- Alexis González (Paraguayan footballer) (born 1992), Paraguayan footballer
- Alexis González (Argentine footballer) (born 2005)
- Alexis González (volleyball) (born 1981), Argentine volleyball player
- Alexis Massol González, civil engineer and environmentalist from Puerto Rico
