= Aljoša Čampara =

Bosnian politician (born 1975)

Member of the Federal House of Peoples
- Incumbent
- Assumed office 20 February 2019

Federal Minister of Interior
- In office 31 March 2015 – 28 April 2023
- Prime Minister: Fadil Novalić
- Preceded by: Predrag Kurteš
- Succeeded by: Ramo Isak
Additional positions
Deputy Mayor of Sarajevo
In office 27 March 2013 – 31 March 2015
Mayor	Ivo Komšić

Personal details
- Born: 20 January 1975 (age 51) Dubrovnik, SR Croatia, SFR Yugoslavia
- Party: People and Justice (2021–present)
- Other political affiliations: Party of Democratic Action (until 2020)
- Spouse: Amela Čampara
- Relations: Denis Zvizdić (cousin)
- Parent: Avdo Čampara (father)
- Education: University of Sarajevo (LLB)
- Profession: Lawyer

Aljoša Čampara (born 20 January 1975) is a Bosnian politician who served as the Federal Minister of Interior from 2015 to 2023. He is currently a member of the Federal House of Peoples and was the deputy mayor of Sarajevo as well.

Čampara was a member of the Party of Democratic Action, until he left it in 2020 to join the People and Justice party a year later.

== Early life and education ==
Čampara was born in Dubrovnik to a very influential family, but has nearly all his life lived in Sarajevo. His father was Avdo Čampara, a prominent Bosniak politician and a close associate of Alija Izetbegović, a Bosniak leader during the Bosnian War. After finishing elementary school and high school, Čampara attended the Sarajevo Faculty of Law.

== Political career ==
Soon after graduating, Čampara was employed as an associate in the Department for Personnel Issues and the Department for Protocols of the Parliamentary Assembly of Bosnia and Herzegovina. After that, he held a various administrative duties, he was a secretary of the Constitutional-Legal Commission of the national House of Peoples, and later a secretary of the House of Peoples, than a secretary of the Joint Service of the Parliamentary Assembly of Bosnia and Herzegovina, after which he was named an advisor of the Chairman of the House of Peoples, later becoming a member of the Legislative-Legal Commission of the House of Peoples, where he served as an external expert. Čampara was also a member of the Steering Committee of the Faculty of Political Science in Sarajevo. He is currently a member of the Assembly of the Islamic Community of Bosnia and Herzegovina.

Ivo Komšić was elected Mayor of Sarajevo on 27 March 2013, while Čampara was elected deputy mayor as a Bosniak representative, along with Rako Čović, who was elected as the Serb representative.

From 31 March 2015 until 28 April 2023, Čampara served as the Federal Minister of Interior in the government of Fadil Novalić.

Political offices
Preceded by Predrag Kurteš	Federal Minister of Interior; 2015–2023	Succeeded by Ramo Isak
