= Gerry Weil =

Austrian-born Venezuelan jazz pianist (1939–2024)

- Born: Gerhard Weilheim; 11 August 1939; Vienna, Austria
- Died: 16 November 2024 (aged 85) Caracas, Venezuela
- Genres: Venezuelan jazz
- Occupations: Musician, composer
- Instrument: Piano

Gerhard Weilheim (11 August 1939 – 16 November 2024), better known as Gerry Weil, was an Austrian-born Venezuelan jazz musician. In 2009, Weil received the Decoration of Merit in Gold for Services to the Republic of Austria from the Austrian government. Weil died on 16 November 2024, at the age of 85.

== Discography ==
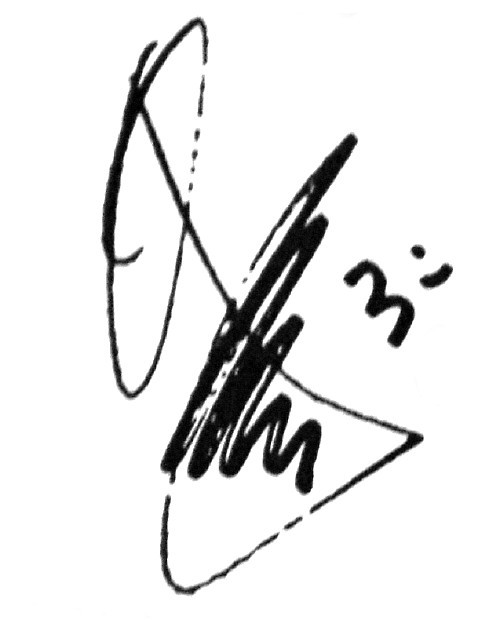
Gerry Weil signature

- 1969: El Quinteto De Jazz
- 1971: The Message
  1. "The Joy Within' Yourself" (Gerry Weil)
  2. "The Bull's Problem" (Gerry Weil)
  3. "The Message" (Gerry Weil)
  4. "Johnny's Bag" (Gerry Weil)
  5. "What Is A Man" (Gerry Weil)
  6. "Little Man" (Gerry Weil)
- 1984: Jazz En Caracas
- 1989: Autana/Magic Mountain
- 1993: Volao
- 1999: Profundo
- 2005: Free Play & Love Songs
- 2006: Empatía
- 2006: Navijazz
- 2009: Tepuy
- 2020: Kosmic Flow (80 Years Young)
