= Alexis Hall =

Alexis Hall may refer to:

- Alexis Hall (actress) (born 1980), British actress, singer and model
- Alexis Hall (writer), English author
