= 25 Aniversario =

25 Aniversario: Solos, Duetos Y Versiones Especiales

Compilation album by Juan Gabriel
- Released: 1996
- Recorded: 1971–1996
- Genre: Latin
- Label: Sony Music Latin

25 Aniversario (Eng.: twenty-fifth anniversary) is a compilation album released by Juan Gabriel in 1996. This is a compilation album featuring: Duets, special versions, alternate versions, b sides and solo numbers.

Te Sigo Amando - 1st version with mariachi, available on: Ella 1980 (Album available for limited time only)

No Tengo Dinero (Japanese version)

Déjame Vivir (featuring Rocío Dúrcal)

No Volverás a Verme (featuring La Prieta Linda)

Me He Quedado Solo (Japanese version)

17 Años (featuring María Victoria)

Perdóname, Olvídalo (featuring Rocío Dúrcal)

Qué Bello es el Amor (featuring Estela Nuñez)

== Disc 1 ==
All tracks are written by Juan Gabriel.

No.	Title	Length
1.	"Eternamente Agradecido - Recuerdos II 1984"	3:39
2.	"Que Se Parezca a Ti - Ella 1980 (Album available for limited time only)"	2:58
3.	"Mañana, Mañana (featuring Estela Nuñez) - Ella 1980 (Album available for limited time only)"	2:49
4.	"Tristeza y Soledad - Ella 1980 (Album available for limited time only)"	4:34
5.	"No Tengo Dinero (japanese version)"	3:01
6.	"Dejame Vivir (featuring Rocío Dúrcal) - Canta a Juan Gabriel Vol. VI 1984"	3:42
7.	"Pensamientos - Debo Hacerlo 1987"	8:59
8.	"No Quiero / Toma, Te Don la Vida (portuguese version)"	2:26
9.	"No Volveras a Verme (featuring La Prieta Linda) (Not previously available on album Te Llegará Mi Olvido 1977)"	4:12
10.	"Maria de la Esperanza (Not previously available on album Recuerdos II 1984)"	3:25
11.	"Me He Quedado Solo (Japanese version)"	2:58
12.	"Te Quiero Mucho Mucho (featuring Rocío Dúrcal) - Canta a Juan Gabriel Vol. VI 1984"	3:34

=== Disc 2 ===
No.	Title	Length
1.	"24 de Diciembre (Not previously available on album Recuerdos II 1984)"	3:27
2.	"Lily / Vive (portuguese version)"	3:17
3.	"Esta Noche (Roma Parlaie Tu) (featuring Estela Nuñez) - Ella 1980 (Album available for limited time only)"	3:02
4.	"Señora Maria Victoria (Not previously available on album 17 Años 1976)"	4:45
5.	"Nao Tenho Dinheiro / No Tengo Dinero (portuguese version)"	3:02
6.	"17 Años (featuring María Victoria) - 17 Años 1976"	3:09
7.	"Ella No Me Quiere - Ella 1980 (Album available for limited time only)"	2:51
8.	"Eres Libre (Not previously available on album Me Gusta Bailar Contigo 1979)"	3:41
9.	"Perdoname, Olvidalo (featuring Rocío Dúrcal) - Canta a Juan Gabriel Vol. VI 1984"	3:36
10.	"Te Sigo Amando (1st version with mariachi) - Ella 1980 (Album available for limited time only)"	2:46
11.	"Que Bello es el Amor (featuring Estela Nuñez) - Demasiado Amor 1980"	3:09
12.	"Debo Hacerlo - Debo Hacerlo 1987"	9:37
13.	"Es Mi Vida (Not previously available on album Recuerdos 1980)"	3:17
