= Alexis Panselinos =

Greek novelist and translator (born 1943)

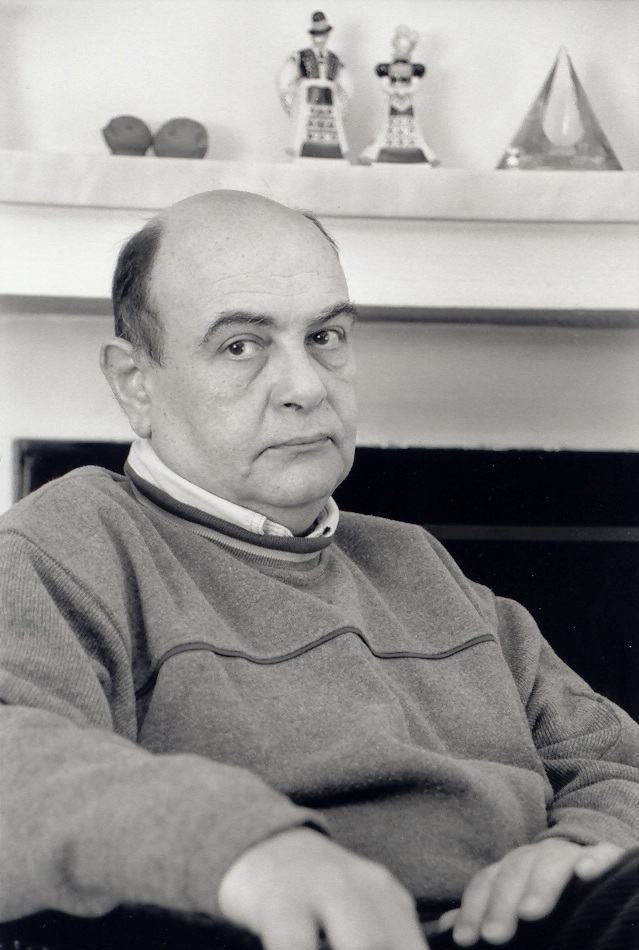
- Born: 1943 (age 82–83); Athens, Greece
- Occupation: novelist
- Writing career
- Period: 1982–

Alexis Panselinos (Greek: Αλέξης Πανσέληνος) (born 1943 in Athens, Greece) is a Greek novelist and translator. He is the son of Assimakis Panselinos (1903–1984) an author and poet and Ephie Pliatsika-Panselinos (1907–1997) also a poet and a novelist. He read Law at the University of Athens and worked as a practicing lawyer. He is a resident of Athens, married to novelist Lucy Dervis. His first book, a collection of four stories, appeared in 1982. In 1986 he published his first novel, 'The Great Procession" (Η Μεγάλη Πομπή) which obtained a Novel State Prize. In 1997 he was the Greek candidate for the European Literary Award (Aristeion) with his third novel, 'Zaida or the Camel in the Snow' (Ζαΐδα ή Η καμήλα στα χιόνια). Many of his books have been translated into French, Italian, German, English, Romanian and Polish. Panselinos has also translated novels from English and German.

== Works ==
=== Novels ===
- Η Μεγάλη Πομπή (The Great Procession), 1985
- Βραδυές μπαλέτου (Ballet nights), 1991
- Ζαΐδα ή Η καμήλα στα χιόνια (Zaide or The camel in the snow), 1996
- Ο Κουτσός άγγελος (The Lame Angel), 2002
- Σκοτεινές επιγραφές (The Dark Inscriptions), 2011
- Η κρυφή πόρτα (The secret door), 2016
- Ελαφρά ελληνικά τραγούδια (Greek light songs), 2018
- Λάδι σε καμβά (Oil on canvass), 2022
- Ξεχασμενες λέξεις (Forgotten words), 20025

=== Short fiction ===
- Ιστορίες με σκύλους (Dog stories), 1982
- Τέσσερις Ελληνικοί Φόνοι (Four Greek Murders) 2004

=== Non-fiction ===
- Δοκιμαστικές πτήσεις (Test flights), 1993
- Mία λέξη χίλιες εικόνες (One Word A Thousand Pictures), 2004
- Σεμινάρια δημιουργικής γραφής (Seminars of creative writing), 2017

== Translated works ==
- Betsy Lost (transl. Caroline Harbouri) Kedros Publications, Athens
- La Grande Procession (transl. Henri Tonnet) Les Editions du Griot, Paris
- La Grande processione (transl. Maurizio De Rosa) Crocetti Editore, Milano
- Zaide ou Le chameau dans la neige (transl. Henri Tonnet) Gallimard, Paris
- Zaide oder das Kammel in der Schnee (transl. Theo Votsos) Berlin Verlag, Berlin
- Zaida (transl. Mario Cazzulo) Crocetti Editore, Milano
- Tajemnicze inskrypcje (The Dark Inscriptions) (transl. Alicja Biadun) Kziazkowe Klimaty, Wroclaw
- The Lame Angel (transl.Caroline Petrie Harbouri) Recital Publishing, Woodstock NY, USA
- Ușa secretă (The secret door) (transl. Edith Uncu) Editura Omonia, Bucharest (announced for 2026)

=== Translations ===
- Hope, Anthony, Ο αιχμάλωτος της Ζέντα (The Prisoner of Zenda), 1988
- Mörike, Eduard,Ο Μότσαρτ στον δρόμο για την Πράγα (Mozart auf der Reise nach Prag), 1996
- Barth, John, Ο Βλακοχορτοφάγος (The Sot-Weed Factor), 1999
- Harbouri, Caroline Petrie, Φιλάδελφος (The Brothers Carburi), 2002

=== Awards ===
- 2nd State Prize for his novel The Great Procession in 1986
- Novel Prize of the 'Diavazo' Magazine for his novel The Dark Inscriptions in 2012
- The Greek Candidacy for the European Literary Prize (Aristeion) with his novel Zaida or The Camel in the Snow in 1997
- Novel Prize of the Athens Academy (K. & E. Ouranis Foundation) for his novel Light Greek Songs in 2018
- The Great Award for Life Achievement by the literary magazine O Anagnostis (The Reader) in 2020
- Honorary Doctorate of the Translation & Interpretation Faculty of Ionian University, Corfu in 2021
