= Alexis Skye =

American model (born 1974)

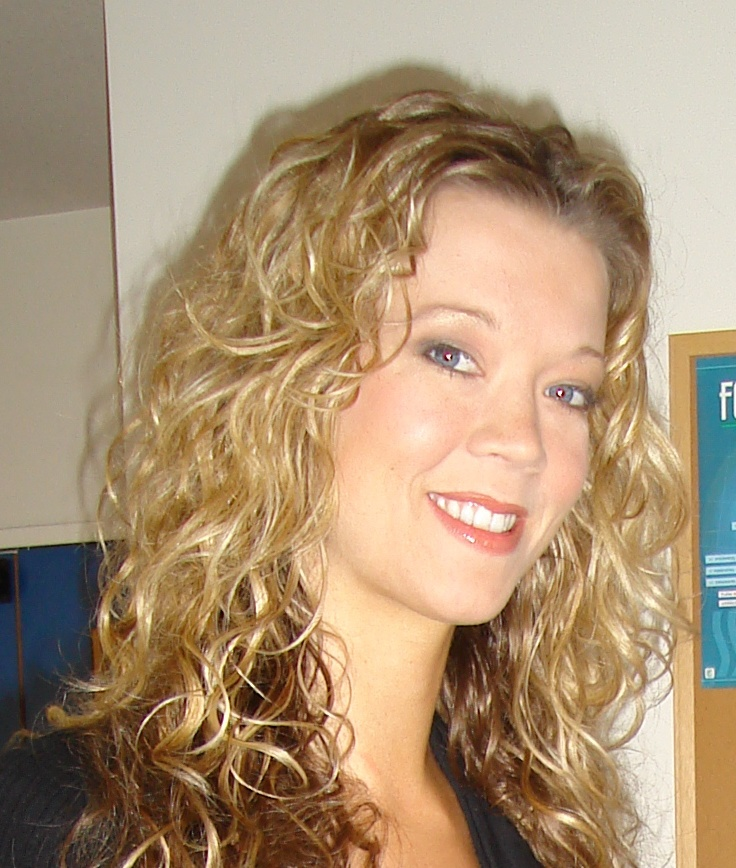
- Alexis Skye, Iceland, 2006
- Born: August 28, 1974 (age 52); Chandler, Arizona, United States
- Occupation: Model
- Years active: 1986–present
- Modeling information
- Height: 1.96 m (6 ft 5 in)
- Hair color: Blonde
- Eye color: Blue

Alexis Skye (born August 28, 1974) is an American model. Standing 6 ft 5 in (196 cm) tall, Alexis Skye was crowned in 2008 by the Guinness World Records as the "World's Tallest Fashion and Bikini model." Alexis has appeared at various events like Arnold Classic, Amazon Fest, Kaikura Tall Pageant and GlamourCon (LA and Chicago). As of 2013, she is the spokesmodel for Gamma O Health Supplements.

Skye was born measuring 24 in. By the age of 16, she was 6 ft 4 in. Over the next few years, at age 18–19, she gained another inch making her 6 ft 5 in with a size 13 shoe.

Skye has appeared on two television shows. In Secret Lives of Women, she was interviewed about how life is being a very tall woman. The episode was entitled Size Matters: Tall, Small, and Extra Large. She appeared in My Name Is Earl as the character Too Tall Maggie.
