= Alexis Loizidis =

Greek footballer

Personal information
- Full name: Alexis Loizidis
- Date of birth: 26 June 1985 (age 41)
- Height: 1.76 m (5 ft 9 in)
- Positions: Right back; right winger

Senior career*
Years	Team	Apps	(Gls)
2003–2005	Atromitos Piraeus	42	(10)
2005	Ionikos FC	1	(0)
2006	→ Keratsini	10	(0)
2006–2007	→ AO Thiva	11	(0)
2007–2009	Ionikos FC	11	(0)
- * Club domestic league appearances and goals as of 24 May 2009

Alexis Loizidis (Greek: Αλέξης Λοϊζίδης; born 26 June 1985) is a football defender.

== Career ==
Loizidis began playing football with Atromitos Piraeus, where he played 42 matches and scored 10 goals in the Delta Ethniki. In January 2005, he joined Ionikos F.C. and made one substitute's appearance in the Alpha Ethniki. In August 2005, he was loaned to Keratsini FC where he played 10 matches in Gamma Ethniki and in August 2006 he was loaned to Thiva F.C. where he played 11 matches in Gamma Ethniki.
