= Alan Teulon =

British chartered surveyor (1934–2025)

Alan Edward Teulon, MBE (21 June 1934 – 2 July 2025) was a British chartered surveyor.

== Life and career ==
Teulon was born in Enfield on 21 June 1934, one of the eighth generation descended from Antoine Teulon, a Huguenot refugee from the south of France who came to England and settled in Greenwich in 1689. He was a great great great nephew of architect Samuel Sanders Teulon.

Training as a chartered surveyor and working as a land surveyor in Jamaica for 9 years, he became a planning officer in South Wales and then was Head of Countryside Services in Northamptonshire for 25 years, developing the Pocket Parks initiative in 1984 which was subsequently supported nationally by the Countryside Commission. He was awarded the MBE in the 2000 New Year Honours for services to the Millennium Greens Initiative and to Countryside Management in Northamptonshire. He was a member of the Dave Burman Jazz Group which played at the 1956 Sopot Jazz Festival in Poland, a revival of Polish jazz culture that began at the height of the Cold War.

In 2022 he was awarded the Jamaica Badge of Honour for Meritorious Service – Honorary Award for Notable Contribution to the History of Jamaica.

Teulon died on 2 July 2025, at the age of 91.

== Publications ==
- The life and work of Samuel Sanders Teulon Victorian architect (2009)
- Victorian Thorney: The Remodelling of a Fenland Village (2001) Jema Publications ISBN 978-1-871468-09-0
- Organising countryside events (1991) Countryside Commission, Great Britain ISBN 978-0-86170-286-2
