= Alexis Guérin (footballer) =

French footballer (born 2000)

Personal information
- Date of birth: 5 August 2000 (age 26)
- Place of birth: Le Creusot, France
- Height: 1.69 m (5 ft 7 in)
- Position: Midfielder

Team information
- Current team: Bulle
- Number: 6

Senior career*
Years	Team	Apps	(Gls)
2018	FBBP II	1	(0)
2018–2019	Montceau	5	(1)
2019–2023	Servette U21	28	(9)
2019–2023	Servette	1	(0)
2021–2022	→ Stade Nyonnais (loan)	1	(0)
2023	Grand-Saconnex	12	(3)
2023–2024	Biel-Bienne	17	(0)
2024–	Bulle	20	(0)
- * Club domestic league appearances and goals as of 22 June 2025

Alexis Guérin (French pronunciation: [alɛksi ɡeʁɛ̃]; born 5 August 2000) is a French footballer who plays as a midfielder for Swiss club Bulle.

== Professional career ==
Guérin made his professional debut with Servette FC in a 3–1 Swiss Super League loss to FC Lugano on 31 July 2020.
