= Alexis Arts =

Italian escapologist

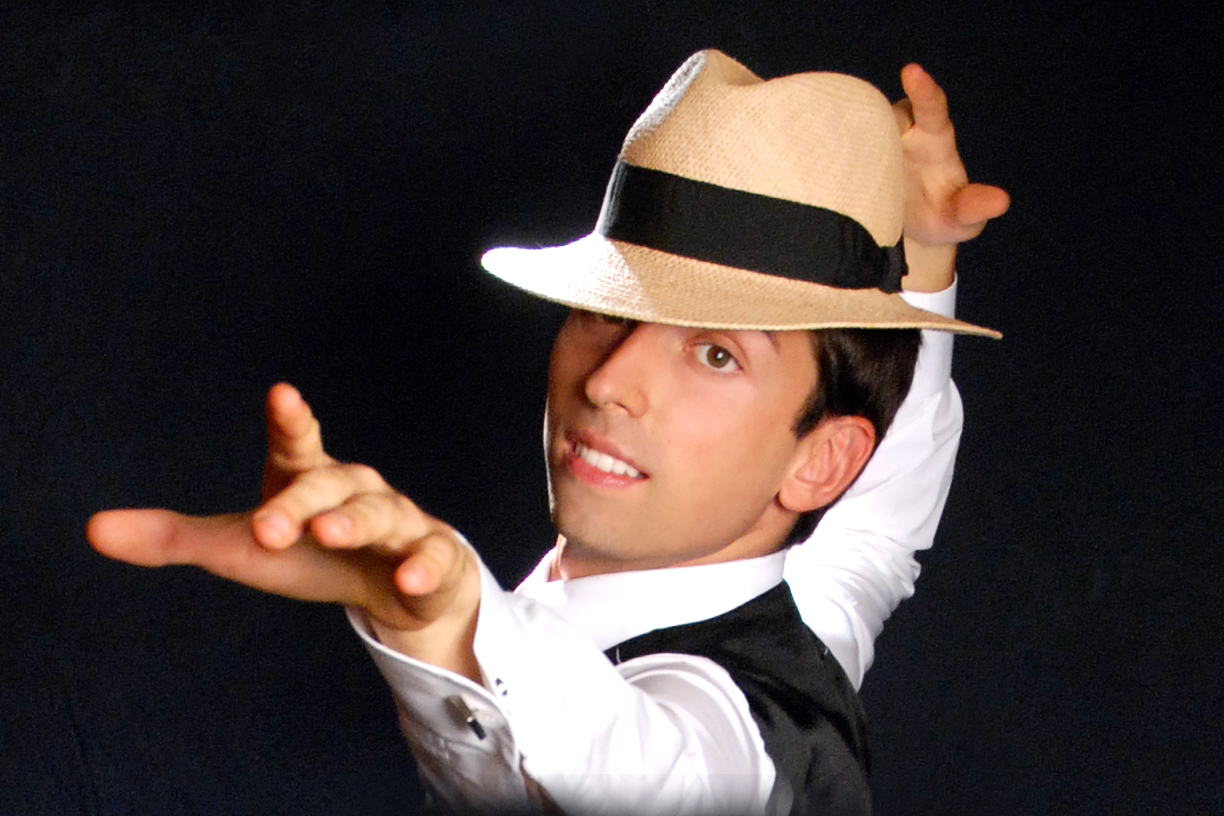
- Alexis Arts
- Born: Danilo Audiello; May 5, 1986 (age 40); Foggia, Italy
- Occupations: illusionist, escapologist, actor, dancer, creative director (theatre)
- Years active: 1992–present
- Website: http://www.alexisarts.it

Alexis Arts, aka Danilo Audiello (Born in Foggia, Italy, 5 May 1986), is an Italian illusionist, actor, dancer, and creative director in the theatre world. He is currently the fastest escapologist in the world. His shows mix artistic illusionism with mentalism and other disciplines such as dance, transformation (quick-change), mime, theatre, Chinese shadow artistry, and martial arts. As such he could be defined not only as a magician, but as an all round entertainer trained in numerous fields. His passion is to combine these skills in order to create different atmospheres and characters that tell moving, unexpected stories—stories which make audiences question their perceptions of reality. As such Arts refers to himself as a "fantasist"—dedicated to building surreal spectacles and stories that both move and perplex the viewer.

One of his most notable achievements to date, is that he has broken 6 Guinness World Records. These are for the fastest escape from a pair of handcuffs, fastest escape from a straitjacket, the Largest Card Illusion Reveal. and the Largest Mentalist Mnemonics Book Test.

Alexis won the award of the European Championship of Magic, 2014 in the category of Big Stage Illusions with his Prison Break act. His latest achievement was the World Championship of Magic FISM 2015, in which the Prison Break act was awarded as the best in the category of Big Stage Illusions bringing the title to Italy again after 40 years.

== Early life ==
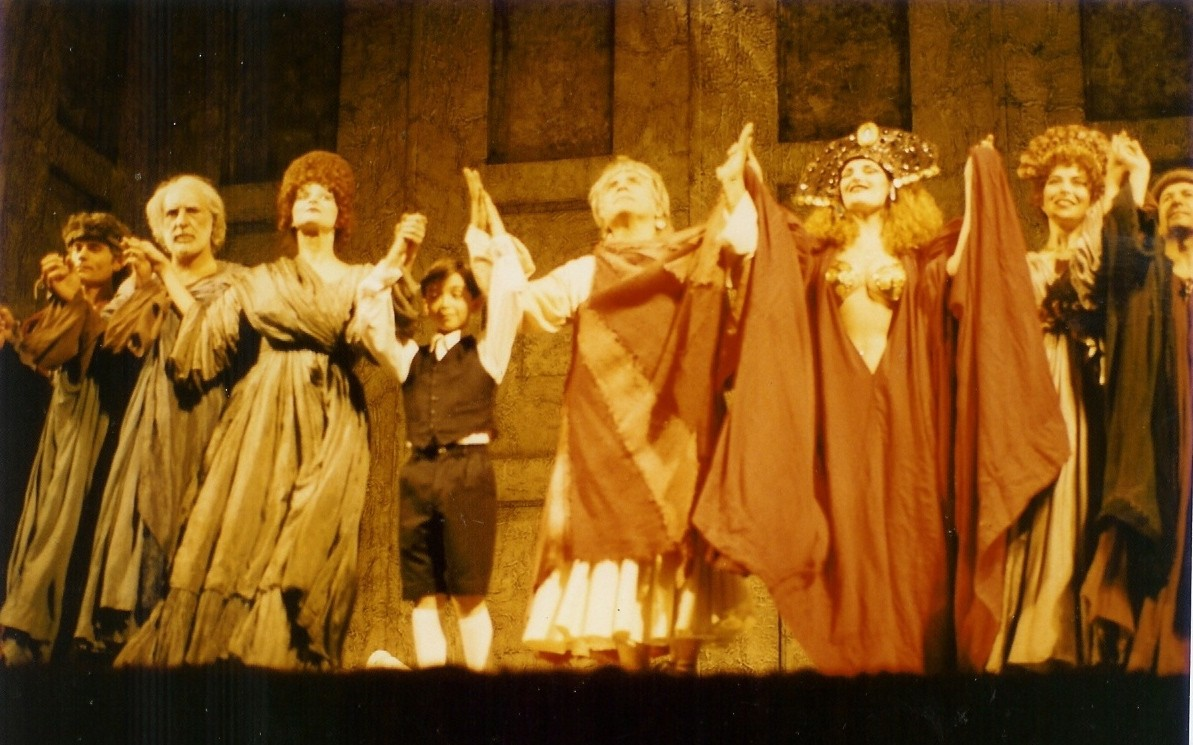
Illusionist Alexis Arts as a child actor with Tato Russo in Shakespeare's, 'A Comedy of Errors'.

Arts was born into a family with a strongly artistic and theatrical background. His father was an illusionist and engineer, from whom Arts learnt many magical skills from a young age. Off stage, Alexis was an exceptional achiever at school, displaying a strong aptitude for mathematics — a skill which has been a contributing factor in how he has able to invent his original illusions and mind power stunts.

Arts began his on-stage acting career at the age of 5, acting for two years alongside the respected Italian actor and theatre director, Tato Russo in Shakespeare's A Comedy of Errors. At five, Arts first exhibited his magical skills in an improvised section within a theatrical show. Then, a year later he began studying ballet, which would later form a key component of his stage shows. Growing up in these artistic fields, his talents were cultivated and allowed to develop through exposure to many experienced performers, one being leading quick-change actor Arturo Brachetti.

== Work as a Creative Director ==
Arts worked as the creative director for the hit musical 'Aladin', with the music of the band Pooh - one of the most popular bands in Italy. During this time his duties included developing special effects for the show, including a flying carpet (with two people on board) for this much talked about show that appeared on national news and was frequently sold-out.

Arts also worked on the theatre adaptation of Cartoon Network's Ben 10 The Musical. For this Arts interpreted other-worldly cartoons and aliens for the live stage. He used quick-changes, disappearance illusions, and pyrotechnic skills to create flame-shooting and flying alien characters.

In addition to such productions, Arts has also developed special on-stage effects as creative director for the world tour of the Italian singer, Gigi D'Alessio.

== Awards ==
=== Taormina Film Festival Video mapping Creativity Award 2016 ===
The first movie creators were magicians and Alexis brought magic and cinema together again. In the 62nd edition of the Taormina Film Festival, presided by Tiziana Rocca and held in the 8,000-seat open-air ancient Greek theater, Alexis showcased a new interactive show combining magic with film, from the magic projection bouquet with Ross Ashton. The interactive video mapping performance was celebrated with the creativity award.

=== Award of Friendship and Collaboration, Shanghai 2015 ===
In the British Cultural Centre of Shanghai Jiao Tong University in China, Alexis delivered his lecture on Perception and Deception in Decision Making and received the award of friendship and collaboration.

=== Les Mandrakes D'Or Award 2015 ===
In the international festival of Les Mandrakes d'Or in Paris, presented in Théâtre du Casino à Enghin-les-Bains, Théâtre Thierry Le Luron au Raincy and the Théâtre Bobino, Alexis received the Oscar equivalent for the world of magic presenting his Trilogy: a show of crime, passion and mystery in October 2015.

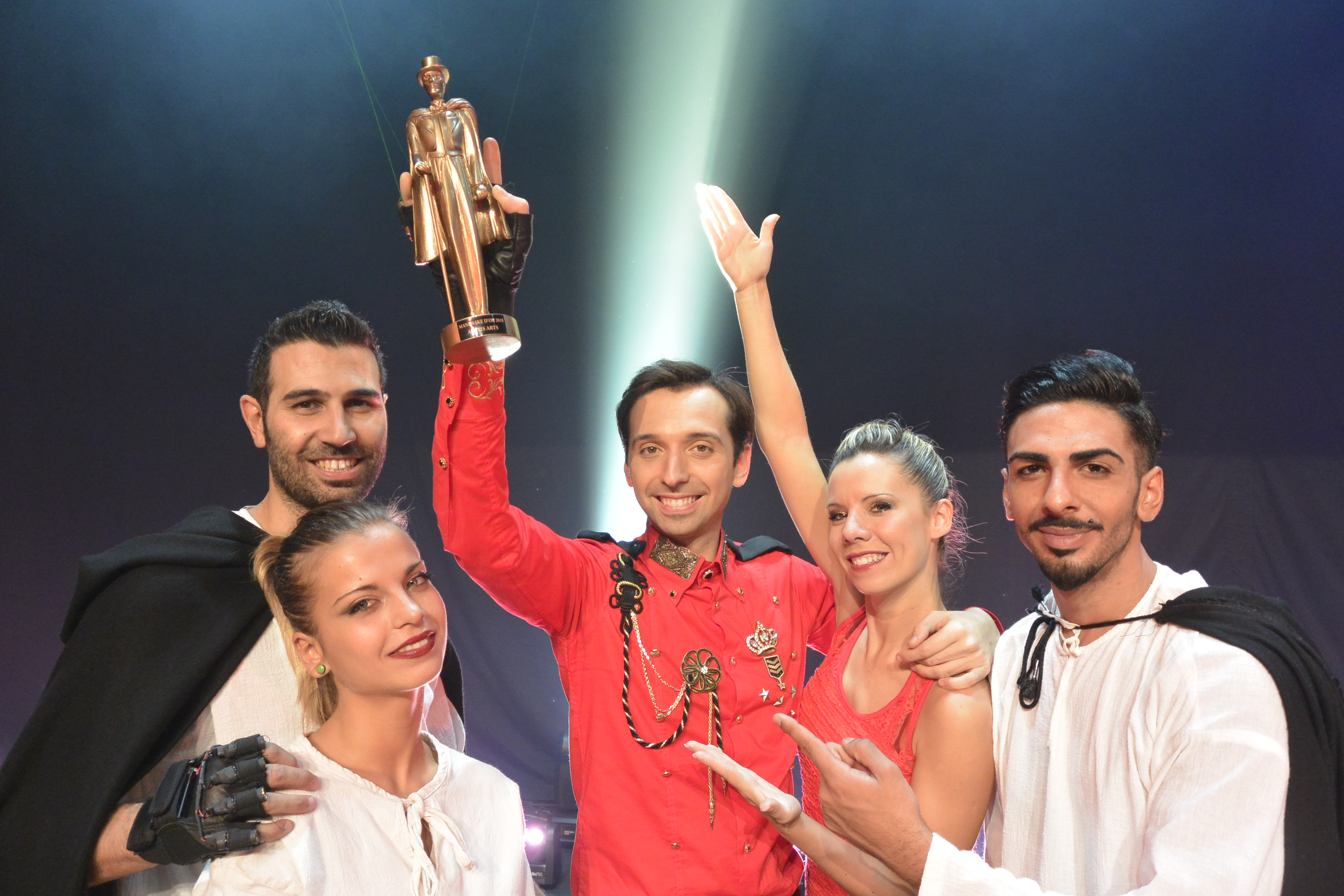
Alexis Arts receiving the Mandrakes d'Or award in the Bobino Theater in Paris

=== World Championship of Magic FISM 2015 ===
The 26th World Championship of Magic was held in Rimini Italy, where Alexis presented the latest version of his Prison Break escape act, winning the Best Big Stage Illusions award.

=== Award of Recognition ANFE 2015 ===
In the prestigious chamber of the Cambridge Union, the president of the International Association of Italians Around the World, Matteo Iacovelli, awarded Alexis for promoting the Italian culture through his creative, innovative and philanthropic contributions.

=== European Championship FISM 2014 ===
In the ECM 2014, organised by FFAP (Fédération Française des Artistes Prestidigitateurs) Alexis won the Best Big Stage Illusions award with his escapology show of Prison Break.

=== Cambridge University Magic Society Honorary Award ===
Hosted in the Engineering Department of the University of Cambridge, the award ceremony celebrated the contributions of Alexis to the Magic Society.

=== Argos Hippium Honorary Award ===
The committee of the Argos Hippium Onlus in August 2014 presented an award of excellence to Alexis for his international actions and impact.

== Guinness World Records Broken ==
=== Fastest Escape from Handcuffs ===
Alexis' first record was broken on 29 May 2009 when he performed and elaborated upon several of Harry Houdini's famous stunts. Arts escaped the handcuffs in 2.16 seconds. In 2014 he broke the record again, escaping this time in 0.91 seconds from a pair of double locked handcuffs.

=== Fastest Escape from Straitjacket ===
Broken 29 May 2009 during Arts' show in Foggia's "Pino Zaccheria" stadium, in which he hung upside down from a great height by a burning rope. Arts escaped the straitjacket in 10.54 seconds, and also repeated the performance in Las Vegas. In 2014 Alexis broke this record again escaping from a posey straitjacket in 2.84 seconds.

=== Largest Card Illusion Reveal ===
Broken with architectural projection artist, Ross Ashton, on 22 February 2014 in the grounds of Cambridge University's Sidney Sussex College as part of the Cambridge e-Luminate Festival 2014. As part of the first Light Mob in history, two passers-by selected a card each at random, and after a magical light projection show in which Arts interacted with the projection on the college facade, Arts revealed the selected cards on the wall as giant projections measuring 128.25 square metres for the show finale.

=== Largest Mentalist Mnemonics Book Test ===
In the prestigious library of the University of Cambridge, Alexis challenged two researchers to a mentalist book test, inviting them to choose a random phrase among the collection of 5000 books of the Keynes rare collections room. The reveal of that phrase broke the Guinness World record of the Largest Mentalist Mnemonics Book test.

== Other Activities ==
=== Academia ===
Arts' interest in mathematics led him to study Economics. He graduated from the University of Foggia with a record score of 110, and has successfully completed his PhD studies with a Doctorate of Philosophy in Economics. His specialist field of interest is the study of illusion as a component part of any economy - an area which he is currently researching and developing.

=== Charity ===
Alexis is currently residing in Cambridge, United Kingdom and is actively supporting a collection of charities including Muscular Dystrophy UK, Cancer Research UK, the Cambridge RAG and the Teenage Cancer Trust. As for his contributions in Italy, along with Italian presenter, Paolo Bonolis, and the singer Arisa, Arts is a recognised supporter of the Italian charity Ce.RS ONLUS, a free scheme aiming to provide health care and social support to all those families who care for children with special needs. In this role he has created magical, theatrical events dedicated to supporting the charity's 'Adopt an Angel' project. He also collaborated with Paolo Bonolis in 2011 to provide voiceover work for the charity's TV spot.
