= Alexis Martin =

Alexis Martin may refer to:

- Alexis Martin (gymnast) (born 1994), French acrobatic gymnast
- Alexis Martin (actor) (born 1964), Canadian actor and writer
- Alexis Martin (musician), Canadian musician and composer
- Alexis Martín Arias (born 1992), Argentine footballer

== See also ==
- Alexis St. Martin (1802–1880), Canadian voyageur
