= Alexis González (Argentine footballer) =

Argentine footballer

Personal information
- Full name: Alexis Jonathan González
- Date of birth: 13 January 2005 (age 21)
- Place of birth: Posadas, Misiones, Argentina
- Height: 1.81 m (5 ft 11 in)
- Position: Striker

Team information
- Current team: River Plate

Youth career
- Atlético Posadas
- 2016–2024: River Plate

Senior career*
Years	Team	Apps	(Gls)
2024–	River Plate	0	(0)
2024	→ Godoy Cruz (loan)	0	(0)
2025	→ Audax Italiano (loan)	8	(1)
2026	→ Sarmiento (loan)	2	(0)
- * Club domestic league appearances and goals as of 16:24, 29 September 2026 (UTC)

Alexis Jonathan González (born 13 January 2005) is an Argentine footballer who plays as a striker for Argentine Primera División club River Plate.

== Club career ==
Born in Posadas, Argentina, González was trained at Atlético Posadas before joining the River Plate youth system in 2016. Having stood out as a goalscorer for both the youth and reserve teams, he was loaned out to Godoy Cruz in September 2024.

In January 2025, González moved to Chile and joined on loan to Audax Italiano in the Chilean Primera División on a deal for a year with an option to buy. He made his debut in the 0–0 away draw against Unión Española for the 2025 Copa Chile on 21 March. He made his first appearance in the Chilean Primera División in the 2–0 win against the same opponent on 19 April, scoring the second goal at the minute 90+7.

Back to Argentina, González was loaned out to Sarmiento de Junín.
