= Alexis Rodríguez =

Alexis Rodríguez may refer to:

- Alexis Rodríguez (cyclist), Spanish cyclist
- Alexis Rodríguez (footballer), Argentine footballer
- Alexis Rodríguez (wrestler), Cuban wrestler
- Lexi Rodriguez, American volleyball player
