= Alexis Quezada =

American soccer player

Personal information
- Full name: Alexis Quezada Cardenas
- Date of birth: May 2, 1997 (age 29)
- Place of birth: Chicago, Illinois, United States
- Height: 5 ft 10 in (1.78 m)
- Position: Midfielder

Team information
- Current team: Jarabacoa FC
- Number: 10

Youth career
- –2014: Chicago Fire
- 2014: Deportivo Cuenca
- 2020–2021: Leixões

Senior career*
Years	Team	Apps	(Gls)
2017	Venados Premier		
2018–2019	Celaya Premier		
2021	Fafe B	10	(3)
2022	Xanthi	1	(0)
2023	Gualaceo	0	(0)
2024–2025	Estrela da Amadora	9	(0)
2025–	Jarabacoa FC	9	(0)
- * Club domestic league appearances and goals

Alexis Quezada Cardenas (born May 2, 1997) is an American professional soccer player who plays as a midfielder for Dominican club Jarabacoa FC.

== Personal life ==
Quezada was born in Chicago, Illinois, and was raised most of his life in West Chicago. Attending Wegner Elementary School, Leman Middle School and West Chicago Community High School.

== Club career ==
=== W.C United Wildcats ===
Quezada first participated in his local club soccer team, W.C United Wildcats which stands for West Chicago United Wildcats.

=== Chicago Fire ===
After playing a short time with his high school program, Quezada was invited to a tryout with Chicago Fire youth academy in the Major League Soccer. Spending years in the clubs youth academy and developing.

=== Deportivo Cuenca ===
In 2014 Quezada transferred to Deportivo Cuenca (youth academy) of the Serie A at just 16 years of age which he mentioned as having an exceptional infrastructure for developing young players in their system. Alexis attracted interest from a number of clubs, and eventually Deportivo Cuenca won the race for his signature in February 2014. Toluca was close in 2013 but passport problems prevented him from playing in Mexico.

=== Club Venados ===
On July 6, 2016, Quezada received his Mexican nationality and was joining Mexican side Venados F.C. of Ascenso MX. Not playing much of his time due to injuries on his ankle. He did help Cantera Venados obtain their first championship title in their institution youth system.

=== Club Celaya ===
Before the second half of 2017–18, Quezada joined Celaya in the Ascenso MX now called Liga de Expansión MX.

=== Leixões S.C. ===
In 2020, it was announced that Quezada signed with Segunda Liga Portugal side Leixões. Debuting against Boavista on December 18, 2021, in Estádio do Bessa. He was also part of Leixões very talented side Liga Revelação under-23 squad who were one victory away of becoming champions before losing against Estoril 2–0. The match was terminated after a massive brawl occurred between both sides with minutes remaining.

=== AD Fafe ===
In 2021, he joined Portuguese club side Fafe in Liga 3 (Portugal)

=== Xanthi F.C. ===
Alexis was officially signed to historic Greek club side Xanthi. On April 10, 2022, he debuted for Xanthi in a 0–0 draw with Panserraikos in the Super League 2.

=== Gualaceo S.C. ===
Alexis signed for Ecuadorian Serie A team Gualaceo S.C.on January 23, 2023. He never made an official debut for Gualaceo before leaving the club in July 2023.

=== Estrela Da Amadora ===
On August 2, 2024, Quezada completed a transfer to Portuguese Primeira Liga side Estrela Amadora, signing a one-year contract.

=== Jarabacoa FC ===
Liga Dominicana de Fútbol side Jarabacoa FC announced the signing of Quezada on August 9, 2025. His arrival in the Dominican Republic was cheered as a breakthrough, both on and off the field, and he was credited with helping to grow the sport and the league in the country.

== International career ==
Quezada is eligible to represent the United States, Ecuador, and Mexico internationally through birth and ancestry.
