= Aleix Clapés =

Spanish painter (1850–1920)

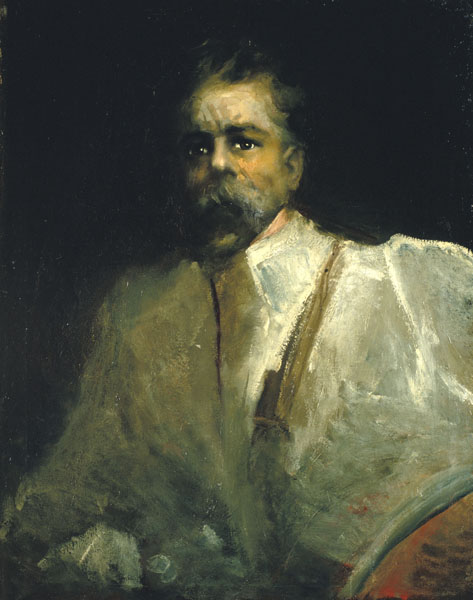
- self portrait
- Born: Aleix Clapés i Puig; 1850; Vilassar de Dalt, Catalonia, Spain
- Died: 1920 (aged 69–70); Barcelona, Catalonia, Spain
- Education: Escola de la Llotja
- Known for: Painting
- Movement: modernisme

Alex Clapés (Vilassar de Dalt, September 10, 1850 – Barcelona, 1920) was a Catalan modernisme artist. He was one of the less known painters in the late 19th century and early 20th century in Catalonia, Spain. He was born in Vilassar de Dalt on September 10, 1850. He died in Barcelona in 1920. He is most known for performing some commissions for the Güell family, thanks to his friend and colleague, Antoni Gaudí.

== Early life ==
Clapés was born in Vilassar de Dalt, Catalonia, in 1850. Very little information is known about his personal life. He was the youngest child in a large family. He was the son of Villa Teresa Puig and Antonio Pons Clapés. He was primarily raised in Vilassar. Later, he married Gumersinda, a woman from Rues. She was a widow who was originally married to Mariano Ferré Bergues and had two children. Clapés and Gumersinda later had a daughter together, Teresa.

== Education ==
When he lived in Reus, Spain, he found his mentor and fellow painter Franco Hernandez. With a good understanding of the basic artistic skills, he went to Barcelona where he enrolled in the Escola de la Llotja where he learned from Claudi Lorenzale. Majority of Aleix Clapés' works were in opposition of Claudio Lorenzale, which led to Clapés being one of Lorenzale's favorite students. Lorenzale was active in a group called the Natzaren painters, which was a group of German painters who were led religiously by Frederick Overbeck. Clapés was a primary disciple of Friedrich Overbeck and was later appointed professor at the Escola de la Llotja.

Clapés later went to Paris, France to further his education where he became a pupil of Eugène Carrière. It also is assumed that Clapés took lessons at the Academy of the Palette Utrillo.

He moved to Uruguay and Rome. Where he worked on mural painting techniques. He also studied the works of Michelangelo and Raphael.

Clapés’ best professional years occurred at the turn of the century. He received a minimal amount of social recognition during this time period. These accomplishments allowed him to purchase a home in the Rambla de Catalonia. He also opened a store, where he sold perfumes, gifts, and art objects.

== Inspiration ==
The amount of artwork in the late 19th and early 20th centuries were rich in Catalonia, including such artists as Santiago Rusiñol, Ramon Casas, Antonio Gaudi, and Lluis Domenech i Montaner. Many of these people were colleagues as well as competitors in the art world with Clapés.

Much of Clapés’ art brought individuals closer to spirituality, mysticism, and prevailing. He quickly gained confidence. Much of his style displayed had been influenced by Overbeck. He had a very colorful palette, closest to El Greco than to Overbeck.

The public's lack of interest eventually blossomed into public recognition. His talent did not go unnoticed and quickly entered the studio of S. Juan Hernandez. He specialized in drawings and paintings, who from the outset was considered one of the best and most gifted students.

== Career ==
=== Expo and Gaudi relationship ===
Clapés participated in an expo in 1888, where he began a close relationship with Antoni Gaudí. Gaudi hired him to work on the decoration of the Palau Güell in 1851. Where, he also held the position of director from 1858 to 1885. Clapés received notoriety for contributing to the paintings that decorated the halls of the palace and the great mural painting which occupied part of the front side.

Despite his participation in important projects, such as the Palau Güell and La Pedrera, he enjoyed the minor recognition that his talent deserved. Antoni Gaudi's success seem to cloud Clapés' success in the involvement of these projects. Although, Gaudi's success also introduced Clapés to many opportunities that he may not have had without his close relationship with Gaudi.

=== Furniture ===
Clapés artistic abilities did not limit him to painting. He also excelled in designing carpets and furniture. This included close collaboration with Ibars Josep Ribas, a furniture maker and decorator, including furnishing designs for the Asylum Hospital de Sant Pau.

During the construction of Palau Güell, Clapés also "created cabinet doors inserts, including twelve copper plates that contained the representation of apostles, one of whom is believed to be his self-portrait. In the living room are also his paintings that occupy the four corners the room. These are large-scale works and innovative aesthetics that stand to adapt perfectly to the unique architecture Gaudí proposed by tracing angles and beams of the room."

=== Magazine ===
Clapés established and worked at the Magazine Hispania from 1899 to 1902. The Magazine Hispania was published bimonthly to display modern art and literature. During this time, Clapés was relatively popular. He made many commissions for the wealthy people. However, he was only able to keep it open until 1903 due to the expensive method of printing.

=== Literary competition ===
On August 14, 1887, a literary contest was held in Vilassar de Mar. An announcement was made on May 22, 1887, including the deadline for submission on July 31, 1887. Vilassar had adopted the model of the Floral Games of Barcelona as a catalyst for revitalization of the Catalan culture. The compositions were to be unpublished and original. It was the first organized event in Vilassar de Mar. The review panel was composed of Eduard Vidal Valenciano, Damasus Calvet, Angel Guimera, and Valentine Admiral Frederic Soler. Aleix Clapés won a prize for the best poem about "The Latin sea." It was read by Damas Calvet.

== Artworks ==
It appears that Aleix Clapés’ first works was the portrait of a famous poet, Joaquim Maria Bartins. It was later exhibited at the Reading Center of Rues. It is currently on display at the Rues City Hall. The portrait was painted during a time when Joaquim Maria Bartins was ill. It portrayed much of her pain and suffering during this time of illness. The portrait received great reviews by Lo Somatent, which was the first newspaper to be printer in Catalan Rues.

He also painted a painting of Hercules on the exterior of the east side of the Palau Guell. Hercules was the mythical founder of Barcelona. Guell had an infatuation with Hercules. Hercules was present on the lateral wall parallel to the La Rambla in a large painting by Aleix Clapés. He also painted The Rapture on the walls of Palau Güell, where Hercules, the hero, had been portrayed as the main protagonist.

He also painted El Prisionero. The English translation is "The Prisoner". It was charcoal drawing on the Civil War in Uruguay. He also painted El Peon (English translation: "The Pawn"). It was purchased by Trotsky in Paris in 1920 for 2,000,000 francs, which was France's currency prior to the euro. It was then taken to Kremlin. Trotsky was the organizer of the Red Army and advocated for forced military drafts.

Clapés' Hercules Searching for the Hesperides was painted with oil on canvas circa 1890. It was donated to Museu Nacional d'Art de Catalunya by Maria Lluisa Guell in 1928, but as of January 2016 is on loan to the Palau Güell. It has been selected for the project "Partage Plus – Digitising and Enabling Art Nouveau for Europeana".

Allegory of Doctor Robert was painted with oil on canvas circa 1890–1902. It was donated to Museu Nacional d’Art de Catalunya by Pere Mila Camps in 1933 and is displayed at the Museu Nacional d’Art de Catalunya.

Clapés' Self-Portrait was painted with oil on canvas circa 1902. It was purchased by the Museu Nacional d’Art de Catalunya in 1954. It has been selected for the project "Partage Plus – Digitising and Enabling Art Nouveau for Europeana".

Portrait of Manuel Dalmau Oliveres (1864–1923) is an oil painting on canvas circa 1915–1919. It was donated to Museu Nacional d’Art de Catalunya by Albert Bernis in 1942. It is on display at the Museu Nacional d’Art de Catalunya. It has also been selected for the project "Partage Plus – Digitising and Enabling Art Nouveau for Europeana".

Clapés' Saint Isabel Offering the Queen’s Crown to a Beggar is an oil painting on canvas circa 1890–1895. It was donated to Museu Nacional d’Art de Catalunya by Pere Mila I Camps in 1933. It is stored in the archives at the Museu Nacional d’Art de Catalunya. It has been selected for the project "Partage Plus – Digitising and Enabling Art Nouveau for Europeana."

Christ and Mary Magdalene is an oil painting on canvas circa 1890–1918. It was donated to Museu Nacional d’Art de Catalunya by Pere Mila I Camps in 1933. It is stored in the archives at the Museu Nacional d’Art de Catalunya. It has been selected for "Partage Plus – Digitising and Enabling Art Nouveau for Europeana".
