= Grand Duke Alexei Mikhailovich of Russia =

Youngest son of Grand Duke Michael Nicolaievich of Russia

Grand Duke Alexei Mikhailovich
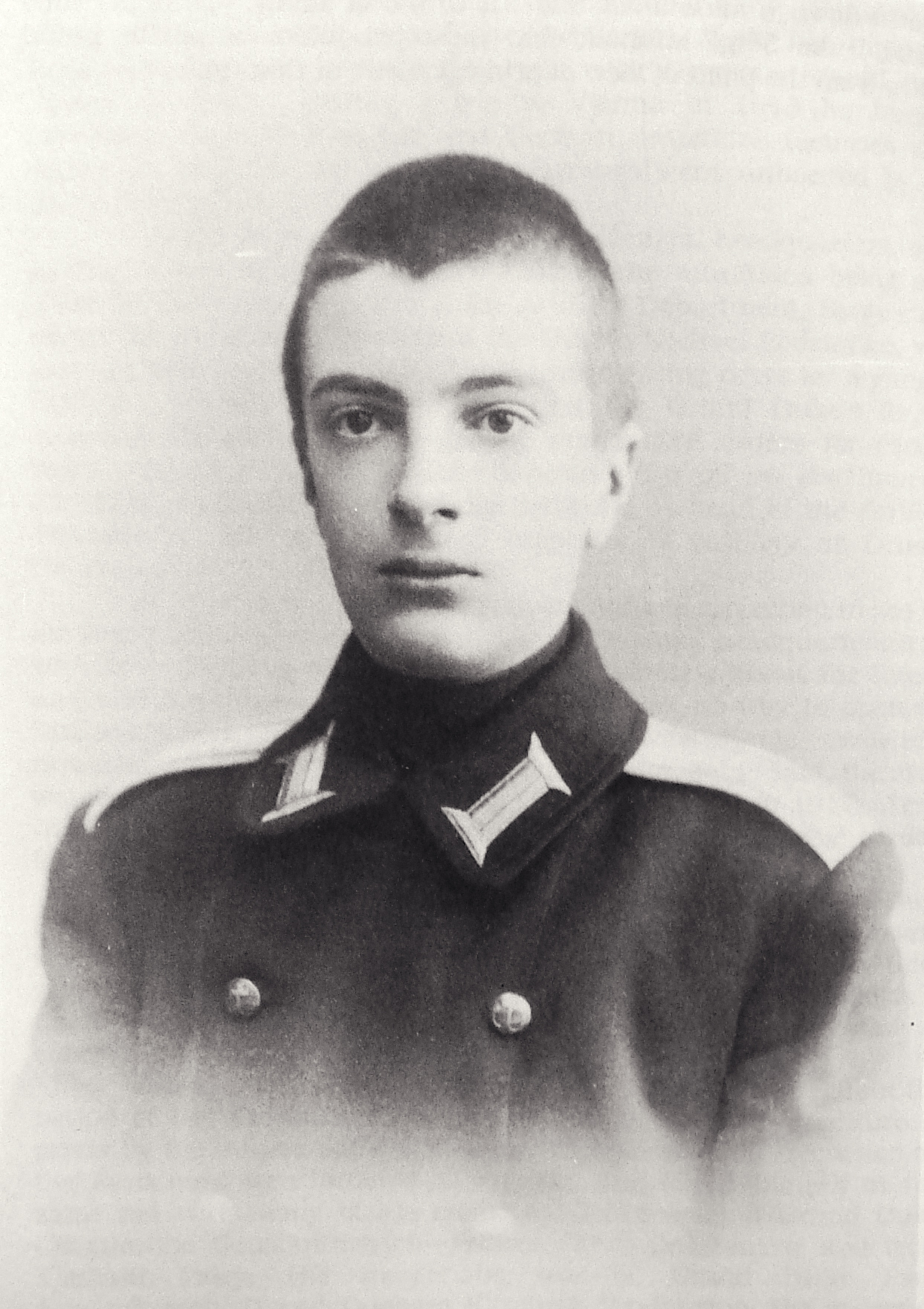
- Born: 28 December 1875; Tiflis, Tiflis Governorate, Russian Empire
- Died: 2 March 1895 (aged 19); Sanremo, Italy
- House: House of Holstein-Gottorp-Romanov
- Father: Grand Duke Michael Nikolaevich of Russia
- Mother: Princess Cecilie of Baden

Grand Duke Alexei Mikhailovich of Russia (Russian: Алексей Михайлович) (28 December 1875 – 2 March 1895) was the sixth son and youngest child of Grand Duke Michael Nicolaievich of Russia and a first cousin of Alexander III of Russia. He was destined to follow a career in the Russian Navy, but he died in his youth of tuberculosis.

== Life ==
Grand Duke Alexei Mikhailovich of Russia was born in Tiflis on 28 December 1875, the sixth son and last child of the seven children of Grand Duke Michael Nicolaievich of Russia and his wife Grand Duchess Olga Feodorovna, born Princess Cecile of Baden. He was the cadet member of the Mikhailovichi branch of the Romanov family and the only Grand Duke to bear the name and patronymic of a Tsar: Alexei Mikhailovich of Russia.

Grand Duke Alexei Mikhailovich of Russia spent his early childhood in Georgia while his father was the Governor-General of Russian provinces of Transcaucasia. Alexei was seven years old in 1882 when his father was named as President of the Council of the Empire and the whole family moved to St. Petersburg. At the age of eight, he attended a ceremony in the winter Palace and was interested in seeing all the foreign uniforms, particularly the one from the oriental envoys. As all the male members of the Romanov family, Alexei was destined to follow a military career. He received a Spartan upbringing that included sleeping in army cots and taking cold baths and was educated at home by private tutors. His father, occupied in military and governmental endeavors, remained a distant figure. His mother was a strict disciplinarian and the dominating force in the family. Alexei was brought up strictly and was overwhelmed by his older brothers. He yearned the company of children of his own age and frequently played with Emperor Alexander III’s youngest children, Michael and Olga.

A brilliant boy of liberal heart and absolute sincerity, according to his brother Alexander, Alexei was intelligent and lively. At the age of eighteen, he was a tall; thin, good looking young man, always dressed in his uniform. He had almost completed his naval officer’s training when he came down with what appeared to be a chill but was really tuberculosis. His health had never been good. His cousin, Kiril would later say that Alexei’s father refused to let him recuperate, insisting that it was his duty to finish his training. Alexei’s condition became so severe that he was sent to San Remo, where he died on 2 March 1895. He was nineteen years old. “The first time he wore his midshipman’s uniform”, Kiril wrote, “was in his coffin.” His brother Alexander who wrote in his book of memoirs that he felt closer to Alexei than to any other member of his family, said that he did not regret his passing, because Alexei suffered acutely in the oppressive atmosphere of the palace and his early death perhaps spared him a worse fate.

== Ancestry ==
Ancestors of Grand Duke Alexei Mikhailovich of Russia

8. Paul I of Russia
4. Nicholas I of Russia
9. Sophie Dorothea of Württemberg
2. Grand Duke Michael Nicolaevich of Russia
10. Frederick William III of Prussia
5. Charlotte of Prussia
11. Louise of Mecklenburg-Strelitz
1. Grand Duke Alexei Mikhailovich of Russia
12. Charles Frederick, Grand Duke of Baden
6. Leopold, Grand Duke of Baden
13. Luise Karoline Geyer von Geyersberg
3. Princess Cecilie of Baden
14. Gustav IV Adolf of Sweden
7. Sophie of Sweden
15. Frederica of Baden

== Bibliography ==
- Alexander, Grand Duke of Russia, Once a Grand Duke, Cassell, London, 1932.
- Cockfield, Jamie H, White Crow, Praeger, 2002.
- Chavchavadze, David, The Grand Dukes, Atlantic, 1989, ISBN 0-938311-11-5
- Zeepvat, Charlotte, The Camera and the Tsars, Sutton Publishing, 2004, ISBN 0-7509-3049-7.
