= La Misma Gente (Venezuelan band) =

La Misma Gente is a Venezuelan rock band formed in the 1970s. Their best known hit is "Lluvia".
