= La Misma Gente (Colombian band) =

Colombian salsa music band

La Misma Gente is a Colombian salsa music band founded in 1978 in Palmira, 20 kilometros East of Cali, by Jorge Herrera, leader and timbalero, and keyboard player Jaime Henao. It became one of the emblematic Cali salsa groups alongside Grupo Niche and Orquesta Guayacán, although unlike these groups the group was originally local to Cali and had grown out of a mainly white high school band. The group's early records are modeled after the Puerto Rican sound of trumpet quartet led Sonora Poncena, which Henao had listened to as youth, although expanded with two saxophones and a trombone. The band's first successful songs were "Juanita Ae" and "Titico". Later hits include "Hasta Que Llegaste," and "No Hay Carretera". The vocalists have changed over the band's 30 years but on the 30 Aniversario DVD the vocalists are Rey Calderon and Nelson Morales.

== Discography ==
- En su Salsa (Sonolux, 1986)
- La Misma Gente Orquesta (Sonolux, 1987)
- Suena (Sonolux, 1988)
- En la Jugada (Sonolux, 1989)
- Perfume De París (Combo Records, 1990)
- El Loco, Ah tu sabes! (Combo Records, 1991)
- Cambios (Combo Records, 1992)
- Caliche (Codiscos, 1993)
- Siempre (Codiscos, 1994)
- Nos Quedamos Con La Salsa (Codiscos, 1995)
- Caminantes (Fonocaribe, 1998)
- Con Sabor Internacional (Latino's & Co, 2001)
- 25 Aniversario (Latino's & Co, 2004)
- 30 Aniversario, Pasado y Presente (Discos Fuentes, 2012)
- Mi promesa Single (Discos Fuentes, 2013)
- Llevao Single (Discos Fuentes, 2014)
