= Alexis Giraud-Teulon =

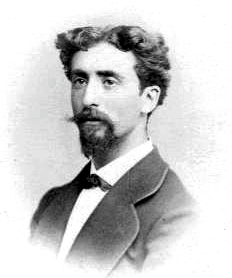
- Portrait of Alexis Giraud-Teulon in 1872
- Born: Marc Antoine Émile Alexis Giraud; 27 August 1839; Marseille, France
- Died: 30 May 1916 (aged 76); Antibes, France
- Occupations: Academic, lawyer, translator
- Father: Félix Giraud-Teulon

Signature
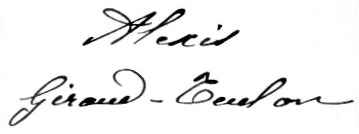

Marc Antoine Émile Alexis Giraud-Teulon, better known as Alexis Giraud-Teulon (27 August 1839, Marseille – 30 May 1916, Antibes), was a French academic, lawyer and translator.

== Biography ==
Son of Félix Giraud-Teulon, ophthalmologist, member of the Académie Nationale de Médecine and great-grandson of the conventional Marc Antoine Alexis Giraud, he belonged to a Protestant family from La Rochelle.

Licentiate in law, he became known by a series of publications on the history of institutions such as the mother among certain peoples of the antiquity. In 1874, he published a critical summary of Johann Jakob Bachofen's book, Das Mutterrecht (The Maternal Right, 1861), under the title Les Origines de la famille (The Origins of the Family), which was the most complete presentation, in French, of the doctrine of prehistoric matriarchy and its survivals.

He then taught philosophy of history, aesthetics and prehistory at the University of Geneva. He is credited with a translation of Geschichte der christlichen Kirche (History of the Christian Church, 1833), work of Ignaz von Döllinger, opponent of the dogma of papal infallibility. He also translated the posthumous work of Giovanni Alfonso Borelli, De Motu Animalium (On the Movement of Animals).

On December 23, 1863, he changed his last name from Giraud to Giraud-Teulon.

== Works ==
- La Mère chez certains peuples de l'antiquité (The Mother among Some Peoples of the Antiquity). Paris: Ernest Thorin, 1867.
- La Royauté et la Bourgeoisie (The Royalty and the Bourgeoisie). Paris. 1871.
- Les Origines du mariage et de la famille (The Origins of Marriage and the Family). Geneva: A. Cherbuliez, 1884.
- Double péril social : L'Église et le Socialisme (Double Social Peril: The Church and Socialism). Paris: Guillaumin, 1895.
- L'Exogamie chez les peuples primitifs (Exogamy among Primitive Peoples). Lyon: A. Rey, 1908.

== Sources ==
- Revue archéologique, ed. Edmond Pottier and Salomon Reinach, 5th series, t. III, Paris, Ernest Leroux, January–February 1916, p. 427.
