= Aleksejs =

Masculine given name

Aleksejs is a Latvian-language masculine given name.

People named Aleksejs include:

- Aleksejs Anufrijevs, Latvian basketball player
- Aleksejs Auziņš, Latvian footballer
- Aleksejs Jurjevs, Latvian cyclist
- Aleksejs Rumjancevs, Latvian canoer
- Aleksejs Šarando, Latvian footballer
- Aleksejs Saramotins, Latvian cyclist
- Aleksejs Semjonovs, Latvian footballer
- Aleksejs Širokovs, ice hockey player
- Aleksejs Vidavskis, Latvian politician
- Aleksejs Višņakovs, footballer
