= Alexis Marie Rivera =

Transgender advocate (1977–2012)

Alexis Marie Rivera (October 28, 1977 – March 28, 2012) was a transgender advocate and the first Case Manager and first Program Director for the Children's Hospital's transgender youth services program in Los Angeles. Rivera helped develop social services for the transgender community in Los Angeles in the 1990s and early 2000s, and later statewide programs in the late 2000s.

== Biography ==
Alexis Rivera was born and raised in Los Angeles, California, and began working doing street outreach to transgender women as a teen. When she was 18, she began to transition. She was hired at Children's Hospital Los Angeles (CHLA) initially as a general health educator, but began increasingly to focus on transgender youth who came to CHLA's Adolescent Medicine division. As a young woman, Rivera was also the first winner of Los Angeles long running Quest transgender advocacy pageant in 2002. Rivera helped build and grow the US's first transgender youth services program at CHLA from 1999 to 2007. She was also helped coordinate efforts to establish a network of social services for transgender people in Los Angeles, serving as a commissioner of the Los Angeles County HIV/AIDS Commission, a chair of the Transgender Services Provider Network, and a founding board member of FTM Alliance of Los Angeles (later Gender Justice LA), the first transgender led non profit organization in the region.

In 2007, Rivera joined the Transgender Law Center as a Policy Advocate. In this position, Rivera led the organizations statewide Health Care Access Project, which helped open clinics serving transgender people all over California. RIvera also helped train community members for California's first statewide Transgender Advocacy Day in 2010.

Rivera died on March 28, 2012, at the age of 34, from complications related to HIV/AIDS.

After her death, Rivera was memorialized in a mural in Clarion Alley in the Mission District, San Francisco. In Los Angeles, the transgender pride festival has named its award recognizing transgender advocates the "Alexis Rivera Trailblazer Award". The Alexis Project, a support network and service for HIV-infected trans women of color, was named after Rivera. The Alexis Rivera Courage-in-Leadership award, given by the APAIT Health Center in Los Angeles, was also named after Rivera.
