= Grand Duke Nicholas Mikhailovich of Russia =

Russian grand duke (1859–1919)

Grand Duke Nicholas Mikhailovich
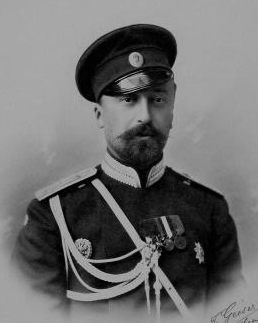
- Photograph, 1880s
- Born: 26 April 1859; Tsarskoye Selo, Saint Petersburg Governorate, Russian Empire
- Died: 28 January 1919 (aged 59); Petrograd, Russian Soviet Federative Socialist Republic
- Cause of death: Murder
- House: Holstein-Gottorp-Romanov
- Father: Grand Duke Michael Nikolaevich of Russia
- Mother: Princess Cecilie of Baden

Grand Duke Nicholas Mikhailovich of Russia (Russian: Великий князь Никола́й Миха́йлович; 26 April [O.S. 14 April] 1859 – 28 January 1919) was the eldest son of Grand Duke Michael Nikolaevich of Russia and a first cousin of Alexander III.

On 27 January 1919, Nicholas was moved to Peter and Paul Fortress in Petrograd, and in the early hours of the following day he was shot there by a firing squad, along with his brother, Grand Duke George Mikhailovich, and his cousins Grand Dukes Paul Alexandrovich and Dmitri Constantinovich.

According to historians Edvard Radzinsky, their executions had been ordered by Vladimir Lenin as retaliation for the recent summary executions of Karl Liebknecht and Rosa Luxemburg in Berlin, by Freikorps forces loyal to the Weimar Republic.

His brother Sandro described him in his memoirs as "a dreamer, a poet, a historian of out-and-out republican tendencies, a disillusioned bachelor worshipping the memory of his only love, the Queen of a Scandinavian country." This probably refers to Queen Victoria of Sweden, his maternal first cousin. According to Heribert Jansson's biography, they were in love and wished to marry, but could not, because the Russian Orthodox Church forbade unions between first cousins.

== Honours and awards ==
- Baden: Knight of the House Order of Fidelity, 1876
- Württemberg: Grand Cross of the Order of the Württemberg Crown, 1876
- Kingdom of Prussia: Pour le Mérite (military), 19 November 1878
- Grand Duchy of Hesse: Grand Cross of the Ludwig Order, 10 March 1886
- France: Grand Cross of the Legion of Honour, December 1894
- Denmark: Knight of the Order of the Elephant, 18 November 1897
- Austria-Hungary: Decoration of Honour for Arts and Sciences, 1908
- Sweden: Knight of the Order of the Seraphim, 12 May 1908

== Ancestry ==
Ancestors of Grand Duke Nicholas Mikhailovich of Russia

8. Paul I of Russia
4. Nicholas I of Russia
9. Sophie Dorothea of Württemberg
2. Grand Duke Michael Nikolaevich of Russia
10. Frederick William III of Prussia
5. Charlotte of Prussia
11. Louise of Mecklenburg-Strelitz
1. Grand Duke Nicholas Mikhailovich of Russia
12. Charles Frederick, Grand Duke of Baden
6. Leopold, Grand Duke of Baden
13. Luise Karoline Geyer von Geyersberg
3. Princess Cecilie of Baden
14. Gustav IV Adolf of Sweden
7. Sophie of Sweden
15. Frederica of Baden

== Bibliography ==
- Alexander, Grand Duke of Russia, Once a Grand Duke, Cassell, London, 1932.
- Chavchavadze, David, The Grand Dukes, Atlantic, 1989, ISBN 0-938311-11-5
- Cockfield, Jamie H. White Crow: The Life and Times of the Grand Duke Nicholas Mikhailovich Romanov 1859–1919. Praeger, 2002, ISBN 0-275-97778-1
- George, Grand Duchess of Russia, A Romanov Diary, Atlantic International Publications, 1988. ISBN 0-938311-09-3
- Hall, Coryne, Little mother of Russia, Holmes & Meier Publishers, Inc, 2001. ISBN 0-8419-1421-4
- Troyat, Henri, Tolstoy , Doubleday, 1967. ISBN 0-8021-3768-7
- Zeepvat, Charlotte, The Camera and the Tsars, Sutton Publishing, 2004, ISBN 0-7509-3049-7.
