= Raven (disambiguation) =

Raven is the common name given to several larger-bodied members of the passerine bird genus Corvus.

Raven may also refer to:

== Arts and entertainment ==
=== Fictional characters ===
- Raven (Ace Comics), a comic book character
- Raven (DC Comics), from the Teen Titans series
- Raven (Guilty Gear), in the Guilty Gear series
- Raven (Tekken), in the Tekken series
- Raven Baxter, title character of the American television series That's So Raven and its spinoff series, Raven's Home
- Raven Branwen, a character in the web series RWBY
- Raven Darkhölme, alter ego of Marvel Comics character Mystique
- Raven Hex, in Tarot: Witch of the Black Rose
- Raven Queen, the daughter of the Evil Queen from the Mattel franchise Ever After High
- Jonathon Raven, title character of the American action drama television series Raven
- Vulcan Raven, from the 1998 video game Metal Gear Solid
- Dmitri "Raven" Ravinoff, in the Neal Stephenson book Snow Crash
- Raven Reyes, in the television series The 100
- Mr. Raven, in George Macdonald's fantasy novel Lillith
- Raven, in the 2009 film My Queen Karo
- Raven, in The Black Company fantasy novel series
- Raven, in Graham Greene's novel A Gun for Sale (1936)
- Raven, in Faith Erin Hicks' novel Demonology 101
- Hari Seldon in Isaac Asimov's Foundation series, nicknamed "Raven"
- Raven, the Native American fable who accompanies Jack Horner in the Jack of Fables comic series
- Raven, in the manga series Pandora Hearts
- Raven, in the suspense/thriller film Soul Survivors (2001)
- Raven, the main character in the 1997 HBO animated series Spicy City
- Raven, in T.H.U.N.D.E.R. Agents
- Raven, in Zoids: Chaotic Century/Zoids: Guardian Force

=== Literature ===
- "The Raven", a narrative poem by American writer Edgar Allan Poe
- Raven, a novelization of the 1977 TV series by Trevor Ray and Jeremy Burnham
- Raven, a 1979–79 series of novels by Robert Holdstock and Angus Wells, writing as Richard Kirk
- Raven (Reiterman book), a 1982 book about Jim Jones and the People's Temple by Tim Reiterman
- Raven, a 1989 novel by Stanley Morgan
- Raven, a 1993 novel by Charles L. Grant
- Raven (picture book), a 1993 children's picture book told and illustrated by Gerald McDermott
- Raven, a 1996 novel by S. Andrew Swann, writing as S. A. Swiniarski
- Raven, a 1998 novel by V. C. Andrews
- Raven, a 2009-11 trilogy of novels by Giles Kristian
- Ravens, a 2009 novel by George Dawes Green
- Raven, a 2013 novella by Lauren Oliver
- Raven, a 2015 novella by Tommy Donbavand
- Teen Titans: Raven, a 2019 graphic novel by Kami Garcia
- Raven, a 2021 novel by Laurel O'Donnell
- Raven (novel), a 2025 thriller novel by Robert T. Kelley

=== Music ===
- Raven (band), a heavy metal band
- Raven (Paula Cole album), 2013
- Raven (Kelela album), 2023
- Raven (Isabel LaRosa album), 2025
- "Raven", a song by Battle Beast from Battle Beast
- "Raven", a song by the Dave Matthews Band from Busted Stuff
- "Raven", a song by Eternal Tears of Sorrow from Vilda Mánnu
- "Raven", a song by Grave Digger from The Grave Digger

=== Television ===
- Raven (1977 TV series), a British television series
- Raven (2002 TV series), a 2002–2010 & 2017–2018 British children's game show
- Raven (American TV series), a 1992–1993 American action drama television series
- Raven (Polish TV series), a 2018 Polish television series

=== Film ===
- Raven (1996 film), starring Burt Reynolds

== Businesses and organizations ==
- Raven Arms, an American firearms manufacturer
- Raven Industries, an American manufacturer of plastic, electronic and "special apparel" products
- Raven Software, an American video game developer
- Respecting Aboriginal Values & Environmental Needs, a charitable organization
- Raven Society, a student society at the University of Virginia

== Military ==
- Raven (air defence), a UK-made surface-to-air missile system using ASRAAM missiles
- Raven Forward Air Controllers, fighter pilots used in covert operations during the Vietnam War
- Raven-class minesweeper, a World War II US Navy class of minesweepers
- AeroVironment RQ-11 Raven, a UAV used by the U.S. military
- Curtiss O-40 Raven, an unsuccessful American observation aircraft of the 1930s
- General Dynamics–Grumman EF-111A Raven, an electronic warfare aircraft retired in 1998
- Hiller OH-23 Raven, a helicopter used by the U.S. Army
- HMS Raven, the name of fourteen ships and a shore establishment of the British Royal Navy
- USS Raven, the name of several US Navy ships

== People ==
- Raven (given name), a unisex given name
- Raven (surname)
- Raven (drag queen) (born 1979), American drag queen and reality television personality
- Raven (wrestler) (born 1964), American professional wrestler, producer, writer and actor
- Raven Lake, Canadian professional wrestler, mother of Bambi Hall
- A female member of the TV show American Gladiators
- Raven-Symoné, also known as Raven, an American actress known for starring in That's So Raven

== Places ==
=== Canada ===
- Raven, Alberta, an unincorporated community
- Raven Lake, a lake that straddles the border between Quebec and Ontario

=== United States ===
- Raven, Kentucky, an unincorporated community
- Raven, Nebraska, an unincorporated community
- Raven, Virginia, a census-designated place
- Raven Creek, Pennsylvania
- Raven Ridge, Colorado and Utah

=== Elsewhere ===
- Raven, Bulgaria, a village
- Raven, Gostivar, Republic of Macedonia
- Raven Crag, a fell in the English Lake District
- Raven Glacier, Greenland
- Sveti Peter, Piran, a village in southwestern Slovenia, formerly named Raven
- The Raven Nature Reserve, County Wexford, Ireland

== Transportation ==
- Raven (sailboat), an American sailboat design
- Raven Rotorcraft, an American aircraft manufacturer
- Rans S-20 Raven, an American light-sport aircraft design
- SS Raven (1871), a steam barge built for service on Windermere in the English Lake District for the Furness Railway
- MY Raven, an excursion vessel built in 1889 as the SY Raven
- Winds Italia Raven, an Italian powered hang glider design
- A class of South Devon Railway 0-4-0 locomotives

== Other uses ==
- Raven, a gunshot detector manufactured by Flock Safety
- Raven, a sound-analysis software program produced by the Cornell Lab of Ornithology
- Raven Hotel, a public house in Greater Manchester, England
- Raven Tales, descriptions of creation stories that involve the mythic figure Raven
- Raven's Progressive Matrices, a nonverbal psychometric test used to measure fluid intelligence

== See also ==
- The Raven (disambiguation)
- Ravens (disambiguation)
- Rave (disambiguation)
- Raver (disambiguation)
