= Raven (surname) =

Raven is a surname, and may refer to:

- Andrew Raven (1959–2005), Scottish conservationist, son of John
- Arlene Raven (1944–2006), art historian, author and feminist
- Bertram Raven (1926–2020), American academic
- Charles Raven (disambiguation)
- Charlotte Raven (1969–2025), British author and journalist
- Clara Raven (1905–1994), American physician
- Cliff Raven, pioneering American tattoo artist
- David Raven (disambiguation)
- Eddy Raven (born 1944), American singer and songwriter
- Elsa Raven (1929–2020), American actress
- Ernst Raven (1804–1881), immigrant from Germany who became a prominent resident of Texas
- Jens Raven, Indonesian footballer
- John Raven (1914–1980), English classical scholar and amateur botanist, father of Andrew and Sarah
- John Albert Raven (1941–2024), British botanist and academic
- John C. Raven (1902–1970), English psychologist
- John Raven (cricketer) (1851–1940), English cricketer
- Jon Raven (1940–2015), English author and musician
- Josh Ravin (born 1988), American baseball player
- Julius A. Raven (1918–1942), United States navy officer, pilot, and Distinguished Flying Cross and Air Medal recipient
- Leonard Raven-Hill, English artist and illustrator
- Marion Raven (born 1984), Norwegian singer-songwriter and former child actress
- Michael Raven (born 1964), American pornographic film director
- Michael Raven (author) (1938–2008), English author, musician, composer and poet
- Austin Churton Fairman (1924–1997), widely known under the pseudonym Mike Raven, British radio disc jockey and sculptor
- Paul Raven (disambiguation)
- Peter H. Raven (1936–2026), American botanist and environmentalist
- Robert J. Raven, Australian arachnologist
- Sarah Raven (born 1963), gardener, cook and writer, daughter of John
- Simon Raven (1927–2001), English author, playwright, essayist, television writer, and screenwriter
- Vincent Raven (1859–1934), British locomotive engineer

== See also ==
- Raven (disambiguation)
