= The Raven (disambiguation) =

"The Raven" is a narrative poem by Edgar Allan Poe.

The Raven may also refer to:

== Characters ==
- The Raven, a character in Princess Tutu
- The Raven, a character in Empires & Allies

== Film and television ==
- The Raven (1915 film), a silent movie by Charles Brabin
- The Raven (1935 film), a horror film starring Boris Karloff and Bela Lugosi
- The Raven (1963 film), a horror/comedy film starring Vincent Price, Boris Karloff, and Peter Lorre
- The Raven (2006 film), a horror film by Ulli Lommel
- The Raven (2012 film), a film by James McTeigue starring John Cusack
- The Raven (2007 film), a film by David DeCoteau
- "The Raven" (Star Trek: Voyager), a 1997 episode of Star Trek: Voyager
- "The Raven" (The Simpsons), a segment of The Simpsons episode "Treehouse of Horror"
- Highlander: The Raven, a TV series
- Kagagi or Kagagi: The Raven, a TV series on APTN Kids

== Literature ==
- "The Raven" (Brothers Grimm), a fairy tale collected by the Grimm Brothers
- "The Raven" (Italian fairy tale), a literary fairy tale by Giambattista Basile
- "The Raven", a 1798 poem by Samuel Taylor Coleridge
- The Raven: The Love Story of Edgar Allan Poe, a 1904 play and 1909 novel by George Cochrane Hazelton
- The Raven, a 1937 novel by John Creasey, writing as M. E. Cooke
- The Raven, a 1995 novel by Peter Landesman
- The Ravens (Norwegian: Ravnene), a 2011 novel by Vidar Sundstøl
- The Raven, a 2011 novel by Patrick Carman, the fourth volume in the Skeleton Creek series
- The Raven, a 2013 novel by Jeremy Robinson, writing as Jeremy Bishop
- The Raven, a 2016 novel by Mike Nappa
- The Ravens, a 2020 novel by Kass Morgan and Danielle Paige

== Music ==
- The Raven (Lou Reed album), or its title song
- The Raven (The Stranglers album), or its title song
- "The Raven" (song), a 1976 song by the Alan Parsons Project from Tales of Mystery and Imagination
- The Raven (Sibelius), an abandoned orchestral song
- "The Ravens", a song by Bathory from Blood on Ice
- The Raven, a 1971 composition for narrator and orchestra by Leonard Slatkin

== Other uses ==
- The Raven: Anarchist Quarterly, an anarchist review produced by Freedom Press
- The Raven, the Cherokee chief also known as Savanukah
- The Raven (paintings) a series of paintings by Nabil Kanso
- The Raven (roller coaster), a roller coaster at Holiday World
- The Raven (Harold Kionka), pioneer of Internet TV and web television
- The Raven: Legacy of a Master Thief, a point-and-click video game by King Art Games
- The Raven, a pseudonym of Sam Houston
- The Raven (runner), an American runner

== See also ==
- Le Corbeau (The Raven), a 1943 French noir film starring Pierre Fresnay and Ginette Leclerc
- Raven (disambiguation)
- Black Raven (disambiguation)
