= Ernest II of Saxe-Coburg and Gotha =

Duke of Saxe-Coburg and Gotha from 1844 to 1893

Ernest II
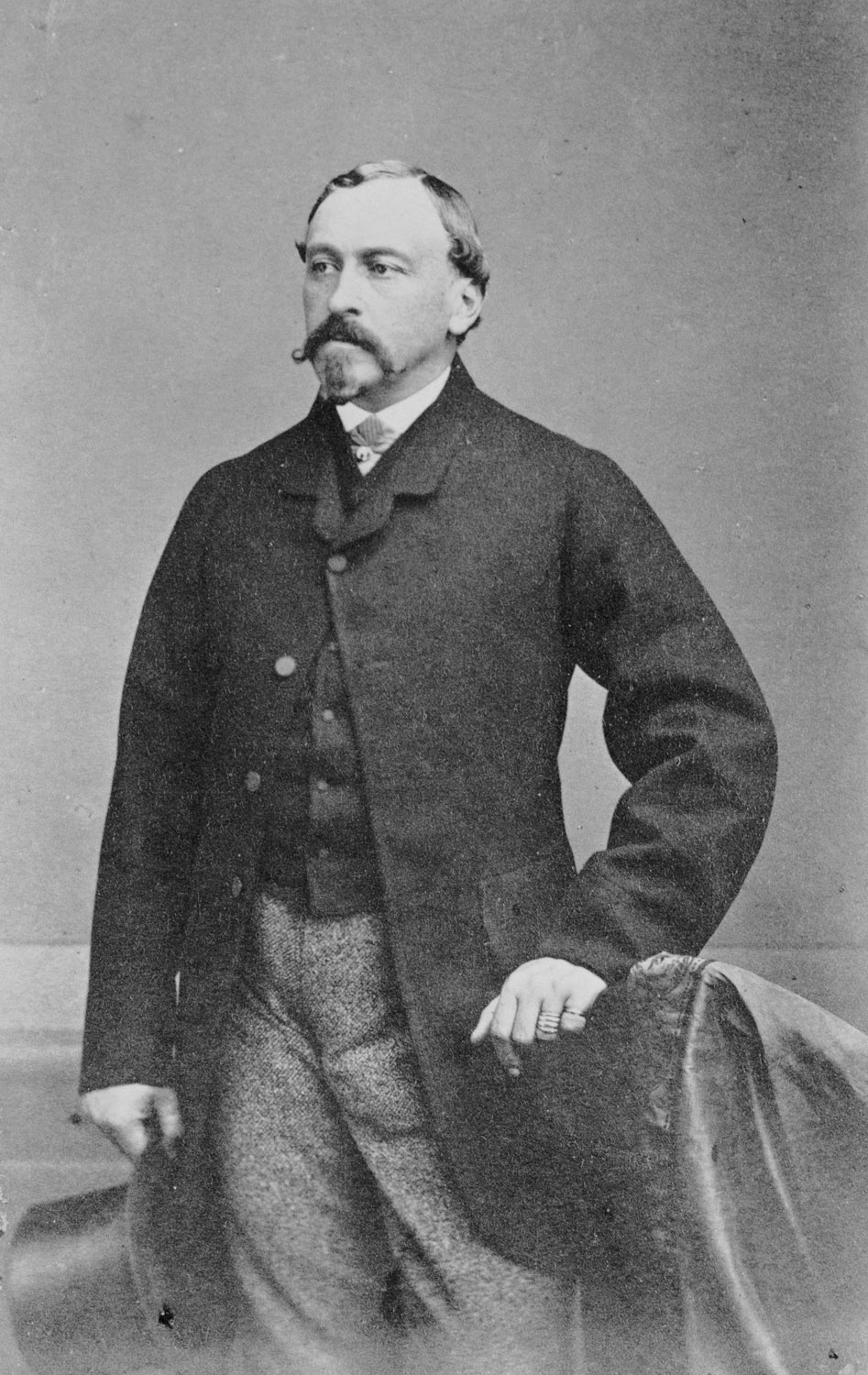
- Ernest II, c. 1863

Duke of Saxe-Coburg and Gotha
- Reign: 29 January 1844 – 22 August 1893
- Predecessor: Ernest I
- Successor: Alfred
- Born: 21 June 1818; Ehrenburg Palace, Coburg, Saxe-Coburg-Saalfeld, German Confederation
- Died: 22 August 1893 (aged 75); Reinhardsbrunn Castle, Saxe-Coburg-Gotha, German Empire
- Burial: Friedhof am Glockenberg, Coburg
- Spouse: Princess Alexandrine of Baden (m. 1842)
- Issue: Marie Helene von Sternheim (1839–1900) (illegitimate daughter)
Names
- German: Ernst August Karl Johann Leopold Alexander Eduard; English: Ernest Augustus Charles John Leopold Alexander Edward
- House: Saxe-Coburg-Saalfeld (until 1826); Saxe-Coburg and Gotha (from 1826)
- Father: Ernest I, Duke of Saxe-Coburg and Gotha
- Mother: Princess Louise of Saxe-Gotha-Altenburg

Ernest II (German: Ernst August Karl Johann Leopold Alexander Eduard; 21 June 1818 – 22 August 1893) was Duke of Saxe-Coburg and Gotha from 29 January 1844 to his death in 1893. He was born in Coburg to Ernest I, Duke of Saxe-Coburg-Saalfeld, and Princess Louise of Saxe-Gotha-Altenburg. His father became Duke of Saxe-Coburg and Gotha (as Ernest I) in 1826 through an exchange of territories.

In 1842, Ernest married Princess Alexandrine of Baden in what was to be a childless marriage. Two years later, he became Duke of Saxe-Coburg and Gotha when his father died. Ernest supported the German Confederation in the Schleswig-Holstein Wars against Denmark, sending thousands of troops and becoming the commander of a German corps; he was instrumental in the 1849 victory at the battle of Eckernförde against Danish forces. After King Otto of Greece was deposed in 1862, the British government put Ernest's name forward as a possible successor. Negotiations concerning this failed for various reasons—not least of which was that he would not give up his beloved duchies in favor of the Greek throne.

A supporter of a unified Germany, Ernest watched the various political movements with great interest. While he initially was a great and outspoken proponent of German liberalism, he surprised many by switching sides and supporting the more conservative (and eventually victorious) Prussians during the Austro-Prussian and Franco-Prussian Wars and subsequent unification of Germany. His support of the conservatives came at a price however, and he was no longer viewed as the possible leader of a political movement. According to historian Charlotte Zeepvat, Ernest became "increasingly lost in a whirl of private amusements which earned only contempt from outside".

Ernest and his only full sibling, his younger brother Prince Albert (consort to Queen Victoria of the United Kingdom), were born 14 months apart and raised as though twins. They became closer upon the separation and divorce of their parents as well as the eventual death of their mother. Their relationship experienced phases of closeness as well as minor arguments as they grew older. After Albert's death in 1861, Ernest published anonymous pamphlets against various members of the British royal family. However, he accepted Albert's second son, Prince Alfred, Duke of Edinburgh, as his heir-presumptive. Upon Ernest's death at Reinhardsbrunn, Alfred succeeded to the ducal throne.

== Early life ==
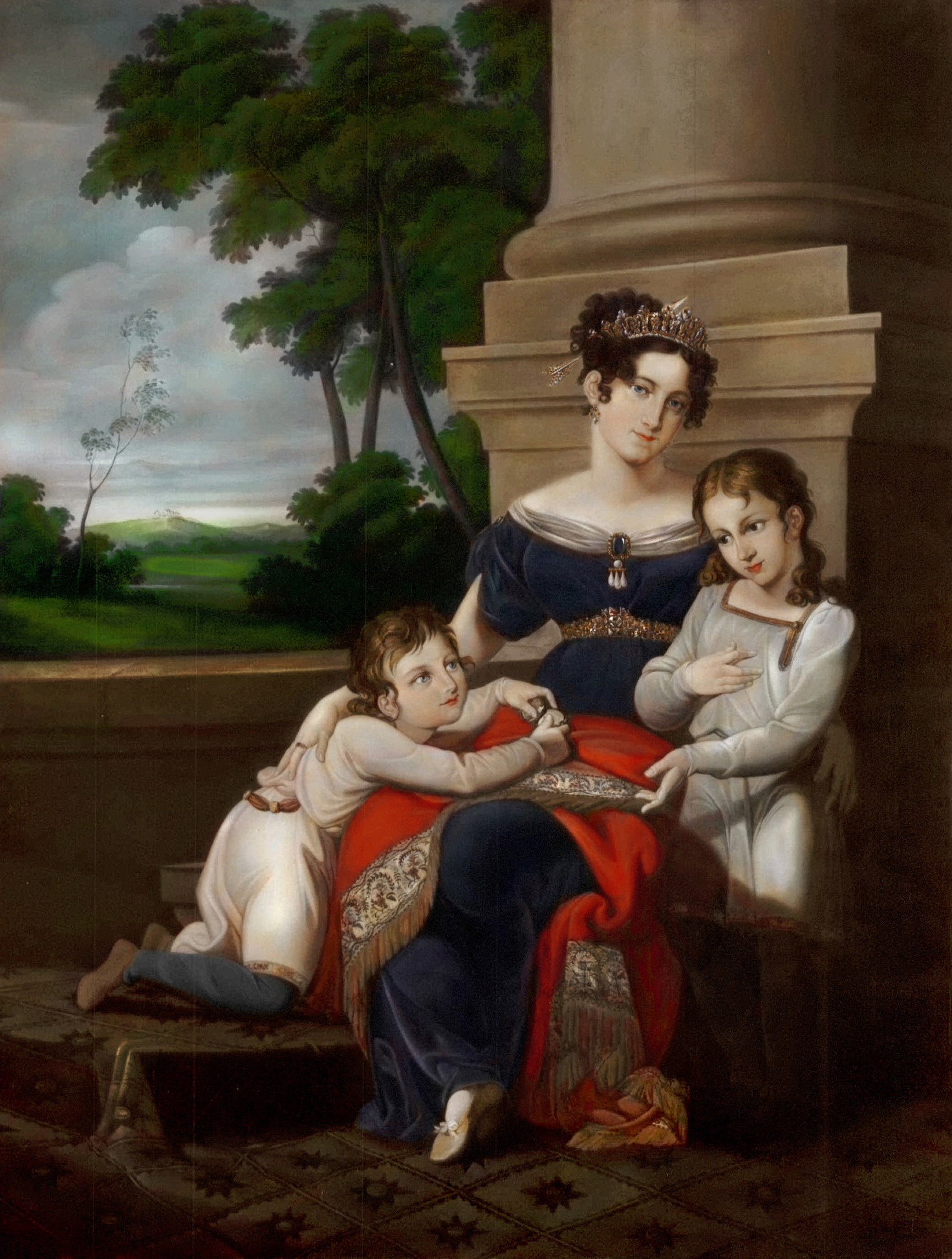
Ernest (right) with his younger brother Albert and mother Louise, shortly before her exile from court

Ernest was born at Ehrenburg Palace in Coburg on 21 June 1818. He was the elder son of Ernest III, Duke of Saxe-Coburg-Saalfeld (later Ernest I, Duke of Saxe-Coburg and Gotha) and his first wife Princess Louise of Saxe-Gotha-Altenburg. He was soon joined by a brother, Prince Albert, who would later become the husband of Queen Victoria. Though Duke Ernest fathered numerous children in various affairs, the two boys would have no other legitimate siblings. In 1826, their father succeeded as Ernest I, Duke of Saxe-Coburg and Gotha through an exchange of territories after the death of the duke's uncle, Frederick IV, Duke of Saxe-Gotha-Altenburg.

There are various accounts of Ernest's childhood. When he was fourteen months old, a servant commented that Ernest "runs around like a weasel. He is teething and as cross as a little badger from impatience and liveliness. He is not pretty now, except his beautiful black eyes." In May 1820, his mother described Ernest as "very big for his age, as well as intelligent. His big black eyes are full of spirit and vivacity." Biographer Richard Hough writes that "even from their infancy, it was plainly evident that the elder son took after his father, in character and appearance, while Albert strongly resembled his mother in most respects." Ernest and his brother often lived with their grandmother the Dowager Duchess of Saxe-Coburg-Saalfeld until her death in 1831.

He and Albert were brought up and educated together as if they were twins. Though Albert was fourteen months younger, he surpassed Ernest intellectually. According to their tutor, "they went hand-in-hand in all things, whether at work or at play. Engaging in the same pursuits, sharing the same joys and the same sorrows, they were bound to each other by no common feelings of mutual love". Perhaps the aforementioned "sorrows" related to their parents' marriage; it was not happy, and Duke Ernest I was continually unfaithful. In 1824, Ernest I and Louise divorced; she subsequently left Coburg and was disallowed from seeing her sons again. She soon remarried to Alexander von Hanstein, Count of Pölzig and Beiersdorf, dying in 1831 at the age of thirty. The year after her death, their father married his niece Duchess Marie of Württemberg, who was his sister Antoinette's daughter. Their stepmother was thus also their first cousin. The duke and his new duchess were not close, and would produce no children; while the boys formed a happy relationship with their stepmother, Marie had little to no input in her stepsons' lives. The separation and divorce of their parents, as well as the later death of their mother, left the boys scarred and in close companionship with each other.

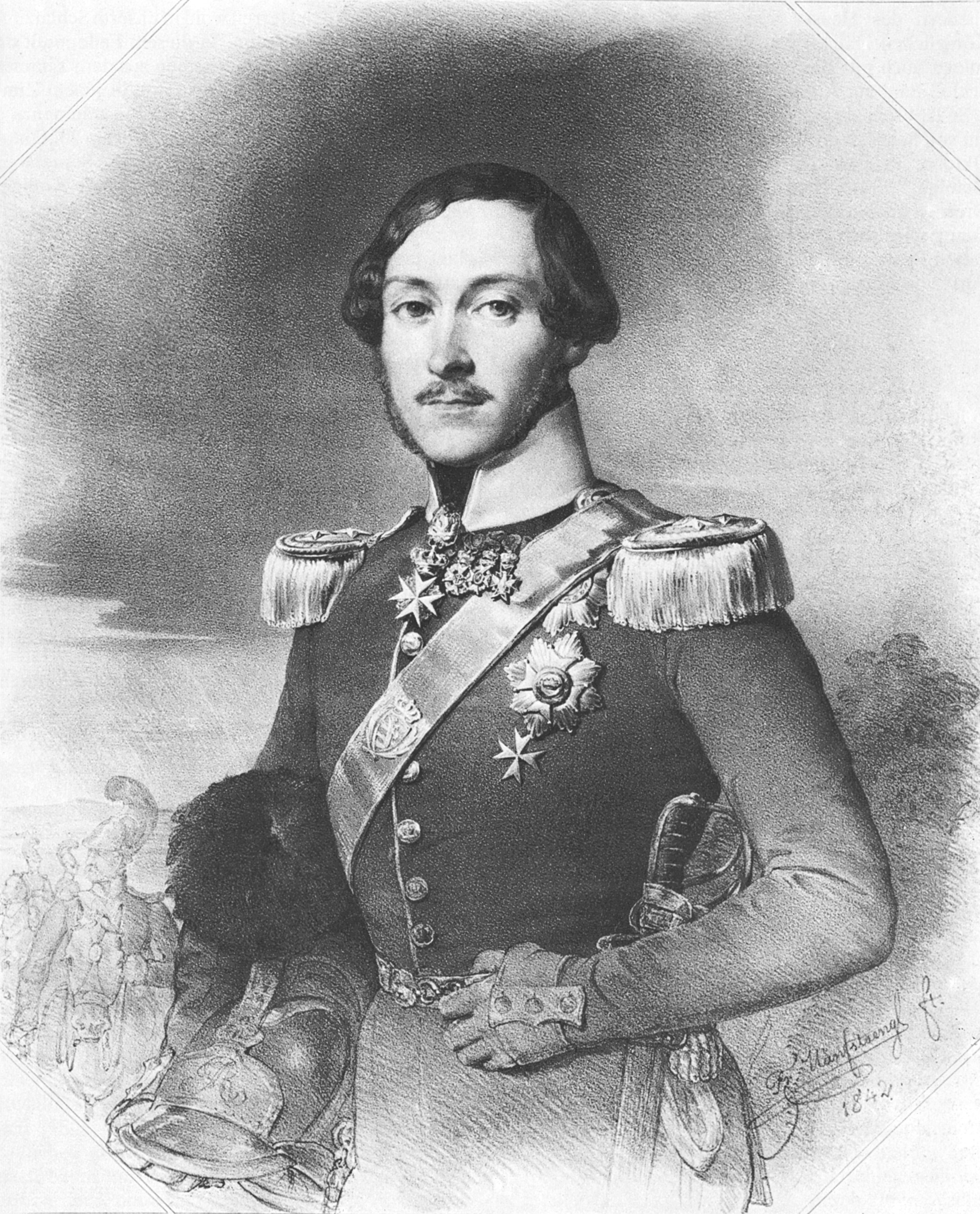
A lithograph of Ernest, 1842

In 1836, Ernest and Albert visited their matrimonially eligible cousin Princess Victoria of Kent, spending a few weeks at Windsor Castle. Both boys, especially Albert, were considered by their family to be a potential husband for the young princess, and they were both taught to speak competent English. Their father at first thought that Ernest would make a better husband to Victoria than Albert, possibly because his sporting interests would be better received by the British public. However, most others favored Albert over Ernest as a possible husband. Temperamentally, Victoria was much more like Ernest, for both were lively and sociable with a love for dancing, gossip, and late nights; conversely, this fast pace made Albert physically ill. Victoria believed Ernest had a "most kind, honest, and intelligent expression in his countenance", while Albert "seemed full of goodness and sweetness, and very clever and intelligent." No offer of marriage was forthcoming for either brother however, and they returned home.

Ernest entered military training later that year. In April 1837, Ernest and Albert and their household moved to the University of Bonn. Six weeks into their academic term, Victoria succeeded as Queen of the United Kingdom. As rumors of an impending marriage between her and Albert interfered with their studies, the two brothers left on 28 August 1837 at the close of the term to travel around Europe. They returned to Bonn in early November to continue their studies. The brothers travelled to England again in 1839, at which time Victoria found her cousin Albert agreeable, and soon proposed. This connection would have many implications for Ernest in the future; for example, he was selected as godfather for Albert's second daughter Princess Alice, and would eventually come to give her away at her wedding, only months after Albert's death.

Thanks to his widespread royal connections, he travelled widely at this stage of his life. In 1840 and 1841 he went to Spain and Portugal; in Portugal another cousin, Ferdinand, was King Consort.

== Marriage ==
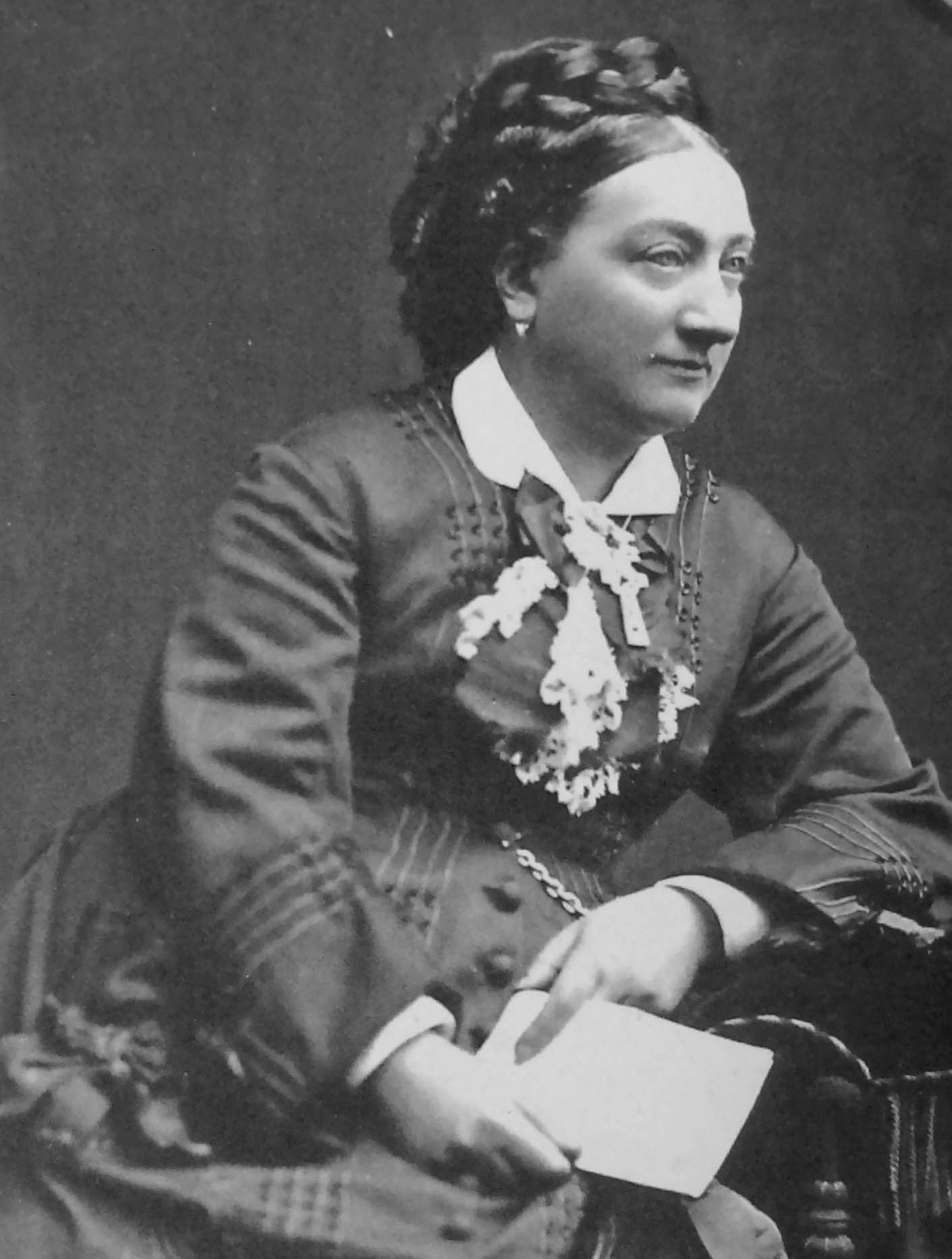
Ernest's wife Princess Alexandrine of Baden. She would remain fiercely devoted to Ernest during their marriage, believing that their childlessness was her fault.

Various candidates were put forward as a possible wife for Ernest. His father wanted him to look to a woman of high rank, such as a Russian grand duchess, for a wife. One possibility was Princess Clémentine of Orléans, a daughter of Louis Philippe I, whom he met while visiting the court at the Tuileries. However, such a marriage would have required his conversion from Lutheranism to Roman Catholicism, and consequently nothing came of it. She later married his cousin Prince August of Saxe-Coburg and Gotha. Ernest was also considered by Dowager Queen Maria Christina as a possible husband for her young daughter Isabella II of Spain, and by Queen Victoria for her cousin Princess Augusta of Cambridge.

In Karlsruhe on 3 May 1842, Ernest married 21-year-old Princess Alexandrine of Baden. She was the eldest daughter of Leopold, Grand Duke of Baden, and Princess Sophie of Sweden, daughter of the deposed King Gustav IV Adolf of Sweden. Though he gave his consent, his father was disappointed that his first son did not do more to advance the concerns of Coburg. The marriage did not produce any issue, though Ernest apparently fathered at least three illegitimate children in later years.

One illegitimate daughter was Marie Helene von Sternheim (23 November 1839 – 31 December 1900), fathered when he was twenty-one years old, who firstly married Johann Wolfgang Eduard von Reuter (19 February 1826 – 6 August 1870). After his death in the Franco-German War, she married Augustus Erhard Kurt von der Trenck (29 April 1832 – 10 December 1882), aide-de-camp of Ernest's nephew and successor, Alfred. Through Helene, Ernest had two grandsons: Alexander von Reuter (22 June 1866 – 21 February 1935) and Ludwig von Reuter (9 February 1869 – 18 December 1943). Helene was described by Ernest's great-niece, Princess Victoria of Hesse and by Rhine, in her memoirs:

One illegitimate daughter of Uncle Ernest he more or less recognized. She was about Aunt Vicky's age and a friend of Aunt Vicky and Mama's, a handsome, dark-eyed woman like her father and very amusing. Her first husband, von Reuter, was killed in the Franco-German war and I remember a long visit she paid to my parents in her widowhood when she and her three little boys lived with us at Seeheim.The youngest of these boys was to be the German admiral von Rentes during the Great War.

Ernest had suffered from a venereal disease in his late teens and early twenties, most likely as the consequence of living a wild, promiscuous lifestyle. He had come to behave in such a fashion by the tutelage of his father, who took his sons to "sample the pleasures" of Paris and Berlin, to Albert's "horror and shame". Ernest had been so visibly deteriorating in appearance as a result that Sarah Lyttelton, a lady-in-waiting of Queen Victoria, observed at Windsor Castle in 1839 that he was "very thin and hollow-cheeked and pale, and no likeness to his brother, nor much beauty. But he has fine dark eyes and black hair, and light figure, and a great look of spirit and eagerness". Later that year, Albert counselled his brother against finding a wife until his 'condition' was fully recovered. He further warned that continued promiscuity could leave Ernest incapable of fathering children. Some historians believe that while he himself was able to father other children, the disease rendered his young wife infertile. Ernest was married for 51 years and with his wife visited Queen Victoria in Paris in 1890.

== Duke of Saxe-Coburg and Gotha ==
On 29 January 1844, Ernest's father died in Gotha, one of the territories their family had recently acquired. Ernest consequently succeeded to the duchies of Saxe-Coburg and Gotha as Ernest II.

=== Development of a constitution ===
Extravagant to a great degree, Ernest had many money troubles throughout his reign. In January 1848, Ernest visited his brother in the midst of political unrest in Germany. Upon his return, he also discovered unrest in Coburg. One of the many concerns related to finances. Although Ernest had a large inheritance, he also had frequent debts. There were increasing calls to nationalize most of his property. Indeed, Albert had to intervene at one point and spare his brother the embarrassment of losing one of his Coburg properties.

During the 1848 turmoil in Germany, Albert had been constructing his own liberal reform plan, under which a single monarch, chancellor, and parliament would unite the German states; in addition, each state would retain its own current ruling dynasty. As this plan pertained to his brother, Ernest was given a copy in the hope that he would develop his own liberal constitution. Ernest subsequently made a few concessions, but his position remained sound, not counting the increasing problem of his debts. A constitution was drafted and promulgated in 1849 in Gotha, though one had existed in Coburg since 1821. In 1852, both constitutions were converged into one, which converted the personal union of the two duchies into a real union; the duchies were now inseparable, with a common set of institutions. During the political turmoil, timely concessions and Ernest's popular habit of mingling with "the people in their pleasures" were instrumental in keeping him from losing his throne. Furthermore, various contemporary sources state that Ernest was an able, just and very popular ruler, which may have also helped keep him in power.

=== Schleswig-Holstein wars ===
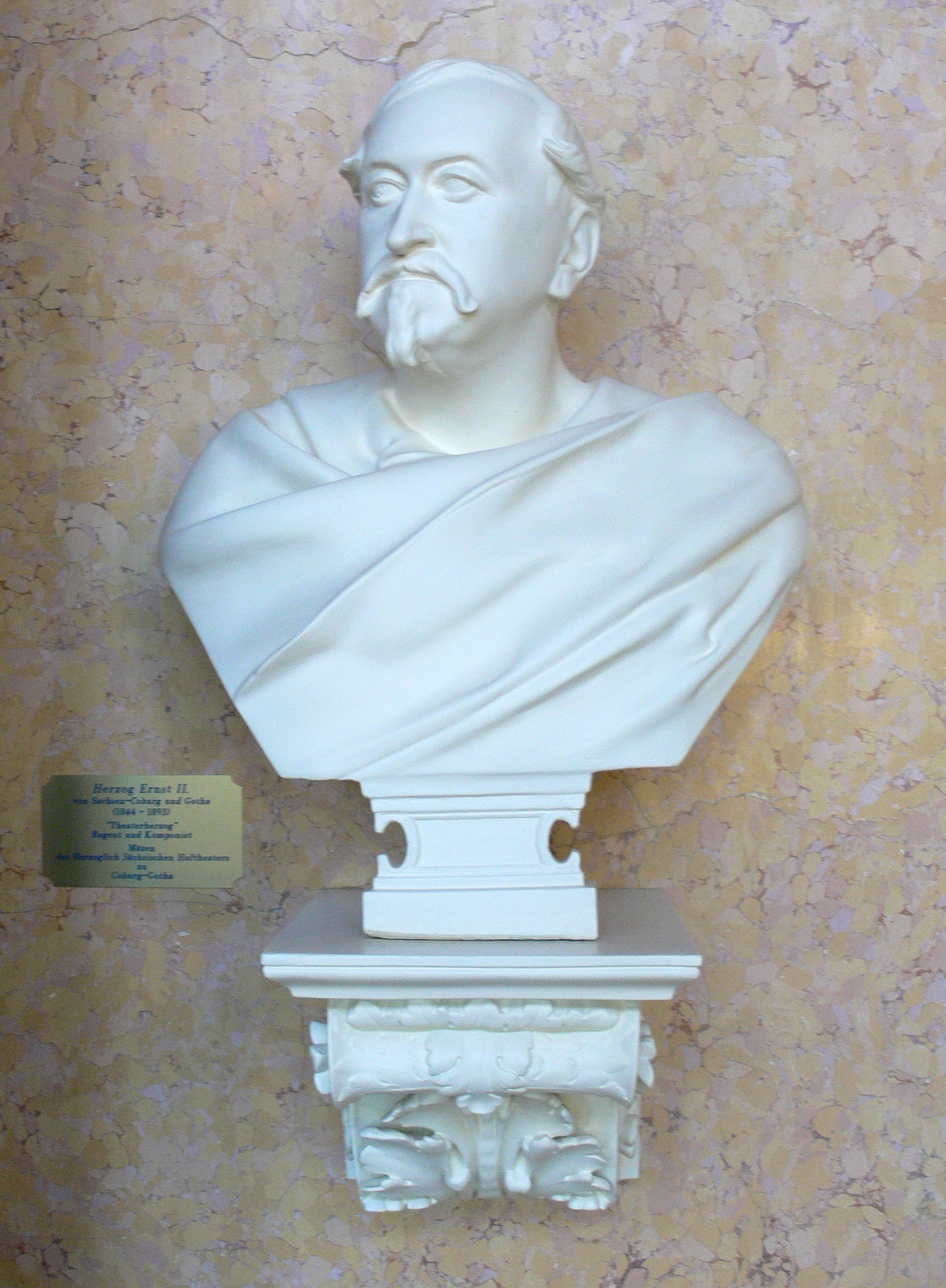
A bust of Ernest at the Landestheater in Coburg. Ernest was a strong enthusiast for music and plays all his life, and was the artistic force behind many that were popular in Germany.

From 1848 to 1864, Denmark and the German Confederation fought over control of the two duchies of Schleswig and Holstein. Historically, the duchies had been ruled by Denmark since medieval times, but there remained a large German majority. This majority was sparked to rebellion after Frederick VII of Denmark announced on 27 March 1848 the duchies would become an integral part of Denmark under his new liberal constitution. Prussia soon became involved, supporting the uprising and beginning the First Schleswig War. Ernest sent 8,000 men initially, adding to the army sent by the German Confederation. He also desired to be given a military job during the war, but was refused, as it was "extremely difficult to offer me a position in the army of Schleswig-Holstein corresponding to my rank", according to his memoirs. He agreed to a smaller command, coming to lead a Thuringian contingent; he commented in a letter to his brother that "I should have declined any other command of the kind, but I could not refuse this one, as, in the present condition of our States, it is important to keep the executive power in our hands". As commander of a German corps, Ernest was instrumental in winning the 5 April 1849 battle of Eckernförde against Danish forces, capturing two frigates. Also at this time, Ernest took an interest in the Frankfurt Parliament and may have hoped to be chosen German Emperor, but instead he urged King Frederick of Prussia to take that position, albeit unsuccessfully. Ernest also brought about a Berlin conference of German princes in 1850; he highly valued such opportunities for the political influence they brought him.

=== Relationship with Victoria and Albert ===
The first war ended in 1851, but would resume in 1864. During this interlude, Ernest fervently opposed the marriage of his nephew Albert Edward, Prince of Wales ('Bertie'), to Princess Alexandra of Denmark, a daughter of the future Christian IX of Denmark (and therefore an enemy of the German states). He believed that such a match flew in the face of German interests. Albert replied angrily: "What has that got to do with you?... Vicky has racked her brains to help us to find someone, but in vain...We have no [other reasonable] choice". Albert agreed there were going to be problems with the match, but as he could find no alternative bride, he wrote to Ernest that keeping the affair a private matter (and outside the realm of government) was "the only way to prevent a break with Prussia and the only way to keep the game in our own hands, impose the conditions that we think necessary, and as far as we can, take off its political edge". Albert also warned his son of Ernest's endeavors to interfere with the match, commenting, "Your uncle...will try his hand at this work. Your best defence will be not to enter on the subject, should he broach it".

Soon after writing these letters, Prince Albert died on 14 December 1861. His death helped Ernest repair his relationship with his sister-in-law, as Victoria had been becoming increasingly angry over Ernest's objections to the Danish match. The two brothers had always been close, whatever their disagreements, and Albert's death left Ernest "wretched", noted Victoria in a letter to her eldest daughter. The death did not solve their argument however; seeing that his direct involvement had failed to persuade Victoria, Ernest tried a new tactic. He began to spread gossip about Alexandra and her family, saying that her mother Princess Louise "had illegitimate children and Alexandra had flirtations with young officers"; he also wrote to Louise herself, warning that Bertie would be an unfortunate choice for a husband. Additionally, Ernest met with his nephew at Thebes, most likely attempting to discourage him from the match in person. In an 11 April letter, Victoria unhappily noted to her eldest daughter, "You did not tell me that Bertie had met Uncle Ernest at Thebes...I am always alarmed when I think of Uncle Ernest and Bertie being together as I know the former will do all he can to set Bertie against the marriage with Princess Alix". Despite Ernest's disapproval, Bertie was duly married to Alexandra on 10 March 1863.

His close relationship with the English court gave him a position of great influence, and the marriage of his niece, Princess Victoria, to Prince Frederick William further strengthened his ties to Prussia, and in 1862 he offered to make his troops available to the King of Prussia in case of war. But his liberalism caused increased suspicion in Germany of the Coburg influence. Prussian conservatives would soon turn against him, and in particular he was opposed by Prussian Minister President Otto von Bismarck.

During the American Civil War, the Duke assigned Ernst Raven to the position of consul in the state of Texas. On 30 July 1861, Raven applied to the Confederate Government for a diplomatic exequatur and was accepted.

=== Nomination for the Greek throne ===
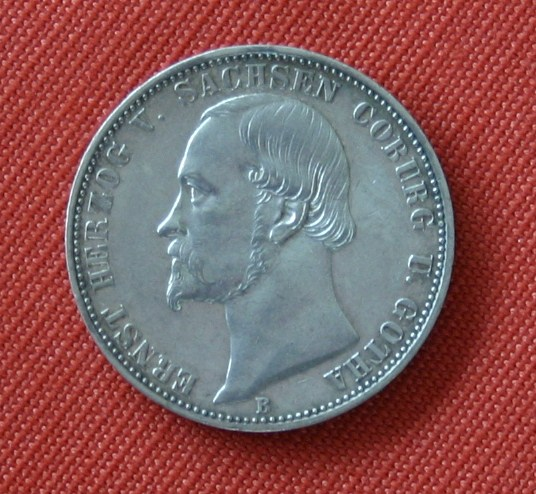
A coin depicting Ernest II, 1869. It was issued to commemorate the twenty-fifth year of his reign.

On 23 October 1862, Otto of Bavaria, King of Greece, was deposed in a bloodless coup. The Greeks were eager to have someone close to Britain and Queen Victoria replace Otto; some desired to allow Prince Alfred, Duke of Edinburgh (her second son) to succeed as King of Greece. He was elected with 95% of the vote in the Greek head of state referendum of 1862. After his ineligibility was confirmed however, the Greeks began looking for other possible candidates, which included Duke Ernest at the British government's suggestion. To their and Victoria's reasoning, if Ernest were to take the Greek throne, Alfred could immediately take up his inheritance and succeed Ernest as duke (the Prince of Wales having passed his claim to the duchy of Saxe-Coburg and Gotha on to his younger brother). Many were in favor of his nomination, including Prime Minister Lord Palmerston as well as Ernest's sister-in-law. In a letter written to her uncle Leopold I of Belgium, Victoria stated her support for a new royal branch of the House of Saxe-Coburg and Gotha (as Leopold had been chosen as King of the Belgians in 1831), as well as her desire for her second son, Alfred, to succeed his uncle in the duchy. As negotiations continued however, she began to lose enthusiasm for the idea.

There were problems to the nomination; Ernest had no legitimate children, and thus would have had to adopt one of the princes of his house to succeed him as King of Greece. To solve this problem, Ernest suggested to Palmerston that he simply take the title Regent of Greece and hold the kingdom in trust for his chosen heir. He also stipulated that if he accepted the throne, it should be subject to certain guarantees by the other powers. The apparent deal-breaker, though, was that Ernest wanted to acquire the Greek throne and still maintain control of his "safer" duchies. In the end, the British cabinet thought the proposed conditions unacceptable. His recommendations having been turned down, Ernest in turn refused. In 1863, the Greek throne was accepted by another member of a royal family: the Princess of Wales' younger brother Prince William of Denmark. Ernest would later comment, "That this cup was spared me, I always regarded as a piece of good fortune".

=== Austro-Prussian and Franco-Prussian Wars ===
Ernest, like his brother, was in favor of a unified but federal German state. In seeking to realize this goal, Ernest liked to dabble in whatever political system promised the most success. He subsequently watched the growth of liberalism in Germany with much interest and tried to build links with the movement's leaders. During Albert's lifetime, Ernest took a close interest in the movement for reform, and was perceived as a progressive within Germany. His favorable view of liberalism caused his duchy to become an asylum for political refugees from other German states. In 1863, he attended the liberal Frankfurt Conference, which was openly avoided by more conservative Prussia. Though his attendance made him no friends in Prussia, he developed such strong contacts in Austria that many looked to him as a potential leader in the mounting conflict between the northern and southern powers. He grew tired of the advice he received from Albert on the subject however; as Ernest "was by no means inclined to consent to an energetic rule such as I adopted immediately afterwards for the perfection of the constitutional system", according to Albert's letters.

The Austro-Prussian War of 1866 was triggered by the desire of German conservative leaders to unify, albeit on different terms than their liberal counterparts. Ernest urged Prussian leaders against the impending war, and was an active advocate of the Austrian cause. Though Ernest normally followed more liberal politics than many of his counterparts, he began switching his views to align more closely with Bismarck by the mid-1860s. Despite this change in his private political views, he still had strong publicly known ties to Austria, where his cousin Alexander, Count Mensdorff, was Foreign Minister, and no one foresaw that Ernest would immediately side with the better-equipped Prussians upon breakout of the war. His reasoning is usually understood as acting in the best interests of his duchies, and by extension, of himself. Some influence came from Bismarck, who explained his policy and tactics in a letter to Ernest. Regardless, it was seen as a betrayal of former friends; Queen Victoria commented that Ernest "might have agreed to neutrality—for that might be necessary, but to change colours I cannot think right".

Ernest was fortunate in his support of victorious Prussia; for his services he received the forest of Schmalkalden. Many other petty German dukes, princes, and kings who had supported Austria suffered immensely at Hohenzollern hands. Hanover, Hesse-Kassel, and Nassau for instance were all annexed to Prussia at the expense of their respective rulers. Though he had only recently changed his political views, Ernest was allowed to ride at the head of his battalion during the victory parade. His eldest niece Prussian Crown Princess Victoria ("Vicky") was for one pleased with his Prussian support and commented "I am not accustomed to hearing so much praise of Coburg here. [Ernest] was not among the crushed and beaten foe, it is sad enough as it is to see so many of one's friends suffering from the effects of their miscalculations". Victoria's husband Crown Prince Frederick William was also pleased with Ernest's decision, writing in his journal 28 September 1871, that the duke's "society always affords me peculiar pleasure, especially...when his heart beats so warmly for Germany".

Ernest's support of the Prussians in the Austro-Prussian War and later Franco Prussian War meant he was no longer the potential leader of a political movement; although it was true that he had been able to retain his duchies, it had come at a price. According to historian Charlotte Zeepvat, Ernest "was increasingly lost in a whirl of private amusements which earned only contempt from outside". Ernest funneled his political thoughts into the private sphere, preferring to write covertly sponsored articles in the Coburg press that became increasingly embittered against England. In 1886, Ernest published Co-Regents and Foreign Influence in Germany, a pamphlet that greatly angered his family; though produced anonymously, no one doubted that it was written by Ernest. It attacked Vicky as a disloyal German that was too dependent on her mother, and declared that she had been too indiscreet in passing along confidential information during both war and peacetime. Queen Victoria was furious, writing to Vicky, "What you told me of Uncle E and that pamphlet is simply monstrous. I assure you that I felt great difficulty in writing to him for his birthday, but I wrote it as short and cool as I could consistently with civility". "Dear Uncle Ernest does us all a great deal of harm by his odd ways and uncontrollable tongue with his very lively imagination".

=== Later years and death ===
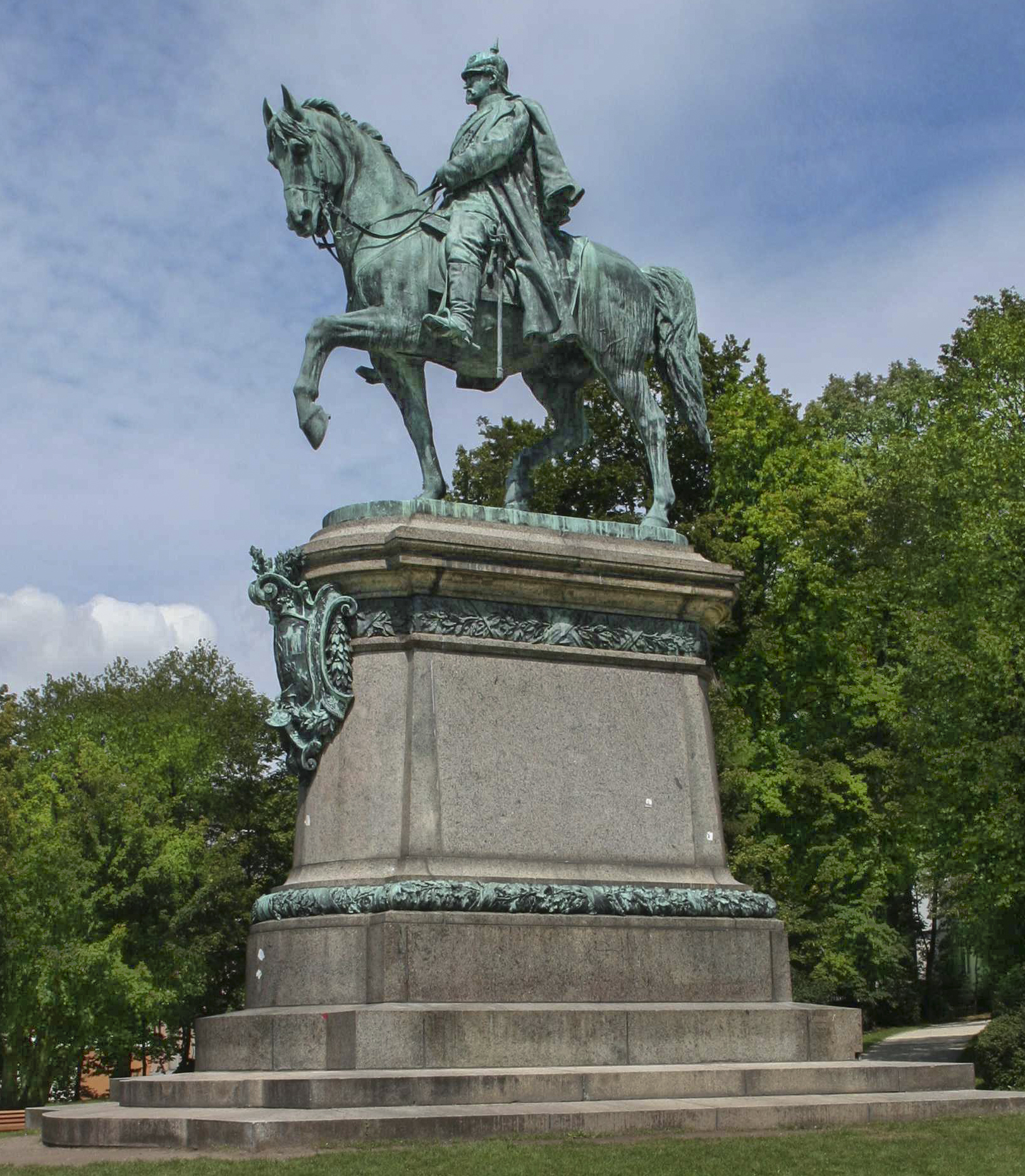
An equestrian statue of Ernest in the Hofgarten, Coburg. In the 1850s, Ernest dramatically transformed the Hofgarten into an English landscape garden. It opened on 27 April 1857 to the public. The statue was constructed in 1899 in order to commemorate Ernest's contributions.

Later in his reign, Ernest's actions managed to continually anger his sister-in-law. Though Victoria loved Ernest because he was Albert's brother, she was displeased that Ernest was writing his memoirs, worrying about their contents mainly in regard to her dead husband. Despite their disputes, Ernest still met with Victoria and her family occasionally. In 1891, they met in France; Victoria's lady-in-waiting commented "the old Duke of Saxe-Coburg-Gotha has been here today with his wife. He is the Prince Consort's only brother and an awful looking man, the Queen dislikes him particularly. He is always writing anonymous pamphlets against the Queen and the Empress Frederick, which naturally creates a great deal of annoyance in the family".

Throughout his reign, Ernest had been known for his extravagance and womanizing; as he grew older, Ernest enjoyed gossip and was "now a thoroughly disreputable old roué who enjoyed the outrage provoked by his actions", leading Vicky to declare that her uncle "was his own enemy". His behavior and manner of dress increasingly became a joke for younger generations. His great-niece Marie of Edinburgh would later describe Ernest as "an old beau, squeezed into a frock-coat too tight for his bulk and uncomfortably pinched in at the waist, sporting a top hat, lemon coloured gloves, and a rosebud in his lapel". He put on weight and though on paper his wealth was large, he was still constantly in debt.

An excellent musician and amateur composer all his life, Ernest was a great patron of the arts and sciences in Coburg, often giving awards and titles to members of the artistic and scientific world, such as Paul Kalisch, a German opera singer and the English chemist William Ernest Bush. Ernest composed songs, hymns, and cantatas, as well as musical pieces for opera and the stage, including Die Gräberinsel (1842), Tony, oder die Vergeltung (1849), Casilda (1851), Santa Chiara (1854), and Zaïre, which met with success in Germany. He could also draw and play the piano. One of his operas, Diana von Solange (1858), prompted Franz Liszt the following year to write an orchestral Festmarsch nach Motiven von E. H. z. S.-C.-G., S.116 (E. H. z. S.-C.-G. was short for Ernst Herzog zu Sachsen-Coburg-Gotha). However, its production at the Metropolitan Opera in New York City in 1890 inspired dismal reviews, with one spectator commenting that its "music was simply rubbish". Ernest was also an avid hunter and sportsman; one contemporary remarked that he was "one of the foremost and keenest sportsman produced by the present century". In addition, Ernest was an enthusiastic patron of everything connected with natural history, for instance traveling to Abyssinia with the German zoologist Alfred Brehm in 1862. That journey was chronicled in a book, Reise des Herzogs Ernst von Sachsen-Koburg-Gotha nach Ägypten, published in 1862. He also published his memoirs in three volumes: Aus meinem Leben und aus meiner Zeit (1888–1890).

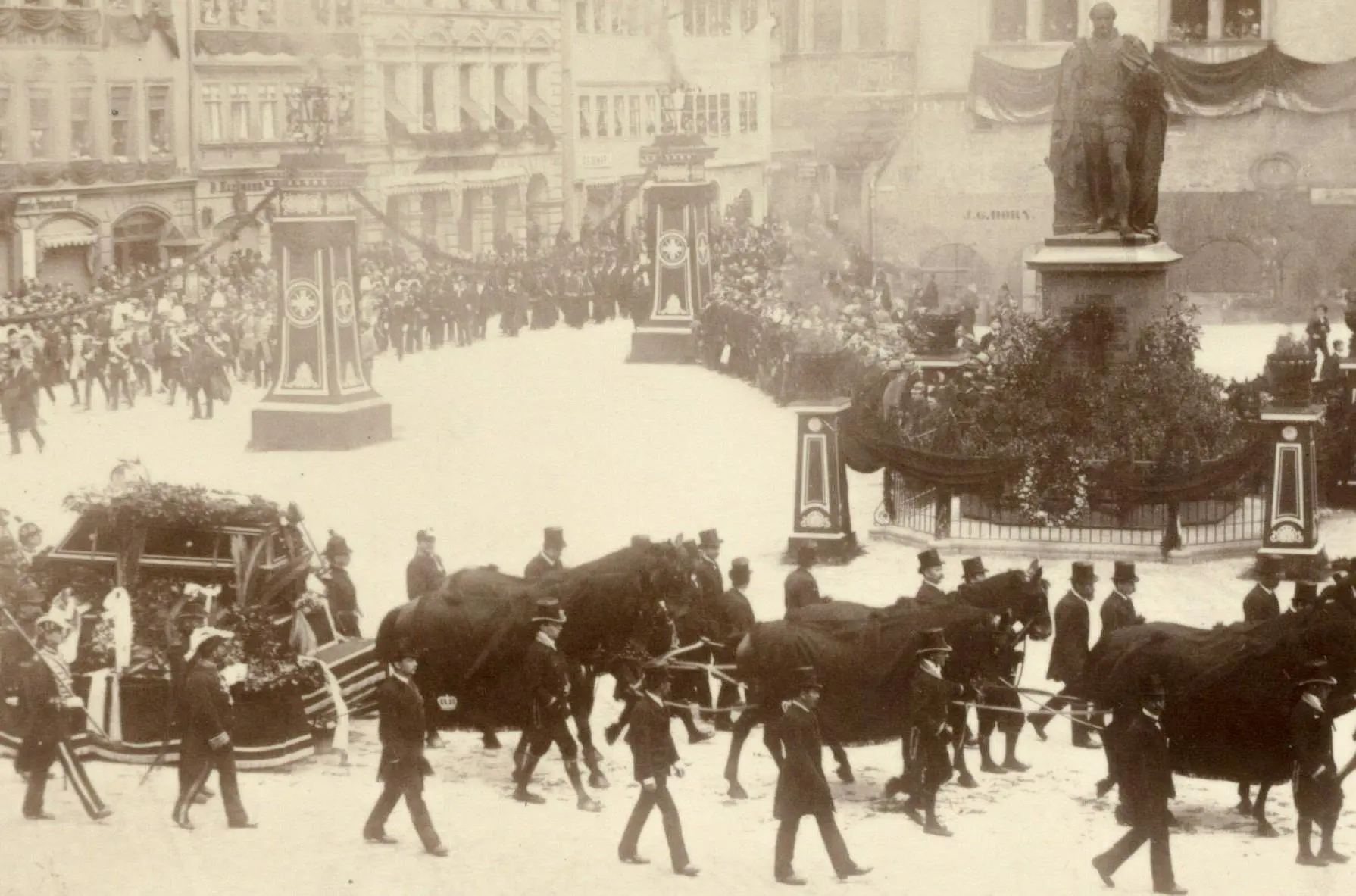
Funeral procession of Duke Ernest II (1893)

Ernest II died at Reinhardsbrunn on 22 August 1893 after a short illness.His funeral was held at the Morizkirche in Coburg; thousands of spectators came to the funeral, including Emperor Wilhelm II and the Prince of Wales. He is buried in the ducal mausoleum in the Friedhof am Glockenberg which he himself had built in 1853–58.

Ernest was succeeded by his nephew Prince Alfred, Duke of Edinburgh.

== Inheritance to Saxe-Coburg and Gotha ==
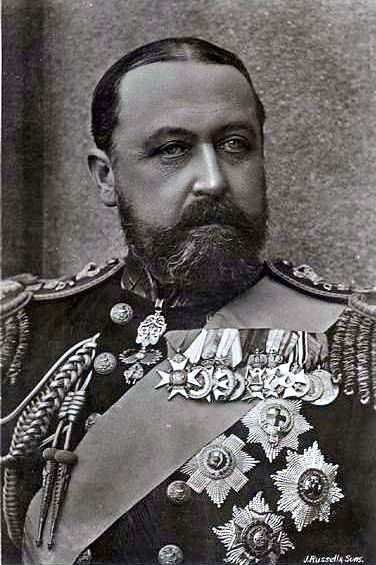
Ernest's heir-presumptive Prince Alfred, Duke of Edinburgh

For much of Ernest's reign, the heir presumptive to Saxe-Coburg and Gotha was his only sibling Prince Albert, consort of Queen Victoria. When it became increasingly clear that Ernest would be childless, the possibility of a personal union between his duchies and the United Kingdom became real, a reality that was deemed undesirable. Special arrangements were made by a combination of constitutional clauses and renunciations to pass Ernest's throne to a son of Albert while preventing a personal union. Consequently, Prince Alfred, Duke of Edinburgh, his brother's second eldest son, was designated the childless Ernest's heir presumptive, when his older brother, the Prince of Wales (later King Edward VII of the United Kingdom), renounced his succession rights.

Issues arose over authority to control the upbringing of his heir-presumptive. As head of the Coburg family, Ernest would normally have been able to arrange Alfred's education and general upbringing unchallenged. This however was not the case. Alfred was torn between his British birth and his German inheritance. This was partly because Alfred was second-in-line to the United Kingdom until the birth of his nephew Prince Albert Victor, Duke of Clarence and Avondale, in 1864. One example of the many problems of his education concerned the language he would speak. Although he grew up learning German, his native language was decided to be English. In addition, a naval career was chosen for Alfred, a common profession for a British prince but almost unheard of for a German prince. Ernest also wanted Alfred to be educated in Coburg, but his brother refused. Albert's refusal most likely stemmed from the negative British reaction that would have inevitably occurred and the fact that Albert was fearful of Alfred's moral development. Thus, despite Ernest's protests, he went unheeded in Albert's lifetime. In 1863, Ernest told Victoria that it was time for Alfred to leave the navy and enter a German university. By March of the following year, it was decided that Alfred would attend Bonn University but be left to consider his future, as he was having reservations over permanently residing outside England. The matter was eventually resolved; Alfred came to accept his inheritance, and Victoria understood and accepted that Ernest needed to be involved in the upbringing of his heir-presumptive, with a strong German element added to his education and (carefully chaperoned) visits to Coburg.

== In popular culture ==
Ernest appears in the 2016 ITV series Victoria, portrayed by David Oakes. He is inaccurately depicted as having an affair with Harriet Sutherland-Leveson-Gower, Duchess of Sutherland. In real life, Ernest likely never met the Duchess; he was already married at the time, and the Duchess was twelve years older than him.

== Honours ==
German honours

- (Saxe-Coburg and Gotha) (Duchy of Saxe-Altenburg) (Saxe-Meiningen) Ernestine duchies:
  - Grand Cross of the Saxe-Ernestine House Order, February 1836; Joint Grand Master, 29 January 1844
  - Knight of St. Joachim
  - Master Mason, 1857
- Baden:
  - Knight of the House Order of Fidelity, 1842
  - Grand Cross of the Zähringer Lion, 1842
- Bavaria: Knight of St. Hubert, 1846
- Brunswick: Grand Cross of Henry the Lion
- Hanover:
  - Knight of St. George, 1858
  - Grand Cross of the Royal Guelphic Order, 1858
- Saxe-Weimar-Eisenach: Grand Cross of the White Falcon, 13 January 1840
- Saxony:
  - Knight of the Rue Crown, 1839
  - Commander of the Military Order of St. Henry, 1st Class, 1849
- Prussia:
  - Knight of the Black Eagle, 23 March 1844; with Collar, 1856
  - Pour le Mérite (military), 11 September 1849
  - Grand Cross of the Red Eagle, 19 September 1865; with Swords, 1866
  - Iron Cross (1870), 2nd Classes
  - Grand Commander's Cross of the Royal House Order of Hohenzollern, with Swords, 17 May 1876
- Württemberg: Grand Cross of the Württemberg Crown, 1886

Foreign decorations

- Kingdom of Portugal:
  - Grand Cross of the Royal Military Order of Our Lord Jesus Christ, 23 April 1836
  - Grand Cross of the Tower and Sword, 1 March 1844
- Belgium: Grand Cordon of the Order of Leopold, 18 November 1839
- Kingdom of France: Grand Cross of the Legion of Honour, May 1843
- United Kingdom: Stranger Knight of the Garter, 12 December 1844
- Austrian Empire: Grand Cross of the Royal Hungarian Order of St. Stephen, 1852
- Empire of Brazil: Grand Cross of the Southern Cross
- Empire of Japan: Grand Cordon of the Order of the Chrysanthemum, 20 April 1883
- Sovereign Military Order of Malta: Bailiff Grand Cross of Honour and Devotion, 16 December 1839
- Kingdom of Serbia: Grand Cross of the Cross of Takovo

== Ancestry ==
Ancestors of Ernest II of Saxe-Coburg and Gotha

8. Ernest Frederick, Duke of Saxe-Coburg-Saalfeld
4. Francis, Duke of Saxe-Coburg-Saalfeld
9. Duchess Sophia Antonia of Brunswick-Wolfenbüttel
2. Ernest I, Duke of Saxe-Coburg and Gotha
10. Henry XXIV, Count Reuss of Ebersdorf
5. Countess Augusta Reuss of Ebersdorf
11. Countess Karoline Ernestine of Erbach-Schönberg
1. Ernest II, Duke of Saxe-Coburg and Gotha
12. Ernest II, Duke of Saxe-Gotha-Altenburg
6. Augustus, Duke of Saxe-Gotha-Altenburg
13. Princess Charlotte of Saxe-Meiningen
3. Princess Louise of Saxe-Gotha-Altenburg
14. Frederick Francis I, Grand Duke of Mecklenburg-Schwerin
7. Duchess Louise Charlotte of Mecklenburg-Schwerin
15. Princess Louise of Saxe-Gotha-Altenburg

== See also ==
- List of knights and ladies of the Garter
- List of members of the House of Wettin
- List of famous big game hunters
- Rosine Stoltz
- Schloss Ketschendorf

== Sources ==
=== Primary ===
- Baillie-Grohman, William Adolph (1896). Sport in the Alps in the Past and Present: An Account of the Chase of the Chamois, Red-deer, Bouquetin, Roe-deer, Capercaillie, and Black-cock, with Personal References and Historical Notes and Some Sporting Reminisces of H.R.H. the Late Duke of Saxe-Coburg-Gotha. London: Scribner.
- Saxe-Coburg and Gotha, Duke Ernest II of (1888). Memoirs of Ernest II: Duke of Saxe-Coburg-Gotha. London: Remington & Co. Publishers., four volumes.

=== Secondary ===
- Alden, Raymond; George Berry; Ernest I. Bogart; et al. (1918). The Encyclopedia Americana: A Library of Universal Knowledge, Volume 10. New York: The Encyclopedia Americana Corporation.
- Allinson, A.R. (2006). The War Diary of the Emperor Frederick III - 1870 - 1871. Home Farm Books. ISBN 1-4067-9995-5.
- Berwanger, Eugene H. (1994). The British Foreign Service and the American Civil War. Lexington, KY: University Press of Kentucky. ISBN 0-8131-1876-X.
- Coit Gilman, Daniel; Harry Thurston Peck; Frank Moore Colby (1903). The New International Encyclopædia, Volume 6. New York: Dodd, Mead, and Company.
- D'Auvergne, Edmund Basil (1911). The Coburgs: The Story of the Rise of a Great Royal House. New York: James Pott & Company. ISBN 1-120-85860-7. "The Coburgs: The Story of the Rise of a Great Royal House."
- Feuchtwanger, E.J. (2006). Albert and Victoria: The Rise and Fall of the House of Saxe-Coburg-Gotha. London: Hambledon Continuum. ISBN 1-85285-461-8.
- Gill, Gillian (2009). We Two: Victoria and Albert: Rulers, Partners, Rivals. New York: Ballantine Books. ISBN 978-0-345-52001-2.
- Grey, Hon. Charles (1868). The Early Years of His Royal Highness The Prince Consort. New York: Harper & Brothers Publishers. "The Early Years of His Royal Highness The Prince Consort."
- Headlam, James Wycliffe (1911). "Ernest II." . In Chisholm, Hugh (ed.). Encyclopædia Britannica. Vol. 9 (11th ed.). Cambridge University Press. pp. 751–752.
- Hibbert, Christopher (2007). Edward VII: The Last Victorian King. New York: Palgrave Macmillan.
- Hough, Richard (1996). Victoria and Albert. New York: St. Martin's Griffin. ISBN 0-312-30385-8. "Victoria and albert."
- Kenning, George (1878). Kenning's Masonic Encyclopedia and Handbook of Masonic Archeology, History and Biography. London: Kessinger Publishing. ISBN 0-7661-6526-4.
- Packard, Jerome M. (1998). Victoria's Daughters. New York: St. Martin's Press. ISBN 0-312-24496-7.
- Pakula, Hannah (1997). An Uncommon Woman: The Empress Frederick, Daughter of Queen Victoria, Wife of the Crown Prince of Prussia, Mother of Kaiser Wilhelm. New York: Simon and Schuster Inc. ISBN 0-684-84216-5.
- Weintraub, Stanley (1997). Uncrowned King: The Life of Prince Albert. London: John Murray Inc. ISBN 0-7195-5756-9.
- Zeepvat, Charlotte (July 2000). "The Queen and Uncle E". Royalty Digest. X (109): 1–7. Archived from the original on 19 September 2009.

Ernest II of Saxe-Coburg and Gotha House of Saxe-Coburg and Gotha Cadet branch of the House of Wettin Born: 21 June 1818 Died: 22 August 1893
German royalty
Preceded by Ernst I	Duke of Saxe-Coburg and Gotha; 29 January 1844 – 22 August 1893	Succeeded by Alfred
