= Black raven =

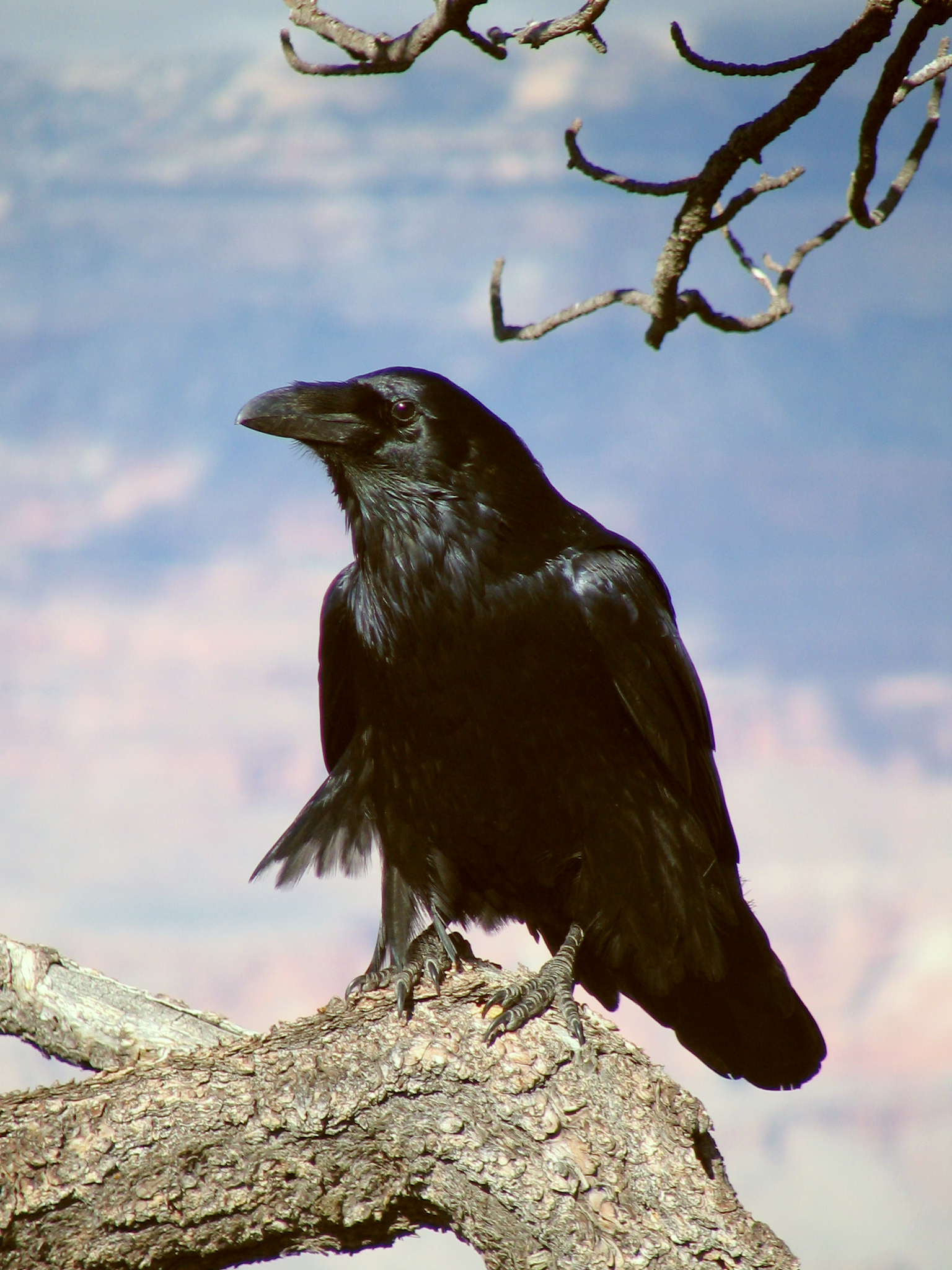

Black raven or Black Raven, also Chornyi voron may refer to:

== Literature and film ==
- The Black Raven, 1943 American mystery film
- The Black Raven, fantasy novel from the Deverry Cycle by Katharine Kerr
- "Black Raven", 2002 TV film by Russian director Andrei Kravchuk
- Chornyi voron ("Black raven"), 2009 Ukrainian historical novel by Vasyl Shkliar
- Chornyi voron, 2019 Ukrainian film by the novel
- Gagak Item ("Black Raven"), 1939 bandit film from the Dutch East Indies (now Indonesia)
- "Den sorte Ravn" (The Black Raven, 1861), a poem by Teckla Juel

== Music ==
- Black Raven (band), German rock band
- "Black Raven", bonus track of a reissue of Heart on Snow by the British singer/songwriter Marc Almond
- "Black raven" ("Chornyi voron"), Russian folk song
- Black Raven, track on Tempest (Balflare album)

== People ==
- Chornyi voron (Black Raven), nom de guerre of Ivan Chornousov, a warlord in Ukraine during the Russian Civil War
- Black Raven, nickname of Graham Webb, English racing cyclist
- Markus "Black Raven" Vainionpää, an Air Guitar World Champion

== Other ==
- Black Raven Brewing Company, brewing company based in Washington state, United States
- Attack Drone Battalion "Black Raven" of the 93rd Mechanized Brigade (Ukraine)
- Black Raven (ex-Dutch Zwarte Raaf), an early warship of the English navy
- Schwarzer Rabe (Czarny Kruk) ("Black Raven") of Lithuanian Navy

== See also ==
- The Raven (disambiguation)
