= Ravens =

Ravens may refer to:

- Raven, a species of the genus Corvus of passerine birds

== Sports ==
- Anderson Ravens, the intercollegiate athletic program of Anderson University in Indiana
- Baltimore Ravens, a professional American football franchise
- Benedictine Ravens, the official mascot of Benedictine College
- Carleton Ravens, the intercollegiate athletic program of Carleton University in Canada
- Munich Ravens, German american-football team in the European League of Football
- Quincy Ravens, an 1890s minor league baseball team in Illinois
- Vancouver Ravens, a team that used to play in the National Lacrosse League

== Other uses ==
- Ravens (2017 film), a Swedish thriller film
- Ravens (2024 film), a Japanese-language British biographical drama film
- The Ravens, an American R&B music band
- "The Ravens", a song by Bathory from Blood on Ice
- "Ravens", a song by Patti Smith from Gone Again
- Ravens, a 2009 novel by George Dawes Green
- Korparna, or The Ravens, a 2011 novel by Tomas Bannerhed
- The Ravens (Norwegian: Ravnene), a 2011 novel by Vidar Sundstøl
- The Ravens, a 2020 novel by Kass Morgan and Danielle Paige

== People with the surname ==
- Jan Ravens (born 1958), an English actress and impressionist
- Karl Ravens (1927-2017), German politician

== See also ==
- Raven (disambiguation)
- Raven's Progressive Matrices, an intelligence test
