= Paul Raven =

Paul Raven may refer to:

- Paul Raven (musician) (1961–2007), British bassist mostly known for his work with the punk/rock band Killing Joke
- Paul Raven, pseudonym of English musician Paul Gadd, better known as Gary Glitter
- Paul Raven (footballer) (born 1970), English football player

== See also ==
- Paul (given name)
- Raven (surname)
