= Rave (disambiguation) =

A rave is a kind of dance party.

Rave or Raves may also refer to:

== Geography ==
- Raves, Vosges, a commune in the Vosges département in France

== Related to rave parties ==
- Free party, an illegal rave

== Art, entertainment, and media ==
- Rave (film), a 2000 American film written and directed by Ron Krauss
- Rave (magazine), a British music magazine
- Rave (board game)
- Rave Master, a 1999 anime and manga franchise, also known as Groove Adventure Rave
- Rave Motion Pictures, a defunct movie theater company that is now part of Cinemark since 2013
- Raves (band), a 1980s power pop group from Atlanta, Georgia, United States
- The Rave, a concert venue in Milwaukee, Wisconsin, United States
- Rave music
- Dave "Rave" Ogilvie, a Canadian record producer, mixer, songwriter, and musician

== People with the surname ==
- Klaus Rave (born 1950), German lawyer and professor
- Ute Erdsiek-Rave (born 1947), German politician

== Other ==
- Rave (apple), also known as MN55 and First Kiss, an apple cultivar developed in Minnesota

== See also ==
- RAVE (disambiguation)
- Raven (disambiguation)
- Raver (disambiguation)
- Raves (disambiguation)
