= USS Osprey (AM-56) =

Minesweeper of the United States Navy

Coordinates: 50°12′N 1°20′W

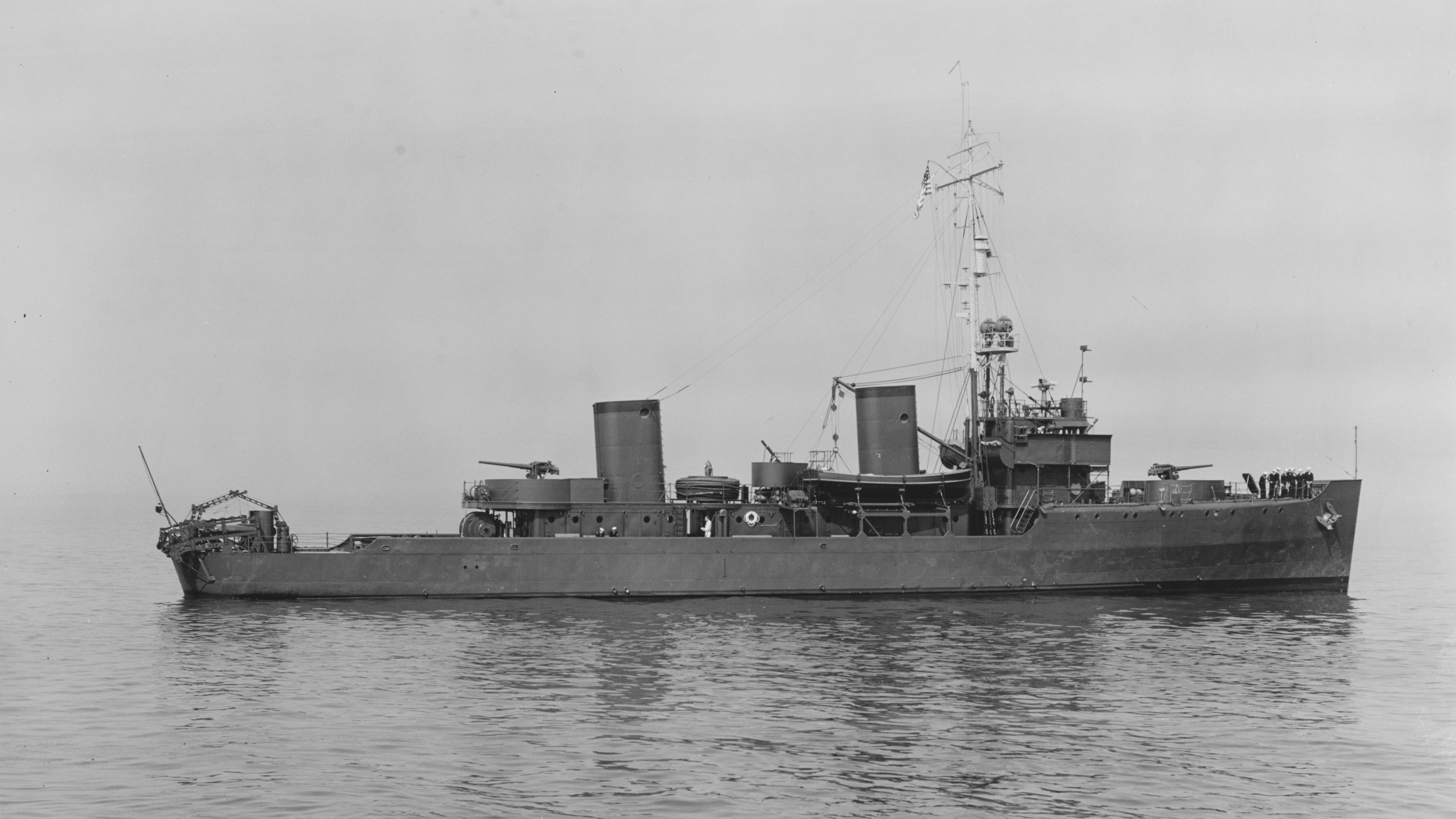
- USS Osprey (AM-56) off the Norfolk Navy Yard, 19 April 1941

History

United States
- Name: USS Osprey
- Builder: Norfolk Navy Yard, Virginia
- Laid down: 28 June 1939
- Launched: 24 August 1940
- Commissioned: 16 December 1940
- Stricken: 22 August 1944
- Honors and awards: 2 Battle Stars (World War II)
- Fate: Struck a mine and sunk, 5 June 1944

General characteristics
- Class & type: Raven-class minesweeper
- Displacement: 810 tons; 1040 tons full load
- Length: 220 ft 6 in (67.21 m)
- Beam: 32 ft 2 in (9.80 m)
- Draft: 9 ft 4 in (2.84 m)
- Speed: 18 knots (33 km/h)
- Complement: 105 officers and men
- Armament: 2 × 3 in (76 mm) guns, 2 × depth charge tracks

USS Osprey (AM–56), was a Raven-class minesweeper of the United States Navy, laid down on 28 June 1939 at the Norfolk Navy Yard, Virginia; launched on 24 August 1940; sponsored by Ms. Margaret Kays; and commissioned on 16 December 1940.

== Service career ==
The United States' entrance into World War II extended Osprey's coastal patrol and escort duties first to the Caribbean area, and by 8 November to North Africa. On "D-Day" of "Operation Torch" she helped direct and protect the waves of landing craft moving shoreward at Port Lyautey, Morocco. Anti-submarine patrol off Casablanca preceded her return to another year of coastal escort assignments out of Norfolk, Virginia.

On 3 April 1944, the minesweeper departed for England to take part in "Operation Overlord". With other units of Minesweeper Squadron 7 (MinRon 7), she had successfully conducted sweeping operations off Tor Bay, England. "At about 1700 on 5 June, minesweeper USS Osprey hit a mine that blew a large hole in the forward engine room. Fires broke out and at 1815 the ship had to be abandoned. Osprey sank soon after with the loss of six men." These were the first casualties of the D-Day invasion. She was struck from the Naval Vessel Register on 22 August.

The wreck was first dived and identified by a team including nautical archaeologist Innes McCartney in 1997. It was found to be lying on its side.

In 2019, the Osprey's ships bell was turned in to British authorities after pictures of it appeared online.

== Awards ==
Osprey received two battle stars for World War II service.
