= RAVE =

RAVE may refer to:

- RAVE (survey) (Radial Velocity Experiment), spectroscopic astronomical survey
- RAVE (known as Rave Master in English), a manga series
- Radiation associated vascular ectasia, an alternative term for radiation proctitis, a medical condition associated with chronic radiation exposure to the rectum
- Reducing Americans' Vulnerability to Ecstasy Act (RAVE Act)
- Rendering Acceleration Virtual Engine, a low-level interface to 3D graphics cards for Mac OS and MorphOS
- Routing Audio Via Ethernet, a brand of audio over Ethernet

== See also ==
- Rave (disambiguation)
