= Raver =

Raver or ravers may refer to:

== Places ==
- Raver, Maharashtra, a city in India
- Raver (Vidhan Sabha constituency)
- Raver (Lok Sabha constituency)

== People ==
- Kim Raver (born 1969), American actress
- Lorna Raver (1943–2025), American actress

== Comics ==
- Raver (comic), a 1993 comic book mini-series written by Walter Koenig and published by Malibu Comics
  - The Raver, superhero protagonist of the comic
- Ravers, fictional spirits in the 1970s–1980s fantasy novel series "The Chronicles of Thomas Covenant, the Unbeliever" by Stephen R. Donaldson
- The Ravers, the name of a team of DC Comics superheroes in a short-lived 1990s comic book series Superboy and the Ravers

== Music ==
- Raver, someone who attends a rave
- "The Raver", a music gossip column published in the 1960s and 1970s in the consumer music weekly Melody Maker and now as an online column
- "Ravers", a song by Quiet Riot from their 1977 self-titled album
- The Ravers, the original name of 1970s new wave band The Nails
- "Ravers", a song by Steel Pulse from the album True Democracy

== See also ==
- Rave (disambiguation)
- The Rave-Ups
- Raven (disambiguation)
