= USS Raven =

USS Raven have been the names of more than one United States Navy ship, and may refer to:

- USS Raven (1813), a schooner in commission from 1813 to 1815
- USS Raven (AM-49), a planned Lapwing-class minesweeper from Baltimore Dry Dock and Shipbuilding Company; construction canceled 4 December 1918
- USS Raven (AM-55), a minesweeper in commission from 1940 to 1946, lead unit of the Raven class
- USS Raven (MHC-61), a coastal minehunter commissioned in 1998 and stricken in 2007

== See also ==
- USS Raven III, a patrol boat, renamed USS SP-103 soon after commissioning, in commission from 1917 to 1919
- USS Julius A. Raven, a high speed transport
