= David Raven =

David Raven may refer to:

- David Raven (actor) (1909–1971), English actor
- David Raven (footballer) (born 1985), English football player
- Maisie Trollette (David Raven, 1933–2025), British drag queen
- David Raven, American drummer with The Swirling Eddies
