= Jon Raven =

British writer

- Born: Cardiff, Wales
- Died: Compton, Wolverhampton
- Occupations: Author; Musician
- Children: Paul Raven; Daniel Raven
- Relatives: Michael Raven (brother)

Jon Raven (1940–2015) was an English author and musician.

== Early life ==
Jon Raven was the brother of author and musician Michael Raven, father of the late Ministry and Killing Joke bassist Paul Raven, and Gundogs bassist Daniel Raven. Raven was born in Wales and educated at Wolverhampton Municipal Grammar School. His wife was Kate, of Tettenhall, Wolverhampton. Alongside brother, Michael, Jon formed a Wolverhampton folk music group before producing records and books and making television and radio appearances. He was diagnosed with Parkinson's disease in 1996 and died in August 2015 at Compton Hospice in Wolverhampton.

== Writing ==
Raven is the author of non-fiction books, the majority related to Black Country history, customs, folklore and music and on industry typical of the Black Country area such as coal mining and nail making.

His books include The Folklore and Songs of the Black Country Colliers, Customs of the Black Country, and Aynuk's First Black Country Waerd Book.

== Bibliography ==
- Folk Songs of the Black Country – Wolverhampton Folk Song Club, 1964
- Folklore and Songs of the Black Country and West Midlands Volume I – Wolverhampton Folk Song Club, 1965
- Folklore and Songs of the Black Country and West Midlands Volume II – Wolverhampton Folk Song Club, 1966
- Folklore and Songs of the Black Country and West Midlands Volume III – Wolverhampton Folk Song Club, 1967
- Kate of Coalbrookdale – 1971
- Songs of a Changing World – Ginn & Co., 1972
- Canal Songs – 1974
- Turpin Hero – 1974
- The Nailmakers – The Black Country Society, 1975
- The Rigs of the Fair: Popular Sports and Pastimes in the Nineteenth Century through Songs, Ballads and Contemporary Accounts (Resources of Music) – Cambridge University Press, 1976
- The Urban and Industrial Songs of the Black Country and Birmingham – Broadside Books, 1977
- The Folklore of Staffordshire (The folklore of the British Isles) – Batsford, 1978
- Victoria's Inferno: Songs of the Old Mills, Mines, Manufactories, Canals and Railways – Broadside Books, 1978
- Tales from Aynuk's Black Country – Broadside Books, 1978
- Aynuk's First Black Country Waerd Book – Broadside Books, 1978
- Aynuk's Second Black Country Waerd Book – Broadside Books, 1979
- Black Country Songs and Rhymes: v. 1 – Broadside Books, 1979
- Theodore – 1984
- Black Country and Staffordshire: Stories, Customs, Superstitions, Tales and Folklore – Broadside Books, 1986
- Customs of the Black Country – Broadside Books, 1987
- The Book of the Black Country – Broadside Books, 1988
- Tettenhall – Broadside Books, 1989
- The Folklore and Songs of the Black Country Colliers – Broadside Books, 1990

=== Music ===
Raven was a member of folk trio The Black Country Three along with brother Michael Raven and Derek Craft. They recorded their self-titled debut album in 1966 for Transatlantic. Following this, Raven produced several solo and group CDs.

He performed on the following albums:

- The Black Country Three by The Black Country Three (1966)
- Songs Of The Black Country And West Midlands by Jon Raven, Michael Raven & Jean Ward (1968)
- Jon Raven & The Halliard by Jon Raven & The Halliard (Nic Jones, Dave Moran & Nigel Paterson) (1968) (Later reissued on CD with "The Jolly Machine")
- Kate of Coalbrookdale by Jon Raven, Michael Raven and Jean Ward (1971)
- Ballad of the Black Country by Jon Raven, John Kirkpatrick, David Oxley and Mike Billington (1975)
- The Bold Navigators by Jon Raven, John Kirkpatrick, Sue Harris, Gary & Vera Aspey 1975)
- Harvest by Jon Raven, supported by Dave Oxley and Nigel M Jones (1976)
- Steam Ballads by Jon Raven, Harry Boardman, Kempion, and Tony Rose (1977)
- Fragile Life by Jon Raven, supported by Daniel Raven and Gavin Monaghan (1995)
