= Raven (picture book) =

Book by Gerald McDermott

Raven: A Trickster Tale From The Pacific Northwest
- Author: Gerald McDermott
- Illustrator: Gerald McDermott
- Language: English
- Genre: Picture Book
- Publisher: Voyager Books
- Publication date: 1993
- Publication place: United States
- Media type: Print
- Pages: 29 pp
- ISBN: 978-0-15-265661-4

Raven: A Trickster Tale From The Pacific Northwest is a 1993 children's picture book told and illustrated by Gerald McDermott using a totemic art style. Raven: A Trickster Tale From The Northwest is the tale of a shape-changing Raven using his abilities to steal the light and was a Caldecott Medal Honor Book in 1994 and a Boston Globe-Horn Book Honor Book in 1993.

== Plot ==
The Raven arrives in a world of darkness and resolves to find the light, going on an adventure and using his smarts to take the light back with him.Raven is a trickster who does anything to get what he wants.

== Synopsis ==
The Raven came to a world covered in darkness, where men and women lived in an area of dark and cold. The Raven felt bad for the people living in the dark and resolved to search for the light. The Raven flew across mountains, rivers, and valleys until finally, he saw light. He had arrived at the house of the Sky Chief, which was shining brilliantly in the horizon. The Raven snuck into the house of the Sky Chief by turning into a pine-needle and fell into the water of the Sky Chief's beautiful daughter. The daughter drank the water and unknowingly swallowed the Raven. Time passed and she soon gave birth to a child, that bore a striking resemblance to the Raven. The Raven used his child disguise to locate and secure the Sun, stealing it from the Sky Chief and returning to the land of darkness. The Raven threw the Sun into the sky, where it stayed filling the area a bright light. People feed the Raven today as a way to say thanks for bringing light to them.

== Characters ==
Raven:

- A shape-changing Raven who went out looking for the light to bring it to the people so as to get rid of the darkness that enveloped the land. The Raven was smart and able to trick the Sky Chief into giving him the Sun, throwing it into the sky to make light for the people.

Sky Chief's Daughter:

- A beautiful young girl that was tricked by the Raven into giving birth to him as a boy child after drinking water with the Raven, shape-changed into a pine needle, in it.

Sky Chief:

- An elderly man and ruler of the light who played with the Raven (in his child form), whom he saw as a grandchild and carved toys for him.

== Critical reception ==
Publishers Weekly said, "With this masterfully executed reworking, McDermott adds to the folktale bookshelf a work in the grand tradition." Horn Book Magazine stating that "The naive view suits the simplicity of the scheme, and the mythic elements of the story are masterfully rendered." In a section of The New York Times Gerald McDermott is praised along with his works of fiction saying, "McDermott is not only a picture-book artist of the first-rank, but also one of our most gifted retellers of myth and folk tale."

== Awards ==
- Caldecott Honor
- ALA Notable Children's Book
- Boston Globe-Horn Book Honor

== See also ==
- 1993 in literature
- Children's Literature
- Raven Tales
