= Charles Raven =

Charles Raven may refer to:

- Charles E. Raven (1885–1964), English theologian, academic and pacifist
- Charles Edmund Raven (died 1940), Canadian politician
