= The Raven (Harold Kionka) =

American journalist

The Raven (Harold Kionka) is involved with web television, Internet radio, and citizen journalism. The Raven claims to have reported on Daytona Beach events via video broadcasts through a Web TV station as far back as 2000.

== History ==
- 1998: The Raven started and ran Albuquerque's first Internet radio station "Route 66 LIVE".
- 2000: The Raven started Daytona Beach Live. The station showed video about life, events, and attractions in the Daytona Beach area for the 17,000 viewers. Events included the Daytona Beach Bike Week, hurricanes, Birthplace of Speed, Black College Reunion, Great Race, Florida International Festival, Biketoberfest, Spaceshuttle launches, Power Boat Races, Rock Bands, and more.
- 2003: The Raven launched Galaxy Universe TV to provide live streaming video overlooking the beach on South Atlantic Avenue
- 2004: The Raven simulcast across a network of three Internet TV stations for the 2004 Biketoberfest.
- 2005: The Raven was featured in Chapter # 8, of the book, "DARKNET Hollywoods War against the Digital Generation"
- 2008: The Raven relocated to Adrian, Michigan and formed the existing Internet TV stations into the Raven World Communications. He continues to report on local events in Adrian.
