= Michael Raven (author) =

English writer and musician

- Born: Michael Raven; 1938; Cardiff, Wales
- Died: 15 April 2008; Staffordshire, England
- Resting place: St. John the Baptist Church, Ashley, Staffordshire
- Occupations: Author; Musician; Composer; Poet
- Known for: Guitar arrangements
- Notable work: (1,000) English Country Dance Tunes; A Guide to Staffordshire & the Black Country; A Guide to Shropshire; A Guide to Herefordshire; books on English Folk Guitar
- Style: Fingerstyle guitar, specialising in Flamenco
- Spouse: Eve Raven
- Parent(s): Leonard & Marion Raven
- Relatives: Jon Raven (brother); Paul Raven (nephew)

Michael Raven was an English author, musician, composer and poet.

== Biography ==
Michael Raven was born to Lancastrian parents in Cardiff, Wales but moved to the West Midlands when he was 3 years old. A talented sportsman, he became Midlands Decathlon Champion in 1954 at the age of 16 whilst a boarder at Towyn Grammar School. Michael did National Service with the Cheshire Regiment and saw active service in Malaya during the 1956 Emergency. Upon leaving the Army Michael continued his education at Keele University, Staffordshire. He met Eve, a Brighton girl, in Jersey whilst playing in cabaret in 1963, and married her in Gibraltar in 1965. With his brother Jon he collected and researched the folk music of the area. He was heavily involved in the folk scene, and worked as Mary Hopkins' accompanist during a summer season in Margate in 1971. as well as collaborating with brother, Jon Raven, and other artists. Throughout his life, Raven wrote 80 books, and featured on 50 CDs. He died in 2008 at the age of 70. He was the uncle of musician Paul Raven, died one year earlier.

=== Writing ===
Raven wrote and contributed to many books, often featuring his own photography as well as research. He was in the main a music publisher/composer/arranger and some of his books relate to Black Country and West Midlands history, traditions and music.

==== Bibliography ====
- "Folklore and songs of the Black Country: Folk out of focus; being a brief resume of the little known folk lore of the Black Country and Staffordshire" – Wolverhampton Folk Song Club, 1965
- "Folk-lore and songs of the Black Country & West Midlands" – Wolverhampton Folk Song Club, 1967
- "Eight Traditional Tunes in Tablature: Easy But Effective Arrangements for Solo Guitar of British Folk Tunes" – Michael Raven, 1975
- "Popular Tunes for Guitar: Bk. 1: 8 Popular Tunes and a Welsh Fantasy Concert Guitar Solo in Staff Notation and Tablature" – Michael Raven, 1977
- "A Shropshire Lad. The Poems of A.E.Housman set to music" - Michael Raven, 1978
- "Popular Songs for Guitar: Bk. 2: 17 Well Known Songs Arranged for Solo Guitar in Staff Notation and Tablature" – Michael Raven, 1982
- "English Folk Guitar: Volume 3" – Michael Raven, 1984
- "One Thousand English Country Dance Tunes" – Michael Raven, 1984
- "Staffordshire and the Black Country: A Gazetteer" – Michael Raven, 1988
- "Shropshire Portraits: 58 Landscape Photographs of Shropshire with Captions" – Michael Raven, 1989
- "Chant of Falsity: 25 Exotic Dances and Irish Music Arranged for Solo Guitar in Staff Notation and Tablature" – Michael Raven, 1991
- "Jolly Machine: 23 Songs of Industrial Protest and Social Discontent from the West Midlands" – Michael Raven, 1991
- "Raven's Nest: 41 Rural, Industrial and Contemporary Folk Songs with Some Guitar Accompaniments in Tablature" – Michael Raven, 1991
- "A Variety of Guitar Music: A Selection of Pieces from the Original Best-selling Book Redrawn in Staff Notation and Tablature" – Michael Raven, 1991
- "Black Country: Towns and Villages" – Broadside Books, 1991
- "Wizard Beguildy: 35 English Folk Songs and Country Dances Arranged for Solo Guitar in Staff Notation and Tablature" – Michael Raven, 1992
- "Welsh Guitar: Solo Guitar Arrangements of Welsh Songs and Dances in Staff Notation and Tablature" – Michael Raven, 1994
- "A Guide to Herefordshire" – Michael Raven, 1996
- "Song of the Fox: Poems, Songs and Ballads by Michael Raven" – Michael Raven, 1996
- "Reynardine – Songs and Dance Tunes of a Popular Folk Band" – Michael Raven, 1996
- "Popular Songs for Guitar: Bk. 1" – Michael Raven, 1996
- "Tin Whistle Tutor" – Michael Raven, 1996
- "Shropshire in Pictures" – Michael Raven, 1997
- "Cheshire in Pictures" – Michael Raven, 1997
- "One Thousand English Country Dance Tunes" – Michael Raven, 1999
- "Land of Lost Content: Folk Songs and Settings of Poems by English Poets" – Michael Raven, 1999
- "A Guide to Staffordshire and the Black Country the Potteries & the Peak" – Michael Raven, 2004
- "A Guide to Shropshire" – Michael Raven, 2005
- "A Good Christmas Box: Christmas Carols Published in 1847 in Dudley" – Michael Raven, 2007
- "West Midlands' Ballads" – Michael Raven, 2008
- "English Folk Guitar, Songs and Instrumentals: Bk. 1: Off the Record Transcriptions of 44 Songs and Guitar Solos in Staff Notation and Tablature" – Michael Raven, 2006
- "English Folk Guitar Songs and Instrumentals: Bk. 2" – Michael Raven, 2006
- Lucy's Frolic – arrangements of English Country Dance tunes in staff notation & tablature – Michael Raven 1992
- Star of Belle Isle – 44 titles for solo guitar in tablature & staff notation – Michael Raven 1992
- Silent Field – 36 pieces for solo guitar in staff notation & tablature – Michael Raven 1992
- Soulton Hall – 36 aires, dances & cafe songs for solo guitar. Staff notation & tablature – Michael Raven 1992
- Delbury Dervish – 36 pieces for solo guitar including 14 hymns and 9 Thomas Hardy fiddle tunes – Michael Raven 1992
- A Variety of Guitar Music Book 2 – Michael Raven
- A Variety of Guitar Music Book 3 – Michael Raven
- The Complete Guitarist- guitar tutor Michael Raven (9th printing) 1999
- The Guitarist's Good Book – secular songs & hymns – Michael Raven
- Popular Tunes for Guitar Book 2 (2nd edn.) – Michael Raven 2007
- The Chant of Falsity – 25 pieces in many different styles. Staff notation & tablature – Michael Raven
- Popular Music for Guitar – a selection of 36 well-known tunes. Staff notation & tablature – Michael Raven
- Popular Classics for Guitar – 24 studies, Carcassi, J.S. Bach, Sor, Guilliani, Carulli. – Michael Raven
- Easy Duets for Guitar-Joseph Kuffner Opus 80 & Opus 87 edited Michael Raven
- Michael Raven:Guitar Music Books 1&2 – Michael Raven 1991
- Michael Raven:Guitar music Books 3&4 – Michael Raven 1991
- Music for Guitar – 155 arrangements of guitar music by Michael Raven – Michael Raven
- An English Collection for Guitar – 11 pieces in staff notation & tablature – Michael Raven
- English Folk Guitar Book 2 (2nd edn.) 37 tunes devoted to solo guitar playing – Michael Raven 2007
- English Folk Guitar Book 4 – transcriptions of 28 guitar solos, songs & accompaniments from the CD Recital – Michael Raven
- John O'Barbary – 32 traditional songs & dance tunes – Michael Raven 2007
- Staffordshire in Colour Photographs – Michael Raven 2006
- Shropshire in Colour Photographs and a second collection of Poems – Michael Raven 2006
- A Guide to Shropshire (including Telford & the Welsh Borders) 3rd revised edn. – Michael Raven 2006
- The Ross Workhouse Songbook – Michael Raven
- Tarlton's Jests – the humour of Elizabeth 1's Court Jester – edited Michael Raven
- Popular Songs for Recorder – 32 tunes with lasting appeal – Michael Raven 1977
- Popular Songs for Recorder Book 2 – Michael Raven
- Popular Tunes for Recorder – Michael Raven

=== Music ===
Raven was a member of folk trio The Black Country Three along with brother Jon Raven and Derek Craft, recording their self-titled debut album in 1966 for Transatlantic. Raven worked in folk-roots trio, Ravenshead.

He has performed on the following albums:

- The Black Country Three by The Black Country Three (1966)
- The Halliard by Jon Raven / The Jolly Machine (1968)
- Death and the Lady by Michael Raven and Joan Mills (1972)
- Hymn to Che Guevara by Michael Raven (1974)
- Songs and Solos by Michael Raven and Joan Mills (MR68 - 1993)
- My Old Friend by Michael Raven with guest Joan Mills and Johnny Collins (1998)
- Outlaw of Loch Lene by Michael Raven and Joan Mills (1999)
- Gipsy English – Solo Guitar by Michael Raven (2000)
- Retrospective – solo guitar by Michael Raven
- Welsh Guitar – solo guitar by Michael Raven
- Taming the Dragon's Strings – solo guitar by Michael Raven
