= USS Raven (AM-55) =

Minesweeper of the United States Navy

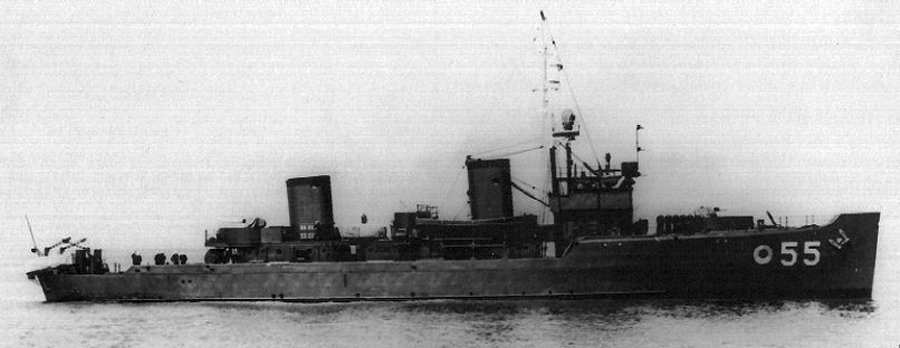

History

United States
- Builder: Norfolk Navy Yard; Portsmouth, Virginia
- Laid down: 28 June 1939
- Launched: 24 August 1940
- Sponsored by: Miss Elizabeth Scott Baker
- Commissioned: 11 November 1940
- Decommissioned: 31 May 1946
- Reclassified: MSF-55, 7 February 1955
- Stricken: 1 May 1967
- Fate: Sunk as a target, 30 July 1969

General characteristics
- Class & type: Raven-class minesweeper
- Displacement: 810 tons; 1040 tons full load
- Length: 220 ft 6 in (67.21 m)
- Beam: 32 ft 2 in (9.80 m)
- Draft: 9 ft 4 in (2.84 m)
- Speed: 18 knots (33 km/h)
- Complement: 105 officers and men
- Armament: 1 × 3"/50 caliber gun; 2 × 40 mm AA guns; 4 x 20mm Oerlikon AA guns; 2 x Mk20 ASW rocket-launchers (24 rounds each)

USS Raven (AM-55), the lead ship of her class of minesweeper, was the second ship of the United States Navy to be named for the raven. Her keel was laid down on 28 June 1939 by the Norfolk Navy Yard in Portsmouth, Virginia. She was launched on 24 August 1940 sponsored by Miss Elizabeth Scott Baker, and commissioned on 11 November 1940.

== Service history ==
=== 1940-1945 World War II ===
Following shakedown, Raven was assigned to Mine Division 21 and operated out of Norfolk, Virginia, engaged in training, patrol, and escort of ships to and from port until 14 March 1941. She then escorted a convoy to Portsmouth, New Hampshire, and several convoys between Norfolk and Newport, Rhode Island. She resumed local operations out of Norfolk from 23 July 1941 to April 1942. In April 1942, serving as antisubmarine screen, she made runs to Halifax, Nova Scotia, and Portland, Maine.

She then extended her range to the Panama Canal Zone, and on her return resumed coastal escort runs to Boston, Massachusetts, Portland, Maine, and Sydney, Nova Scotia. Returning to Norfolk 8 July, she made three escort runs to Bermuda, then, in September, operated off the coast of New England and the Maritime Provinces.

Back at Norfolk at the end of September, Raven departed Chesapeake Bay on 23 October in company with other U.S. warships and a convoy and proceeded to North Africa. Arriving on 8 November 1942, she participated in sweeping, antisubmarine, antiaircraft, and landing operations in support of the invasion of Morocco, continuing those duties until 21 February 1943. Raven then departed African waters in the escorting screen of a Norfolk-bound convoy.

Arriving 14 March she conducted local patrol, coastwise and Caribbean Sea escort operations until April 1944. Raven then departed Norfolk, and proceeded with other U.S. warships and a convoy to England to prepare for the invasion of France.

On 5 June Raven proceeded to her assigned area off Normandy and participated in the sweep of the fire control area for Utah Beach. From this time until August she was active in clearing approach channels to the Normandy beachheads.

In August 1944 she sailed to Oran, thence to Naples, Italy. From then until June 1945 she performed sweeping and patrol duty in the Straits of Bonifacio, clearing the way for ships en route to the invasion of southern France, and sweeping off the French Riviera and Italian Riviera and off Corsica. During the entire European operation, including D-Day, Raven swept 21 German and Italian naval mines.

=== 1945-1969 Decommissioning, reclassification and disposal ===
In June 1945, Raven returned to Norfolk, and after overhaul, departed Norfolk 1 October 1945 and proceeded to San Pedro, California, where she remained through November. She arrived at Portland, Oregon, on 1 December, but returned to San Diego, California, by the end of the month. On 31 May 1946 Raven was decommissioned and placed in reserve at San Diego. Reclassified MSF-55, 7 February 1955, she remained berthed at San Diego until struck from the Naval Vessel Register on 1 May 1967. On 30 July 1969 she was sunk as a target in deep water off the coast of southern California by the battleship New Jersey.

== Honours ==
Raven earned three battle stars for World War II service.
