= Raven (novel) =

2025 book

- Author: Robert T. Kelley
- Language: English
- Genre: Thriller, espionage
- Publisher: High Frequency Press
- Publication date: October 28, 2025
- Publication place: United States
- Media type: Print (hardcover and paperback), e-book
- Pages: 312
- ISBN: 978-1-962931-35-9

Raven is a 2025 thriller novel by American author Robert T. Kelley. It is Kelley's debut novel. Set in 1990 during the waning days of the Cold War and the early development of the internet, the story involves espionage, computer hacking, and a struggle for technological dominance.

== Plot ==
The novel follows Mev Hayes, a female computer prodigy and engineer expelled from college for hacking, who lands a position at an MIT lab. She becomes entangled in a conspiracy involving a hacker codenamed Raven who is selling high-technology secrets to the Soviet Union. The story features FBI agents, mobsters, and spies, exploring themes of innovation, exploitation, power, trust, and morality in the tech industry.

== Development ==
The novel draws inspiration from real-life early hackers such as Kevin Mitnick and Markus Hess. The technology created by the protagonist is based on the Security Analysis Tool for Auditing Networks (SATAN), a vulnerability scanner developed by Dan Farmer in 1995.

== Reception ==
Raven received positive reviews from critics. Kirkus Reviews called it "a well-spun morality tale that also believably combines academia with spy thriller intrigue," praising its characterization and the author's knowledge of the tech world. Readers' Favorite described it as "a gripping crime thriller" with "not a single dull moment," highlighting the dense narrative packed with mystery, intrigue, and action. BookLife Reviews noted it as a "gripping techno-thriller combining high-stakes drama with smart storytelling," though mentioning the plot can sometimes be weighed down by multiple threads.

The book was mentioned in local media, including an author talk event at the Jackson Memorial Library covered by PenBay Pilot.
