= Ernst Raven =

Ernest Raven
- Ernst Raven

Consul of Saxe-Coburg and Gotha in Texas
- In office 1838–1865
- Monarch: Ernst II
- Preceded by: Position established

Personal details
- Born: 23 Aug 1804
- Died: 18 Sep 1881 (aged 77)

Ernst or Ernest Raven (1804–1881) was an immigrant from Germany who became a prominent resident of Texas; he served as consul for the German Duchy of Saxe-Coburg-Gotha in the Republic of Texas and the state for many years. Married Johanne Freideriche AUGUSTA Mentzel on February 7, 1830 in Saxe-Coburg, Gotha Germany.

He was bookbinder to the Duke before moving to Baltimore, Maryland in 1838. Raven moved to what was then the Republic of Texas in 1844 and settled in Milam County. In 1846 he was one of the signers of a petition to the Governor of Texas for the relocation of trading posts with the Indian tribes. He relocated permanently to Austin, Texas in 1848, where he resumed bookbinding and served as a city alderman. In 1853 Raven was hired for contract work on furniture in the Texas State Senate chamber. Raven was mentioned in Frederick Law Olmsted's 1857 account of his journey through Texas. At the time of Olmsted's visit to Austin, Raven was offering a $100 reward for return of a stolen horse.

During the period when Texas was an independent republic, Ernst II, Duke of Saxe-Coburg and Gotha had appointed Raven to the position of consul for Texas. He continued that role when Texas joined the United States in 1845. He was reappointed to Texas in February 1861, when Texas was again an independent country and before it joined the Confederacy. The Duke never appointed him to the Confederacy itself. Confederate Secretary of State Judah Benjamin reported to the Confederate Congress, on September 22, 1862, that Raven was the only consul to request permission to act from the Richmond Government:

The one agent who is excepted from these remarks is Ernst Raven esq., who was appointed consul for the State of Texas by his highness the Duke of Saxe-Coburg and Gotha, and who applied to this Government for an exequatur on 30 July 1861

Raven's appointment assigned him to Austin, Texas.

== Did Saxe-Coburg-Gotha recognize the C.S.A.? ==
The Confederate Secretary of State, Judah P. Benjamin, on October 8, 1863, describes the Confederate position on the status of consuls under international law:

When the Confederacy was first formed, there were in our ports a number of British Consuls and Consular Agents, who had been recognized as such, not only by the Government of the United States, which was then the authorized agent of the several States for that purpose, but by the State authorities themselves. Under the law of nations, these officials are not entitled to exercise political or diplomatic functions, nor are they ever accredited to the sovereigns within whose dominions they reside. Their only warrant of authority is the commission of their own government; but usage requires that those who have the full grade of Consul should not exercise their functions within the territory of any sovereign before receiving his permission in the form of an exequatur; while consular agents of inferior grade simply notify the local authorities of their intention to act in that capacity. It has not been customary upon any change of government, to interfere with these commercial officials, already established in the discharge of their duties, and it is their recognized obligation to treat all governments which may be established, de facto, over the ports where they reside, as governments de jure.

Several other European nations (chiefly Great Britain) also maintained consuls in the Confederacy, but these were appointed previously to the United States Government; several acting consuls were, however, quietly accepted and permitted to act, before the Confederacy made an issue of this in May 1863.

Many in the south saw Raven's appointment as a recognition of the Confederate States. This item appeared in several newspapers-

Our First Friend.--It may not be generally known that at least one government has recognized the Confederate States. In a recent letter of Mr. Benjamin, our Secretary of State, we perceive that Ernst Raven, Esq., who was appointed Consul for the State of Texas, by his Highness, the Duke of Saxe Coburg and Gotha, and who applied to this government for an exequatur on the 30th of July, 1861, had one issued to him on the 21st of August, 1861.
