= Raven-class minesweeper =

Class of two U.S. Navy minesweepers

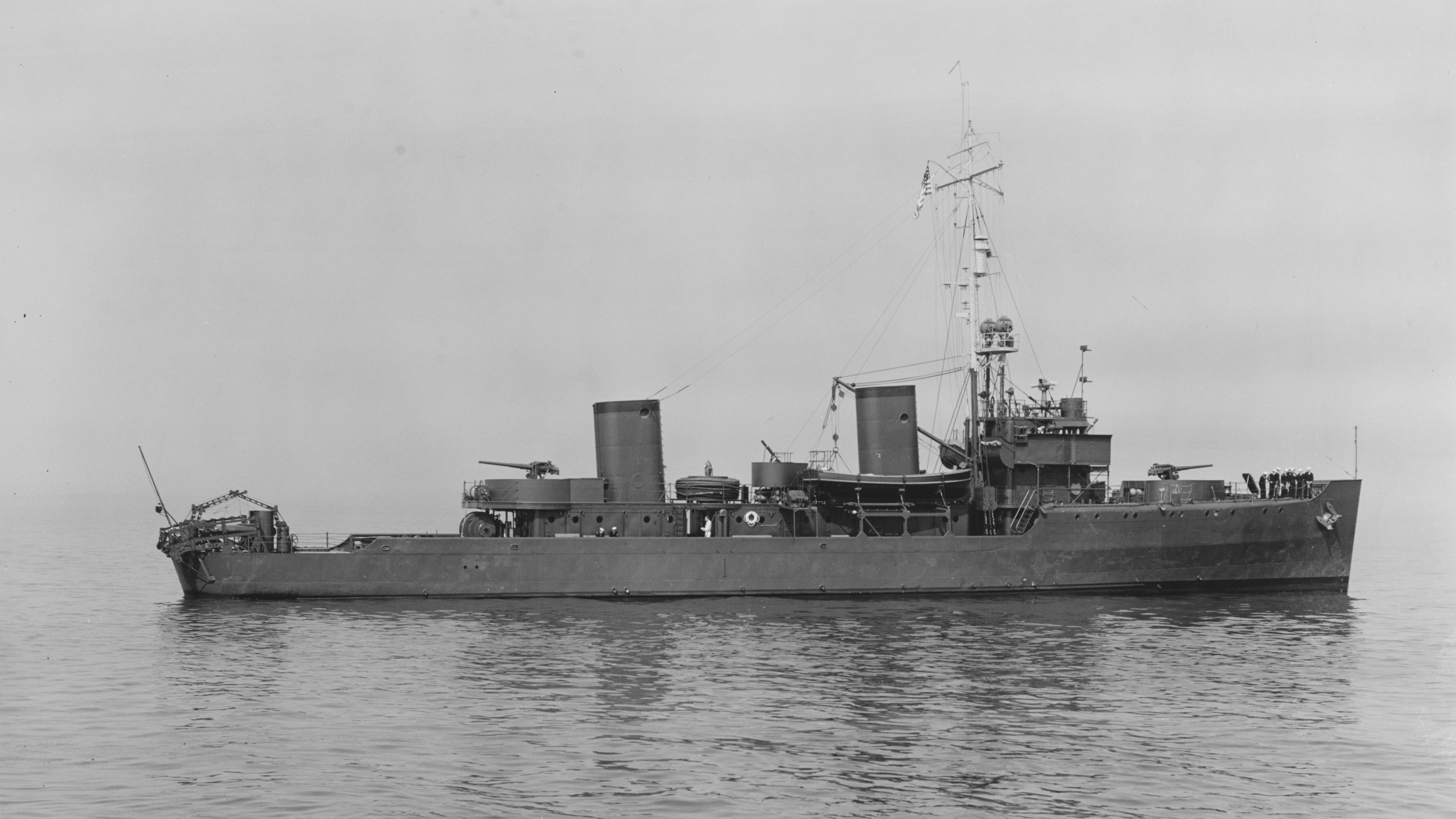
- USS Osprey in 1941

Class overview
- Name: Raven class
- Builders: Norfolk Navy Yard
- Operators: United States Navy
- Preceded by: Lapwing class
- Succeeded by: Auk class
- In commission: 11 November 1940 – 31 May 1946
- Completed: 2
- Lost: 1
- Retired: 1

General characteristics
- Type: Minesweeper
- Displacement: 810 tons; 1,040 tons full load
- Length: 220 ft 6 in (67.21 m)
- Beam: 32 ft 2 in (9.80 m)
- Draft: 9 ft 4 in (2.84 m)
- Speed: 18 knots (33 km/h)
- Complement: 105 officers and men
- Armament: Raven: 1 × 3-inch/50 caliber gun; 2 × 40 mm AA guns; Osprey: 2 × 3-inch/50 caliber guns

The Raven class was a class of two World War II-era U.S. Navy minesweepers. They were succeeded by the Auk class which were based on the Ravens but had diesel-electric rather than diesel propulsion.

== Ships ==
Ship name	Hull number	Date removed from Naval Vessel Register	Fate
USS Raven	AM-55	1 May 1967	Sunk as a target off the coast of southern California, 1967
USS Osprey	AM-56	22 August 1944	Struck a mine and sank, 5 June 1944
