= Raven, Gostivar =

Raven
- Village
- Равен
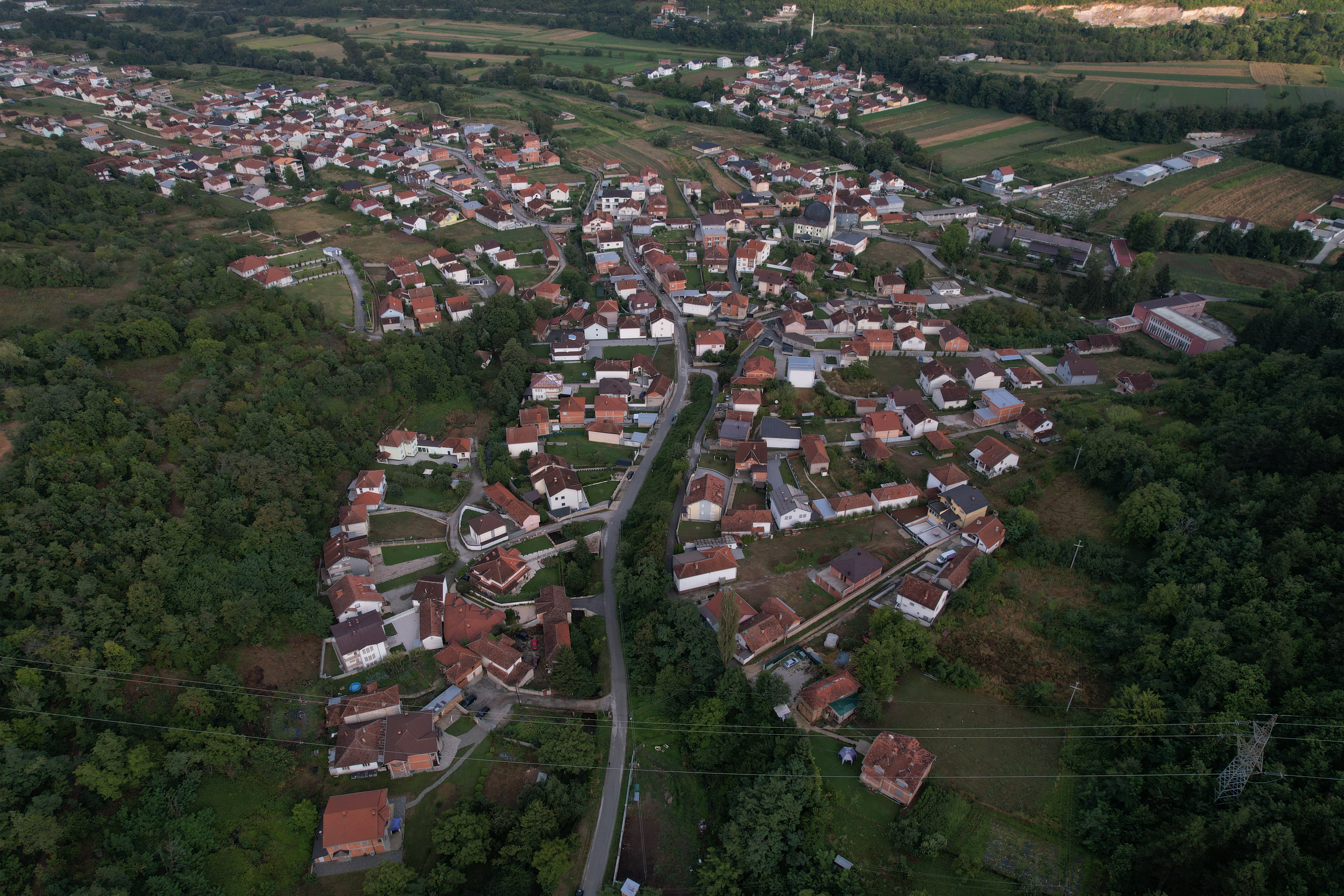
- Airview of the village

- Location within North Macedonia
- Coordinates: 41°47′N 20°51′E
- Country: North Macedonia
- Region: Polog
- Municipality: Gostivar

Population (2021)
  - Total: 1,116
- Time zone: UTC+1 (CET)
  - Summer (DST): UTC+2 (CEST)
- Car plates: GV
- Website: .

Raven (Macedonian: Равен, Albanian: Raven) is a village in the municipality of Gostivar, North Macedonia.

== History ==
Raven is attested in the 1467/68 Ottoman tax registry (defter) for the Nahiyah of Kalkandelen. The village had a total of 32 Christian households, 2 widows and 2 bachelors.

== Demographics ==
As of the 2021 census, Raven had 1,116 residents with the following ethnic composition:

- Albanians 1,077
- Persons for whom data are taken from administrative sources 33
- Macedonians 2
- Others 4

According to the 2002 census, the village had a total of 1615 inhabitants. Ethnic groups in the village include:

- Albanians 1611
- Macedonians 2
- Serbs 1
- Others 1

According to the 1942 Albanian census, Raven was inhabited by 726 Muslim Albanians.
