= Charlotte Zeepvat =

Historian and author

- Occupations: Historian and author
- Years active: 1991–present
- Known for: Royalty Digest; Prince Leopold: The Untold Story of Queen Victoria's Youngest Son

Academic background
- Education: Master of Arts
- Alma mater: University of Birmingham
- Thesis: Art collecting and artistic patronage in early Stuart England, with particular reference to the function of the ambassador (1976)
- Academic advisor: Eric Ives

Academic work
- Discipline: Royal history Royal photography
- Website: www.charlotte-zeepvat.co.uk

Charlotte M. Zeepvat is an author and historian of European royal history. She has written five books published by Sutton Publishing, including biographies of Prince Leopold, Duke of Albany and the Romanov family. An avid collector of original historical photographs, Zeepvat has also produced two collections of royal photographs, one about Queen Victoria and the other about the Romanovs.

Zeepvat was the primary contributor to the monthly journal Royalty Digest from 1991 to 2005, and contributes to its successor Royalty Digest Quarterly. She also has written for The Independent.

== Early life and education ==
Zeepvat read medieval and modern history at the University of Birmingham, graduating with a Master of Arts degree. Her senior thesis, completed in 1973 under the supervision of Eric Ives with the title "Patrons and collectors in early Stuart England", was released in 1976 entitled "Art collecting and artistic patronage in early Stuart England, with particular reference to the function of the ambassador." Zeepvat's first piece of independent research focused on World War I poet W. N. Hodgson, which she hoped would lead to publication; to help with finances, she painted miniature portraits, which rapidly expanded with orders from around the world.

== Writing career ==
Zeepvat started her professional writing career in 1991, when she became the principal contributor to the new monthly journal Royalty Digest, which focused on European royalty in the nineteenth and twentieth centuries. As Zeepvat describes, the invitation to write for the journal resulted from a "chance meeting" and she accepted, believing the job was "an intriguing prospect and an entry to the world of publication". She would contribute to Royalty Digest for the following fourteen years, until its closure in 2005; Zeepvat later began writing for its successor Royalty Digest Quarterly.

...A poignant small masterpiece, a book that constitutes an illuminating entré into the multifaceted Victorian world.

— Walter L. Arnstein in his review of Prince Leopold: The Untold Story of Queen Victoria's Youngest Son

Working for the journal led to her entry into book publications. For Zeepvat's first book, Prince Leopold: The Untold Story of Queen Victoria's Youngest Son, which was published in 1998, she was granted access to the Royal Archives. Zeepvat has referred to the haemophiliac subject, Prince Leopold, Duke of Albany, as a "biographer's dream – an [sic] neglected subject whose voice still spoke through an extensive and almost untapped correspondence." Of the book, historian Walter L. Arnstein wrote, "A biography of Queen Victoria's eighth child... may not, at first glance, impress readers as a particularly helpful introduction to the broader cultural world of Victorian Britain, but, to a surprising degree, it is just that. Charlotte Zeepvat may not be affiliated with an academic institution, but she is an accomplished historian who carefully documents every quotation and generalization. She also demonstrates how many nuggets may be uncovered in the vast correspondence... of a letter-writing generation."

In 2000, Sutton Publishing released Zeepvat's Romanov Autumn: The Last Century of Imperial Russia, which detailed the final hundred years of the Romanov Imperial family in power. The Irish Times' Mary Morrissy called the work "populist history", referring to Zeepvat work as a tour guide in Moscow. Morrissy remarked, "Each chapter is accompanied by the author's pen-and-ink sketches, which, along with Zeepvat's rather breathy writing style, lends the book an old-fashioned air. Rather like leafing through a Victorian lady's scrapbook." More critical, Booklist's Jay Freeman noted that "while serious historians will find little of value here, royalty junkies can have a field day."

A collector of original historical photographs, over the next few years Zeepvat compiled and wrote two photographic books, one of Queen Victoria's family and another of the Romanovs.

The Contemporary Review noted of Zeepvat's 2006 work From Cradle to Crown: British Nannies and Governesses at the World's Royal Courts, "By the extensive use of manuscript collections, official records and published memoirs Miss Zeepvat has uncovered a now vanished world and answers these questions. The nannies' world was 'infinitely more human and more subtle' than merely an example of British power abroad. Given the variety of backgrounds described, this fascinating book is also 'a kaleidoscope of women's lives' and an insight into the history of childhood."

Zeepvat has also contributed articles to The Independent.

== Works ==
- Prince Leopold: The Untold Story of Queen Victoria's Youngest Son (1998)
- Romanov Autumn: The Last Century of Imperial Russia (2000)
- Queen Victoria's Family: A Century of Photographs 1840-1940 (2001)
- The Camera and the Tsars: A Romanov Family Album (2004)
- From Cradle to Crown: British Nannies and Governesses at the World's Royal Courts (2006)
