= Raven, Nebraska =

- Unincorporated community
- Location within Nebraska Location within the United States
- Coordinates: 42°16′32″N 99°51′57″W
- Country: United States
- State: Nebraska
- County: Brown
- Time zone: UTC-6 (Central (CST))
  - Summer (DST): UTC-5 (CDT)
- Area code: 402
- GNIS feature ID: 1844907

Raven is an unincorporated community in Brown County, Nebraska, United States.

== History ==
A post office was established at Raven in 1906, and remained in operation until it was discontinued in 1922.
