= Prince William of Baden (1829–1897) =

Prussian general and politician

Prince William
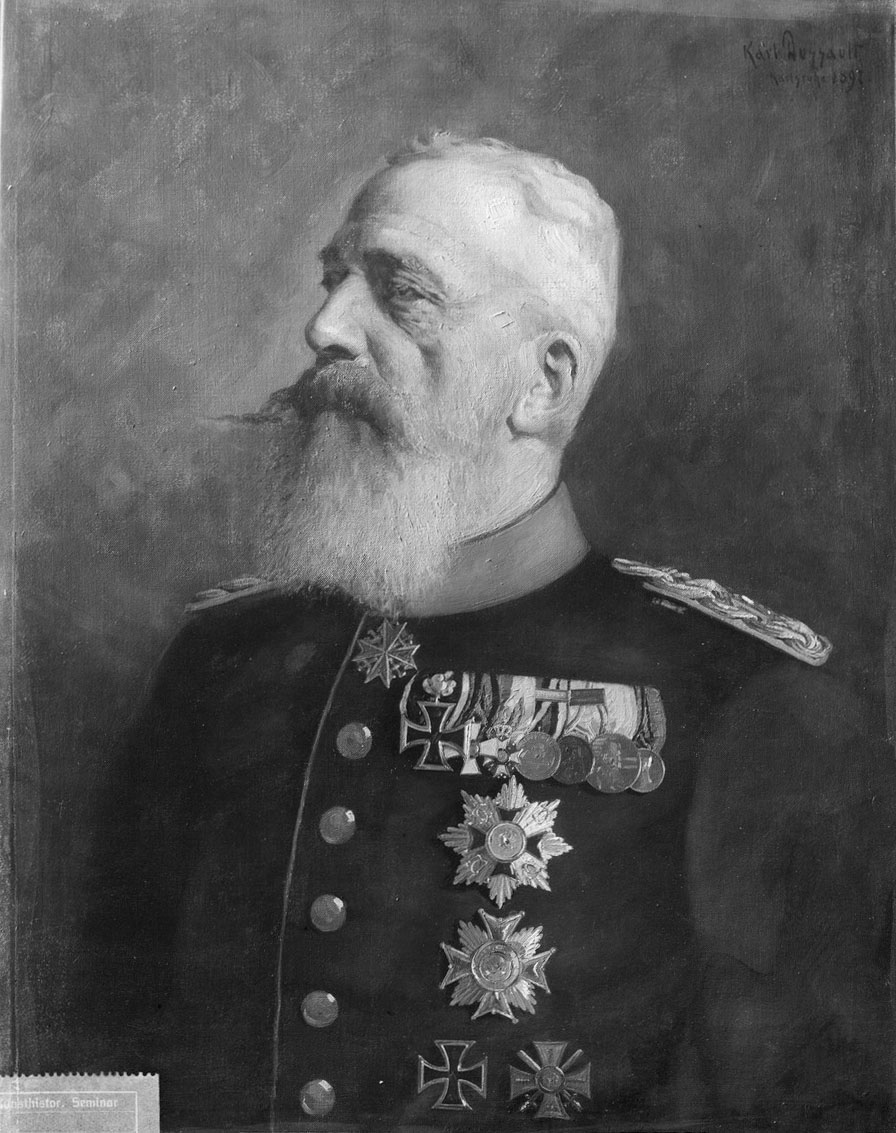
- Portrait, 1897
- Born: 18 December 1829; Karlsruhe, Grand Duchy of Baden
- Died: 27 April 1897 (aged 67); Karlsruhe, Grand Duchy of Baden
- Burial: Grand Ducal Crypt Chapel, Fasanengarten, Karlsruhe, Baden-Württemberg
- Spouse: Princess Maria Maximilianovna of Leuchtenberg (m. 1863)
- Issue: Marie, Duchess of Anhalt; Prince Maximilian
Names
- Louis William Augustus; German: Ludwig Wilhelm August
- House: Zähringen
- Father: Leopold, Grand Duke of Baden
- Mother: Princess Sophie of Sweden

Prince Louis William Augustus of Baden (German: Ludwig Wilhelm August Prinz von Baden; 18 December 1829 – 27 April 1897) was a Prussian general and politician. He was the father of Prince Maximilian of Baden, the last Minister President of the Kingdom of Prussia and last Chancellor of the German Empire. Wilhelm was a Prince of Baden, and a member of the House of Zähringen.

== Family ==
Wilhelm was born in Karlsruhe, Grand Duchy of Baden, on 18 December 1829 as the fifth child and third surviving son of Leopold, Grand Duke of Baden, and his wife Princess Sophie of Sweden. Through his father, Wilhelm was a grandson of Charles Frederick, Grand Duke of Baden and his wife Baroness Louise Caroline Geyer of Geyersberg and through his mother, a grandson of Gustav IV Adolf of Sweden and his wife Frederica of Baden.

Wilhelm was a brother of Alexandrine, Duchess of Saxe-Coburg and Gotha; Louis II, Grand Duke of Baden; Frederick I, Grand Duke of Baden; Prince Charles of Baden; Princess Marie of Baden, Princess of Leiningen; and Grand Duchess Olga Feodorovna of Russia.

== Military career ==
During his brief service in the Baden Federal Contingent (German: Baden Bundescontingente), Wilhelm attained the rank of Lieutenant in 1847 and First Lieutenant in 1849. Beginning between 1849 and 1850, he served as a First Lieutenant in the 1st Foot Guards (German: 1. Garde-Regiment zu Fuß) infantry regiment of the Royal Prussian Army. Wilhelm received his formal education in the Prussian Army. From 1856, Wilhelm served as Major of the Guard Artillery (German: Gardeartillerie) and served as the last Major General and Commander of the Guards Artillery Brigade (German: Gardeartilleriebrigade). Wilhelm retired from Prussian military service in 1863 with the rank of Lieutenant General, shortly before his marriage to Princess Maria of Leuchtenberg.

=== Austro-Prussian War ===
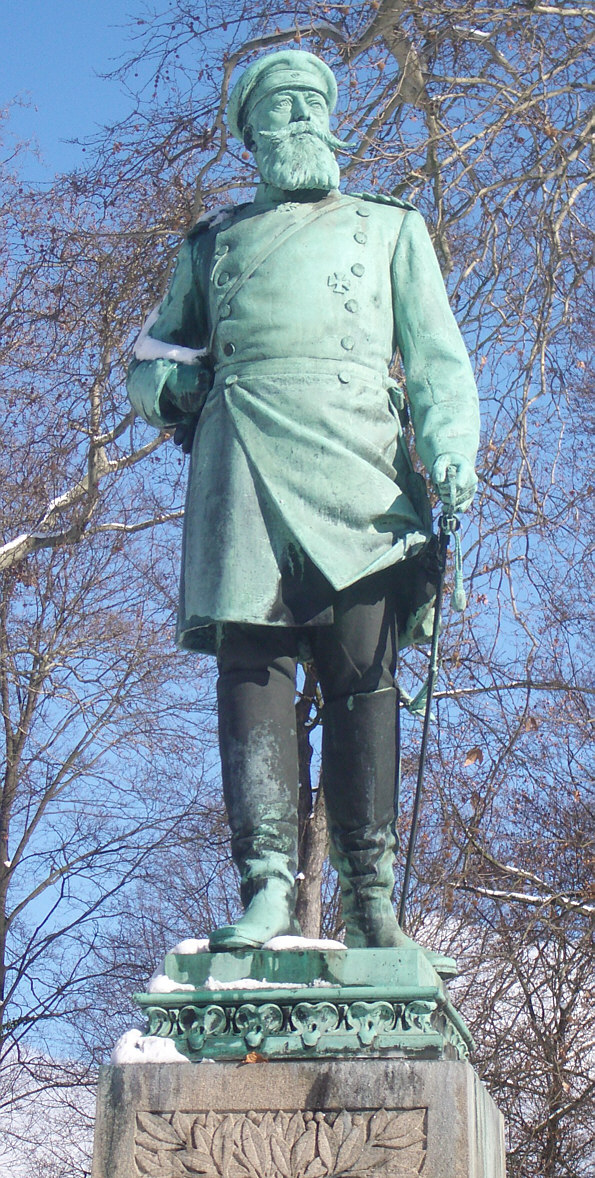
Monument to Prince Wilhelm in Karlsruhe, sculpted by Hermann Volz.

In 1866, during the Austro-Prussian War between the Kingdom of Prussia and the Austrian Empire, Wilhelm assumed command of the Baden Division of the 8th Federal Corps (German: 8. Bundeskorps) siding with the Austrian-led German Confederation. The dissolution of the 8th Federal Corps began on 30 July 1866 when Wilhelm sent a flag of truce along with a letter to the Prussian headquarters at Marktheidenfeld. The letter stated that Wilhelm's father Leopold, Grand Duke of Baden, had entered into direct negotiations with Wilhelm I of Prussia and that King Wilhelm I granted the Baden troops permission to return to their homes.

Immediately following the Austro-Prussian War, Wilhelm reformed the army of Baden based upon the Prussian system. Wilhelm and Prince August of Württemberg were the two south German princes who were foremost in securing the union of the Northern and Southern German states. On 22 September 1868, Wilhelm announced his resignation from the command of the troops of the Grand Duchy of Baden and was replaced by General Beza.

=== Franco-Prussian War ===
In the Franco-Prussian War of 1870–71, Wilhelm commanded the 1st Baden Brigade in the XIV Corps. On 30 October 1870, Wilhelm and General Gustav Friedrich von Beyer assailed Dijon. The French had transported 10,000 men by rail and the citizens of Dijon, including women, joined in the defense of the city against the Germans. The resistance was not easily subdued and the Germans suffered heavy losses, however according to historian Gustave Louis Maurice Strauss, "[Wilhelm] carried the heights of St. Apollinari in gallant style and occupied the suburbs from which the Germans ultimately forced their way into the city where fierce fights from barricade to barricade from house to house lasted till midnight." Dijon was occupied by 24,000 Prussians on 18 January 1870, but was reoccupied by the French after a severe battle, and subsequently retaken by the Prussians on 19 January, during which Wilhelm was shot in his cheek at Nuits-Saint-Georges.

=== Post-war career ===
In 1895, Kaiser Wilhelm II promoted him à la suite to the Grenadier Regiment (German: Leibgrenadierregimentes) in honor of the 25th anniversary of the Battle of Nuits-Saint-Georges. At the same time, Wilhelm II made him knight of the Order of Pour le Mérite, the Kingdom of Prussia's highest military order.

Wilhelm's final military rank was General of the Infantry.

== Political career ==
From a young age, Wilhelm held a seat in the First Chamber of the Diet of the Grand Duchy of Baden. From 1871 to 1873, Wilhelm was a representative of Baden in the Reichstag of the German Empire in which he was a member of the German Imperial Party (German: Deutsche Reichspartei) (also known as the Free Conservative Party).

== Marriage and children ==
Wilhelm married Princess Maria Maximilianovna of Leuchtenberg, Princess Romanovskaja on 11 February 1863 in Saint Petersburg. She was the eldest surviving daughter of Maximilian de Beauharnais, 3rd Duke of Leuchtenberg and his wife Grand Duchess Maria Nikolaevna of Russia, Russian Empire. Upon learning of the marriage, United States President Abraham Lincoln sent a letter to Wilhelm's elder brother Frederick I, Grand Duke of Baden in which Lincoln stated: "I participate in the satisfaction afforded by this happy event and pray Your Royal Highness to accept my sincere congratulations upon the occasion together with the assurances of my highest consideration." Prior to the marriage, Wilhelm had traveled to England as a potential suitor of Princess Mary Adelaide of Cambridge.

Wilhelm and Maria had two children:

- Princess Marie of Baden (26 July 1865 – 29 November 1939), later Duchess of Anhalt as the wife of Friedrich II, Duke of Anhalt (no issue)
- Prince Maximilian of Baden (10 July 1867 – 6 November 1929)

== Candidate for the Greek throne ==
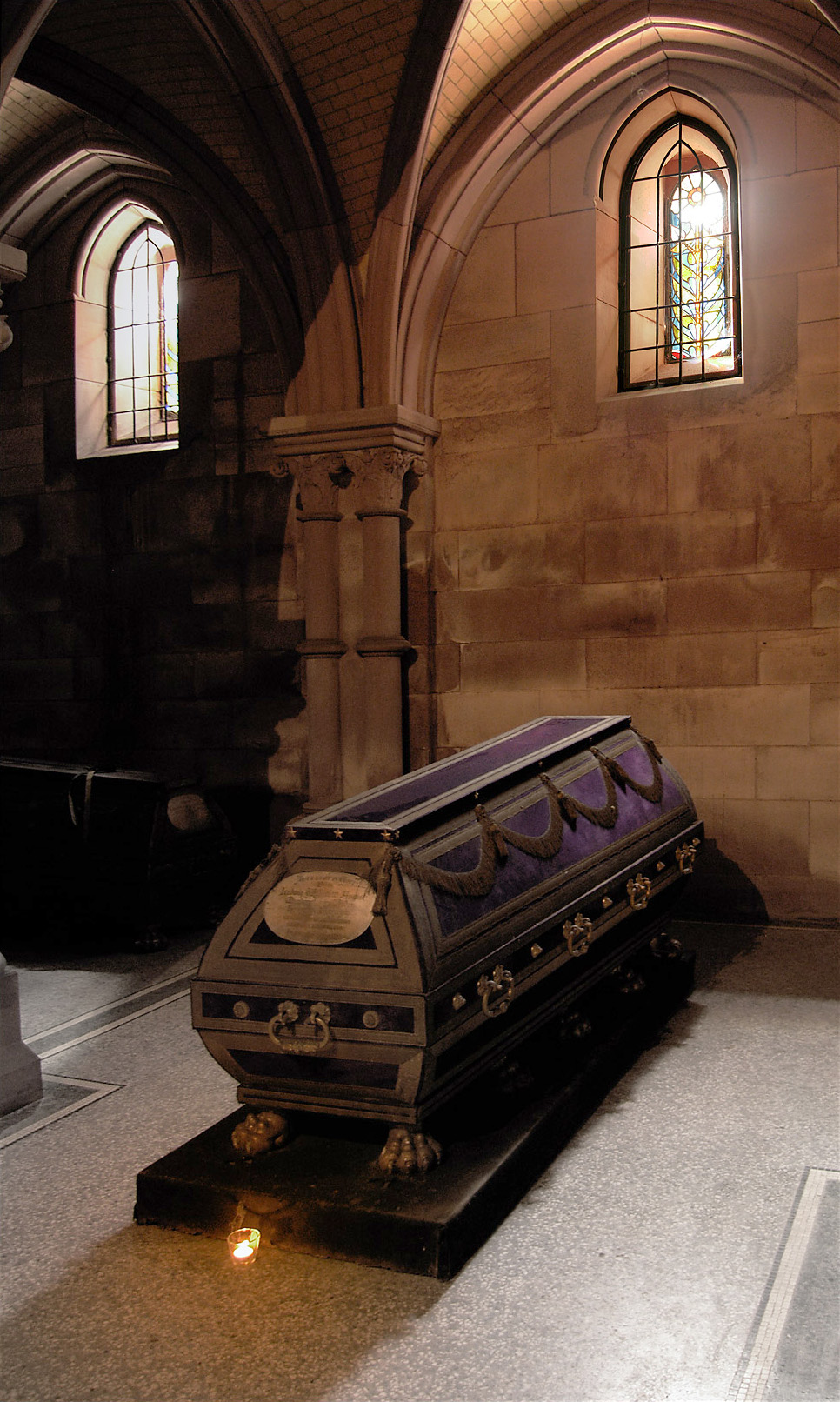
The tomb of Prince Wilhelm of Baden in the Grand Ducal Crypt Chapel in Karlsruhe.

Following the deposition of Otto of Greece and the Greek head of state referendum of 1862, Wilhelm was considered by Wilhelm I of Prussia and Otto von Bismarck as a candidate for the throne of the Kingdom of Greece. The Russian Empire's preferred candidate for the Greek throne fluctuated between Nicholas Maximilianovitch, 4th Duke of Leuchtenberg and Wilhelm, his brother-in-law. As a potential candidate, Wilhelm demanded no renunciations of rights to the Greek throne from King Otto's family in the Kingdom of Bavaria. According to The New York Times on 16 March 1863, then recent purchases of Greek bonds in London were the result of a report that Wilhelm was to be formally recommended for the throne.

== Later life ==
Wilhelm was in attendance at the dedication of the monument to Martin Luther at Worms on 27 June 1868.

Following the death of his brother-in-law Ernest II, Duke of Saxe-Coburg and Gotha, Wilhelm traveled to Schloss Reinhardsbrunn on 23 August 1893 to visit his widowed sister Alexandrine and greet the Duke's successor, Prince Alfred, Duke of Edinburgh. He attended the Duke's funeral procession and service in Coburg on 28 August 1893.

Wilhelm died in Karlsruhe on 27 April 1897 at the age of 67. He was interred at the Grand Ducal Crypt Chapel (German: Großherzogliche Grabkapelle) in the Fasanengarten in Karlsruhe.

== Honours ==
National honours

- Baden:
  - Knight of the House Order of Fidelity
  - Grand Cross of the Military Karl-Friedrich Merit Order
  - Knight of the Order of Berthold the First
  - Grand Cross of the Zähringer Lion, with Swords
- Anhalt: Grand Cross of Albert the Bear, 1889
- (Saxe-Coburg and Gotha) (Duchy of Saxe-Altenburg) (Saxe-Meiningen) Ernestine duchies: Grand Cross of the Saxe-Ernestine House Order
- (Grand Duchy of Hesse) Hesse and by Rhine: Grand Cross of the Ludwig Order, 18 December 1848
- Mecklenburg: Grand Cross of the Wendish Crown, with Crown in Ore
- Nassau: Knight of the Gold Lion of Nassau
- Oldenburg: Grand Cross of the Order of Duke Peter Friedrich Ludwig, with Golden Crown, 17 April 1859
- Saxe-Weimar-Eisenach: Grand Cross of the White Falcon, 9 December 1865
- Saxony: Knight of the Rue Crown, 1860
- Württemberg: Grand Cross of the Württemberg Crown, 1864
- Kingdom of Prussia:
  - Knight of the Black Eagle, 20 September 1856; with Collar, 1857
  - Knight of the Red Eagle, 1st Class, 20 September 1856; with Swords, 1861
  - Iron Cross (1870), 2nd and 1st Classes
  - Pour le Mérite (military), 18 December 1895
  - War Commemorative Medal of 1870/71

Foreign honours

- Austrian Empire: Grand Cross of the Imperial Order of Leopold, 1852
- Belgium: Grand Cordon of the Order of Leopold
- French Empire: Grand Cross of the Legion of Honour, June 1860
- Kingdom of Italy: Knight of the Annunciation
- Principality of Montenegro: Grand Cross of the Order of Prince Danilo I
- Russian Empire:
  - Knight of St. Andrew
  - Knight of St. Alexander Nevsky
  - Knight of St. Anna, 1st Class
  - Knight of St. George, 4th Class

== Ancestry ==
Ancestors of Prince William of Baden (1829–1897)

8. Frederick, Hereditary Prince of Baden-Durlach
4. Charles Frederick, Grand Duke of Baden
9. Princess Amalia of Nassau-Dietz
2. Leopold, Grand Duke of Baden
10. Ludwig Heinrich, Baron Geyer of Geyersberg
5. Baroness Louise Karoline Geyer of Geyersberg
11. Countess Maximiliana Christiane of Sponeck
1. Prince Wilhelm of Baden
12. Gustav III of Sweden
6. Gustav IV Adolf of Sweden
13. Sophia Magdalena of Denmark
3. Princess Sophie of Sweden
14. Charles Louis, Hereditary Prince of Baden
7. Frederica of Baden
15. Landgravine Amalie of Hesse-Darmstadt
