= Princess Marie of Baden, Duchess of Anhalt =

Duchess of Anhalt from 1904 to 1918

Marie of Baden
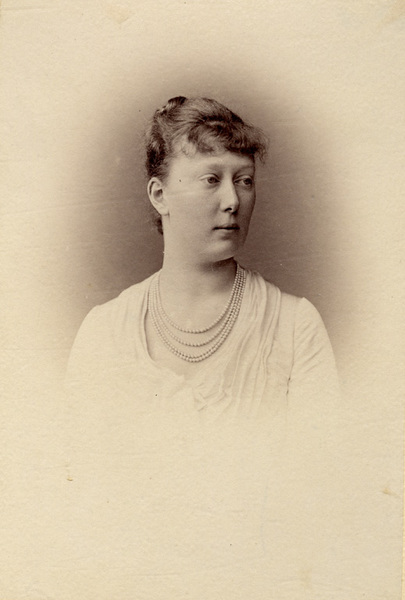
- Princess Marie in 1896

Duchess of Anhalt
- Tenure: 24 January 1904 – 21 April 1918
- Born: 26 July 1865; Baden-Baden, Grand Duchy of Baden
- Died: 29 November 1939 (aged 74); Baden-Baden, Nazi Germany
- Spouse: Friedrich II, Duke of Anhalt (m. 1889; died 1918)
Names
- Sophie Marie Luise Amelie Josephine
- House: Zähringen
- Father: Prince William of Baden
- Mother: Princess Maria Maximilianovna of Leuchtenberg

Marie, Duchess of Anhalt (née Princess Sophie Marie of Baden; 26 July 1865 – 29 November 1939) was the wife and consort of Friedrich II, Duke of Anhalt. She was the last Duchess of Anhalt as German royal and noble titles were abolished in 1919 during the Weimar Republic.

== Biography ==
Princess Sophie Marie Luise Amelie Josephine of Baden was born on 26 July 1865 to Prince William of Baden and Princess Maria Maximilianovna of Leuchtenberg. Her paternal grandparents were Leopold, Grand Duke of Baden and Princess Sophie of Sweden. Her maternal grandparents were Maximilian de Beauharnais, 3rd Duke of Leuchtenberg and Grand Duchess Maria Nikolaevna of Russia. She was a great-granddaughter of both Gustav IV Adolf of Sweden and Nicholas I of Russia. Marie was a sister of Prince Maximilian of Baden, Chancellor of the German Empire.

On 2 July 1889, she married Friedrich, Hereditary Prince of Anhalt, in Karlsruhe. The marriage was childless. In 1904, her husband ascended the throne as the Duke of Anhalt. Her husband died in 1918. She died on 29 November 1939 in Baden-Baden.

== Ancestry ==
Ancestors of Princess Marie of Baden, Duchess of Anhalt

8. Charles Frederick, Grand Duke of Baden
4. Leopold, Grand Duke of Baden
9. Louise Caroline Geyer von Geyersberg
2. Prince William of Baden
10. Gustav IV Adolf of Sweden
5. Princess Sophie of Sweden
11. Princess Frederica of Baden
1. Princess Marie of Baden
12. Eugène de Beauharnais, Duke of Leuchtenberg
6. Maximilian de Beauharnais, Duke of Leuchtenberg
13. Princess Augusta of Bavaria
3. Princess Maria Maximilianovna of Leuchtenberg
14. Nicholas I of Russia
7. Grand Duchess Maria Nikolaevna of Russia
15. Princess Charlotte of Prussia

Princess Marie of Baden, Duchess of Anhalt House of Baden Born: 26 July 1865 Died: 29 November 1939
Regnal titles
Preceded by Princess Antoinette of Saxe-Altenburg	Duchess consort of Anhalt; 24 January 1904 – 21 April 1918	Monarchy abolished German Revolution
