= Leopold, Grand Duke of Baden =

Grand Duke of Baden from 1830 to 1852

Leopold
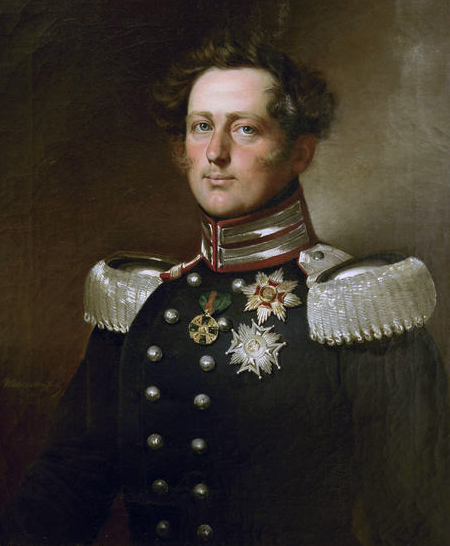
- Portrait by Franz Xaver Winterhalter (1831)

Grand Duke of Baden
- Reign: 30 March 1830 – 24 April 1852
- Predecessor: Louis I
- Successor: Louis II
- Born: Count Leopold von Hochberg; 29 August 1790; Karlsruhe Palace, Karlsruhe, Margraviate of Baden, Holy Roman Empire
- Died: 24 April 1852 (aged 61); Karlsruhe Palace, Karlsruhe, Grand Duchy of Baden, German Confederation
- Spouse: Princess Sophie of Sweden (m. 1819)
- Issue Detail: Alexandrine, Duchess of Saxe-Coburg and Gotha; Prince Louis; Louis II, Grand Duke of Baden; Frederick I, Grand Duke of Baden; Prince William; Prince Karl; Marie, Princess of Leiningen; Cecile Auguste, Grand Duchess Olga Feodorovna of Russia
- House: Zähringen
- Father: Charles Frederick, Grand Duke of Baden
- Mother: Louise Caroline of Hochberg
- Religion: Lutheranism

Leopold (29 August 1790 – 24 April 1852) succeeded in 1830 as the Grand Duke of Baden, reigning until his death in 1852.

Although a younger child, Leopold was the first son of Margrave Karl Friederich of Baden by his second, morganatic wife, Louise Karoline Geyer von Geyersberg. Since Luise Karoline was not of equal birth with the Margrave, the marriage was deemed morganatic and the resulting children were perceived as incapable of inheriting their father's dynastic status or the sovereign rights of the Zähringen House of Baden. Luise Karoline and her children were given the titles of baron and baroness, in 1796 count or countess von Hochberg.

Baden gained territory during the Napoleonic Wars. As a result, Margrave Karl Friederich was elevated to the title of Prince-Elector within the Holy Roman Empire. With the dissolution of the Holy Roman Empire in 1806, he took the title Grand Duke of Baden.

== Hochberg heir ==
Since the descendants of Charles Frederick's first marriage to Karoline Louise of Hesse-Darmstadt were at first plentiful, no one expected the Hochberg children of his second wife to be anything except a family of counts with blood ties to the grand ducal family, but lacking dynastic rights. Count Leopold von Hochberg was born in Karlsruhe, and with no prospects of advancement in Baden, followed a career as an officer in the French army.

The situation of both the grand duchy and the Hochberg children became objects of international interest as it became apparent that the Baden male line descended from Karl Frederick's first wife was likely to die out. One by one, the males of the House of Baden expired without leaving male descendants. By 1817, there were only two males left, the reigning Grand Duke Charles I, a grandson of Charles Frederick's, and his childless uncle Prince Louis. Both of Charles's sons died in infancy. Baden's dynasty seemed to face extinction, casting the country's future in doubt.

Unbeknownst to those outside of the court at Baden, upon the 24 November 1787 wedding of then-Margrave Charles Frederick to Luise Karoline Geyer von Geyersberg, he and the three sons of his first marriage signed a declaration which reserved decision on the title and any succession rights of sons to be born of the marriage. Although Luise Karoline's children were not initially legally recognised as of dynastic rank, on 20 February 1796 their father clarified in writing (subsequently co-signed by his elder sons) that the couple's sons were eligible to succeed to the margravial throne in order of male primogeniture after extinction of the male issue of his first marriage. The Margrave further declared that his marriage to their mother must "in no way be seen as morganatic, but rather as a true equal marriage".

On 10 September 1806, after the abolition of the Holy Roman Empire and the assumption of full sovereignty, Charles Frederick confirmed the dynastic status of the sons of his second marriage. This act was, yet again, signed by his three eldest sons, but was not promulgated.

On 4 October 1817, as neither Grand Duke Charles nor the other sons from his grandfather's first marriage had surviving male descendants, Charles proceeded to confirm the succession rights of his hither-to morganatic half-uncles, elevating each to the title Prince and Margrave of Baden, and the style of Highness. He asked the princely congress in Aachen on 20 November 1818, just weeks before his death, to confirm the succession rights of these sons of his step-grandmother, still known as Countess Luise von Hochberg.

But this proclamation of Baden's succession evoked international challenges. The Congress of Vienna had, in 1815, recognised the claims of Bavaria and Austria to parts of Baden which it allocated to Charles Frederick in the Upper Palatinate and the Breisgau, anticipating that upon his imminent demise those lands would cease to be part of the Grand Duchy. Moreover, the Wittelsbach king of Bavaria, Maximilian I Joseph, was married to Grand Duke Charles's eldest sister, Caroline of Baden. The female most closely related to the last male of a German dynasty often inherited in such circumstances, in accordance with Semi-Salic succession law. As a result, Maximilian had a strong claim to Baden under the customary rules of inheritance, as well as his claims under a post–Congress of Vienna treaty of 16 April 1816.

Nonetheless, in 1818 Charles granted a constitution to the nation, the liberality of which made it popular with the people of Baden and which included a clause securing the succession rights of the offspring of Luise Karoline Geyer von Geyersberg. Another dispute was resolved by Baden's agreement to cede a portion of the county of Wertheim, already enclaved within Bavaria, to that kingdom.

To further improve the status of Prince Leopold, his half-brother the new Grand Duke Louis I arranged for him to marry his great-niece, Sophie, daughter of former King Gustav IV Adolf of Sweden by Grand Duke Charles's sister, Frederica. Since Sophie was a granddaughter of Leopold's oldest half-brother, Charles Louis, this marriage united the descendants of his father's (Grand Duke Charles Frederick's) two wives. Sophie's undoubted royal blood would help to offset the stigma of Leopold's morganatic birth.

Finally, on 10 July 1819, a few months after Charles's death, the Great Powers of Austria, France, Great Britain, Prussia and Russia joined with Bavaria and Baden in the 1819 Treaty of Frankfurt which recognized the succession rights of the former Hochberg morganatic line.

When Louis I died on 30 March 1830, he was the last male of the House of Baden not descended from the morganatic marriage of Charles Frederick and Luise Karoline Geyer von Geyersberg. Leopold von Hochberg now succeeded as the fourth Grand Duke of Baden.

== Reign ==
Leopold was interested in the liberal ideas of his time, granted concessions to his subjects in 1848, and in the spring of 1849 declined to oppose the movement (see Revolutions of 1848 in the German states) which finally broke down all barriers and forced him to flee from the country on the night of 13 May. In August, he was reinstated by the troops of Prussia and the German Confederation. He acted with the greatest forbearance after regaining his power. During the last years of his reign, he admitted his son Frederick, who later succeeded him, to a share in the government. He died in Karlsruhe.

== Marriage and issue ==
On 25 July 1819, Leopold married in Karlsruhe his half-grand-niece Sophie of Sweden (21 May 1801 – 6 July 1865). Sophia and Leopold had the following children:

- Princess Alexandrine of Baden (6 December 1820 – 20 December 1904) she married Ernest II, Duke of Saxe-Coburg and Gotha on 13 May 1842. They had no children.
- Prince Louis of Baden (1822–1822).
- Louis II, Grand Duke of Baden (15 August 1824 – 22 January 1858). Louis suffered from mental illness and as a result, his brother Prince Frederick acted as Regent.
- Frederick I, Grand Duke of Baden (9 September 1826 – 28 September 1907) he married Princess Louise of Prussia on 20 September 1856. They had three children: Frederick II, Grand Duke of Baden (9 July 1857 – 9 August 1928); Princess Victoria of Baden, later Queen of Sweden (7 August 1862 – 4 April 1930); and Prince Louis of Baden (12 June 1865 - 23 February 1888).
- Prince Wilhelm of Baden (18 December 1829 – 27 April 1897) he married Princess Maria Maximilianovna of Leuchtenberg on 11 February 1863. They had two children: Princess Marie of Baden, Duchess of Anhalt (26 July 1865 – 29 Nov 1939) and Prince Max of Baden (1867–1929), German Chancellor, and later the heir to the Grand Duchy.
- Prince Charles (Karl) of Baden (9 March 1832 – 3 December 1906) he married morganatically Baroness Rosalie von Beust (created Countess von Rhena) on 17 May 1871. They had one son, Count Frederick von Rhena (1877–1908).
- Princess Marie of Baden (20 November 1834 – 21 November 1899) she married Ernst Leopold, 4th Prince of Leiningen on 11 September 1858. They had two children: Princess Alberta of Leiningen (23 July 1863 – 30 August 1901); and Emich, 5th Prince of Leiningen (18 January 1866 – 18 July 1939).
- Princess Cecilie of Baden (20 September 1839 – 12 April 1891) she married Grand Duke Michael Nicolaievich of Russia on 28 August 1857. They had seven children.

== Titulature ==
The title and rank of Leopold and the other children of Grand Duke Charles Frederick by his second, morganatic wife, Luise Karoline Geyer von Geyersberg was initially ambiguous as stipulated in his parents' marriage contract (co-signed by his dynastic half-brothers at their father's behest), the daughters at least bearing their mother's (inaccurately attributed) baronial title, while only legally acquiring the title of Reichsgraf von Hochberg from 1796 when she was granted that rank by the Holy Roman Emperor. Leopold and his full siblings were not officially elevated to the title of margrave until 1817 when they were publicly de-morganitised. But their father had, in fact, allowed its use for his morganatic children at his own court in Karlsruhe at least from his assumption of the grand ducal crown in 1806, simultaneously according the princely title to the dynastic sons of his first marriage. However, from 1817 his male-line descendants of both marriages were internationally recognised as entitled to the princely prefix, which all used henceforth.

The title of Margrave of Baden has been borne as a title of pretence by Leopold's senior-most descendant and heir, each as the head of the House of Zähringen, since the death of the last reigning Grand Duke, Frederick II, in 1928.

== Honours ==
- Knight of the House Order of Fidelity
- 1830: Grand Cross of the Order of St. Stephen
- 31 August 1843: Grand Cordon of the Order of Leopold

== Ancestry ==
Ancestors of Leopold, Grand Duke of Baden

8. Charles III William, Margrave of Baden-Durlach
4. Frederick, Hereditary Prince of Baden-Durlach
9. Duchess Magdalena Wilhelmine of Württemberg
2. Charles Frederick, Grand Duke of Baden
10. John William Friso, Prince of Orange
5. Princess Amalia of Nassau-Dietz
11. Landgravine Marie Louise of Hesse-Kassel
1. Leopold, Grand Duke of Baden
12. Christian Heinrich Geyer von Geyersberg
6. Ludwig Heinrich Geyer von Geyersberg
13. Christiane Philippa von Thümmel
3. Baroness Caroline Louise Geyer of Geyersberg
14. Johann Rudolph Hedwiger, Count von Sponeck
7. Countess Maximiliana Christiane von Sponeck
15. Baroness Wilhelmine Louise von Hoff

Leopold, Grand Duke of Baden House of Zähringen Born: 29 August 1790 Died: 24 April 1852
Regnal titles
Preceded by Louis I	Grand Duke of Baden; 1830–1852	Succeeded by Louis II
