= Princess Maria Maximilianovna of Leuchtenberg =

Princess Maria Maximilianova
- Princess Wilhelm of Baden
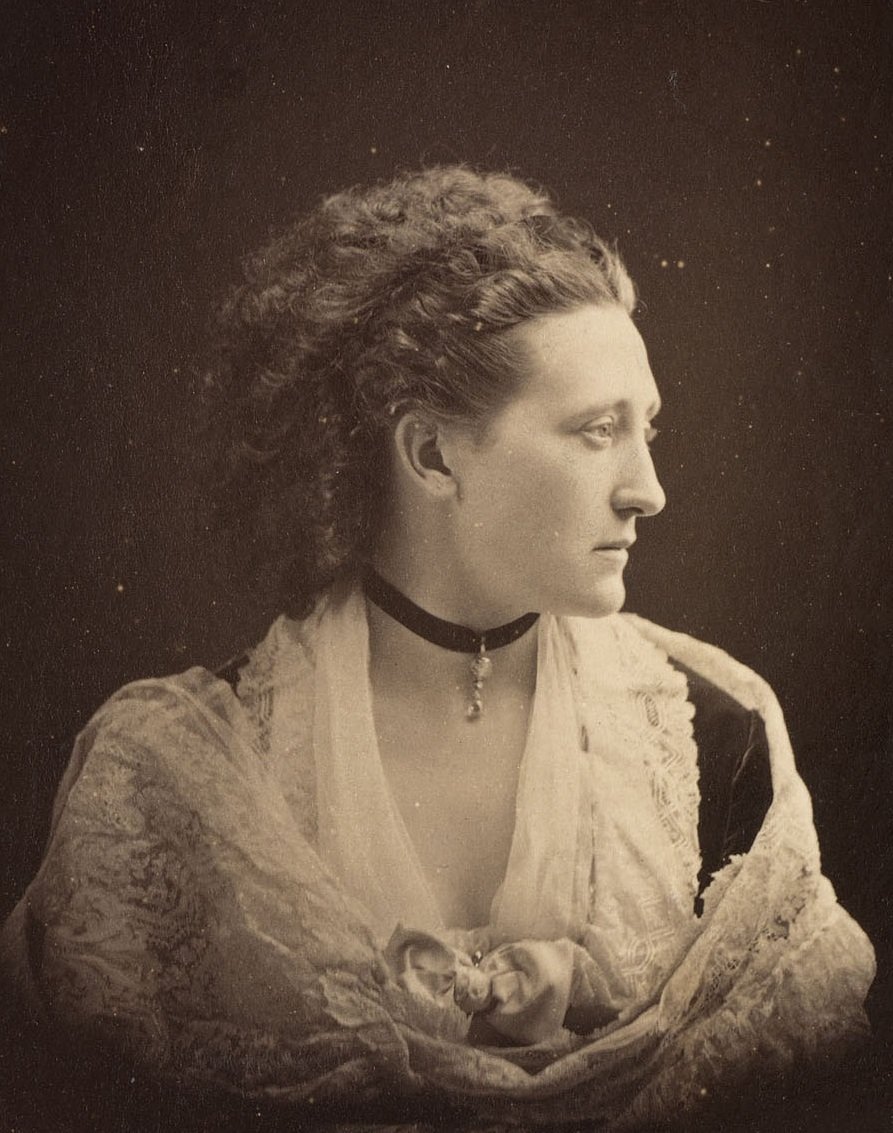
- Maria Maximilianovna in 1874
- Born: 16 October 1841; St. Petersburg, Russian Empire
- Died: 16 February 1914 (aged 72); St. Petersburg, Russian Empire
- Burial: Russische Kirche
- Spouse: Prince Wilhelm of Baden (m. 1863; died 1897)
- Issue: Marie, Duchess of Anhalt; Prince Maximilian of Baden
- House: Beauharnais
- Father: Maximilian de Beauharnais, 3rd Duke of Leuchtenberg
- Mother: Grand Duchess Maria Nikolaevna of Russia

Princess Maria Maximilianovna of Leuchtenberg, also known as Princess Maria Romanovskya, Maria, Princess Romanovskaja, Maria Herzogin von Leuchtenberg or Marie Maximiliane (16 October 1841 – 16 February 1914) was the eldest surviving daughter of Maximilian de Beauharnais, 3rd Duke of Leuchtenberg and Grand Duchess Maria Nikolaevna of Russia. She married Prince Wilhelm of Baden. The couple's son, Prince Maximilian, was Germany's last Imperial chancellor.

== Family and early life ==
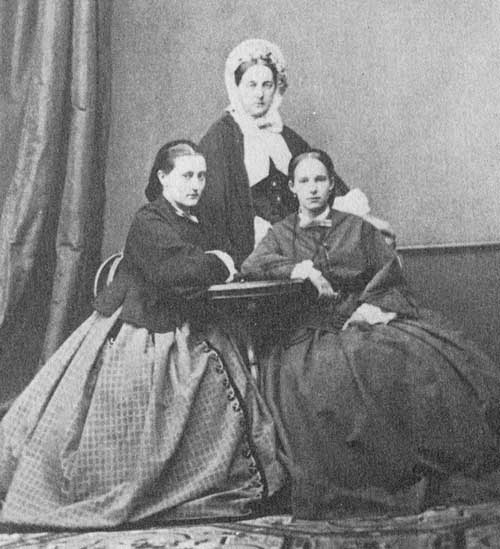
Princess Maria with her mother and sister Eugenia.

Maria's father Maximilian de Beauharnais, 3rd Duke of Leuchtenberg had traveled to St. Petersburg, eventually winning the hand of Grand Duchess Maria Nikolaevna, Nicholas I's eldest daughter. Maximilian was subsequently bestowed with the style Imperial Highness and given the title Prince Romanowsky.

As the daughter of a Russian grand duchess, Maria ("Marusya") and her siblings (Nicholas, Eugen, Eugenia, Sergei, and George) were always treated as grand dukes and duchesses, bearing the styles Imperial Highness. After their father's death in 1852, their mother morganatically remarried to Count Grigori Stroganov two years later. As this union was kept secret from her father Emperor Nicholas I (and her brother Emperor Alexander II could not permit the union, preferring instead to feign ignorance), Grand Duchess Maria was forced into exile abroad. Alexander felt sympathy for his sister however, and paid special attention to her children from her first marriage, who lived in St. Petersburg without their mother.

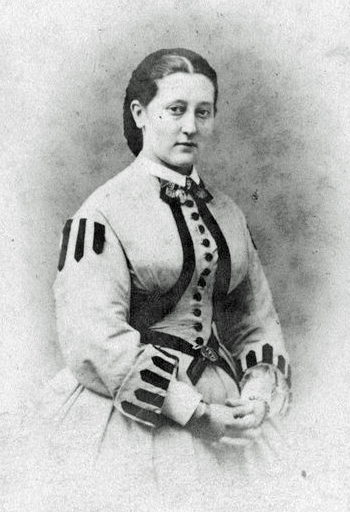
Princess Maria

=== 1866 assassination attempt on Alexander II ===
On 4 April 1866, Maria and her brother Nicholas were accompanying their uncle Alexander in St. Petersburg, when an assassination was attempted. Alexander stopped to put on an overcoat before climbing into his carriage, when a man quickly aimed a pistol at him; only the swift action of a man named Komissaroff, who knocked the man's hand up in the air, saved the emperor's life.

== Marriage ==
There were various suitors for Maria's hand in marriage. Count Pyotr Andreyevich Shuvalov, a friend of Emperor Alexander II, dared to court his niece, only to be reprimanded most severely. On 11 February 1863 in the Grand Church of the Winter Palace in St. Petersburg, she married Prince Wilhelm of Baden. He was a younger son of Leopold, Grand Duke of Baden, and his wife, Princess Sophie of Sweden.

Upon learning of the marriage, United States President Abraham Lincoln sent a letter to Wilhelm's elder brother Frederick I, Grand Duke of Baden in which Lincoln stated: "I participate in the satisfaction afforded by this happy event and pray Your Royal Highness to accept my sincere congratulations upon the occasion together with the assurances of my highest consideration".

They had two children:

- Princess Marie of Baden (Baden, 26 July 1865 - Baden, 29 November 1939); married Friedrich II, Duke of Anhalt.
- Prince Maximilian of Baden (Baden, 10 July 1867 - Konstanz, 6 November 1929); married Princess Marie Louise of Hanover (Gmunden am Traunsee 11 October 1879 - Schloß Salem 31 January 1948); had issue. Maximilian became heir apparent to the Grand Duchy of Baden on 28 September 1907.

== Later life ==
After her marriage, Maria spent most of her time in Germany, paying only rare visits to Russia. As a new wife, Maria began her duties soon after marrying, for instance representing her husband's relative Grand Duchess Louise of Baden at the christening of the Prince of Leiningen's daughter. During the Franco-Prussian War, Wilhelm served with the Prussian army under the command of Wilhelm I. On 29 July, Maria and her husband stayed with Crown Prince Frederick William, and according to the prince's memoirs, "distracted us for the moment from the anxieties of the present".

Prince Wilhelm died on 27 April 1897. After his death, Maria founded a new organization, called the German Anti-Immorality Association. Its purpose was to suppress "vice among the upper classes". Maria, with the help of Grand Duchess Eleonore of Hesse and Queen Charlotte of Württemberg, set aside a fund meant to produce pamphlets persuading both female and male royal figures that their prominent roles in society meant they should be examples of moral purity. They also sent a missive to their family and friends asking them to "abstain from immorality" for one year.

Princess Maria remained widowed until her own death, on 16 February 1914 in St. Petersburg. As with the court of St. Petersburg, Maria's death cast the Berlin court into mourning, disrupting planned court festivities.

== Honours ==
She received the following awards:

- Dame of the Order of Louise (Kingdom of Prussia)
- Dame Grand Cordon of St. Catherine (Russian Empire)
- Dame of the Order of Olga, 1871 (Kingdom of Württemberg)
- Imperial Russian and Royal Serbian Honorary Award for Voluntary Assistance in War
- Memorial Cross for 1870/71 (Grand Duchy of Baden)
- Cross of Merit for 1870/71 (Kingdom of Bavaria)

== Ancestry ==
Ancestors of Princess Maria Maximilianovna of Leuchtenberg

8. Alexandre, vicomte de Beauharnais
4. Eugène de Beauharnais, 1st Duke of Leuchtenberg
9. Joséphine Tascher de La Pagerie
2. Maximilian de Beauharnais, 3rd Duke of Leuchtenberg
10. Maximilian I Joseph of Bavaria
5. Princess Amalia Augusta of Bavaria
11. Princess Augusta Wilhelmine of Hesse-Darmstadt
1. Princess Maria of Leuchtenberg
12. Paul I of Russia
6. Nicholas I of Russia
13. Duchess Sophie Dorothea of Württemberg
3. Grand Duchess Maria Nikolaevna of Russia
14. Frederick William III of Prussia
7. Princess Charlotte of Prussia
15. Louise of Mecklenburg-Strelitz
