= Louis II of Baden =

Grand Duke of Baden from 1852 to 1858

Louis II
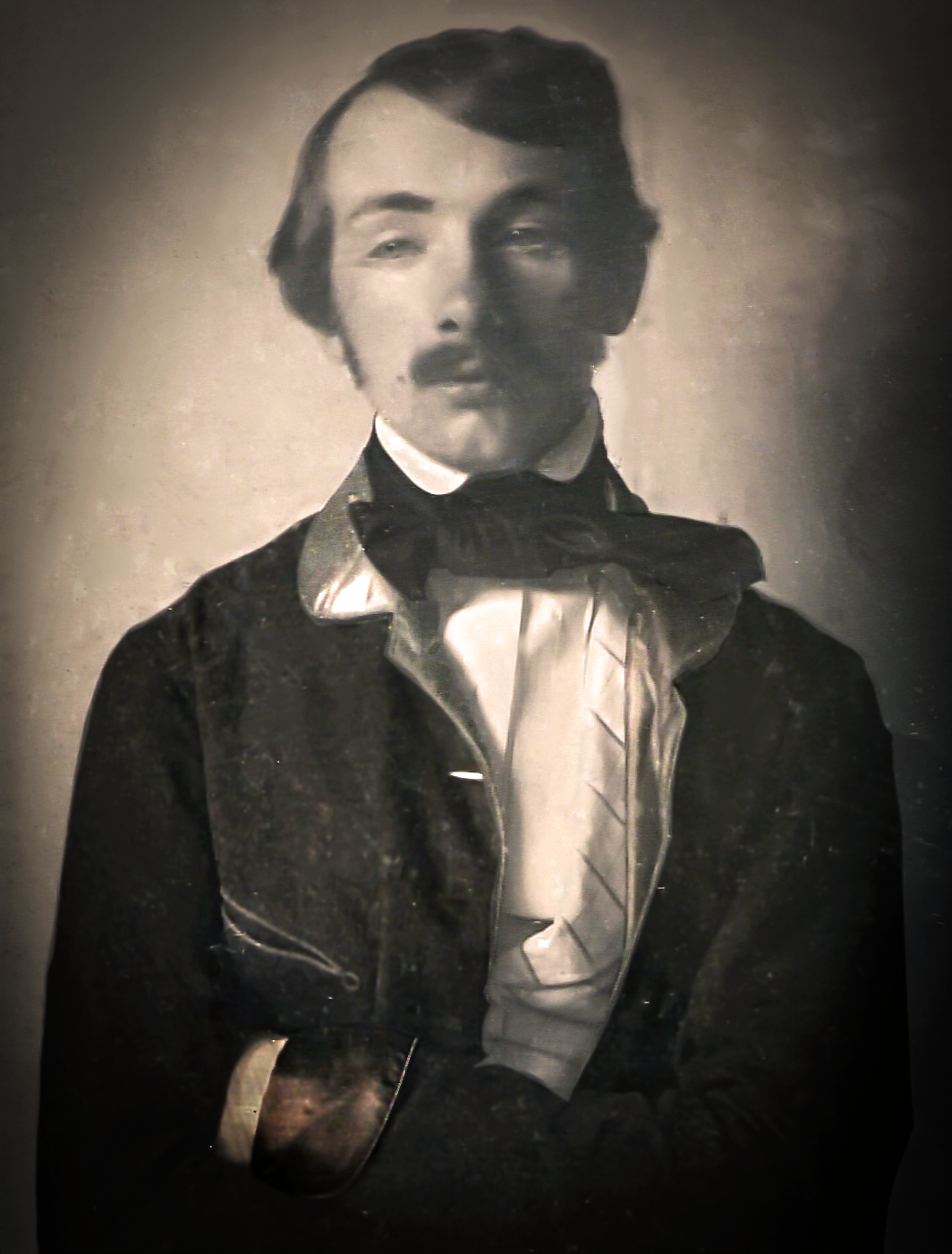
- Daguerreotype, c. 1850

Grand Duke of Baden
- Reign: 24 April 1852 – 22 January 1858
- Predecessor: Leopold I
- Successor: Frederick I
- Regent: Frederick
- Born: 15 August 1824; Karlsruhe, Grand Duchy of Baden
- Died: 22 January 1858 (aged 33); Karlsruhe, Grand Duchy of Baden
- House: House of Zähringen
- Father: Leopold I, Grand Duke of Baden
- Mother: Princess Sophie of Sweden
- Religion: Lutheranism

Louis II (German: Ludwig II.; 15 August 1824 – 22 January 1858) was Grand Duke of Baden from 24 April 1852 to his death in 1858. He was the son of Leopold I, Grand Duke of Baden, and Princess Sophie of Sweden.

== Early life ==
Louis was born on 15 August 1824 as a son of Leopold, Hereditary Prince of Baden (later Grand Duke Leopold I), and Princess Sophie of Sweden. At his birth, the Grand Duke of Baden was his paternal uncle, Louis I. As the future heirs to the throne, Louis and his younger brother, Frederick, received a modern education and often travelled to northern Italy and the Netherlands on family trips during their childhood. At the age of seven, Louis' father acceded to the throne of Baden. From December 1842 to May 1843, Louis and Frederick met high Austrian officials during a stay in Vienna. Louis later studied at the University of Heidelberg.

== Reign ==
Louis succeeded his father as Grand Duke of Baden on 24 April 1852. His brother, Frederick, acted as regent, as Louis had a mental illness. In 1856, Frederick became Grand Duke, as Louis' mental illness was deemed irreversible and permanent. He was an honorary citizen of Karlsruhe. Louis died on January 22, 1858.

== Ancestry ==
Ancestors of Louis II of Baden

8. Frederick, Hereditary Prince of Baden-Durlach
4. Charles Frederick, Grand Duke of Baden
9. Princess Amalia of Nassau-Dietz
2. Leopold, Grand Duke of Baden
10. Ludwig Heinrich, Baron Geyer of Geyersberg
5. Baroness Louise Karoline Geyer of Geyersberg
11. Countess Maximiliana Christiane of Sponeck
1. Louis II, Grand Duke of Baden
12. Gustav III of Sweden
6. Gustav IV Adolf of Sweden
13. Sophia Magdalena of Denmark
3. Princess Sophie of Sweden
14. Charles Louis, Hereditary Prince of Baden
7. Frederica of Baden
15. Landgravine Amalie of Hesse-Darmstadt

Louis II of Baden House of Zähringen Born: 15 August 1824 Died: 22 January 1858
Regnal titles
Preceded by Leopold	Grand Duke of Baden; 1852–1856	Succeeded by Frederick I
