= Princess Alexandrine of Baden =

Duchess of Saxe-Coburg and Gotha from 1844 to 1893

Alexandrine of Baden
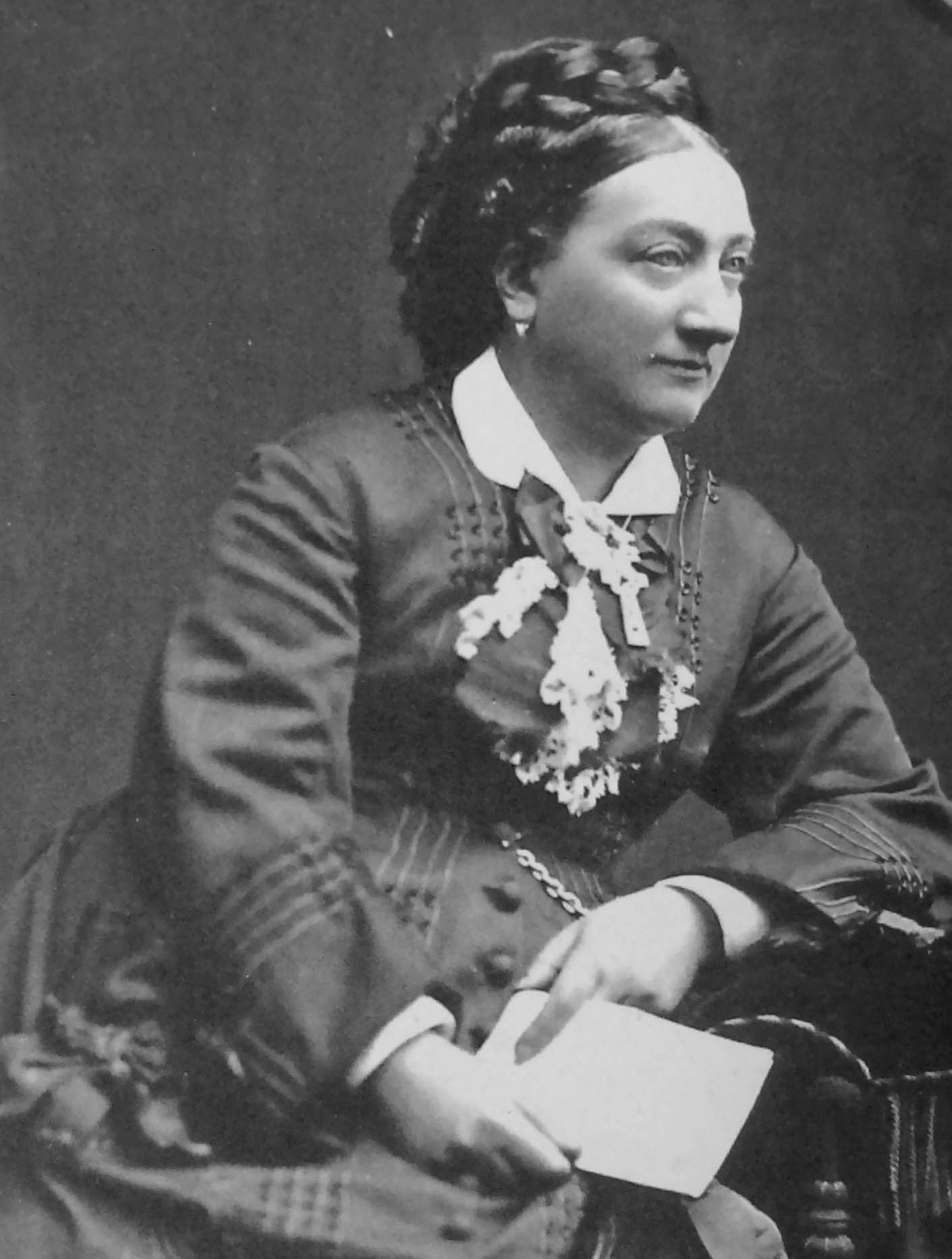

Duchess consort of Saxe-Coburg and Gotha
- Tenure: 29 January 1844 – 22 August 1893
- Born: Princess Alexandrine of Baden; 6 December 1820; Karlsruhe Palace, Karlsruhe, Grand Duchy of Baden, German Confederation
- Died: 20 December 1904 (aged 84); Callenberg Castle, Coburg, Saxe-Coburg and Gotha, German Empire
- Burial: Mausoleum at Friedhof am Glockenberg, Coburg
- Spouse: Ernest II, Duke of Saxe-Coburg and Gotha (m. 1842; died 1893)
Names
- Alexandrine Luise Amalie Friederike Elisabeth Sophie
- House: Zähringen
- Father: Leopold, Grand Duke of Baden
- Mother: Princess Sophie of Sweden

Alexandrine of Baden (Alexandrine Luise Amalie Friederike Elisabeth Sophie; 6 December 1820 – 20 December 1904) was Duchess of Saxe-Coburg and Gotha from 29 January 1844 to 22 August 1893 as the wife of Duke Ernest II. She was the eldest child of Leopold, Grand Duke of Baden, and his wife Princess Sophie of Sweden.

== Marriage ==
=== Background ===
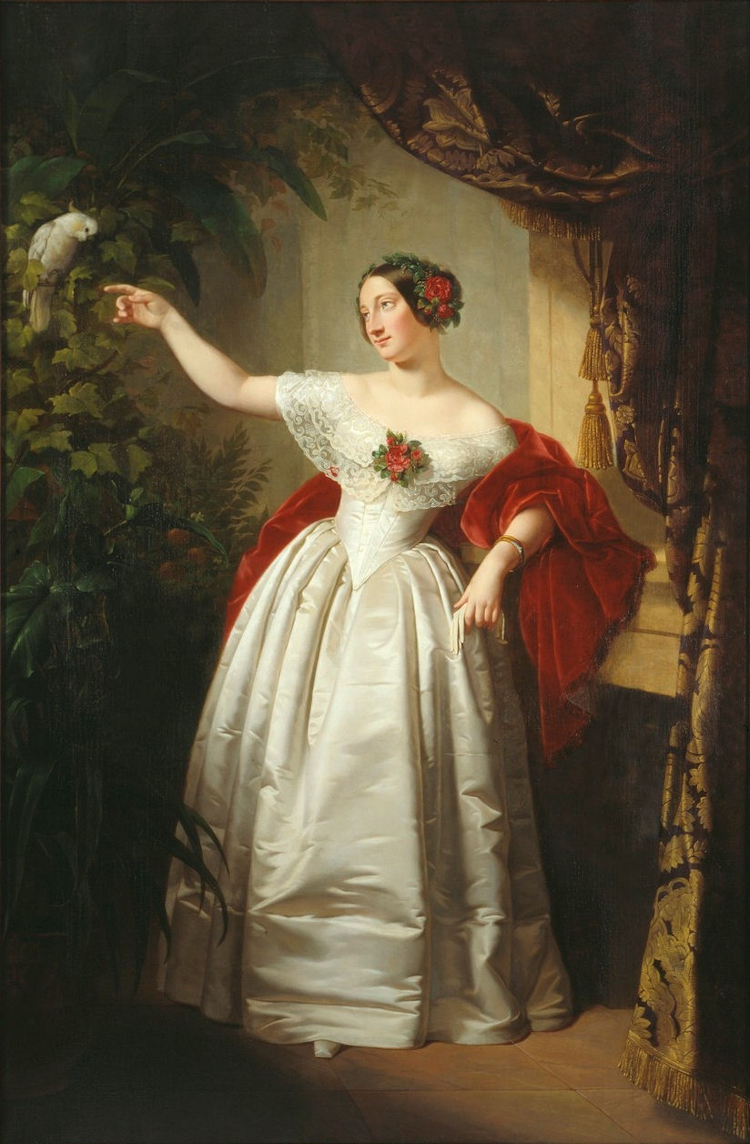
Portrait of Princess Alexandrine of Baden, 1840

Before he ascended the throne, Alexander II of Russia was sent to Baden in order to present himself as a suitor for Alexandrine's hand in marriage. Alexandrine already regarded herself as his betrothed, as all the preliminary negotiations had taken place. On the journey there, however, Alexander visited the court of Hesse-Darmstadt and met Princess Marie of Hesse and eventually married her instead.

At the urging of his brother Prince Albert, Hereditary Prince Ernst of Saxe-Coburg and Gotha (born 1818) began to search for a suitable bride. Albert believed that a wife would be good for his brother: "Chains you will have to bear in any case, and it will certainly be good for you... The heavier and tighter they are, the better for you. A married couple must be chained to one another, be inseparable, and they must live only for one another." With this advice in mind (although Albert was reprimanded for presuming to counsel his elders), Ernest began searching.

Around this time, Ernest was suffering from a venereal disease brought on by his many affairs; Albert consequently counseled him against marrying until he was fully recovered. He also warned that continued promiscuity could leave Ernest unable to father children. Ernest waited a few years before marrying as a result.

On 13 May 1842, in Karlsruhe, Ernest married Princess Alexandrine, where Queen Victoria and Prince Albert were present at the ceremony. To the consternation of his brother and sister-in-law Queen Victoria, the marriage failed to "settle down" Ernest. Alexandrine accepted all his faults cheerfully enough, however, and began a fierce devotion to Ernest that became increasingly baffling to the outside world.

=== Succession and childlessness ===
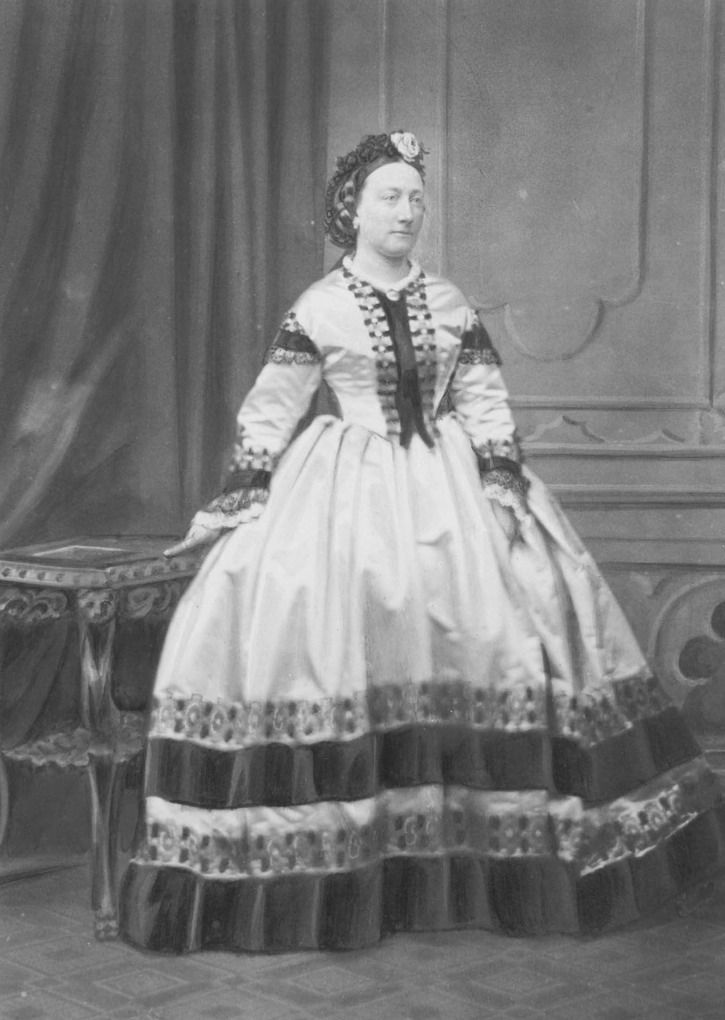
Alexandrine of Baden, Duchess of Saxe-Coburg and Gotha, 1860s

He succeeded his father, Ernst I, as Duke in 1844. The couple traveled to Windsor to visit their relations. Lady Eleanor Stanley, one of Victoria's maids-of-honour, commented to her mother:

"...the Duke is not well, they say, and he certainly looks dreadfully ill... he however shook hands with us very civilly at meeting, and seemed in great spirits at being with his brother. The Duchess [Alexandrine] told Lady Duoro she had been at Ems in hopes of producing a son and heir, but it had no effect as yet; we were rather amused at her saying it so simply, but she seems a very nice person and very pretty."

The couple's relationship at this stage was "as unclouded as it would ever be", in the words of historian Charlotte Zeepvat. While touring some farms in Windsor, Alexandrine caught a cold; they left soon after. Lady Eleanor commented again that "[Alexandrine] was very sweet at parting, and kissed us all round; she looked very delicate, as white as a sheet, and more fit to be in her bed than undertaking a long journey. The parting of the Royalty was not so sorrowful as I expected; plenty of kissing, but no tears". Victoria was sorry to see them leave, as she loved Ernest loyally for Albert's sake, and had come to see Alexandrine as a sister.

Victoria chose Ernest to be the godfather of her second daughter Princess Alice, and he was consequently expected in England in April 1859 for her confirmation. Though Victoria was eager to see Alexandrine again, and though plans had been arranged the previous year for her to visit, Ernest chose to not bring her along. It was clear that as the chances of producing children had faded, Ernest was taking less and less interest in his wife. The marriage proved to be childless. Though it was most likely that the fault lay with Ernest (due to the venereal disease he contracted before his marriage), Alexandrine seems to have accepted without question that their childlessness was her fault.

=== Ernest's affairs ===
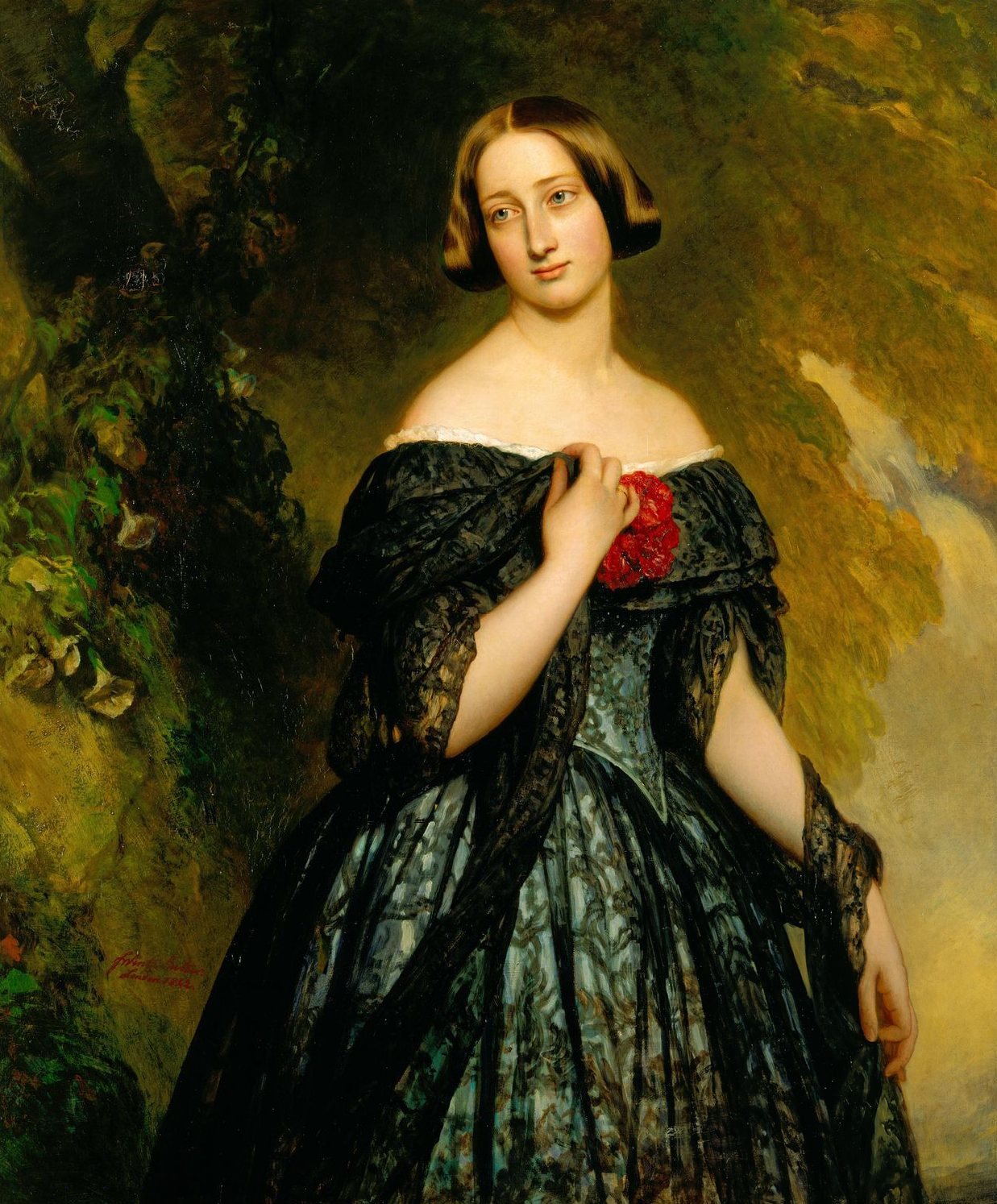
Duchess Alexandrine in 1842, by Franz Xaver Winterhalter.

Before and during their marriage, Ernest carried on countless affairs. Alexandrine remained a loyal wife, however, and chose to ignore those relationships of which she was aware. At one point, Ernest had two mistresses, and was living with them and Alexandrine "in an improbable ménage which made the couple a laughing-stock to all but their family". Although she loved Alexandrine, Victoria was appalled by her willingness to accept his affairs:

"Uncle E.'s conduct is perfectly monstrous and I must blame Aunt very much. They have not written to me yet - but when they do I shall have to write very strongly."

== Later life ==
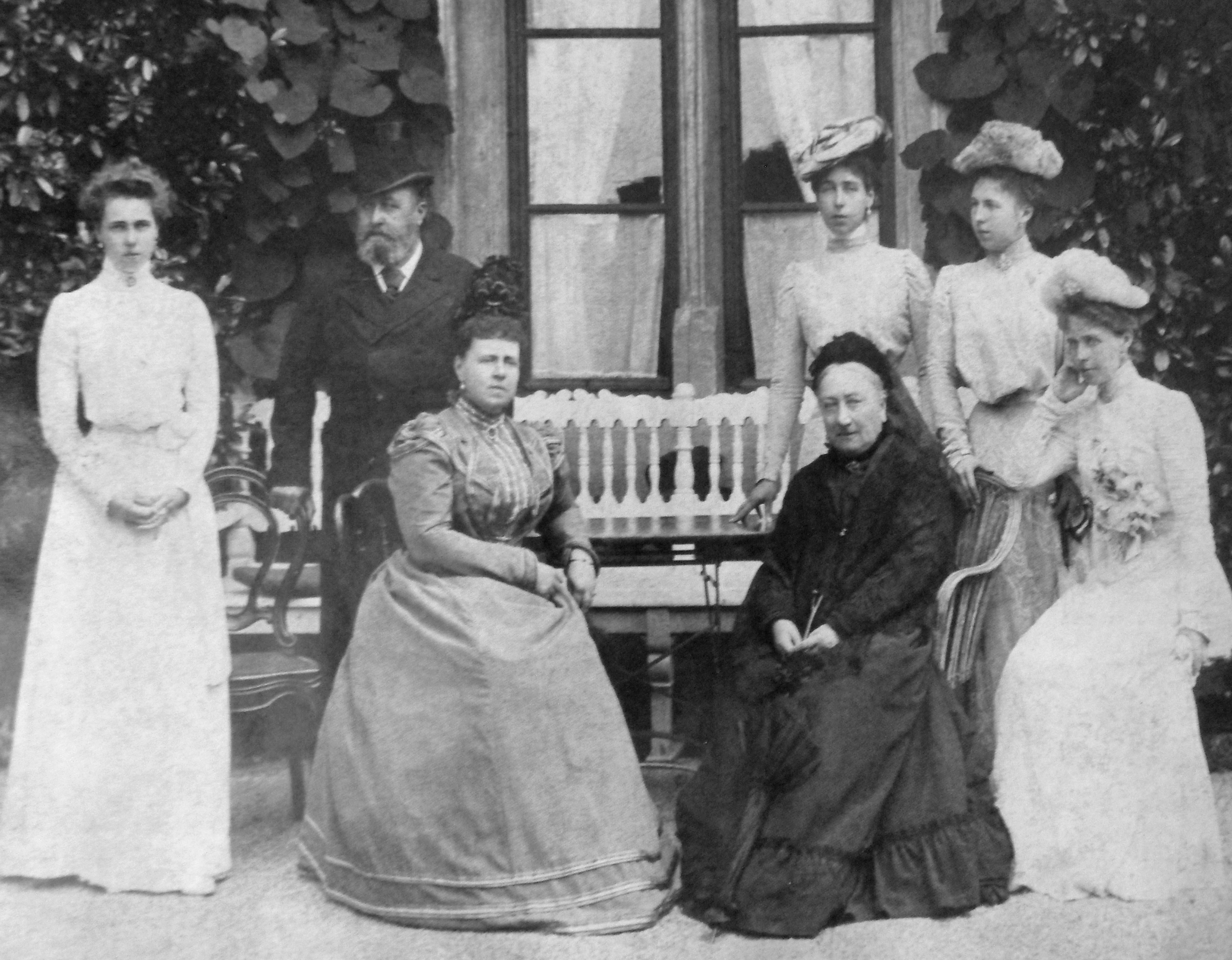
Alexandrine (in black) with family of Alfred, Duke of Saxe-Coburg and Gotha.

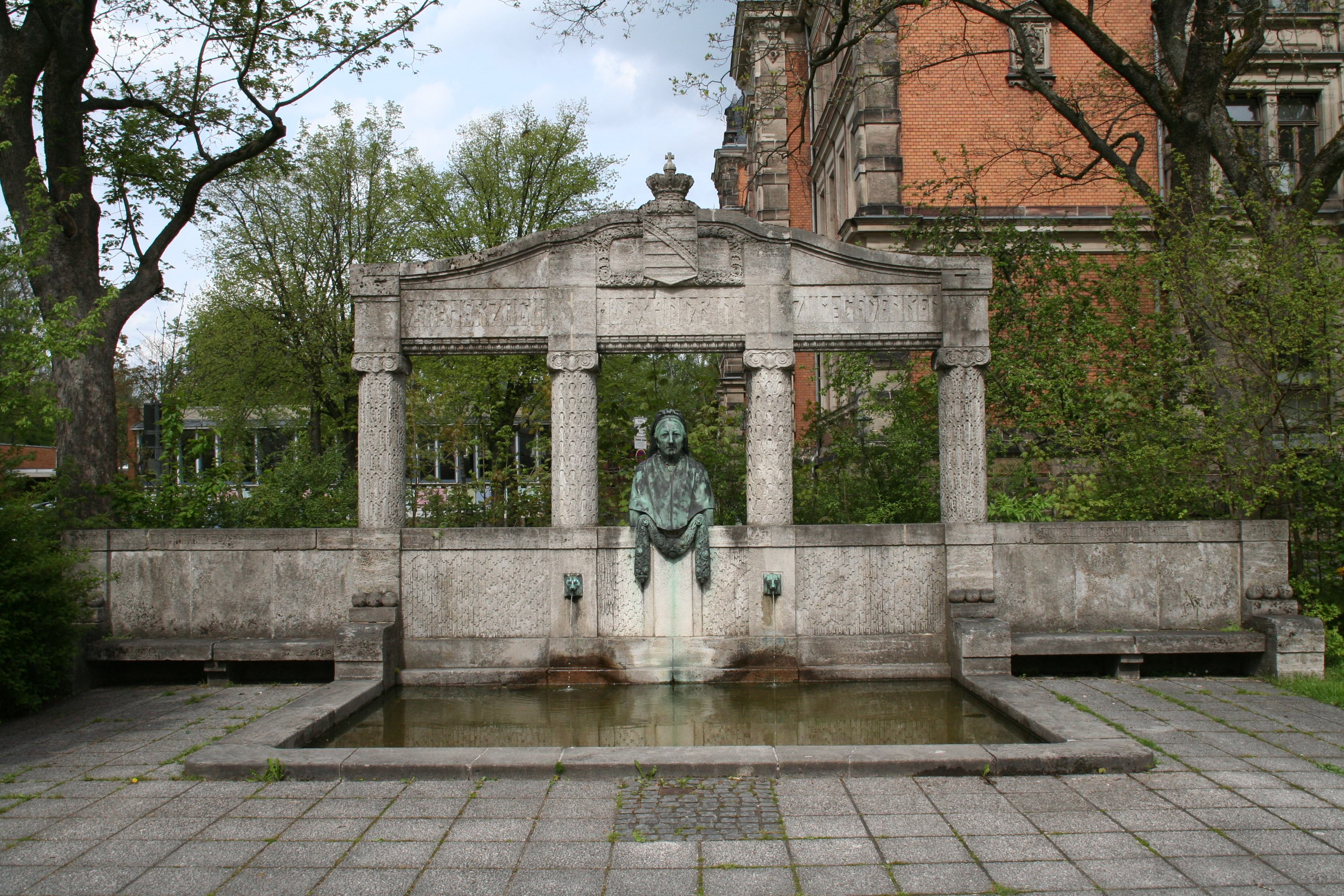
Alexandrine's memorial fountain in Coburg.

As the years went by, Ernest's behavior and manner of dress increasingly became a joke to younger generations. Marie, a daughter of Ernest's nephew and successor Prince Alfred, Duke of Edinburgh later recalled Ernest as "an old beau, squeezed into a frock-coat too tight for his bulk and uncomfortably pinched in at the waist', sporting a top hat, lemon-coloured gloves, and a rosebud in his lapel". Prince Ernest Louis of Hesse recalled how Alexandrine used to trail behind her husband calling, "Ernst, my treasure"; this caused particular embarrassment at Queen Victoria's Golden Jubilee in 1887 when Prince Ernest Louis's brother-in-law Grand Duke Sergei of Russia imitated Alexandrine, calling out to Ernest Louis "Ernst, my treasure", not realizing that the Duke was approaching from the other end of the room: "He saw my aghast expression and turned, then we both fled, escaping into different rooms. I burst out laughing but for a long time Sergei was desperately worried, because he didn't know if Uncle had heard him."

Ernest died on 22 August 1893 after a short illness. Alexandrine died on 20 December 1904, having survived her husband by eleven years.

Alexandrine is buried in the ducal mausoleum at Friedhof am Glockenberg, Coburg.

== Honours ==
- Kingdom of Portugal: Dame Grand Cross of St. Isabel

== Ancestry ==
Ancestors of Princess Alexandrine of Baden

8. Frederick, Hereditary Prince of Baden-Durlach
4. Charles Frederick, Grand Duke of Baden
9. Princess Amalia of Nassau-Dietz
2. Leopold, Grand Duke of Baden
10. Ludwig Heinrich, Baron Geyer of Geyersberg
5. Baroness Louise Caroline Geyer of Geyersberg
11. Countess Maximiliana Christiane of Sponeck
1. Princess Alexandrine of Baden
12. Gustav III of Sweden
6. Gustav IV Adolf of Sweden
13. Sophia Magdalena of Denmark
3. Princess Sophie of Sweden
14. Charles Louis, Hereditary Prince of Baden
7. Frederica of Baden
15. Landgravine Amalie of Hesse-Darmstadt

== Sources ==
- Zeepvat, Charlotte (July 2000). "The Queen and Uncle E". Royalty Digest. X (109): 1–7. Archived from the original on 19 September 2009.

Princess Alexandrine of Baden House of Baden Cadet branch of the House of Zähringen Born: 6 December 1820 Died: 20 December 1904
German royalty
Preceded by Marie of Württemberg	Duchess consort of Saxe-Coburg and Gotha; 29 January 1844 – 22 August 1893	Succeeded by Maria Alexandrovna of Russia
