= Princess Sophie of Sweden =

Grand Duchess of Baden from 1830 to 1852

Sophie of Sweden
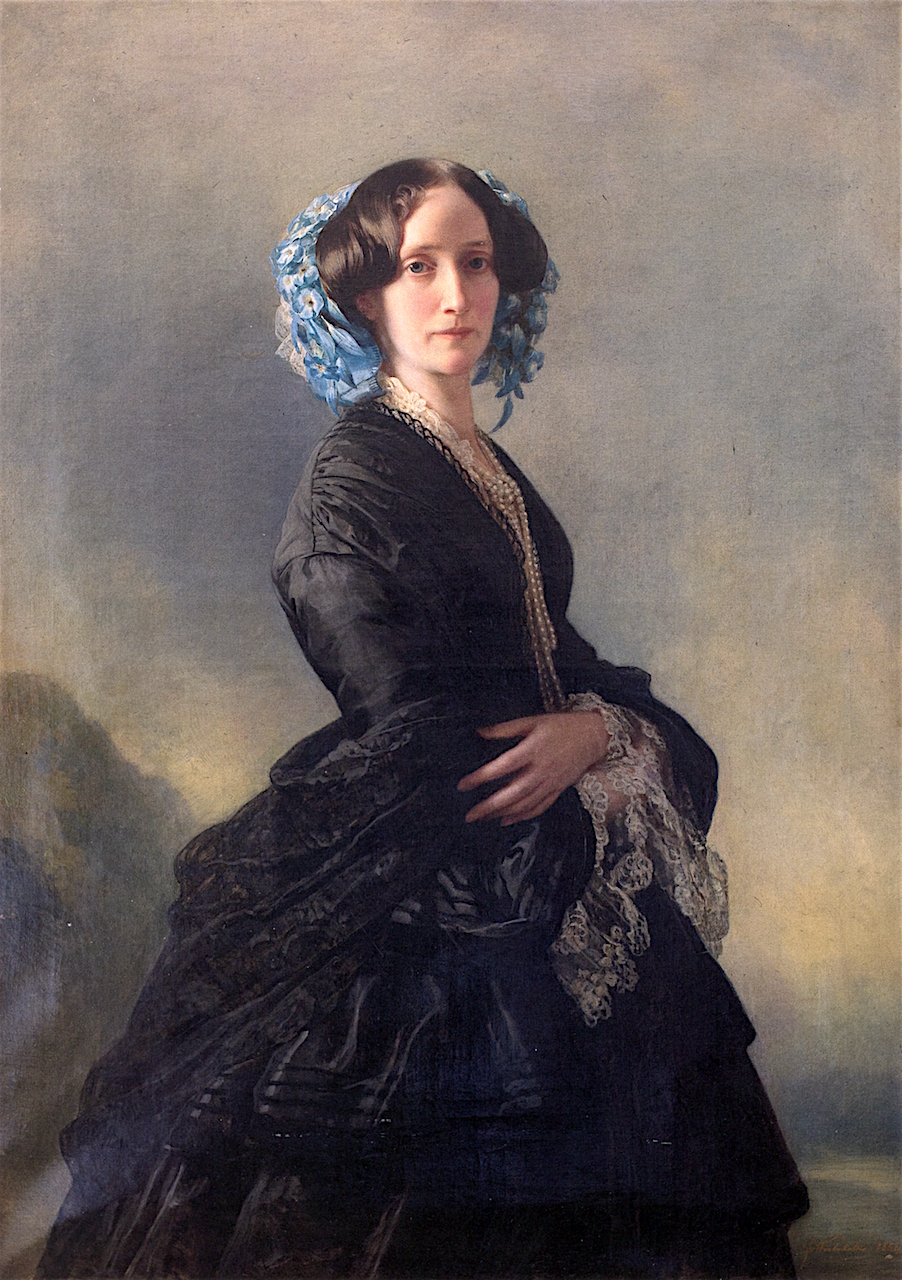
- Portrait by Franz Xaver Winterhalter, c. 1854

Grand Duchess consort of Baden
- Tenure: 30 March 1830 – 24 April 1852
- Born: 21 May 1801; Stockholm, Sweden
- Died: 6 July 1865 (aged 64); Karlsruhe, Grand Duchy of Baden
- Spouse: Leopold, Grand Duke of Baden (m. 1819; died 1852)
- Issue: Alexandrine, Duchess of Saxe-Coburg and Gotha; Prince Louis; Louis II, Grand Duke of Baden; Frederick I, Grand Duke of Baden; Prince William; Prince Karl; Marie, Princess of Leiningen; Grand Duchess Olga Feodorovna of Russia
Names
- Sophie Wilhelmine Katherine Marie Louise Charlotte Anne
- House: Holstein-Gottorp
- Father: Gustav IV Adolf of Sweden
- Mother: Frederica of Baden

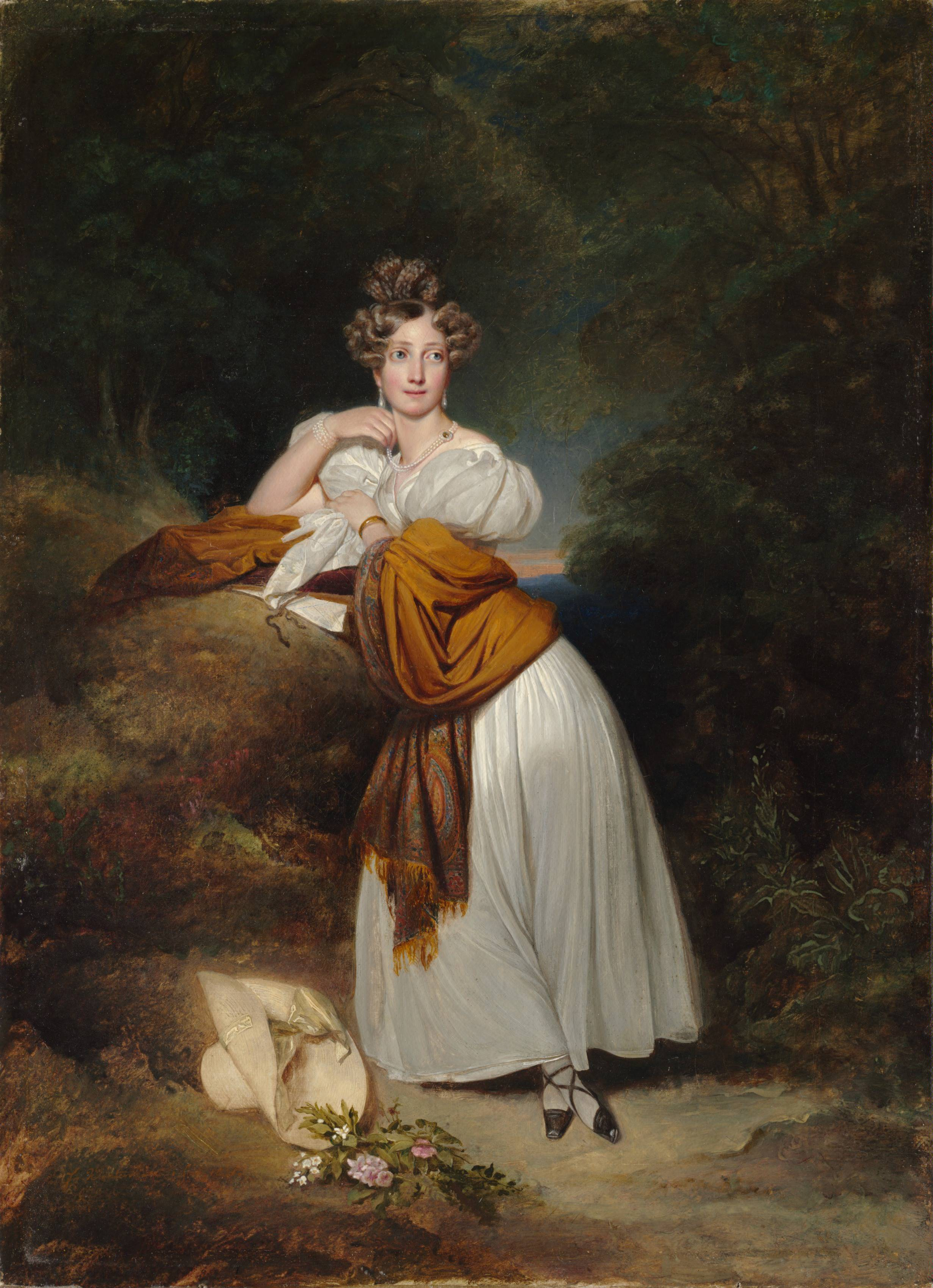
Portrait by Franz Xaver Winterhalter of Sophie of Sweden, Margravine of Baden (1831)

Sophie of Sweden (Sofia Vilhelmina Katarina Maria Lovisa Charlotta Anna; 21 May 1801 – 6 July 1865) was, by marriage, Grand Duchess of Baden as the wife of sovereign Grand Duke of Baden, Leopold.

== Biography ==
=== Early life ===
Sophie was born in Stockholm, Sweden, on 21 May 1801. She was the daughter of King Gustav IV Adolf of Sweden and his wife, Frederica of Baden. After her birth, she was raised under the supervision of the royal governesses Hedvig Ulrika De la Gardie and Charlotte Stierneld in succession.

Sophie was eight years old when her father was deposed by the Coup of 1809 and she left Sweden with her family. Between the time of the coup which deposed her father, and leaving Sweden, she and her mother were under house arrest. During this period, she was described in the famous diary of Hedwig Elizabeth Charlotte of Holstein-Gottorp as a stubborn girl who was much more haughty and possessed less self-control than her brother Gustav. An anecdote describes the contrast between the siblings. When Fredrika and her children were given permission to join the deposed king, famous Swedish nobleman Axel von Fersen came to discuss the arrangements. When he was about to leave, Sophie's older brother ran to the door to open it for Fersen. The former queen Fredrika is quoted as saying, "Sophie would never in the world have done that, she thinks of herself too highly for that."

=== Marriage ===
In 1815, she was engaged, and on 25 July 1819 in Karlsruhe, Sophie married her half-grand-uncle Prince Leopold of Baden, the son of a morganatic marriage. The marriage with Leopold had been specifically arranged by her uncle, Grand Duke Karl I of Baden, to improve the chances that Leopold would one day succeed him as grand duke because of Sophie's royal lineage; Leopold, though his right to the throne was recognized, was originally the issue of a morganatic marriage. During the reign of Louis I, Grand Duke of Baden, they lived a modest life away from court, as Louis did not want the heir to the throne at court. In 1830, her husband ascended to the grand ducal throne as Leopold I, and Sophie became Grand Duchess of Baden.

=== Grand Duchess of Baden ===
Sophie is described as wise and dutiful but strict. She kept late hours and arose late in the mornings, after which she spent hours writing letters to various relatives around Europe in her négligée. She was interested in science, art and politics, and kept herself well informed on all political events of the day through her correspondence. Her ties to the Viennese court were particularly tight, and it was to Vienna her sons were sent to complete their education. Sophie retained a certain bitterness over the deposition of her father, and took it very badly when her brother was deprived of his status as a Swedish prince. During the tumult caused by the appearance of Kaspar Hauser, Sophie was rumoured to have ordered Hauser's assassination in 1833. This damaged her relationship to her husband, and Sophie was said to have had an affair. During the revolution of 1848, she was forced to flee from Karlsruhe with her family to Strasbourg. They returned in 1849, after the revolt had been subdued by Prussian forces.

She became a widow in 1852. Sophie convinced her son Frederick to enter an arranged dynastic marriage rather than a marriage to his love, Baroness Stephanie von Gensau. In 1852, the Swedish royal house wished to make peace with the deposed Swedish royal house, and Oscar I of Sweden and Josephine of Leuchtenberg tried to arrange a meeting, but without success. In 1863, however, Sophie met the Swedish heir presumptive Prince Oscar II of Sweden and his consort Sophie of Nassau. The meeting was a success: Sophie asked him about how the Stockholm of her childhood had changed, and when they left, she presented the couple with a gift to their son prince Gustaf, a medallion with the inscription "G" and the crown of the Swedish Crown Prince, because he had the same name as her brother.

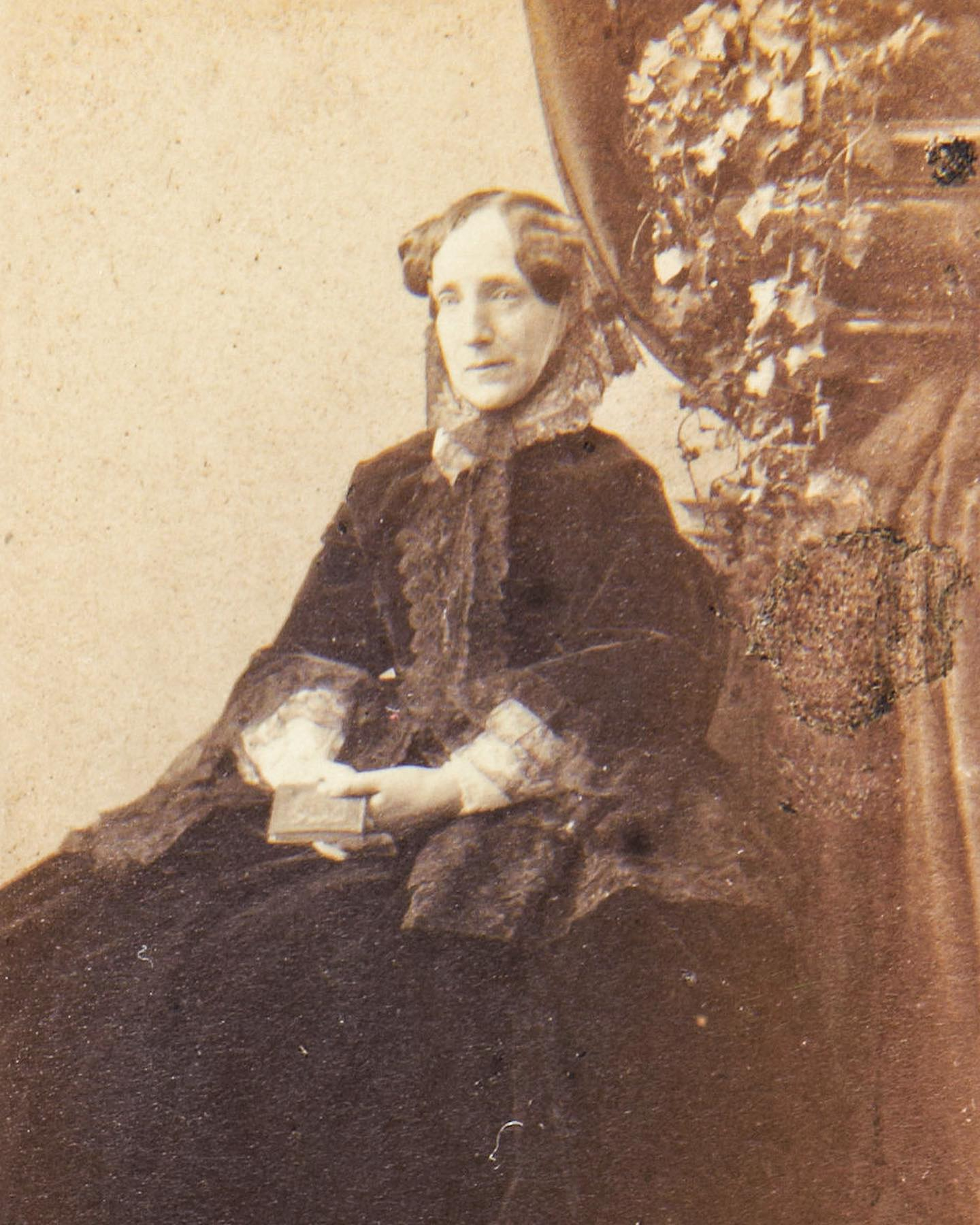
Sophie in her final years

In 1864, Sophie was interviewed by an unnamed Swedish writer, an interview which was published in her biography about famous Swedish women by Wilhelmina Stålberg (who was likely the unnamed writer in question):

Her palace was placed in a little park and had the appearance of a beautiful private residence rather than a royal palace. Beautiful trees, well tendered lawns and alleys surrounded the building. No grandeur in regard of staff or other things was visible anywhere. In the room, in which I first entered, there were an abundance of flowers and paintings. Everything there seemed to represent the home of a soul living in the solitude of her memories. I was also told that the Grand Duchess seldom appeared. She soon entered with light, bearely audible steps, a gracious figure who arrived with open arms to embrace and kiss me. [...] She soon turned the conversation to Sweden and her memories of it. She particularly remembered Haga Palace and Stockholm Royal Palace, the latter so well that, if she should ever see it again, she would have the ability to find her way in any part of the palace. I asked, if she should not make a visit to her childhood home. There had been rumours in Sweden that she had the wish to do so, and that she had written about it to King Oscar, who had assured her of a kind welcome. The Grand Duchess disregarded the rumour as "completely unfounded". She had never had a serious plan to visit Sweden, despite the fact that she often longed for it. Especially during spring she always felt a strange melancholic longing for her childhood home. But to travel there was now too late for her. This she uttered with a tearful glimmer in her big blue eyes. In any case, a true smile seemed uncharacteristic for this not-really-beautiful but very interesting face. As for the latest Swedish literature, she did read it, but all in translation, "Because", she said, "I can no longer remember the Swedish language well enough to speak or read it in person. I can however understand it spoken, and my prayers are in Swedish!"

== Family ==
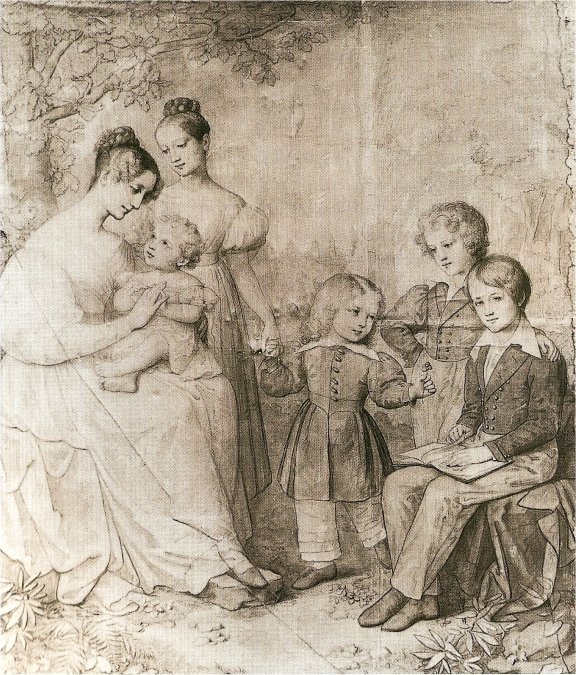
Portrait by Marie Ellenrieder (1834).

On 25 July 1819 in Karlsruhe, Sophie married her half-granduncle Leopold I of Baden. They became the paternal grandparents of the Swedish Queen consort Victoria of Baden.

Sophia and Leopold I had eight children:

- Alexandrine (6 December 1820 – 20 December 1904), married Duke Ernest II of Saxe-Coburg and Gotha (1818–93), due to their childless marriage, Ernest's younger brother Albert's British issue succeeded in that duchy.
- Ludwig (26 October 1822 – 16 November 1822)
- Louis II (15 August 1824 – 22 January 1858), reigned as Grand Duke 1852–58, deemed mentally unfit to rule.
- Frederick I (9 September 1826 – 28 September 1907), Grand Duke 1858-1907, Regent 1852–58, father of Queen Victoria of Sweden by his wife Louise of Prussia.
- William (18 December 1829 – 27 April 1897), Prussian General, married Marie of Leuchtenberg, became ancestor of the younger line of princes of Baden and father of Prince Max of Baden, German Chancellor, and later the heir of Grand Duchy.
- Charles (9 March 1832 – 3 December 1906), married Rosalie von Beust (morganatic)
- Marie (20 November 1834 – 21 November 1899), married Prince Ernest of Leiningen (1830–1904)
- Cecilie (20 September 1839 – 12 April 1891), known as Olga Feodorovna, married Grand Duke Michael Nikolaevich of Russia (1832–1902), Governor General in Tbilisi.

She died at Karlsruhe Palace on 6 July 1865.

== Ancestry ==
Ancestors of Princess Sophie of Sweden

8. Adolf Frederick, King of Sweden
4. Gustav III of Sweden
9. Louisa Ulrika of Prussia
2. Gustav IV Adolf of Sweden
10. Frederick V of Denmark
5. Sophia Magdalena of Denmark
11. Louise of Great Britain
1. Princess Sophie of Sweden
12. Charles Frederick, Grand Duke of Baden
6. Charles Louis, Hereditary Prince of Baden
13. Landgravine Caroline Louise of Hesse-Darmstadt
3. Frederica of Baden
14. Louis IX, Landgrave of Hesse-Darmstadt
7. Princess Amalie of Hesse-Darmstadt
15. Countess Palatine Caroline of Zweibrücken

== Notes ==
Princess Sophie of Sweden House of Holstein-Gottorp Born: 21 May 1801 Died: 6 July 1865
German royalty
Preceded by Stéphanie de Beauharnais	Grand Duchess consort of Baden; 30 March 1830 – 24 April 1852	Succeeded by Princess Louise of Prussia
