= Frederica of Baden =

Queen of Sweden from 1797 to 1809

Queen consort of Sweden
- Tenure: 31 October 1797 – 29 March 1809
- Coronation: 3 April 1800
- Born: 12 March 1781; Karlsruhe, Margraviate of Baden
- Died: 25 September 1826 (aged 45); Lausanne, Switzerland
- Burial: Schloss and Stiftskirche in Pforzheim
- Spouse: Gustaf IV Adolf (m. 1797; div. 1812)
- Issue: Gustav, Prince of Vasa; Sophie, Grand Duchess of Baden; Prince Carl Gustav, Grand Duke of Finland; Princess Amalia; Cecilia, Grand Duchess of Oldenburg
Names
- Friederike Dorothea Wilhelmina
- House: Zähringen
- Father: Charles Louis, Hereditary Prince of Baden
- Mother: Landgravine Amalie of Hesse-Darmstadt

Frederica of Baden (German: Frederica Dorothea Wilhelmina; 12 March 1781 – 25 September 1826) was Queen of Sweden from 1797 to 1809 as the consort of King Gustav IV Adolf.

Frederica was the fourth of eight children (including six daughters) to Charles Louis, Hereditary Prince of Baden, the only surviving legitimate son of Charles Frederick, Margrave (and later Grand Duke) of Baden, and Amalie of Hesse-Darmstadt.

In 1797, at the age of sixteen, she married King Gustav IV Adolf of Sweden, and they had five children, but the marriage was otherwise unsuccessful. Despite being admired for her beauty, she made a poor impression due to her reserved nature. Frederica was shocked by and disliked the promiscuous Swedish court.

By 1809, the political atmosphere at the Swedish court had become unstable, and King Gustaf was captured in Stockholm during the Coup of 1809, the day after leaving his wife and children at the Haga Palace, and imprisoned then deposed in favor of his uncle, now King Charles XIII. Frederica later joined her husband, and their relationship improved. Her son Gustav, however, was removed from the succession and the former royal family was forced to go into exile.

In exile, the formal royal couple's relationship took a turn for the worse; they divorced in 1812, despite Frederica's resistance, and after several attempts at reconciliation. Her final years were spent in poor health, and she died of heart disease in 1826, at the age of 45. She had been in exile for over fifteen years.

== Life ==
=== Early life ===
Friederike Wilhelmina Dorothea of Baden was born at Karlsruhe Palace in the Margraviate of Baden on 12 March 1781 as the daughter of Karl Ludwig of Baden and Amalie of Hesse-Darmstadt.

Frederica, in her family known as Frick (Frique), was given a conventional and shallow education by a French-Swiss governess in Karlsruhe, and was described as intellectually shallow. Already as a child, she was described as a beauty, but she was also reported to have a weak constitution, having had rheumatism from the age of 2.

Because her maternal aunt Natalia Alexeievna had been the first wife of Tsarevich Paul of Russia, empress Catherine the Great considered early on to choose one of them as a bride for her eldest grandson, Grand Duke Alexander of Russia. In 1792, her mother visited Russia in the company of Frederica and her sister Louise of Baden. The purpose was, unofficially, for the empress to choose one of them as a bride for her grandson. Her sister was chosen to marry Alexander, and Frederica returned to Baden in the autumn of 1793. Many of her other siblings went on to make politically important marriages.

In October 1797, Frederica of Baden married King Gustav IV Adolf of Sweden. The marriage had been arranged by Gustav IV Adolf himself, after he had refused to marry first Duchess Louise Charlotte of Mecklenburg-Schwerin, since his desired marriage to Ebba Modée had been refused him, and second the Russian Grand Duchess Alexandra Pavlovna, because her proposed marriage contract would have allowed Alexandra to keep her Orthodox faith. Frederica was seen as a suitable choice: Russia could not officially disapprove a new bride after the Russian Grand Duchess had been refused if the bride was the sister-in-law of Grand Duke Alexander, which indirectly preserved an alliance between Sweden and Russia, and additionally, Gustaf IV Adolf wanted a beautiful spouse and expected her to be so after having had a good impression of her sister during his visit to Russia the year prior. The king visited Erfurt to see her and her family himself in August 1797, the engagement was declared immediately after, and the first marriage ceremony conducted in October.

=== Queen ===
On 6 October 1797, Frederica of Baden was married per procura to king Gustav IV Adolf of Sweden in Stralsund in Swedish Pomerania, with the Swedish negotiator baron Evert Taube as proxy for the monarch. She left her mother and sister Maria, who had accompanied her to Swedish Pomerania, and was escorted by baron Taube by sea to Karlskrona in Sweden, where she was welcomed by the king. The entourage continued to Drottningholm Palace, where she was introduced to the members of the royal house and court. Finally, she made her official entrance in the capital, and the second wedding ceremony was conducted in the royal chapel on 31 October 1797. She was 16 years old.

Queen Frederica was admired for her beauty but made a bad impression because of her shyness, which caused her to isolate herself and refrain from fulfilling her ceremonial duties, and she disliked society life and representation. Her chief lady in waiting, countess Hedda Piper, reportedly contributed to her isolation by claiming that etiquette banned the queen from engaging in conversation unless introduced by her chief lady in waiting: this was in fact incorrect, but it made the queen dependent on Piper. Frederica found it difficult to adapt to court etiquette and protocol and isolated herself with her courtiers. With the exception of her chief lady in waiting, countess Piper, the king had appointed girls of about the same age as herself to be her courtiers, such as Aurora Wilhelmina Koskull, Fredrika von Kaulbars and Emilie De Geer, with whom she reportedly played children's games.

She was treated with kindness by her mother-in-law, Sophia Magdalena of Denmark, who remembered how ill she herself had been treated by her own mother-in-law.

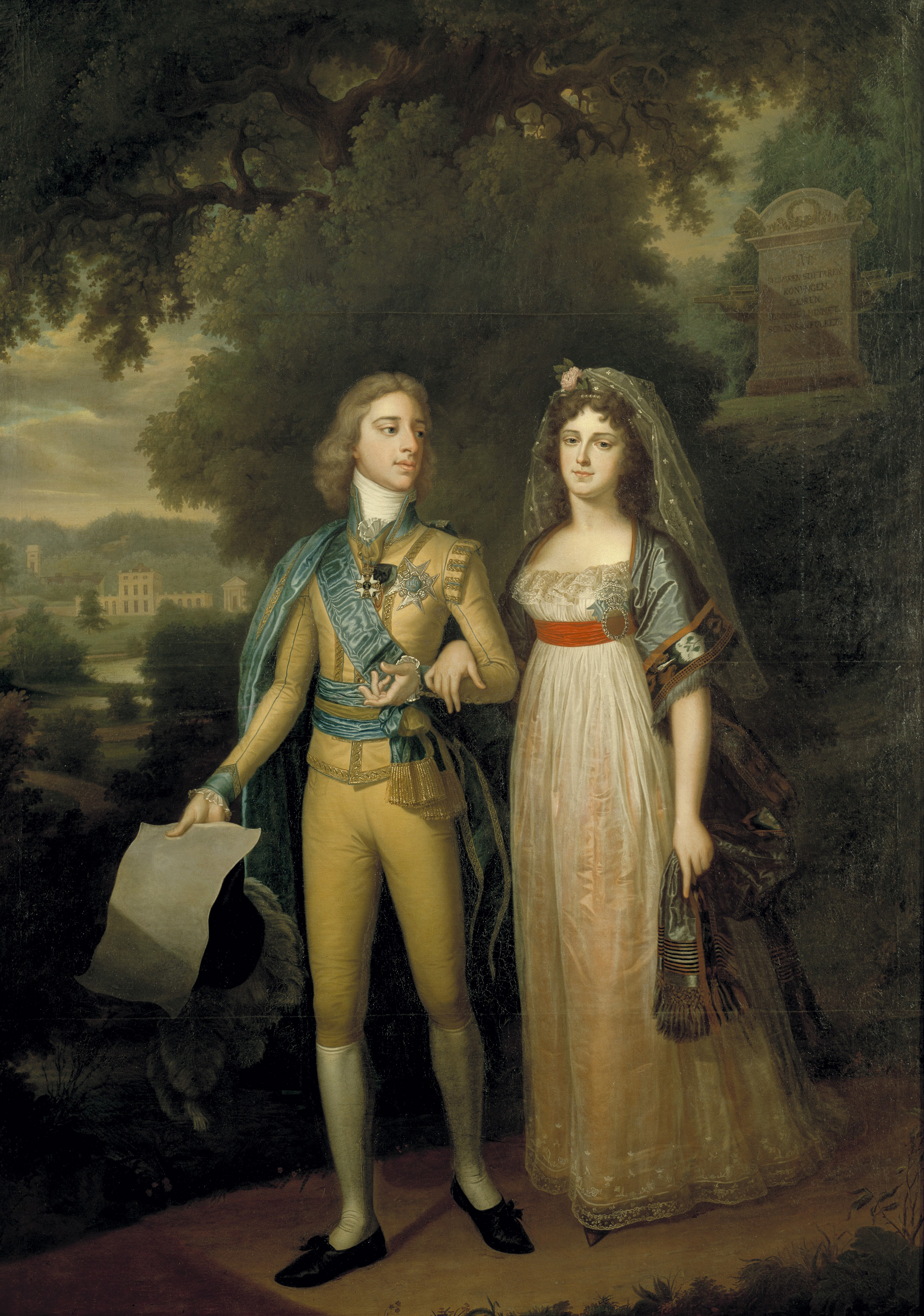
Gustav IV Adolf of Sweden and Queen Frederica

The relationship between Frederica and Gustav IV Adolf was initially not good. Both being inexperienced, they reportedly had difficulty in connecting sexually, which frustrated the king and caused him to behave with impatient displeasure and suspicion toward her, which worsened the problems because of the shyness of the introverted Frederica. This attracted attention when the king had the queen's favorite maid of honor, Anna Charlotta von Friesendorff, exiled from court for impertinence. The problems were eventually solved through the mediation of duchess Charlotte, and for the rest of her marriage, Frederica was almost constantly pregnant. This did not benefit the marriage from her point of view, as they were not sexually compatible: the king, who had a strong sexual drive but disliked extramarital sex, was sometimes delayed for hours after "having entered the queen's bed chamber" in the morning, so much that the members of the royal council saw themselves obliged to interrupt and ask the king to "spare the queen's health", while Frederica complained in letters to her mother how it tired and exhausted her without giving fulfillment. Frederica was shocked and intrigued by the sexually liberal Swedish court, and wrote to her mother that she was likely the only woman there who did not have at least three or four lovers, and that the royal duchess Charlotte was said to have both male and female lovers.

The relationship between the king and the queen improved after the birth of their first child in 1799, after which they lived an intimate and harmonious family life in which they grew close through their mutual interest in their children. The king was reportedly protective toward her and guarded her sexual innocence. In 1800, he had all her young maids of honor relieved from their positions because of their frivolous behavior and replaced with older married ladies-in-waiting, such as Hedvig Amalia Charlotta Klinckowström and Charlotta Aurora De Geer, and six years later, when a frivolous play was performed by a French theater company at the Royal Swedish Opera in the presence of the queen, the king had the French theater company exiled and the Opera closed down.

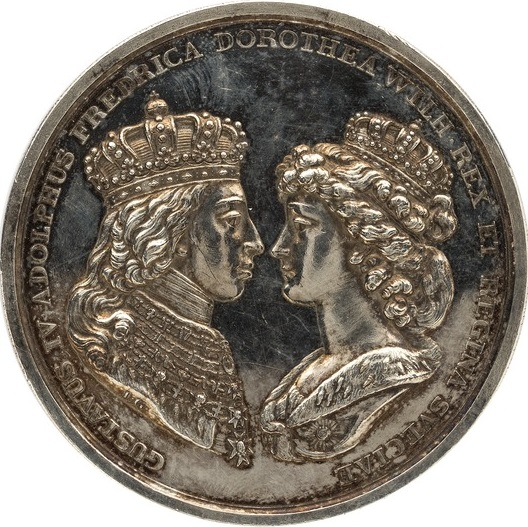
Frederica's and Gustav Adolf's coronation medal

Queen Frederica was crowned with her spouse in Norrköping 3 April 1800. The royal couple did not participate much in representation and preferred an intimate family life in the small Haga Palace, where they isolated themselves from court life with a small entourage. Frederica amused the king by her skillful clavichord playing, was reportedly joyful in the company of her small circle of friends, especially in the absence of the monarch, and devoted herself to the upbringing of her children. She kept in close correspondence with her family, and in 1801 welcomed her parents, who visited Sweden after having been in Russia to see her sister. During this visit she was reportedly reproached by her mother for her stiff and distant behavior in public and not being able to make herself popular. The visit ended in tragedy when her father died when his carriage skidded off the icy road and overturned. In 1802, Frederica accompanied her spouse to the province of Finland, during which a meeting was arranged between her and her sisters, the Russian empress Elizabeth and Amalie, in Abborrfors on the border. Gustav IV Adolf promised to visit her family in Baden, and in the summer of 1803, they traveled to Karlsruhe. They did not return until February 1805, which created some friction in Sweden, and Frederica was somewhat blamed for the long absence of the monarch.

She was not allowed to accompany the king when he left for Germany to participate in the War of the Fourth Coalition in November 1805, nor was she appointed to serve in the regency during his absence. During his absence, however, she came to be regarded as a symbol of moral support, and duchess Charlotte describes the dramatic scene when the queen returned to the royal palace in Stockholm after having said goodbye to the king: "The members of government and the court of their majesties met her in the palace hall. Crying of bitterness she walked upstairs directly to the apartments of the children, where the members of the royal house were gathered. Close to faint, she could hardly breath and fell down upon a couch. There she lay with the handkerchief to her eyes, exposed to the deepest pain, surrounded by the children, who rushed to her, and the rest of us who, very concerned, tried to show her sympathy. She truly gave the impression of already being a widow, especially since she was dressed in black. I can not describe the touching scene! Add her youth and beauty, a beauty highlighted by the sorrow, and nothing was lacking to arouse the most fervent compassion for the poor queen." During the rest of the king's absence, she attracted public sympathy for isolating herself completely as a display of sorrow and longing after the king.

In the winter of 1806–1807, she joined the king in Malmö, where she hosted her sister Princess Marie of Baden, who was a refugee after having fled Napoleon's conquest of the Duchy of Brunswick.

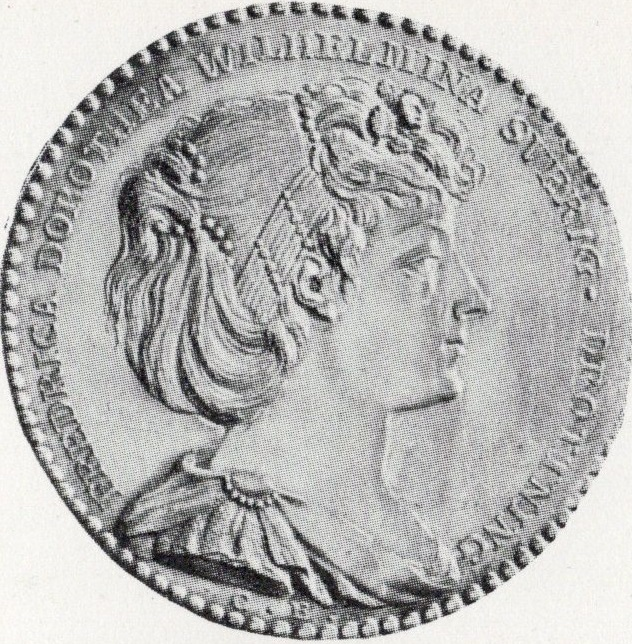
Commemorative medal about 1805

Frederica had no direct influence on the affairs of state, and does not seem to have been interested in them except when they affected her small circle of family and friends. She was, however, indirectly involved in politics through her family and especially through her mother, who reportedly influenced her spouse against emperor Napoleon.

In 1807, during the War of the Fourth Coalition, Frederica intervened politically. Her sister, the Russian Empress, sent her a letter through their mother, writing that she should use her influence to advise the king to make peace with France, and that anything else would be a mistake. Frederica did make an attempt to accomplish this, but the king viewed it as an attempt to influence him in favor of Napoleon, and her interference in the matter caused a conflict between the two. In one political issue, Frederica took an interest during her marriage and successfully enforced her will, though her reason was not political. Even during the first years of their marriage, the king often spoke of his wish to abdicate in favor of a simple life as a private person abroad. To this, Frederica always objected and did not hesitate to press her opinion, even when it led to arguments. Her main reason for this was reportedly that if her spouse abdicated, it would result in them having to leave their son, who would succeed his father, behind.

=== Coup ===
On 12 March 1809, King Gustav IV Adolf left her and the children at Haga Palace to deal with the rebellion of Georg Adlersparre. The day after, he was captured at the royal palace in Stockholm in the Coup of 1809, imprisoned at Gripsholm Castle and deposed on 10 May in favor of his uncle, who succeeded him as Charles XIII of Sweden on 6 June. According to the terms deposition made on 10 May 1809, she was allowed to keep the title of queen even after the deposition of her spouse.

Frederica and her children were kept under guard at Haga Palace. The royal couple was initially kept separated because the coup leaders suspected her of planning a coup. During her house arrest, her dignified behavior reportedly earned her more sympathy than she had been given her entire tenure as queen. Her successor, Queen Charlotte, who felt sympathy for her and often visited her, belonged to the Gustavians and wished to preserve the right to the throne for Frederica's son, Gustav. Frederica told her that she was willing to separate from her son for the sake of succession, and requested to be reunited with her spouse. Her second request was granted her after intervention from queen Charlotte, and Frederica and her children joined Gustav Adolf at Gripsholm Castle after the coronation of the new monarch on 6 June. The relationship between the former king and queen was reportedly well during their house arrest at Gripsholm.

During her house arrest at Gripsholm Castle, the question of her son crown prince Gustav's right to the throne was not yet settled and a matter of debate.

There was a plan by a Gustavian military fraction led by General Eberhard von Vegesack to free Frederica and her children from the arrest, have her son declared monarch and Frederica as regent of Sweden during his minority. These plans were in fact presented to her, but she declined: "The Queen displayed a nobility in her feelings, which makes her worthy of a crown of honor and placed her above the pitiful earthly royalty. She did not listen to the secret proposals, made to her by a party, who wished to preserve the succession of the crown prince and wished, that she would remain in Sweden to become the regent during the minority of her son... she explained with firmness, that her duty as a wife and mother told her to share the exile with her husband and children." The removal of her son from the succession order, however, she nevertheless regarded as a legally wrongful.

The family left Sweden on 6 December 1809, via three separate carriages. Gustav Adolf and Frederica traveled in one carriage, escorted by general Skjöldebrand; their son Gustav traveled in the second with colonel baron Posse; and their daughters and their governess von Panhuys traveled in the last carriage escorted by colonel von Otter. Frederica was offered to be escorted with all honors due to a member of the house of Baden if she traveled alone, but declined and brought no courtier with her, only her German chamber maid Elisabeth Freidlein. The family left for Germany by ship from Karlskrona on 6 December.

=== Exile ===
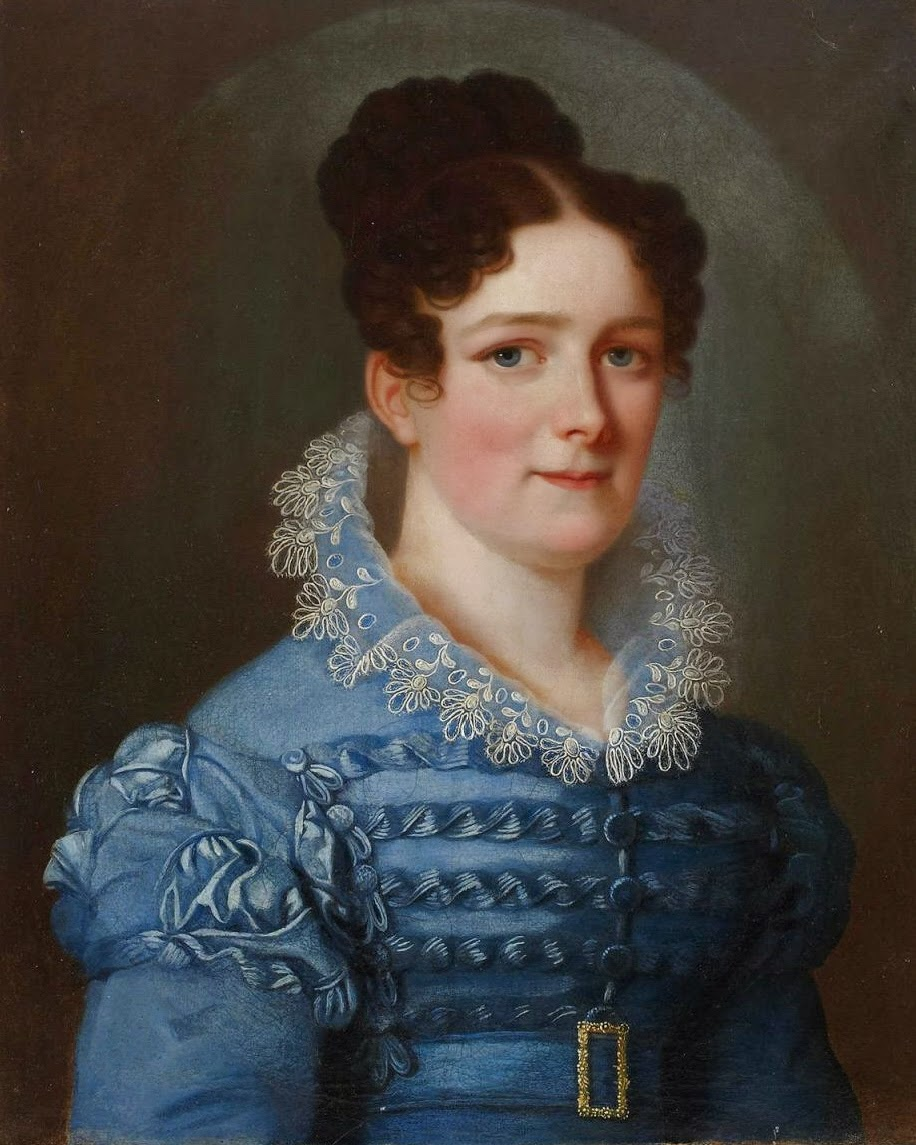
Frederica in exile by Franz Seraph Stirnbrand, c. 1824

After having been denied to travel to Great Britain, the former king and queen settled in the duchy of Baden, where they arrived 10 February 1810. After having become private persons, the incompatibility between Frederica and Gustav Adolf immediately became known in their different view in how to live their life. Gustav Adolf wished to live a simple family life in a congregation of the Moravian church in Christiansfeld in Slesvig or Switzerland, while Frederica wished to settle in the palace Meersburg at Bodensee, which was granted her by her family. Their sexual differences was also brought to the surface, as Frederica refused sexual intercourse because she did not wish to give birth to exiled royalty. These differences caused Gustav Adolf to leave alone for Basel in Switzerland in April 1810, from which he expressed complaints about their sexual incompatibility and demanded a divorce.

The couple made two attempts to reconcile in person: once in Switzerland in July, and a second time in Altenburg in Thüringen in September. The attempts of reconciliation was unsuccessful and in 1811, Gustav Adolf issued divorce negotiations with her mother, stating that he wished to be able to marry again. Frederica was not willing to divorce, and her mother suggested that Gustav Adolf entered some kind of secret morganatic marriage on the side to avoid the scandal of divorce. Gustav Adolf did agree to this suggestion, but as they could not figure out how such a thing should be arranged, a proper divorce was finally issued in February 1812. In the divorce settlement, Gustav Adolf renounced all his assets in both Sweden and abroad, as well as his future assets in the form of his inheritance rights after his mother, to his children; he also renounced the custody and guardianship of his children. Two years later, Fredrica placed her children under the guardianship of her brother-in-law, the Russian Tsar Alexander. Frederica kept in contact through correspondence with queen Charlotte of Sweden, whom she entrusted her economic interests in Sweden, as well as with her former mother-in-law, and while she did not contact Gustav Adolf directly, she kept informed about his life and often contributed financially to his economy without his knowledge.

Frederica settled in the castle Bruchsal in Baden, but also acquired several other residences in Baden as well as a country villa, Villamont, outside Lausanne in Switzerland. In practice, she spent most of her time in the court of Karlsruhe from 1814 onward, and also traveled a lot around Germany, Switzerland and Italy, using the name Countess Itterburg after a ruin in Hesse, which she had acquired.

In accordance with the abdication terms, she kept her title of queen and had her own court, headed by the Swedish baron O. M. Munck af Fulkila, and kept in close contact with her many relatives and family in Germany. According to her ladies-in-waiting, she turned down proposals from her former brother-in-law Frederick William of Braunschweig-Oels, and Frederick William III of Prussia. She was rumoured to have secretly married her son's tutor, the French-Swiss J.N.G. de Polier-Vernland, possibly in 1823.

In 1819, her daughter Sophia married the heir to the throne of Baden, Frederica's paternal half-granduncle, the future Grand Duke Leopold I of Baden.

Her last years were plagued by weakened health. She died in Lausanne of a heart disease on 25 September 1826 and was buried in Schloss and Stiftskirche in Pforzheim, Germany.

== Legacy ==
The communities of Fredrika (1799), Dorotea (1799) and Vilhelmina (1804) located in Swedish Lapland were named in her honor. The square Drottningtorget (Queen's square) in Malmö is also named after her.

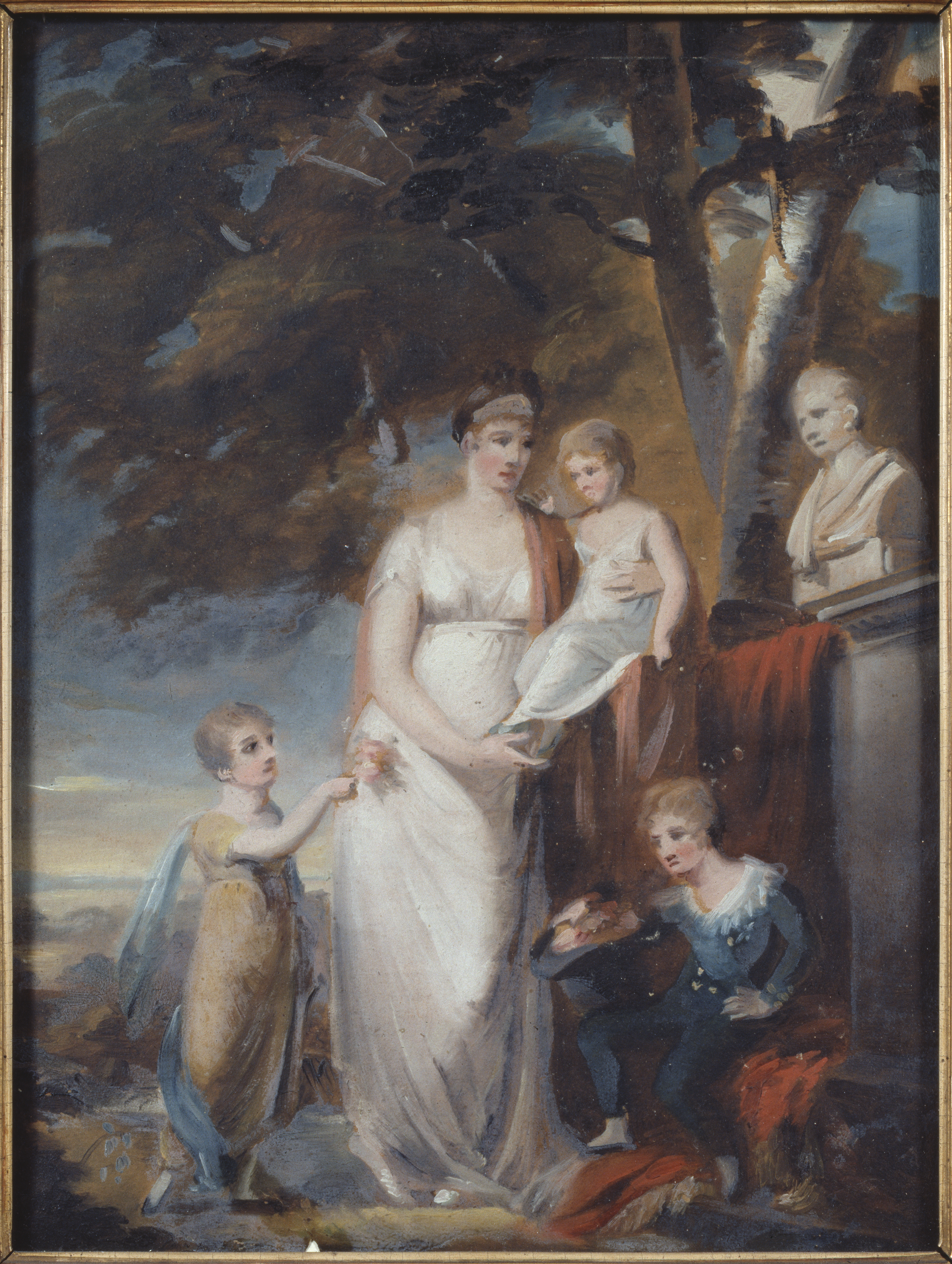
Queen Frederica and her children, painted by Carl Frederik von Breda

== Issue ==
- Crown Prince Gustaf, after 1809 known as Gustaf Gustafsson of Vasa (9 November 1799 – 4/5 August 1877); married Princess Louise Amelie of Baden.
- Princess Sofia Wilhelmina of Sweden, (21 May 1801 – 6 July 1865); married Grand Duke Leopold I of Baden. Their granddaughter Victoria of Baden became Queen of Sweden.
- Prince Carl Gustaf, Grand Duke of Finland (Drottningholm, 2 December 1802 – Haga Palace, 10 September 1805).
- Princess Amalia of Sweden (Stockholm, 22 February 1805 – Vienna, 31 August 1853); unmarried.
- Princess Cecilia of Sweden (22 June 1807 – 27 January 1844); married Augustus, Grand Duke of Oldenburg.

== Arms and monogram ==
Coat of arms of Queen Frederica of Sweden	Royal monogram of Queen Frederica of Sweden

== Ancestors ==
Ancestors of Frederica of Baden

8. Friedrich, Hereditary Prince of Baden-Durlach
4. Charles Frederick, Grand Duke of Baden
9. Princess Amalia of Nassau-Dietz
2. Charles Louis, Hereditary Prince of Baden
10. Louis VIII, Landgrave of Hesse-Darmstadt
5. Landgravine Karoline Luise of Hesse-Darmstadt
11. Charlotte of Hanau-Lichtenberg
1. Frederica of Baden
12. Louis VIII, Landgrave of Hesse-Darmstadt (=10)
6. Louis IX, Landgrave of Hesse-Darmstadt
13. Charlotte of Hanau-Lichtenberg (=11)
3. Landgravine Amalie of Hesse-Darmstadt
14. Christian III, Count Palatine of Zweibrücken
7. Countess Palatine Caroline of Zweibrücken
15. Caroline of Nassau-Saarbrücken

== Notes ==
Frederica of Baden House of Zähringen Born: 12 March 1781 Died: 25 September 1826
Swedish royalty
Preceded by Sophia Magdalena of Denmark	Queen consort of Sweden; 1797–1809	Succeeded by Hedvig Elisabeth Charlotte of Holstein-Gottorp
