= Princess Louise of Prussia =

Grand Duchess of Baden from 1856 to 1907

Louise
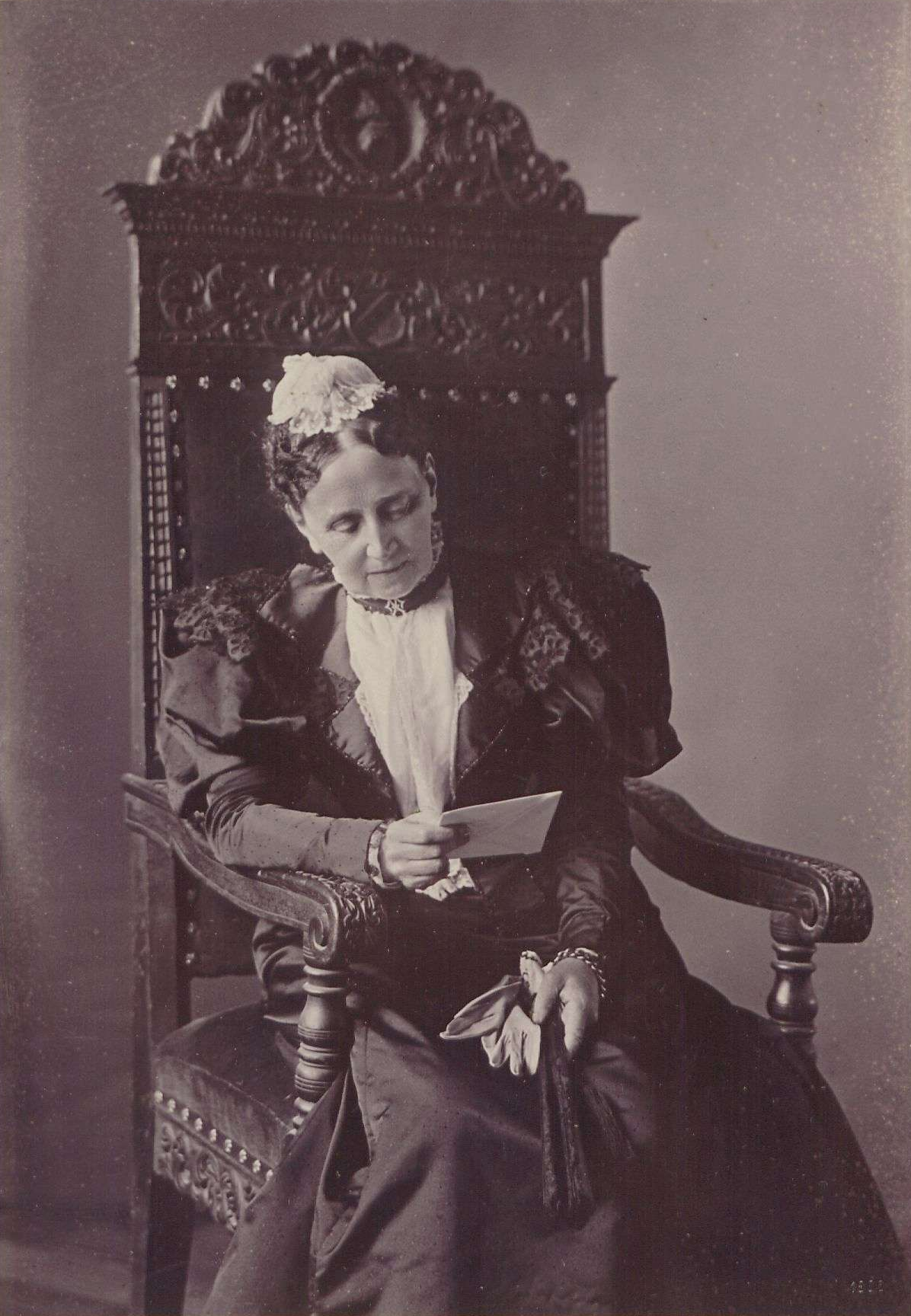
- The Grand Duchess in 1890

Grand Duchess consort of Baden
- Tenure: 23 January 1858 – 28 September 1907
- Born: 3 December 1838; Berlin, Kingdom of Prussia
- Died: 23 April 1923 (aged 84); Baden-Baden, Republic of Baden, Weimar Republic
- Burial: Karlsruhe
- Spouse: Frederick I, Grand Duke of Baden (m. 1856; died 1907)
- Issue: Frederick II, Grand Duke of Baden; Victoria, Queen of Sweden; Prince Ludwig
Names
- Luise Marie Elisabeth
- House: Hohenzollern
- Father: William I, German Emperor
- Mother: Augusta of Saxe-Weimar-Eisenach

Princess Louise of Prussia, Grand Duchess of Baden (Luise Marie Elisabeth; 3 December 1838 – 23 April 1923) was Grand Duchess of Baden from 1858 to 1907 as the wife of Grand Duke Frederick I. Princess Louise was the second child and only daughter of Wilhelm I, German Emperor, and Augusta of Saxe-Weimar-Eisenach. She was the younger sister of Frederick William ("Fritz"), the future German Emperor Frederick III, and aunt of Emperor Wilhelm II.

== Princess of Prussia ==
Louise Marie Elisabeth was born on 3 December 1838 to Prince Wilhelm of Prussia and his wife Princess Augusta of Saxe-Weimar-Eisenach. Louise was named after her grandmothers, Louise, Queen of Prussia and Grand Duchess Maria Pavlovna of Russia and was known as "Vivi" in her family. Her parents were a happy but tense couple, and Louise had only one other sibling, Prince Frederick William, who was seven years older. Upon her birth, Augusta declared that her duty in perpetuating the Hohenzollern dynasty was complete.

While Wilhelm showed some outward affection to his only son, he lavished attention on Louise, and often his unexpected visits to her schoolroom resulted in them playing together on the floor. Mother and daughter however were not close, with Augusta's presence filling Louise up with awe; one account states that when Augusta encountered her daughter, Louise "involuntarily drew herself up to her full height, and sat stiff and constrained as for her portrait, while she inwardly trembled lest her answers should prove incorrect". In the early 1850s, Louise was educated by Adèle de Pierre of Neuchâtel.

== Grand Duchess of Baden ==
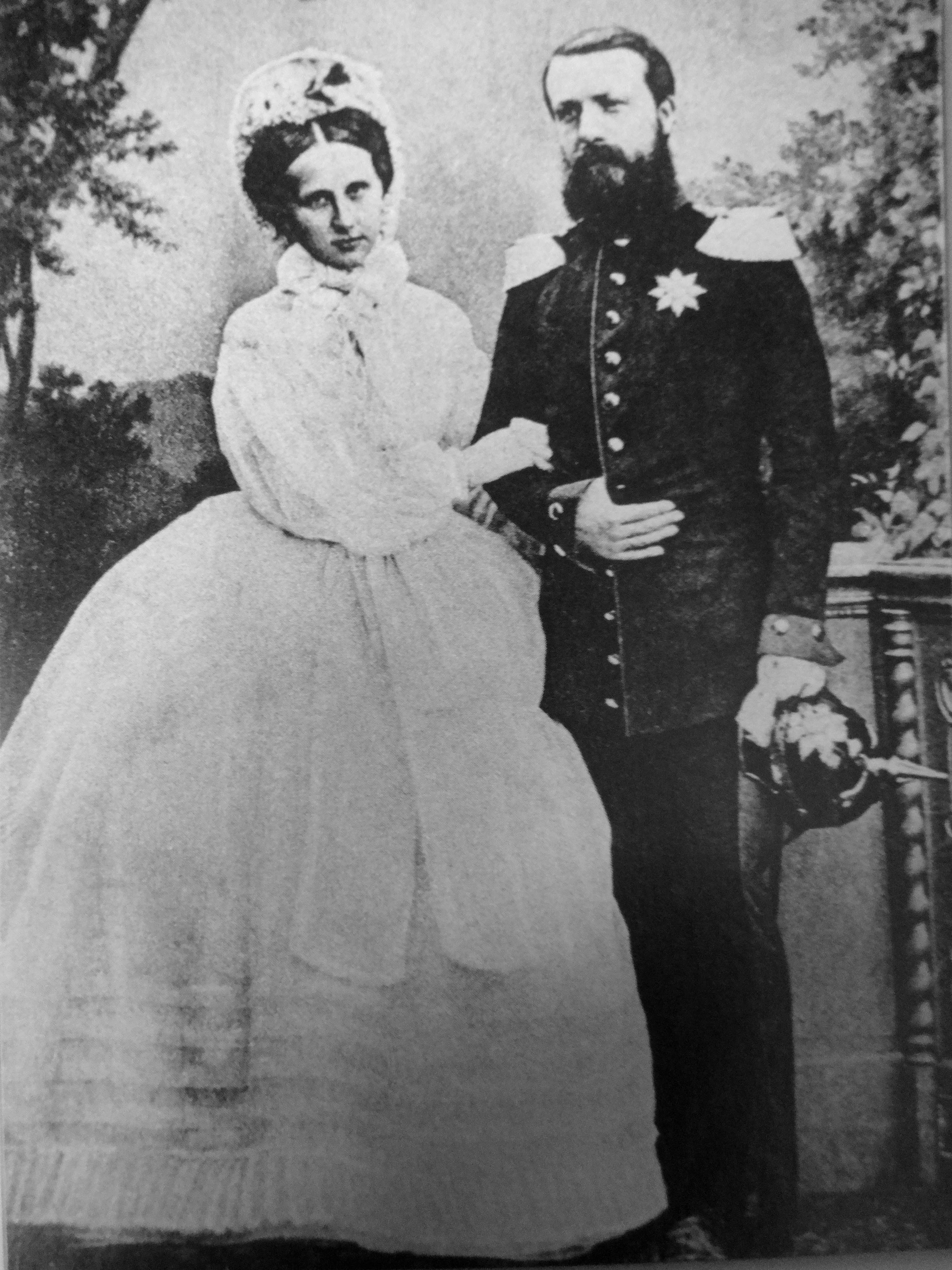
Grand Duchess Louise and Grand Duke Frederick I of Baden

Louise was betrothed to Frederick, Prince Regent of Baden, in 1854, and they married 20 September 1856 at Neues Palais in Potsdam. Frederick became regent because of the insanity of his brother Louis II, Grand Duke of Baden. Frederick himself was proclaimed Grand Duke when doctors declared that there was no chance of recovery. As the only daughter of the Prussian crown prince (and later emperor), their marriage caused Baden to gain a great deal of importance, even more so once the German Empire was founded.

Within a few weeks of their marriage, the new grand duchess was already pregnant with their first child, Hereditary Grand Duke Frederick. Louise was a happy wife and mother, writing to a friend that "since we last met, my life has become so much more beautiful, more precious, to me, my happiness is so much richer and deeper than before".

Louise and Frederick disliked the apparent stiffness of the Karlsruhe court, and gladly escaped to their castle on the island of Mainau. They were popular in Baden, and people spoke with affectionate pride of their grand duke and duchess in Constance, where the couple had a summer residence.

=== Later years ===
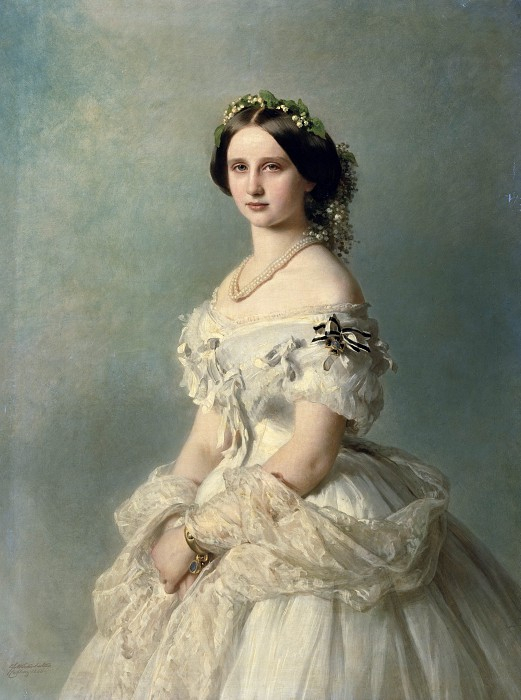
Princess Louise of Prussia in 1856, portrait by Franz Xaver Winterhalter

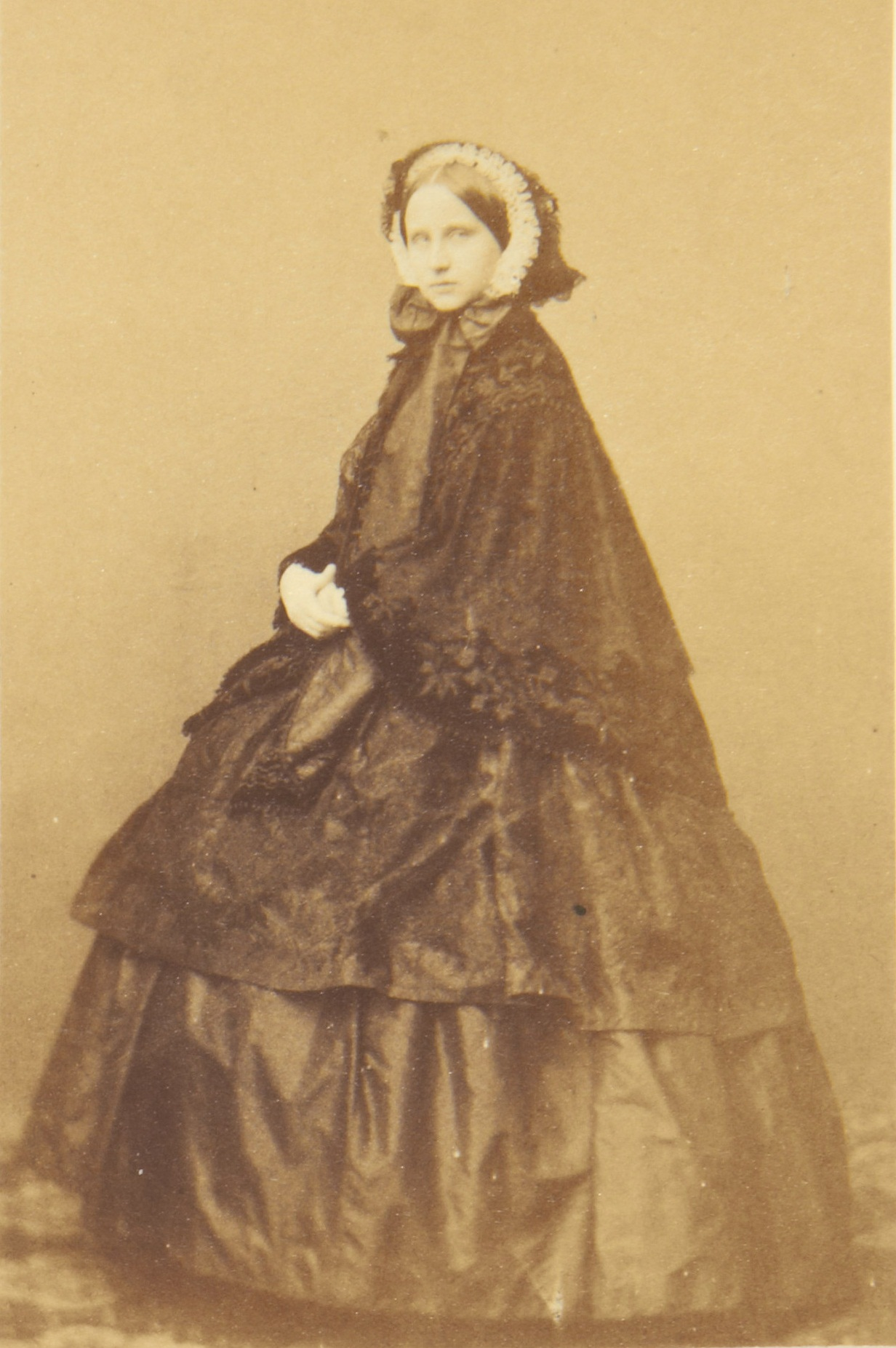
Grand Duchess Louise of Baden, 1860s

Louise was a great friend of Alice, Grand Duchess of Hesse, her sister-in-law's younger sister; i.e., Alice was the sister of Victoria, Louise's brother Frederick William's wife, both sisters being daughters of Queen Victoria. The two often visited each other. In Queen Victoria's letters, she and Frederick were always referred to with pleasure or sympathy as good Fritz and Louise of Baden. Though friends as young girls, Louise and her sister-in-law Victoria, Princess Royal ("Vicky") always had a "none-too-friendly rivalry", particularly when comparing their children: while Vicky's eldest son Crown Prince Wilhelm was born with a deformed arm, Louise apparently could not resist bragging that her three children were healthier and bigger at the same age. Louise doted on her nephew however, and Vicky wrote to her mother that the grand duchess "spoilt him quite dreadfully". Often supporting him against his parents, her and Wilhelm's close relationship would carry on to his adulthood, and he would later write in his memoirs that Louise "possessed considerable political ability and a great gift for organisation, and she understood excellently how to put (the) right men in the right place and how to employ their strength serviceably for the general benefit". He continued that his aunt "learned admirably to combine the Prussian element with the Baden character, and she developed into a model sovereign princess". Louise and Vicky's relations grew even more distant when the former wanted her son Crown Prince Frederick (of Baden) to marry Vicky's niece Princess Elisabeth of Hesse and by Rhine; the princess instead married Grand Duke Sergei Alexandrovich of Russia, and Louise felt her family had been snubbed. However, Vicky's own son, Wilhelm had too been rejected by Elisabeth, which Louise seemed unaware of.

The Austro-Prussian War caused a degree of friction between Baden and Prussia, as the former, despite their close familial connections to Berlin, chose to support the Austrians. As the daughter of the Prussian king, Baden was not included in the list of states forced to pay excessive indemnities to Prussia. Her father's strongly anti-Catholic chancellor Otto von Bismarck disliked Baden however, as it was one of Germany's most important Catholic states; he saw its religion as threatening the stability of the new German Empire. Suspicious of the grand duchess' influence on her father, he did his best to block her request for clemency on behalf of Alsace Catholics to the emperor.

=== Philanthropic activities ===
Because of her status as Grand Duchess, Louise was very involved in her duchy's charitable organizations, particularly issues concerning women. She helped found a welfare charity for women called the Baden Frauenverein, which focused on providing hospitals and homes to children. With the support of the Women's Association, Louise founded the first Badenese housewifery school in Karlsruhe, carrying on Theodor Gottlieb von Hippel the Elder's goal of women receiving special domestic training.

Louise maintained a correspondence with Florence Nightingale, who believed the Grand Duchess' letters could have been written by "any administrator in the Crimean War". The Grand Duchess also had a lifelong friendship with Clara Barton, whom she met during the Franco-Prussian War. They organized military hospitals, and helped found sewing factories for women to aid the war effort; at Louise's suggestion, Barton was awarded the Iron Cross of Merit after the war by recently crowned Emperor Wilhelm.

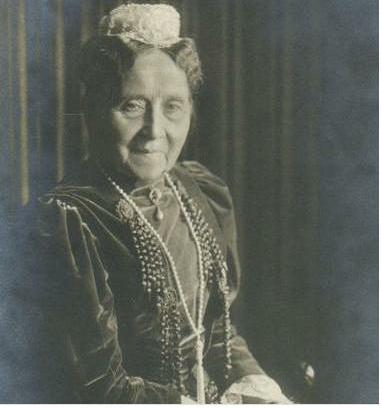
Dowager Grand Duchess of Baden in later life.

Despite her old age, Louise was present to welcome back wounded German soldiers upon their return to Germany from French prison camps.

=== Widowhood ===
Within two years, four of Louise's closest family members died - her father, brother, younger son and mother. Her sister in law Vicky, now the Dowager Empress Frederick, took sympathy on Louise and persuaded her mother, Queen Victoria, to confer the Royal Order of Victoria and Albert, First Class, on her.

Frederick died on 28 September 1907, and their eldest son succeeded as Frederick II. That same year, their only daughter Victoria succeeded as Queen consort of Sweden.

Louise, now Dowager Grand Duchess of Baden, lived to see her duchy become absorbed into the new state of Germany under the Revolution of 1918-19 that took place at the end of World War I. At the time of the revolution, her daughter, Queen Victoria of Sweden, was visiting her. After the abdication of the German emperor, riots broke out in Karlsruhe on 11 November. The son of a courtier led a group of soldiers up to the front of the palace, followed by a great crowd of people, where a few shots were fired. Louise, as well as the rest of the family, left the palace via a backway and fled to the Zwingenberg palace in the Neckar valley. By permission of the new government, they were allowed to stay at the Langenstein Palace, which belonged to a Swedish noble, Count Douglas. During these events, Louise was said to have kept her calm and never uttered a word of complaint. The government gave the order that the former Grand Ducal family was to be protected, and that Langenstein be exempted from housing returning soldiers due to Louise's daughter, the Queen of Sweden being in their company, Baden did not want to do anything to offend Sweden. In 1919, the family requested permission from the government to reside in Mainau. The new German government replied that they were now private citizens and could do as they wished.

The republican government of Germany gave the former Grand Duchess permission to live out the rest of her life in retirement at Baden-Baden, where she died on 24 April 1923. She was the last surviving non-morganatic grandchild of Frederick William III of Prussia.

== Issue ==
Louise and Frederick had three children:

Name	Birth	Death	Notes
Frederick II, Grand Duke of Baden	9 July 1857	9 August 1928	Married Princess Hilda of Luxembourg, no issue.
Princess Sophia Maria Victoria of Baden	7 August 1862	4 April 1930	Married King Gustaf V of Sweden, had issue.
Prince Ludwig Wilhelm Karl Friedrich of Baden	12 June 1865	23 February 1888	Died unmarried, no issue.

== Legacy ==
Grand Duchess Maria Pavlovna, who married Louise's grandson Vilhelm in 1908, described Princess Louise in her memoirs:

"She was an old lady who combined strict principles and an iron will with great intelligence and an extraordinarily wide range of interests. Despite my extreme youth she treated me always with a consideration which astonished me. [...] Her devotion to the family was remarkable, and so was her insatiable interest in all that concerned it. For hours at a time she would question me about distant relatives in Russia known to her only by name. The least detail of their lives interested her. This solicitude extended also to the dead, who seemed still to hold the same place in her life as they had done before. Her bedroom, which she invited me to visit one day, was hung with photographs of kings, queens, princes, and princesses, on their death beds."

== Honours ==
Decorations and awards

- Kingdom of Prussia:
  - Dame of the Order of Louise, 1st Division
  - Dame of the Wilhelm-Orden
  - Cross of Merit for Women and Girls
  - Red Cross Medal, 1st Class, 22 October 1898
  - Kaiser Wilhelm Memorial Medal
- Baden:
  - Princess' Cross of the House Order of Fidelity, in Diamonds
  - Memorial Cross for 1870/71
  - Friedrich-Luise Medal
  - Jubilee Medal for 1902
  - Commemorative Medal for the Golden Jubilee of Grand Duke Friedrich I and Grand Duchess Luise
- Kingdom of Bavaria:
  - Cross of Merit for 1870/71
  - Dame of Honour of the Order of Theresa
  - Cross of Merit for Voluntary Nursing
- Kingdom of Saxony: Dame of the Order of Sidonia, 1871
- Württemberg: Dame of the Order of Olga, 1871
- Sovereign Military Order of Malta: Dame of Honour and Devotion
- Netherlands: Dame of Honour of the House Order of Orange
- Ottoman Empire: Dame Grand Cordon of the Order of Charity, in Diamonds
- Beylik of Tunis: Husainid House Order in Diamonds
- Kingdom of Portugal: Dame of the Order of Queen Saint Isabel
- Kingdom of Romania: Decoration of the Cross of Queen Elisabeth for 1877/78
- Russian Empire: Grand Cross of St. Catherine, in Diamonds
- Spain: Dame of the Order of Queen Maria Luisa, 5 June 1879
- United Kingdom:
  - Royal Order of Victoria and Albert, 1st Class in Diamonds, January 1890
  - Honorary Lady of Justice of St. John

Honorary military appointments

- Honorary colonel of the Augusta Grenadier Guards

== Ancestry ==
Ancestors of Princess Louise of Prussia

8. Frederick William II of Prussia
4. Frederick William III of Prussia
9. Princess Frederica Louisa of Hesse-Darmstadt
2. Wilhelm I, German Emperor
10. Charles II, Grand Duke of Mecklenburg-Strelitz
5. Duchess Louise of Mecklenburg-Strelitz
11. Princess Friederike of Hesse-Darmstadt
1. Princess Louise of Prussia
12. Charles Augustus, Grand Duke of Saxe-Weimar-Eisenach
6. Charles Frederick, Grand Duke of Saxe-Weimar-Eisenach
13. Princess Louise of Hesse-Darmstadt
3. Princess Augusta of Saxe-Weimar-Eisenach
14. Paul I of Russia
7. Grand Duchess Maria Pavlovna of Russia
15. Duchess Sophie Dorothea of Wurttemberg

Princess Louise of Prussia House of Hohenzollern Born: 3 December 1838 Died: 3 December 1838
German royalty
Preceded by Princess Sophie of Sweden	Grand Duchess consort of Baden; 20 September 1856 – 28 September 1907	Succeeded by Princess Hilda of Nassau
