= House Order of Fidelity =

Baden Order of Knighthood

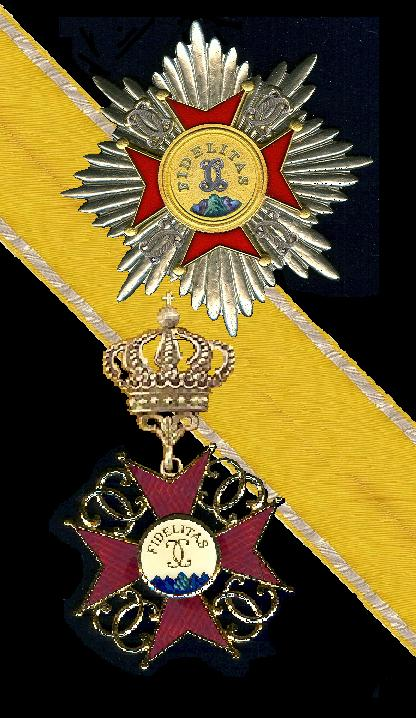
- Star, badge and ribbon of the order

Awarded by the Grand Duchy of Baden
- Type: State order
- Motto: FIDELITAS
- Sovereign: Prince Bernhard
- Grades: Knight Grand Cross; Knight Commander; Knight
- Ribbon of the order

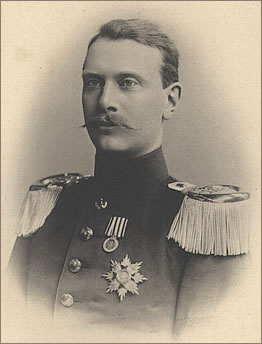
Frederick II, Grand Duke of Baden with the star of the order.

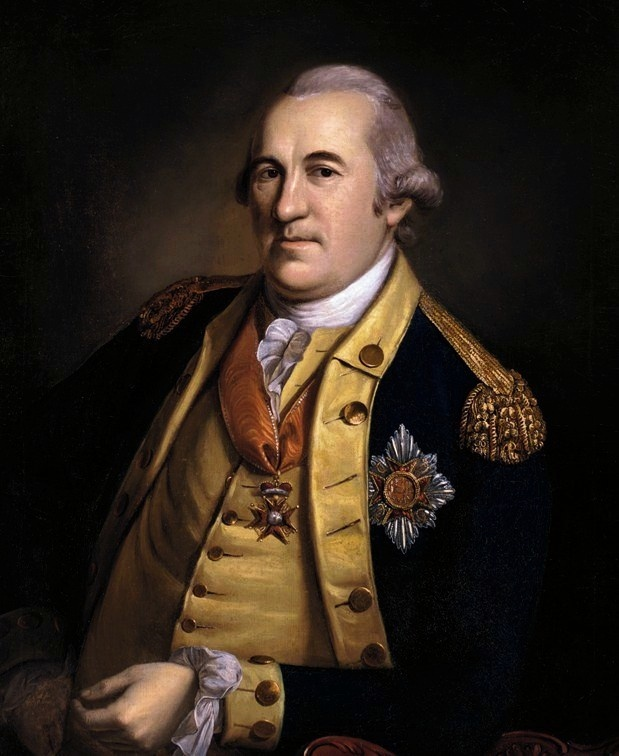
Friedrich Wilhelm von Steuben (1730–1794) wearing the order.

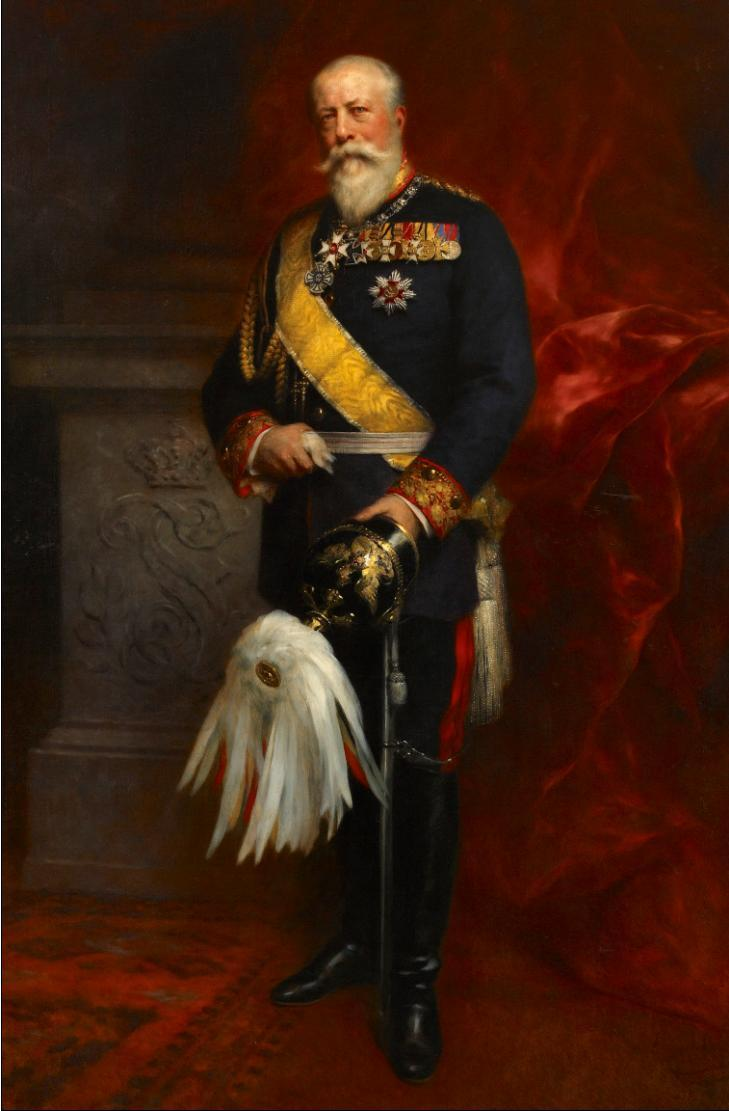
Frederick I, Grand Duke of Baden in 1900, with the order's sash and star.

The House Order of Fidelity (German: Hausorden der Treue) is a dynastic order of the Margraviate of Baden. It was established by Charles III William, Margrave of Baden-Durlach as a reward for merit and to mark the laying of the foundation stone of his residence at Karlsruhe Palace. As was customary at that time, it was originally named in French as the Ordre de la Fidélité, before later being renamed the Orden der Treue and finally in 1840 the Hausorden der Treue. Its motto was Fidelitas (Latin for "Fidelity"), which is also part of Karlsruhe, Germany's coat of arms.

== History ==
The order was founded at the building site of Karlsruhe Palace on 17 June 1715 and later the same day, the palace's foundation stone was laid – this was also the city of Karlsruhe's foundation date. In the city's early years until around 1732, the city's main streets were named after knights of the order, at the suggestion of one of the founding knights and one of the obervogts or city guards, Johann Christian von Günzer, who also suggested that Fidelitas be used on the city's coat of arms.

On 8 May 1803, Charles Frederick, Margrave of Baden added the class of Commander to the order. After Baden was promoted to a Grand Duchy in 1806, it became one of Baden's highest orders. From 1814, it returned to being a single-class order.

From 17 January 1840, it was made the highest order in Baden and renamed the Hausorden der Treue. By a statute of 17 June 1840, it was expanded back into two classes and reserved for princes of the grand ducal house, foreign sovereigns and higher statesmen with the title of "Excellency".

In 1902, the Princess Cross class was added, which was reserved for princesses born in the grand ducal house or who had married into it. Even after the monarchies of Germany were abolished, it was awarded as a dynastic order by the House of Baden.

== Classes ==
- Grand Cross
- Commander
- Princess Cross

== Insignia ==
=== Star ===
Its star consists of an eight-point Maltese cross with small golden balls on its tips, gold "C"s (after its founder) in the corners and a suspension loop attached to a crown on the top arm of the cross. The shield on the centre is gold plated with white enamel showing three green mountains below three gold "C"s and the motto FIDELITAS. The rear of the gold shield shows the arms of Baden and a red fess.

=== Badge ===
This is a silver eight-arm cross, with an orange medallion on the front and four gold double "C"s on the silver arms.

=== Sash ===
This is orange with a narrow silver stripe down each side. It is worn over the right shoulder and left hip. On its left side is a gap for the badge.

== Recipients ==
When the Order of Fidelity was reserved for foreign sovereigns, members of the ruling house and princes, the concurrent award of the Order of the Zähringer Lion continued until 1877. After that date, the Grand Cross of the Order of Berthold the First was awarded first instead.

=== Distribution ===
The number of distributions before the end of the German monarchies (not including awards to members of the grand ducal house) were:

Form	Ceremonies
Order in diamonds with gold chain	2
Order in diamonds	4
Star in diamonds	4
Grand Cross	414
Commander with Star	18
Commander	6
Princess-Decoration	8

The following were awarded the order in diamonds:

Year	Recipients	Form
1815	Klemens Fürst von Metternich	Star
1818	Wilhelm Ludwig Leopold Reinhard Freiherr von Berstett	Cross
1863	Alexander Michailowitsch Gortschakow	Cross
1863	Wladimir Fjodorowitsch Adlerberg	Cross
1871	Otto von Bismarck	Cross with gold chain
1896	Adolf von Holzing-Berstett	Star
1902	Adolf von Holzing-Berstett	Cross with gold chain
1902	Wilhelm Pleikard Ludwig von Gemmingen	Star
1902	Wilhelm August von Edelsheim	Star
1907	Max von Bock und Polach	Star

== Bibliography (in German) ==
- Moritz Ruhl: Die Orden, Wappen und Flaggen aller Regenten und Staaten. Leipzig 1884. Nachdruck: Offenbach am Main 1998, ISBN 3-932543-73-4.
- Maximilian Gritzner: Handbuch der Ritter- und Verdienstorden aller Kulturstaaten der Welt. Leipzig 1893, ISBN 3-8262-0705-X.
- Arnhard Graf Klenau: Orden in Deutschland und Österreich. Band II. Graf Klenau Verlag, Offenbach 2008, ISBN 3-937064-13-3.
- Lars Adler: Die Ordensstiftungen der Markgrafen von Baden 1584–1803: adlige Korporationen im Spiegel fürstlicher Landespolitik. („Phaleristische Monographien“, Band 5), with a foreword by Bernhard, Hereditary Prince of Baden. Konstanz 2008, ISBN 3-937064-07-9.
- derselbe: Friedrich Wilhelm von Steuben als Ritter des Markgräflich badischen Ordens der Treue: der Fall einer durch Adelsanmaßung erlangten Ordensmitgliedschaft im 18. Jahrhundert. In: Herold-Jahrbuch des Herold, Verein für Heraldik, Genealogie und Verwandte Wissenschaften. N.F., 11. Band (2006). ISBN 3-7686-3081-1, ISBN 978-3-7686-3081-8, S. 9–32.
- derselbe: Ordenspokal und Temperantiabecher. Gläsergarnitur des badischen Fidelitasordens. In: Orden und Ehrenzeichen. herausgegeben von der Deutschen Gesellschaft für Ordenskunde e. V. 10. Jahrgang (2008). Heft Nr. 54, April 2008, S. 74–80.
- Hof- und Staats-Handbuch des Grossherzogthums Baden, 1841 Statuten und Liste der Ordensträger in der Google-Buchsuche
