= Ernst Gottmann =

German photographer (1874–1932)

- Born: 7 August 1874; Heidelberg, Grand Duchy of Baden, German Empire
- Died: 30 May 1932 (aged 57); Heidelberg, Republic of Baden, Germany
- Spouse: Lina Schellmann (m. 1899)
- Children: 1

Ernst Gottmann (7 August 1874 – 30 May 1932) was a German photographer who operated a photography company in Heidelberg. His photography focused on portraiture and architecture. Gottmann handed over his business to his son in 1928, and it remained in the family until the 1970s. A cache of their photographs was discovered in 1975 and featured in a 1980 exhibition in Heidelberg.

== Life ==
Ernst Gottmann was born on 7 August 1874. Fifteen years later, in 1889, he began taking photographs at Hauptstrasse 100. He began photographing locally prominent people six years later. In 1899, he married Lina Schellmann. In 1901, he founded the Heidelberger Fachphotographen-Vereinigung, a photography company, in Heidelberg. When Heidelberg University was being built from 1904 to 1905, he photographed the building progress. A year later, he moved to Bienenstrasse 6 and moved his business into that house. In 1907, he was recognised by Frederick II, Grand Duke of Baden as having been "Hofwürdigkeit". In July 1912, he organised the Allgemeine Deutsche Photographische Ausstellung zu Heidelberg. While at this event, Frederick II inducted him into the Order of the Zähringer Lion and the Friedrich Order.

In his photography company, he specialised in taking portrait photographs of the local bourgeoisie. He personally knew the local figures in this class and they liked him. His other specialisation was in architectural photography, including the photographs of the construction of Heidelberg University. These photographs have come to be known as the "Gottmann'sche Tafeln". In 1928, he founded the Schlossphotographie photography company, which specialised in taking photographs of people in front of historic areas. His son, also named Ernst Gottmann, took over the main business in that year. Gottmann died on 30 May 1932.

== Business and legacy ==
His main photography business remained in the Gottmann family until 1971, while Schlossphotographie remained under family management until 1977 or 1978. In 1975, a collection of negatives was discovered in the basement of their old studio by a pair of architects. This cache included over 20,000 photographs of local people and architecture. After they were prepared by local art history students, they were exhibited in Heidelberg from 6 January to 27 February 1980. The purpose of the exhibition was to connect with the parts of the city that had been destroyed since the photographs were taken. 9022 people visited it, provoking a debate on the redevelopment of the city.

== General and cited sources ==
- "1980: Die Ausstellung: 'Beruf: Photograph in Heidelberg'". Heidelberger Kunstverein (in German). Archived from the original on 25 July 2023.
- "Kurze Nachrichten aus Baden". Karlsruher Zeitung (in German). 30 May 1932. p. 3 – via Deutsches Zeitungsportal.
- Schubart, Peter (1980). "'Beruf: Photograph in Heidelberg Ernst Gottmann sen. und jun. 1895 — 1955'. Zur Ausstellung im Heidelberger Kunstverein". Denkmalpflege in Baden-Württemberg – Nachrichtenblatt der Landesdenkmalpflege (in German). 9 (2): 74–75. doi:10.11588/nbdpfbw.1980.2.14284. ISSN 0465-7519.
- "Lebenslauf Ernst Gottmann". University of Heidelberg (in German). 13 September 2022. Archived from the original on 30 June 2023.
