= Frederick I, Grand Duke of Baden =

Grand Duke of Baden from 1858 to 1907

Frederick I
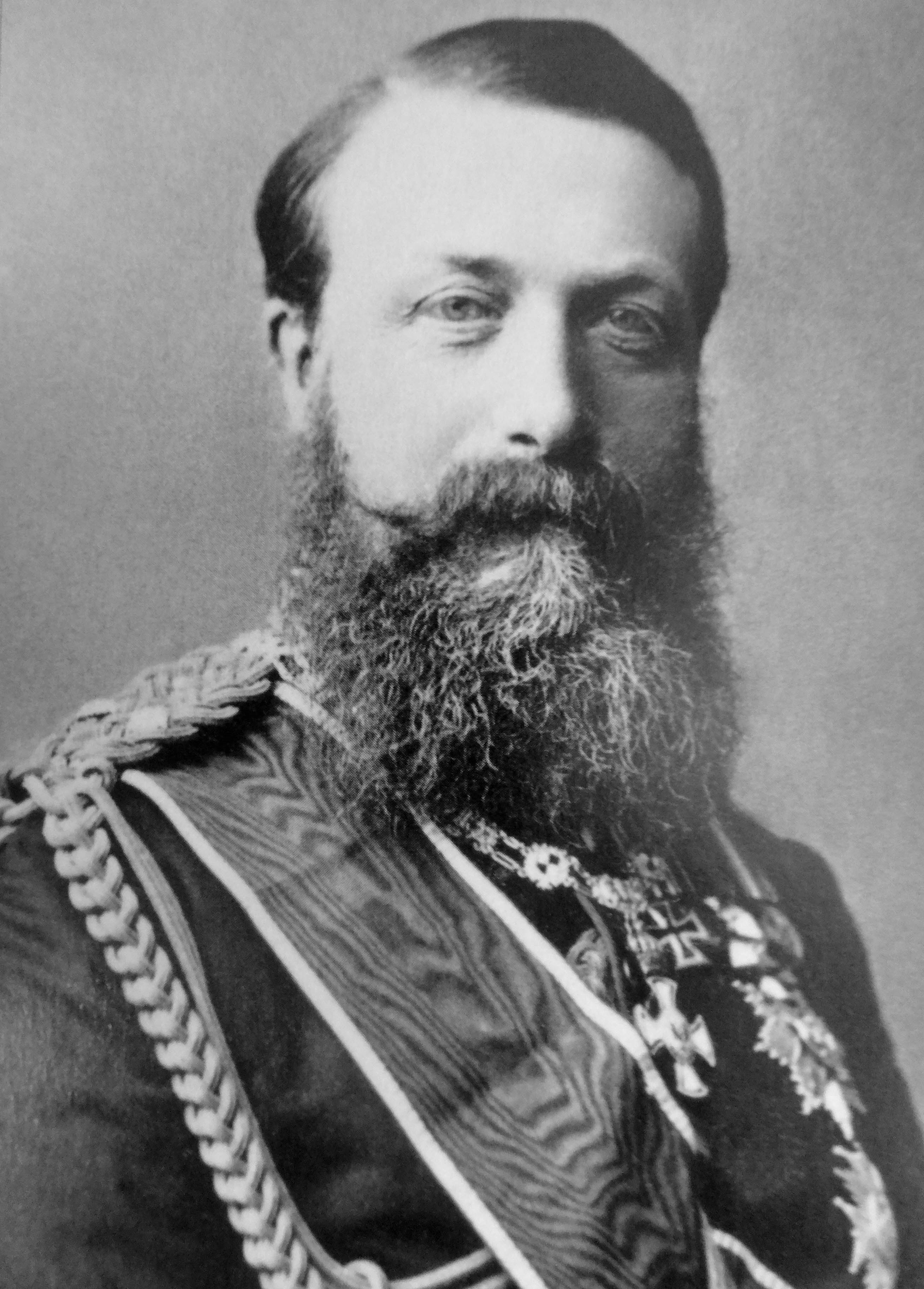

Grand Duke of Baden
- Reign: 23 January 1858 – 28 September 1907
- Predecessor: Louis II
- Successor: Frederick II
- Born: 9 September 1826; Karlsruhe, Grand Duchy of Baden, German Confederation
- Died: 28 September 1907 (aged 81); Mainau, Grand Duchy of Baden, German Empire
- Spouse: Princess Louise of Prussia (m. 1856)
- Issue Detail: Frederick II, Grand Duke of Baden; Victoria, Queen of Sweden; Prince Louis of Baden
Names
- Frederick William Louis; German: Friedrich Wilhelm Ludwig
- House: Zähringen
- Father: Leopold, Grand Duke of Baden
- Mother: Princess Sophie of Sweden

Frederick I (German: Friedrich Wilhelm Ludwig; 9 September 1826 – 28 September 1907) was the Grand Duke of Baden from 1858 to 1907.

== Life ==
Frederick was born in Karlsruhe, Baden, on 9 September 1826. He was the third son of Leopold, Grand Duke of Baden and Princess Sophie of Sweden. He became the heir presumptive to the grand duchy upon the death of his father in 1852 and the accession of his brother as Grand Duke Louis II. Due to his brother's mental ill-health, he was regent ad interim of Baden in 1852–1855, and took the title of grand duke in 1856. His brother, Louis II, died in 1858. He was considered a relatively liberal supporter of a constitutional monarchy. During his reign the option of civil marriages was introduced in Baden as well as direct elections to the Lower House of the Parliament of Baden in 1904.

In 1856, Frederick married Princess Louise, daughter of Prince Wilhelm of Prussia and Princess Augusta of Saxe-Weimar-Eisenach. The couple had three children.

Frederick I had a pivotal role in the history of Zionism. In 1896 he met Theodor Herzl (the founder of political Zionism) via their mutual acquaintance the reverend William Hechler, and helped Herzl in obtaining an audience with his nephew Wilhelm II, German Emperor. After some persuasion on the part of the grand duke, the emperor accepted the appeal for an audience. It took place in Palestine on 2 November 1898, during the emperor's visit to inaugurate the Church of the Redeemer, Jerusalem.

Frederick I was present at the proclamation of the German Empire at Versailles in 1871, as he was the only son-in-law of Prussian King Wilhelm I and one of the reigning sovereigns of Germany. He loudly shouted, "His Majesty, Emperor Wilhelm!" He died at his summer residence at the island of Mainau in southern Germany on 28 September 1907. Today, Mainau is owned by the Lennart Bernadotte Foundation, created by Frederick's great-grandson Count Lennart Bernadotte, (1909–2004).

== Issue ==
- Grand Duke Frederick II of Baden (9 July 1857 – 9 August 1928), married Princess Hilda of Nassau; no issue
- Queen Victoria of Sweden (7 August 1862 – 4 April 1930), married King Gustav V of Sweden; had issue
- Prince Louis of Baden (12 June 1865 – 23 February 1888), died unmarried; no issue

== Honours ==
German honours

- Baden:
  - Knight of the House Order of Fidelity
  - Grand Cross of the Military Karl-Friedrich Merit Order
  - Grand Cross of the Zähringer Lion
  - Founder of the Order of Berthold the First, 29 April 1877
  - Memorial Cross for the Campaign of 1870/71
  - Service Cross for Officers (25 years)
- Anhalt: Grand Cross of the Order of Albert the Bear, 1889
- Bavaria: Knight of St. Hubert, 1852
- Brunswick: Grand Cross of the Order of Henry the Lion
- (Saxe-Coburg and Gotha) (Duchy of Saxe-Altenburg) (Saxe-Meiningen) Ernestine duchies: Grand Cross of the Saxe-Ernestine House Order, September 1844
- Hanover:
  - Knight of St. George, 1855
  - Grand Cross of the Royal Guelphic Order, 1855
- (Grand Duchy of Hesse) Hesse and by Rhine: Grand Cross of the Ludwig Order, 24 September 1843
- (Hohenzollern-Sigmaringen) Hohenzollern: Cross of Honour of the Princely House Order of Hohenzollern, 1st Class
- Mecklenburg:
  - Grand Cross of the Wendish Crown, with Collar
  - Military Merit Cross, 1st Class (Schwerin)
- Nassau: Knight of the Gold Lion of Nassau, June 1860
- Oldenburg: Grand Cross of the Order of Duke Peter Friedrich Ludwig, with Golden Crown, 17 May 1852
- Prussia:
  - Knight of the Black Eagle, 25 September 1851; with Collar, 1856
  - Knight of the Red Eagle, 1st Class
  - Grand Commander's Cross of the Royal House Order of Hohenzollern, 9 November 1861
  - Iron Cross (1870), 2nd Class
  - War Commemorative Medal of 1870/71
  - Kaiser Wilhelm Memorial Medal
- Saxe-Weimar-Eisenach: Grand Cross of the White Falcon, 6 August 1853
- Saxony: Knight of the Rue Crown, 1853
- Schaumburg-Lippe: Military Merit Medal
- Württemberg: Grand Cross of the Württemberg Crown, 1846

Foreign honours

- Austria:
  - Grand Cross of the Royal Hungarian Order of St. Stephen, 1849
  - Service Cross for Officers (25 years)
- Belgium: Grand Cordon of the Order of Leopold, 12 May 1845
- Brazil: Grand Cross of the Southern Cross
- Denmark: Knight of the Elephant, 24 April 1877
- France: Grand Cross of the Legion of Honour, September 1846
- Greece: Grand Cross of the Redeemer
- Hawaii: Grand Cross of the Royal Order of Kamehameha I
- Italy: Knight of the Annunciation, with Collar, 9 November 1864
  - Tuscany: Grand Cross of St. Joseph
  - Two Sicilies: Grand Cross of St. Ferdinand and Merit
- Japan: Grand Cordon of the Supreme Order of the Chrysanthemum, 5 June 1906
- Monaco: Grand Cross of St. Charles, 19 October 1869
- Montenegro: Grand Cross of the Order of Prince Danilo I
- Netherlands:
  - Grand Cross of the Netherlands Lion
  - Grand Cross of the Military William Order, 17 July 1878
- Portugal:
  - Grand Cross of the Sash of the Three Orders
  - Grand Cross of the Tower and Sword, with Collar
- Romania:
  - Grand Cross of the Star of Romania
  - Grand Cross of the Order of Carol I, with Collar, 1906
- Russia:
  - Knight of St. Andrew, with Golden Collar
  - Knight of St. Alexander Nevsky
  - Knight of the White Eagle
  - Knight of St. Anna, 1st Class
  - Cross of St. George
- Serbia:
  - Order of Miloš the Great, 1st Class
  - Grand Cross of the Cross of Takovo
- Sweden-Norway:
  - Knight of the Seraphim, with Collar, 15 April 1877
  - Grand Cross of St. Olav, 20 September 1881
  - Commander Grand Cross of the Order of Vasa, with Collar, 1896
- Spain:
  - Grand Cross of the Order of Charles III, 27 May 1866
  - Knight of the Golden Fleece, with Collar, December 1878
- (Thailand) Siam: Knight of the Order of the Royal House of Chakri, with Collar, 5 October 1897
- Tunisia: Husainid House Order, in Diamonds
- United Kingdom: Stranger Knight Companion of the Garter, 20 September 1906

== Ancestry ==
Ancestors of Frederick I, Grand Duke of Baden

8. Frederick, Hereditary Prince of Baden-Durlach
4. Charles Frederick, Grand Duke of Baden
9. Princess Amalia of Nassau-Dietz
2. Leopold, Grand Duke of Baden
10. Ludwig Heinrich, Baron Geyer of Geyersberg
5. Baroness Louise Caroline Geyer of Geyersberg
11. Countess Maximiliana Christiane of Sponeck
1. Frederick I, Grand Duke of Baden
12. Gustav III of Sweden
6. Gustav IV Adolf of Sweden
13. Sophia Magdalena of Denmark
3. Princess Sophie of Sweden
14. Charles Louis, Hereditary Prince of Baden
7. Frederica of Baden
15. Landgravine Amalie of Hesse-Darmstadt

== Footnotes ==
Frederick I, Grand Duke of Baden House of Zähringen Born: 9 September 1826 Died: 28 September 1907
German royalty
Preceded by Louis II	Grand Duke of Baden; 1856–1907	Succeeded by Frederick II
