= Frederick II of Baden =

Grand Duke of Baden from 1907 to 1918

Frederick II
- Grand Duke Frederick II in 1915

Grand Duke of Baden
- Reign: 28 September 1907 – 22 November 1918
- Predecessor: Frederick I
- Successor: Monarchy abolished
- Born: 9 July 1857; Karlsruhe, Grand Duchy of Baden
- Died: 9 August 1928 (aged 71); Badenweiler, Weimar Republic
- Spouse: Princess Hilda of Nassau (m. 1885)
Names
- Friedrich Wilhelm Ludwig Leopold August
- House: Zähringen
- Father: Frederick I, Grand Duke of Baden
- Mother: Princess Louise of Prussia

Frederick II (9 July 1857 – 9 August 1928; German: Friedrich II. Großherzog von Baden) was the last sovereign Grand Duke of Baden, reigning from 1907 until the abolition of the German monarchies in 1918. The Weimar-era state of Baden originated from the area of the Grand Duchy of Baden. He was a first cousin of Wilhelm II, a second cousin of Alexander III of Russia, and an uncle of Gustaf VI Adolf.

== Life ==
Friedrich "Fritz" Wilhelm Ludwig Leopold August Prinz von Baden was born on 9 July 1857, in Karlsruhe in the Grand Duchy of Baden to Frederick I, Grand Duke of Baden and Princess Louise of Prussia.

As a student at the University of Heidelberg, Frederick was a member of the Suevia Corps, a student fraternal organization. On 20 September 1885 in Schloss Hohenburg, he married Princess Hilda of Nassau, the only daughter of the exiled Duke Adolphe of Nassau who later succeeded as Grand Duke of Luxembourg. There was no surviving issue from the marriage. Frederick became the head of the House of Zähringen on 28 September 1907, after the death of his father Frederick I, who was the sovereign grand duke of Baden reigning from 1856 to 1907. He abdicated on 22 November 1918, amidst the tumults of the German Revolution of 1918–1919 which resulted in the abolition of the grand duchy. After the death of his cousin Carola of Vasa, he became the representative of the descent of the Kings of Sweden of the House of Holstein-Gottorp.

== Military career ==
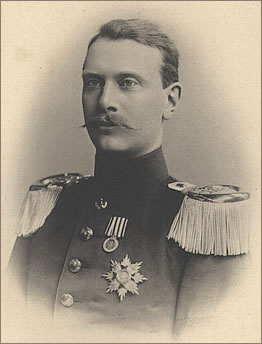
Grand Duke Friedrich as a staff officer

In October 1880, Frederick joined the Prussian Army as a soldier in the 1st Regiment of Foot Guards (1. Garde-Regiment zu Fuß) Potsdam. After his marriage in 1885, he was transferred to the 5th Baden Infantry Regiment No. 113 (5. Badisches Infanterie-Regiment Nr. 113) in Freiburg im Breisgau. He took command of the regiment on 22 March 1889. The regiment's barracks were later named after him as the Erbgroßherzog-Friedrich-Kaserne. Friedrich served in Berlin from 1891 to 1893 as commander of the 4th Guards Infantry Brigade. On 11 April 1893, he was named commander of the 29th Division in Freiburg. On 27 January 1897, Kaiser Wilhelm II appointed him commanding general of the VIII Army Corps (VIII. Armeekorps) in Koblenz, where he was garrisoned until 1901. While in Koblenz, Paul von Hindenburg, among others, served as Chief of the General Staff under Friedrich's command.

In 1902, Frederick left active army service because, as hereditary Grand Duke, he was expected to support the aging Grand Duke Frederick I in Karlsruhe and Kaiser Wilhelm II had refused his request to take command of the XIV Army Corps, which was headquartered in Baden and comprised the majority of Baden's contingent of the Prussian Army, for functional reasons.

After leaving active military service, Frederick was promoted to Generaloberst (Colonel General) with the rank of Generalfeldmarschall (Field Marshal). On 7 October 1907, he succeeded his father in the largely ceremonial position of Generalinpekteur (General Inspector) of the V Army Inspectorate in Karlsruhe. On mobilization at the end of July 1914, the V Army Inspectorate formed the core of the 7th Army, but command was passed to Generaloberst Josias von Heeringen, and for health reasons Grand Duke Frederick II was unable to serve again during the First World War.

Friedrich held the following ranks during his military career:

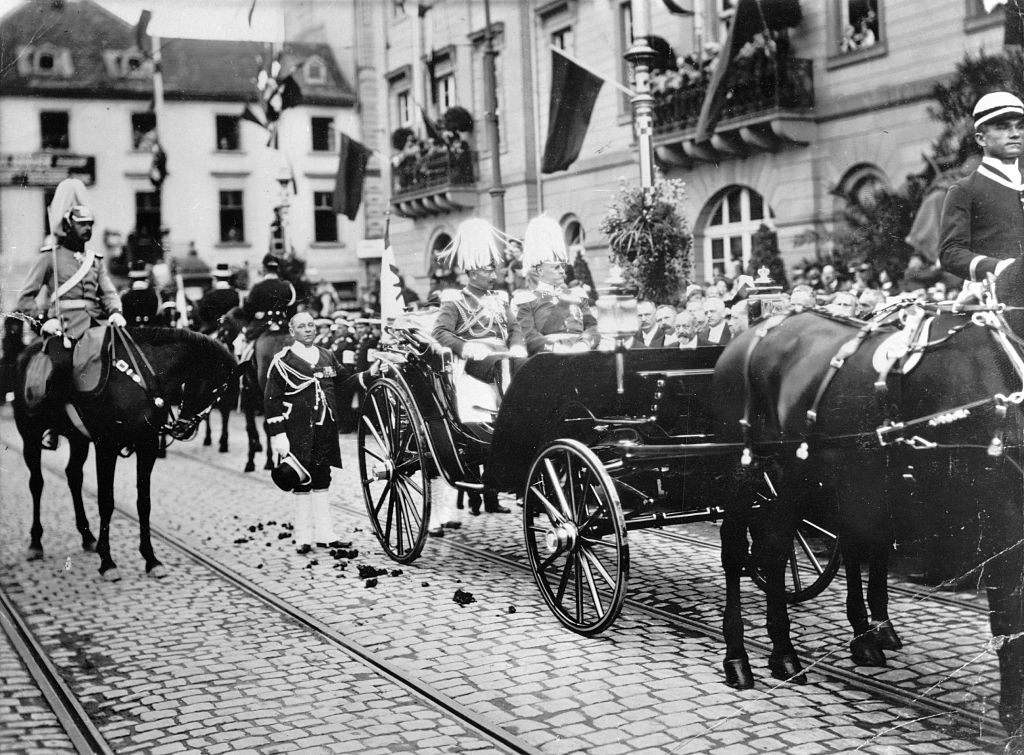
Frederick II with Wilhelm II in 1908

- 1875 : Sekondelieutenant (Leutnant)
- 1881 : Premierlieutenant (Oberleutnant)
- 1882 : Hauptmann
- 1884 : Major
- 1889 : Oberst
- 1891 : Generalmajor
- 1893 : Generalleutnant
- 1897 : General der Infanterie
- 1905 : Generaloberst with the rank of Generalfeldmarschall

== Death ==
After his death in 1928, the headship of the house was transferred over to his first cousin who was the last Chancellor of Imperial Germany, Prince Maximilian of Baden.

== Honorary titles ==
- Chief of the 5th Baden Infantry Regiment No. 113 (5. Badisches Infanterie-Regiment Nr. 113), 22 March 1891.
- Chief of the 1st Baden Life Guard Grenadier Regiment No. 109 (1. Badisches Leib-Grenadier-Regiment Nr. 109), 28 September 1907.
- Chief of the 1st Baden Life Guard Dragoon Regiment No. 20 (1. Badisches Leib-Dragoner-Regiment Nr. 20), 28 September 1907.
- Chief 1st Baden Field Artillery Regiment "Grand Duke" No. 14 (Feldartillerie-Regiment Großherzog (1. Badisches) Nr. 14), 7 October 1907
- Inhaber of the Bavarian 8th Infantry Regiment "Grand Duke Friedrich II of Baden" (Königlich Bayerisches 8. Infanterie-Regiment „Großherzog Friedrich II. von Baden“), 1907.
- Chief of the 8th Württemberg Infantry Regiment "Grand Duke Friedrich of Baden" No. 126 (Infanterie-Regiment „Großherzog Friedrich von Baden“ (8. Württembergisches) Nr. 126), 16 July 1908.
- Chief of the Saxon 4th Infantry Regiment No. 103 (Königlich Sächsisches 4. Infanterie-Regiment Nr. 103), 17 October 1908.
- À la suite of the Prussian 1st Regiment of Foot Guards (1. Garde-Regiment zu Fuß), 20 October 1883.
- À la suite of the Prussian 1st Guards Uhlan Regiment (1. Garde-Ulanen-Regiment), 18 October 1884.
- À la suite of the Imperial Navy 1st Sea Battalion (I. Seebataillon)
- Honorary General of the Swedish Army, 1906

== Decorations and awards ==
German orders and decorations

- Baden:
  - Knight of the House Order of Fidelity
  - Knight of the Order of Berthold the First
  - Friedrich-Luise Medal
  - Jubilee Medal for 1902
  - Commemorative Medal for the Golden Jubilee of Grand Duke Friedrich I and Grand Duchess Luise
- Anhalt: Grand Cross of the Order of Albert the Bear, 1889
- Bavaria:
  - Knight of St. Hubert, 1885
  - Military Merit Order, Grand Cross with Swords (16 August 1915)
- Brunswick: Grand Cross of the Order of Henry the Lion
- (Saxe-Coburg and Gotha) (Duchy of Saxe-Altenburg) (Saxe-Meiningen) Ernestine duchies: Grand Cross of the Saxe-Ernestine House Order, 1879
- (Grand Duchy of Hesse) Hesse and by Rhine: Grand Cross of the Ludwig Order, 29 December 1874
- Mecklenburg-Schwerin:
  - House Order of the Wendish Crown, Grand Cross with Crown in Ore (1877)
  - House Order of the Wendish Crown, Grand Cross with Crown in Ore with Collar (1912)
  - Military Merit Cross 1st and 2nd Class (1916)
- Nassau: Knight of the Gold Lion of Nassau
- Oldenburg: Grand Cross of Honour of the Order of Duke Peter Friedrich Ludwig
- Saxe-Weimar-Eisenach: Grand Cross of the White Falcon, 1877
- Saxony: Knight of the Rue Crown
- Schaumburg-Lippe: Cross of Honour of the House Order of Lippe, 1st Class
- Waldeck-Pyrmont: Cross of Merit, 1st Class
- Württemberg: Grand Cross of the Württemberg Crown, 1875
- Prussia:
  - Knight of the Black Eagle, 9 July 1875; with Collar, 1877
  - Grand Cross of the Red Eagle
  - Grand Commander's Cross of the Royal House Order of Hohenzollern
  - Iron Cross (1914), 1st and 2nd Class
  - Officer's Service Decoration Cross
  - Kaiser Wilhelm Memorial Medal
  - Commemorative Medal for the Silver Wedding of Kaiser Wilhelm II and Empress Augusta, 27 February 1906
- (Hohenzollern-Sigmaringen) Hohenzollern: Cross of Honour of the Princely House Order of Hohenzollern, 1st Class

Foreign orders and decorations

- (Austrian Empire) (Kingdom of Hungary) Austria-Hungary:
  - Grand Cross of the Royal Hungarian Order of St. Stephen, 1885
  - Military Jubilee Cross, 14 August 1908
- Belgium: Grand Cordon of the Order of Leopold
- Empire of Brazil: Grand Cross of the Southern Cross
- Denmark: Knight of the Elephant, 13 October 1897
- Kingdom of Italy: Knight of the Annunciation, 10 September 1897
- Netherlands: Grand Cross of the Netherlands Lion
- Kingdom of Romania:
  - Grand Cross of the Order of Carol I, with Collar
  - Grand Cross of the Star of Romania
- Russian Empire: Knight of St. Andrew
- Sweden-Norway:
  - Knight of the Seraphim, with Collar, 20 September 1881
  - Grand Cross of St. Olav, 27 September 1897
- United Kingdom: Honorary Grand Cross of the Royal Victorian Order, 16 June 1905

== Ancestry ==
Ancestors of Frederick II of Baden

8. Charles Frederick, Grand Duke of Baden
4. Leopold, Grand Duke of Baden
9. Baroness Louise Caroline Geyer of Geyersberg
2. Frederick I, Grand Duke of Baden
10. Gustav IV Adolf, King of Sweden
5. Princess Sophie of Sweden
11. Princess Frederica of Baden
Frederick II, Grand Duke of Baden
12. Frederick William III, King of Prussia
6. Wilhelm I, German Emperor
13. Duchess Louise of Mecklenburg-Strelitz
3. Princess Louise of Prussia
14. Charles Frederick, Grand Duke of Saxe-Weimar-Eisenach
7. Princess Augusta of Saxe-Weimar-Eisenach
15. Grand Duchess Maria Pavlovna of Russia

Frederick II of Baden House of Zähringen Born: 9 July 1857 Died: 9 August 1928
German royalty
Preceded by Frederick I	Grand Duke of Baden; 28 September 1907 – 22 November 1918	Monarchy abolished German Revolution
Political offices
Preceded by Frederick I as grand duke	Head of state of Baden; 28 September 1907 – 22 November 1918	Succeeded by Anton Geiß as president
Titles in pretence
Loss of title Republic declared	— TITULAR — Grand Duke of Baden; 22 November 1918 – 9 August 1928	Succeeded by Maximilian
