= Princess Hilda of Nassau =

Grand Duchess of Baden from 1907 to 1918

Hilda of Nassau
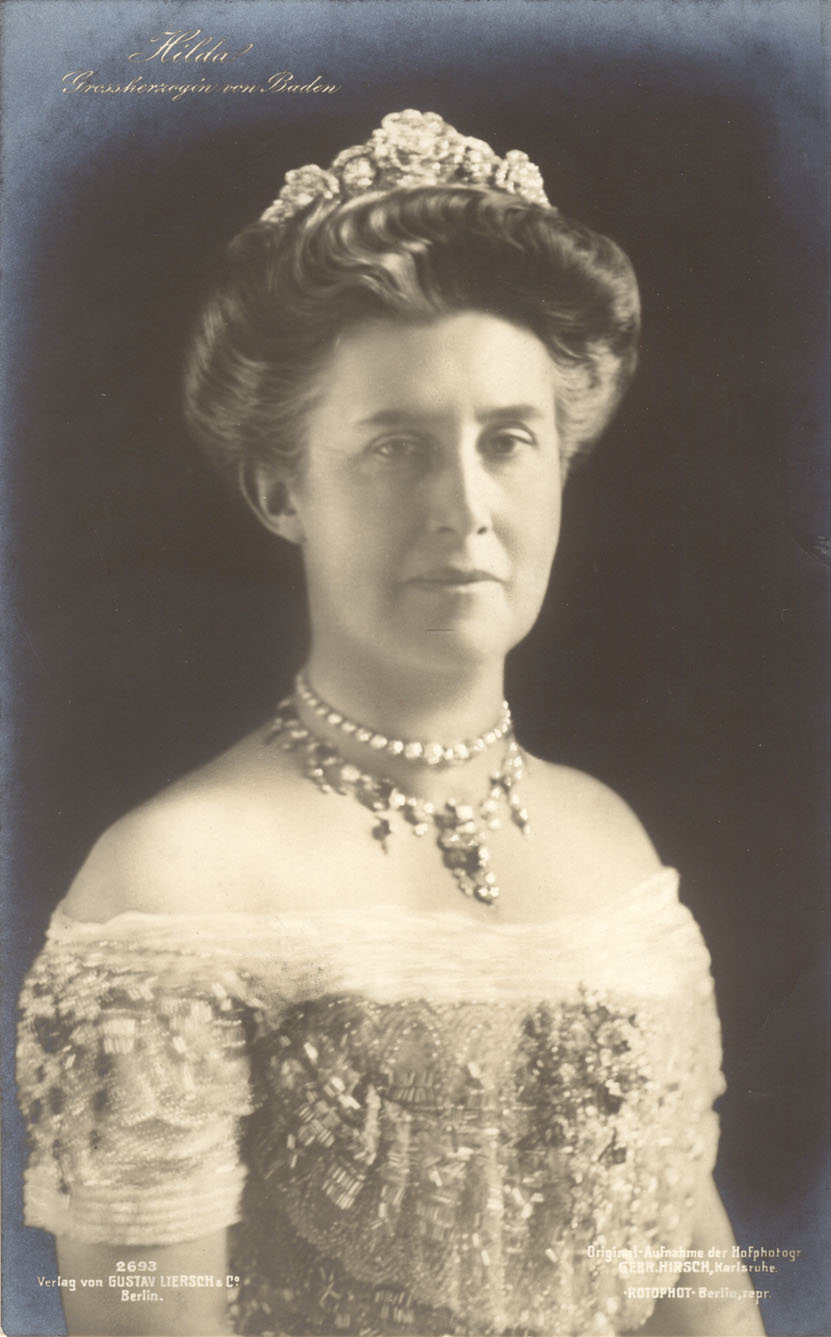
- Grand Duchess Hilda c. 1910

Grand Duchess consort of Baden
- Tenure: 28 September 1907 – 22 November 1918
- Born: 5 November 1864; Biebrich
- Died: 8 February 1952 (aged 87); Badenweiler
- Burial: Karlsruhe
- Spouse: Frederick II, Grand Duke of Baden (m. 1885; died 1928)
Names
- Hilda Charlotte Wilhelmine
- House: Nassau-Weilburg
- Father: Adolphe, Grand Duke of Luxembourg
- Mother: Princess Adelheid-Marie of Anhalt-Dessau

Princess Hilda of Nassau (Hilda Charlotte Wilhelmine; 5 November 1864 – 8 February 1952) was Grand Duchess of Baden from 28 September 1907 to 22 November 1918 as the consort of Grand Duke Frederick II. Hilda and Frederick were the last grand ducal couple of Baden.

The youngest daughter of Adolphe, Grand Duke of Luxembourg, who was Duke of Nassau until he was deposed in 1866, Hilda married the future Grand Duke Frederick II in 1885. The marriage did not produce surviving children. The couple became Grand Duke and Grand Duchess in 1907, however they were deposed in 1918 when all German monarchies were overthrown during the German revolution of 1918–1919.

== Biography ==
=== Early life ===
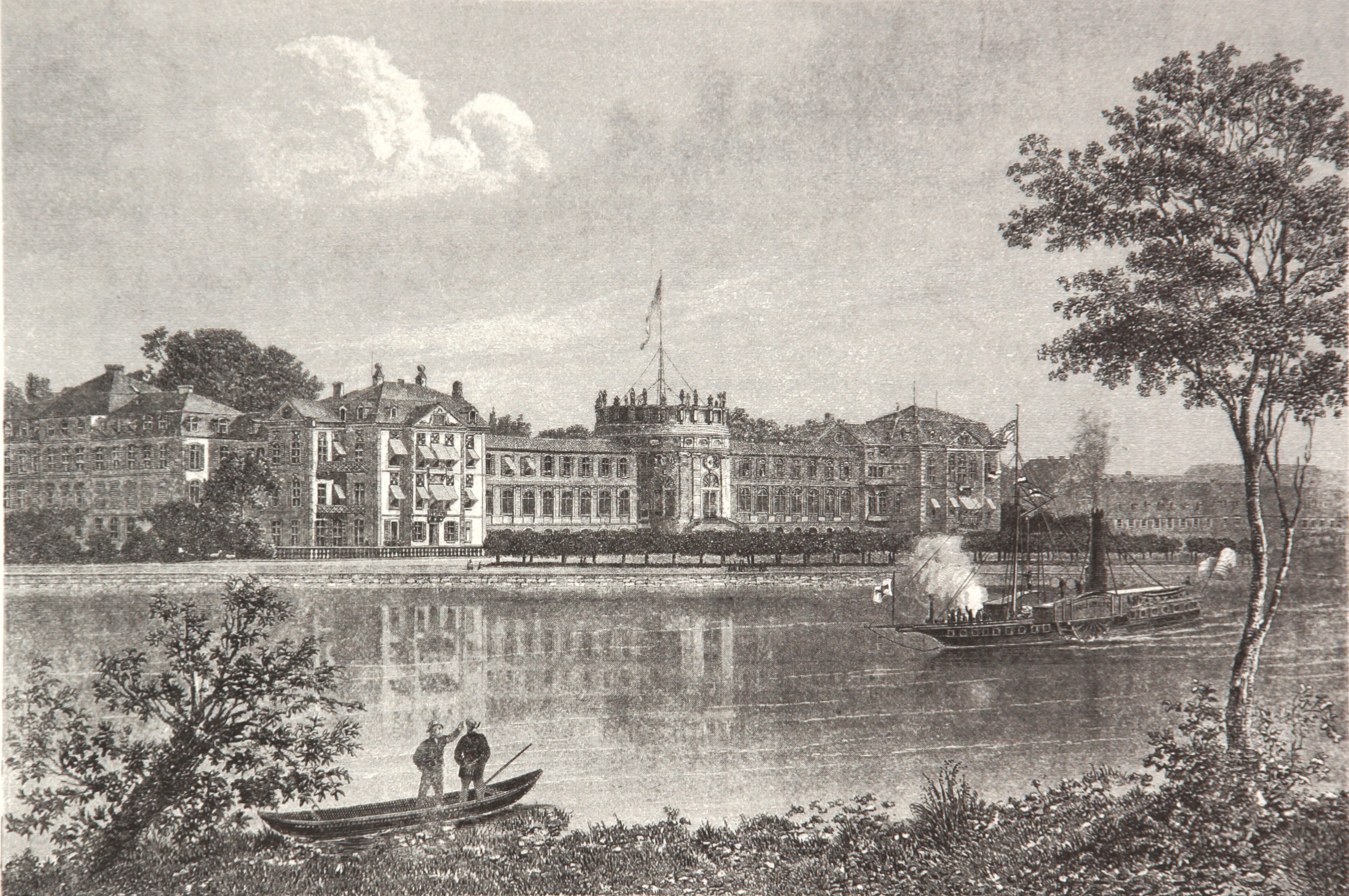
Biebrich Palace

Princess Hilda of Nassau was born on 5 November 1864 at Biebrich Palace near the city of Wiesbaden, then capital of the Duchy of Nassau. She was the second (but only surviving) daughter and fifth child born to Adolf, Duke of Nassau by his second wife Princess Adelheid-Marie of Anhalt-Dessau.

On 20 September 1866, when Hilda was nearly two years old, her father lost his throne as the Duchy of Nassau was annexed by the Kingdom of Prussia as a consequence of siding with the Austrian Empire during the Austro-Prussian War. The family subsequently lived in exile, and the later Grand Duchess of Baden grew up with her two surviving brothers, first in Königstein in the Taunus mountain range, from 1866 in Vienna and from 1870 at Hohenburg Palace at Lenggries in the Isar River valley in Upper Bavaria.

=== Marriage ===
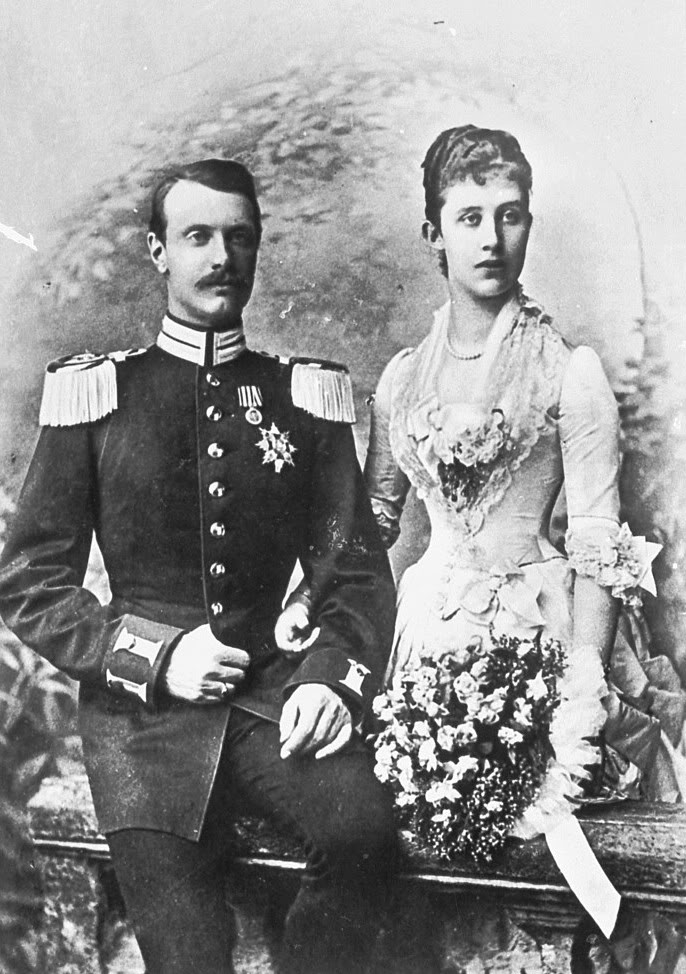
Princess Hilda and Hereditary Grand Duke Frederick of Baden at their engagement in 1885.

In 1885, at the age of 20, Princess Hilda was engaged to the 28-year-old Hereditary Grand Duke Frederick of Baden. He was heir to the Grand Duchy of Baden as the eldest son of Grand Duke Frederick I of Baden and Princess Louise of Prussia, the only daughter of Wilhelm I, German Emperor. The wedding was celebrated on 20 September 1885 at the bride's family's home at Hohenburg Palace. No surviving children were born from the marriage.

=== Hereditary Grand Duchess ===
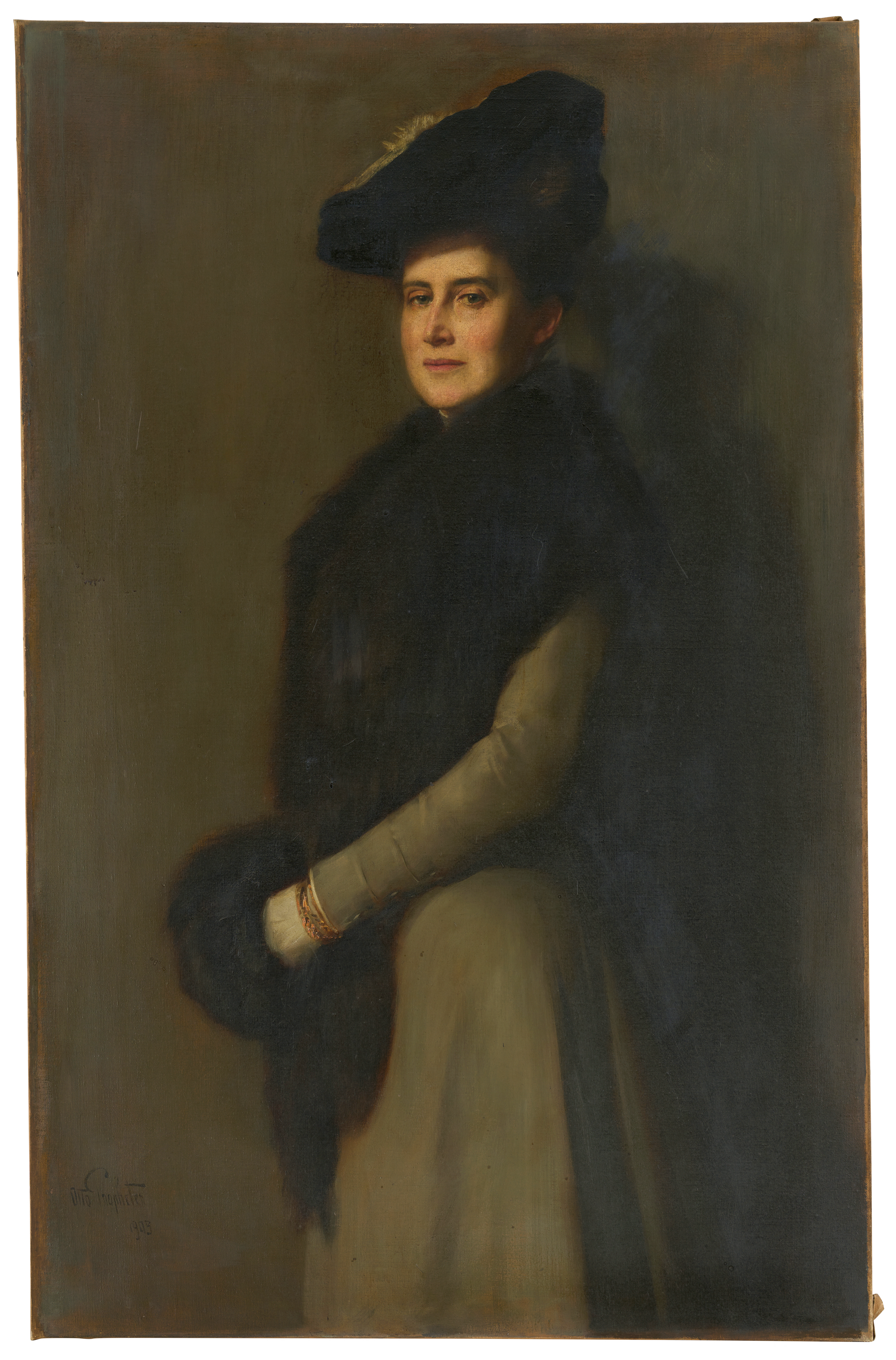
Portrait of Hilda as Hereditary Grand Duchess, by Otto Propheter, 1903.

For the first years after the wedding, Hereditary Grand Duchess Hilda lived with her husband in the various garrison towns where his military career saw him stationed: Freiburg im Breisgau, Berlin and Koblenz. Only from 1902, the Hereditary Grand Duke and Hereditary Grand Duchess took up permanent residence in Karlsruhe, the capital of the Grand Duchy of Baden, after Frederick left active army service because, as heir to the throne, he was expected to support the aging Grand Duke Frederick I.

=== Grand Duchess ===
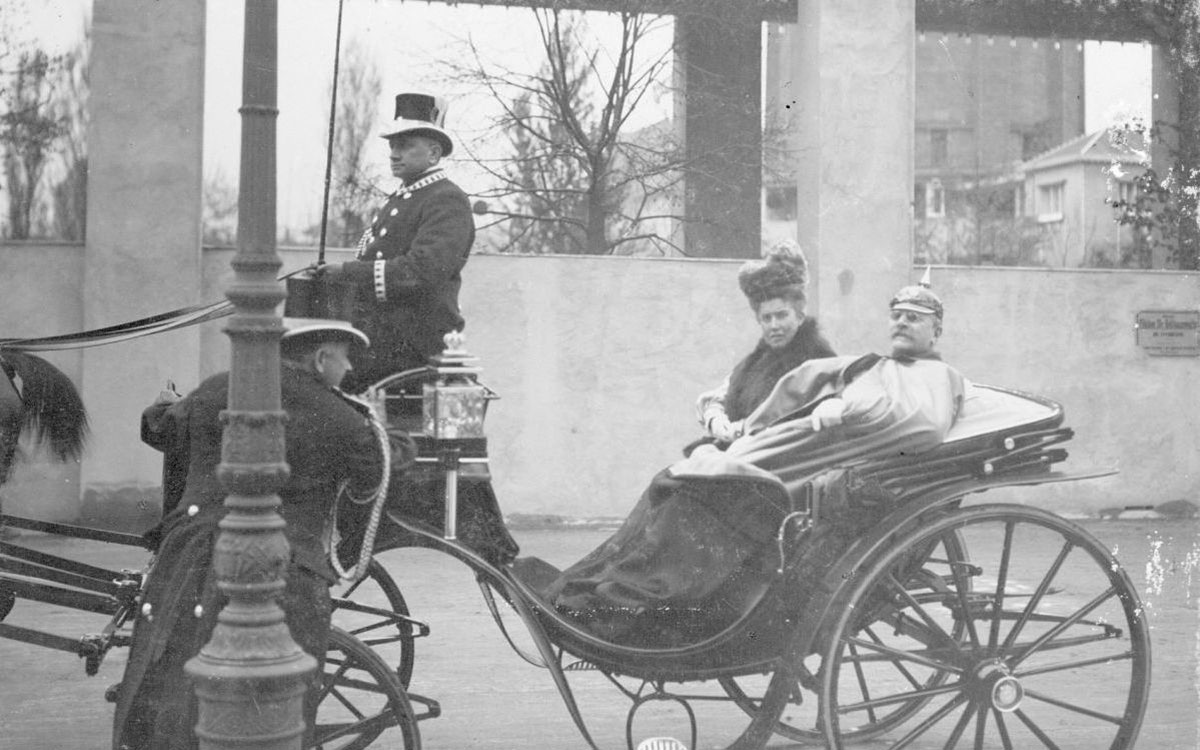
The Grand Duke and Grand Duchess of Baden in 1907.

On 28 September 1907, Hilda's father-in-law Grand Duke Frederick I died, and her husband became reigning grand duke as Frederick II, while Hilda became grand duchess consort of Baden.

As grand duchess, Hilda was described as intelligent and interested in art, and was often present at art-exhibitions and museums. She also took an interest in education. and several schools and streets, such as the schools Hilda-Gymnasium in Pforzheim, Hilda-Gymnasium in Koblenz, and the streets north- and south Hilda Promenade in Karlsruhe are named after her.

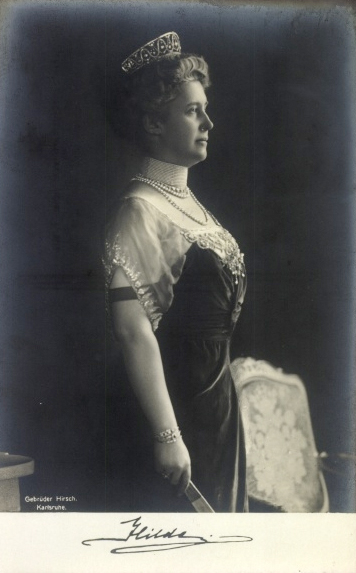
Grand Duchess Hilda, c. 1915.

Frederick and Hilda were deposed as Grand Duke and Grand Duchess of Baden in November 1918 when all German monarchies were overthrown during the German revolution at the end of World War I. At the time of the revolution, her sister-in-law, Queen Victoria of Sweden, was visiting the family. After the abdication of the German emperor, riots spread in Karlsruhe on 11 November. The son of a courtier led a group of soldiers up to the front of the palace, followed by a great crowd of people, where a few shots were fired. Hilda, as well as the rest of the family, left the palace the back way and left for the Zwingenberg palace in the Neckar valley. By permission of the new government, they were allowed to stay at the Langenstein Palace, which belonged to a Swedish count, Douglas. The government gave the order that the former grand ducal family was to be protected, and that Langenstein be excepted from housing the returning soldiers, because the Queen of Sweden was in their company, and Baden should not do anything to offend Sweden. In 1919, the family requested permission from the government to reside in Mainau, and was told that they were now private citizens and could do as they wished.

=== Later life ===
Hilda is described as a jolly and cheerful character with the ability to ease things up with her good sense of humor, an ability she used during the revolution and the years after, taking care of her husband whose health was weak.

The former grand duchess died on 8 February 1952 in Badenweiler. As Frederick and Hilda were without own direct heirs, they bequeathed their castle of Mainau to a grandson of Frederick's sister, Count Lennart Bernadotte, who was also a great-grandson of Hilda's aunt.

== Honours ==
- Kingdom of Prussia:
  - Dame of the Order of Louise, 1st Division
  - Red Cross Medal, 1st Class
- Kingdom of Bavaria: Dame of Honour of the Order of Theresa
- Baden:
  - Friedrich-Luise Medal
  - Jubilee Medal for 1902
  - Commemorative Medal for the Golden Jubilee of Grand Duke Friedrich I and Grand Duchess Luise

Princess Hilda of Nassau House of Nassau-Weilburg Born: 5 November 1864 Died: 8 February 1952
German royalty
| Preceded by Louise of Prussia | Grand Duchess consort of Baden; 28 September 1907 – 22 November 1918 | Monarchy abolished German Revolution |
Titles in pretence
| Loss of title Republic declared | — TITULAR — Grand Duchess consort of Baden; 22 November 1918 – 8 August 1928 | Succeeded by Marie Louise of Hanover |
