= Prince Louis of Baden =

German prince (1865–1888)

Louis of Baden
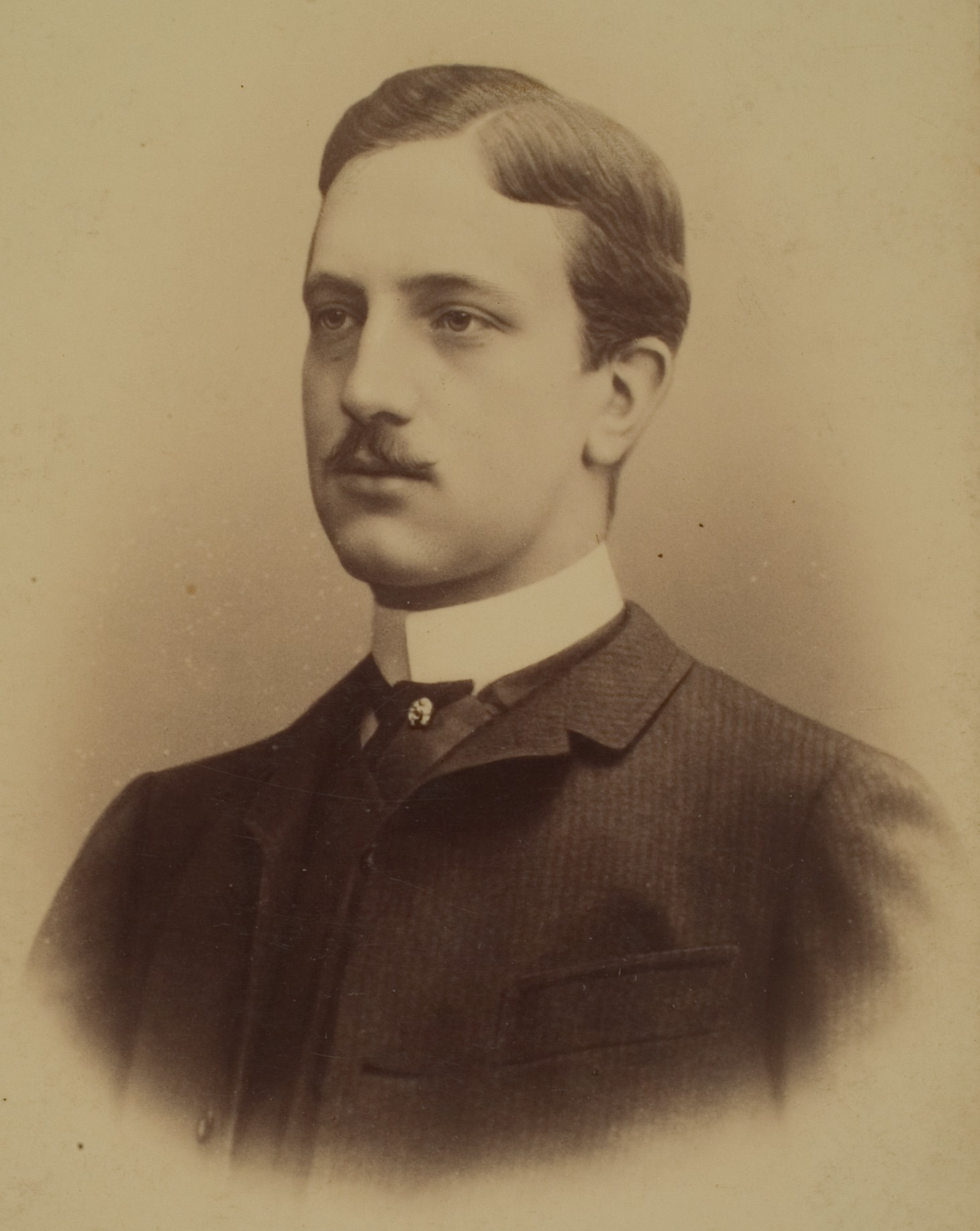
- Louis in the 1880s
- Born: 12 June 1865; Baden-Baden, Grand Duchy of Baden
- Died: 23 February 1888 (aged 22); Freiburg im Breisgau, Grand Duchy of Baden
- Burial: Grand Ducal burial chapel, Karlsruhe, Grand Duchy of Baden, German Confederation
Names
- Ludwig Wilhelm Karl Friedrich Berthold
- House: Zähringen
- Father: Frederick I, Grand Duke of Baden
- Mother: Princess Louise of Prussia

Prince Louis of Baden (German: Ludwig Wilhelm Karl Friedrich Berthold; 12 June 1865 – 24 February 1888) was the youngest son of Grand Duke Frederick I of Baden and Princess Louise of Prussia.

== Biography ==
He graduated from high school in 1883 and joined the Baden Army. He completed his military education in Potsdam.

=== Death ===
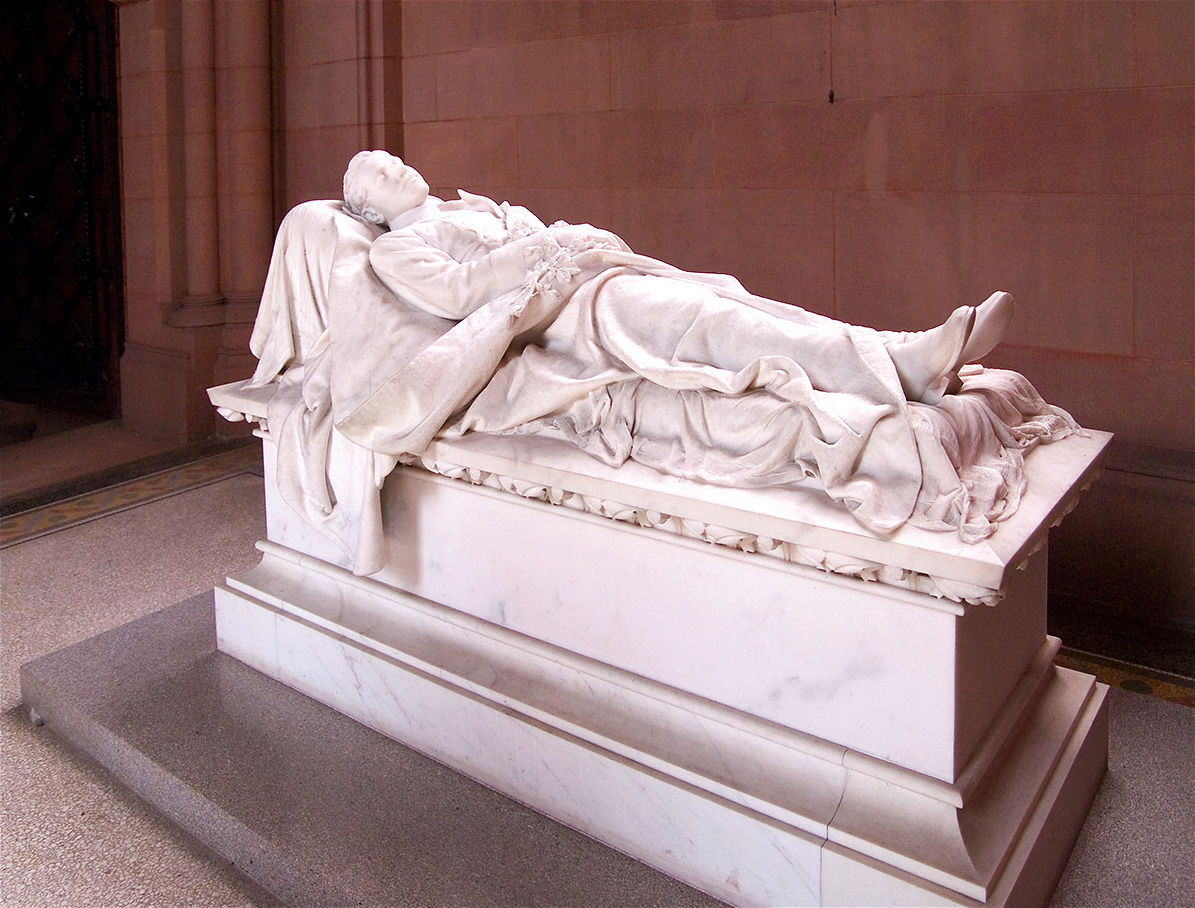
The tomb designed by Hermann Volz.

According to official historical accounts, Prince Louis died of pneumonia, however there are also reports of him being killed in a duel.

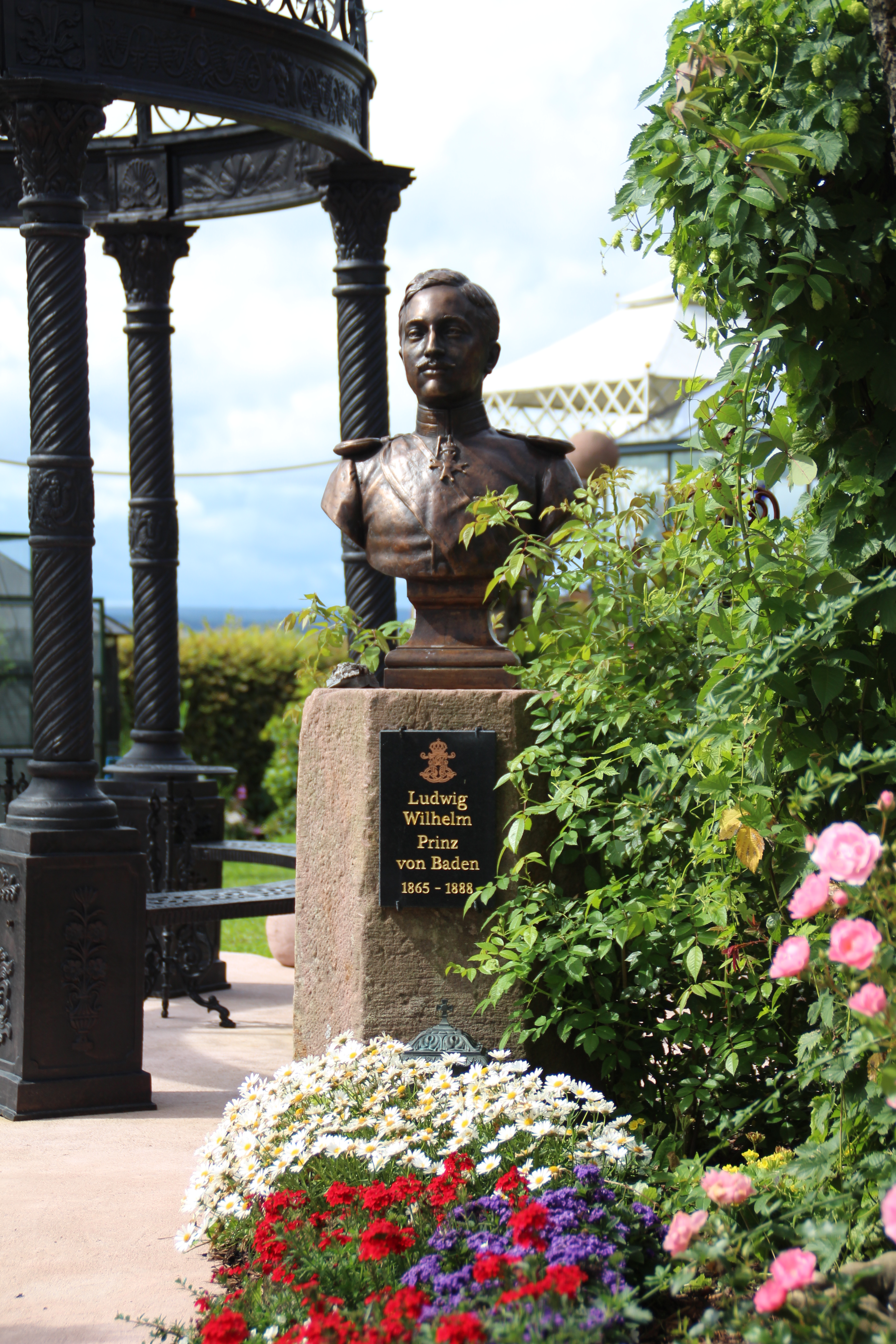
Monument on the Warterhöhe near Altensteig.

He is buried in the Grand Ducal burial chapel in Karlsruhe, which was commissioned by his parents on the occasion of his early death. His tomb was created by Hermann Volz. A memorial stands on the Warterhöhe near Altensteig.
