= Adèle de Pierre =

Swiss educator and translator (1800–1890)

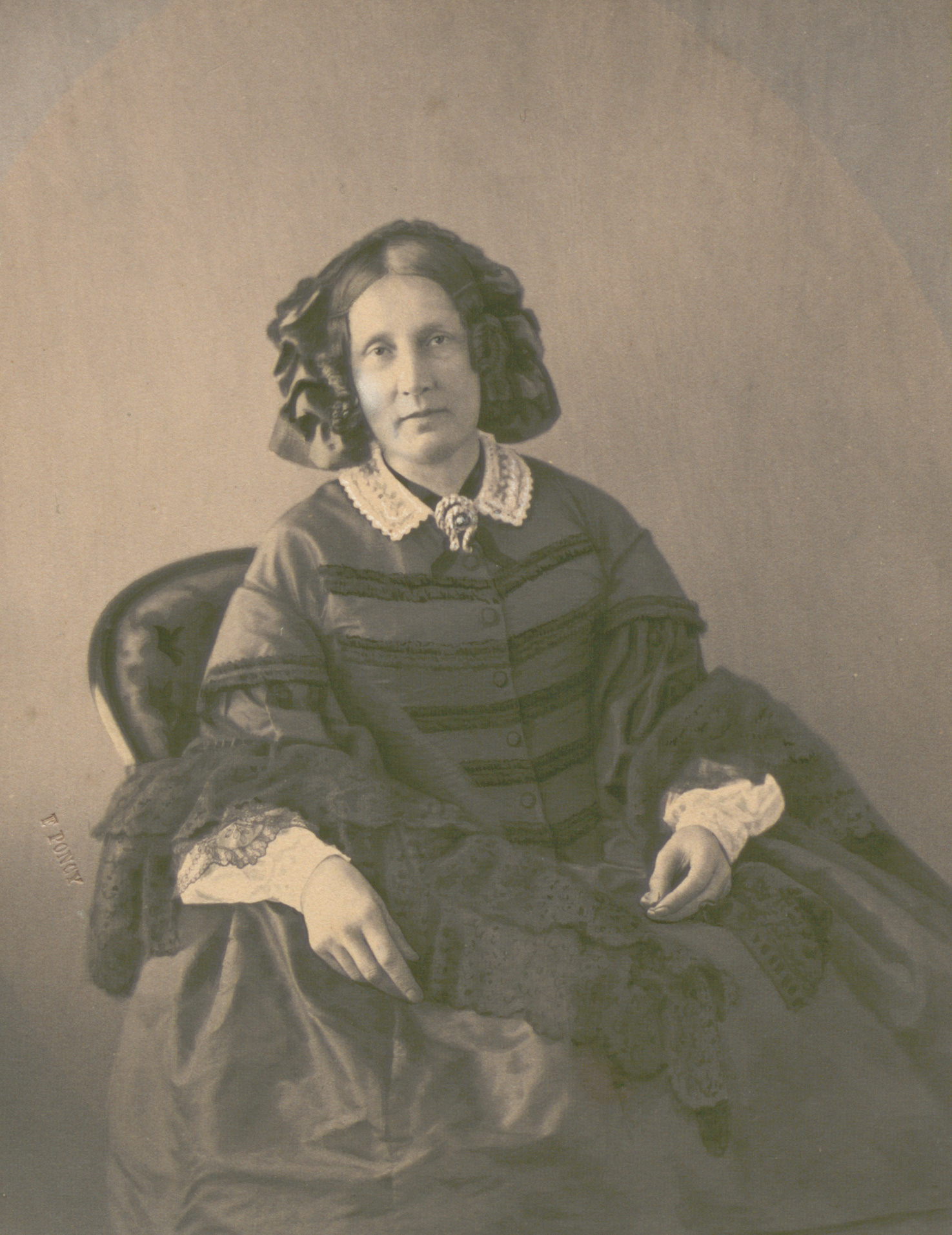
Adèle de Pierre, c. 1850

Adèle de Pierre (1 April 1800 – 5 August 1890) was a Swiss educator and translator, who worked at the Prussian court in Berlin. She was governess to Princess Louise of Prussia. She translated Uli der Knecht and Uli der Pächter by the Swiss writer Jeremias Gotthelf into French.

== Biography ==
Adèle de Pierre was born 1 April 1800. She was a member of one of the leading families of Neuchâtel, then a subject state of Prussia, whose court had a tradition of employing Neuchâtelois governesses. Her father Philippe-Auguste de Pierre served as Councillor of State, and her mother was Charlotte Julie Philippe, née de Bosset. She had a brother who was a winemaker and estate manager.

From 1851 to 1853, de Pierre was the educator of Princess Louise of Prussia at the Berlin court. King Wilhelm I later awarded her the title of canoness of the Lutheran Order of Magdeburg. De Pierre did not marry, and died on 5 August 1890.

In the 1850s, de Pierre translated the novels Uli der Knecht and Uli der Pächter by the Swiss writer Jeremias Gotthelf into French as Ulric le valet de ferme and Ulric le fermier. Gotthelf's works were popular at the Prussian court at that time.
