= Order of Berthold the First =

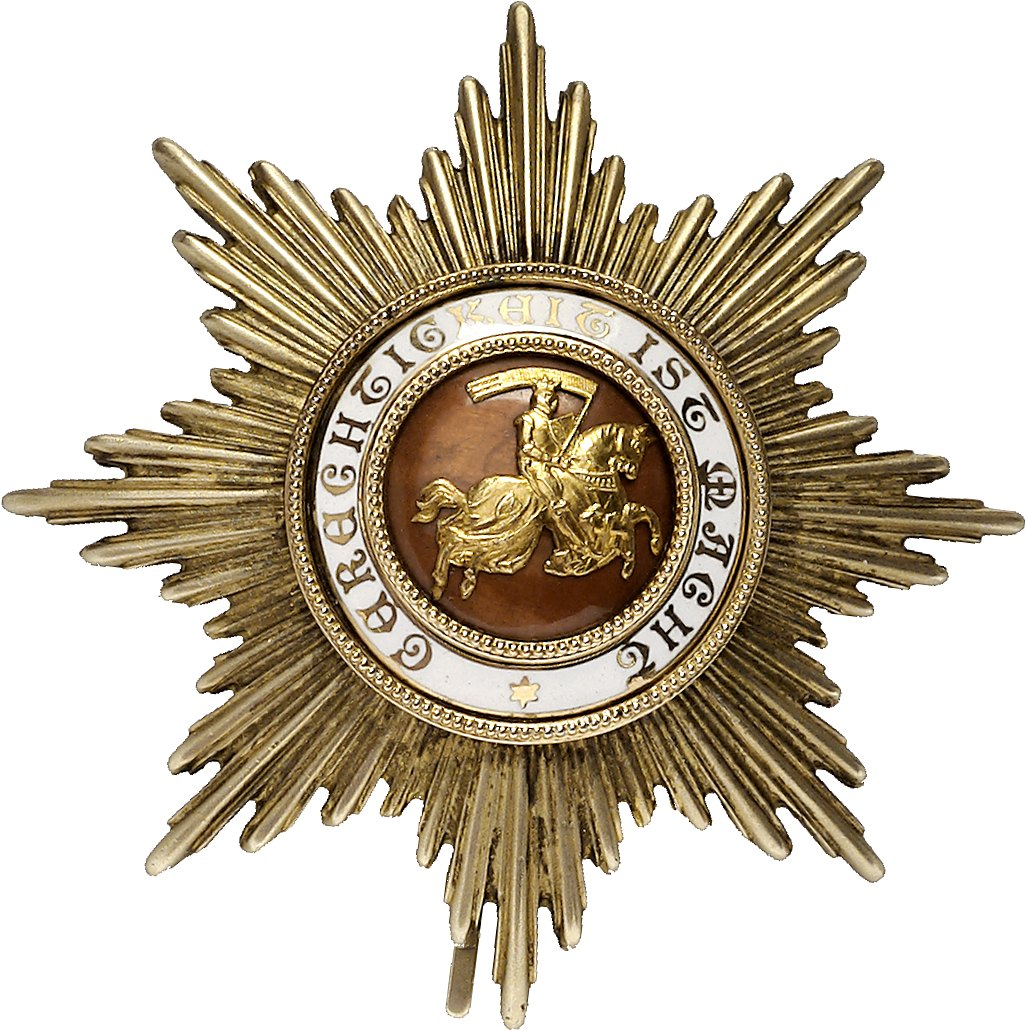
- Star of the order
- Type: Order of merit
- Established: 29 April 1877
- Country: Grand Duchy of Baden
- Royal house: House of Zähringen
- Ribbon: Red with narrow gold stripes at each edge
- Motto: GERECHTIGKEIT IST MACHT
- Criteria: For faithful service or as a special show of recognition and benevolence
- Founder: Frederick I, Grand Duke of Baden
- Grand Master: Grand Duke of Baden
- Classes: Grand Cross; Grand Commander (1st Class) and Commander (2nd Class); Knight

Precedence
- Next (higher): Military Karl-Friedrich Merit Order
- Next (lower): Order of the Zähringer Lion
- Ribbon of the order

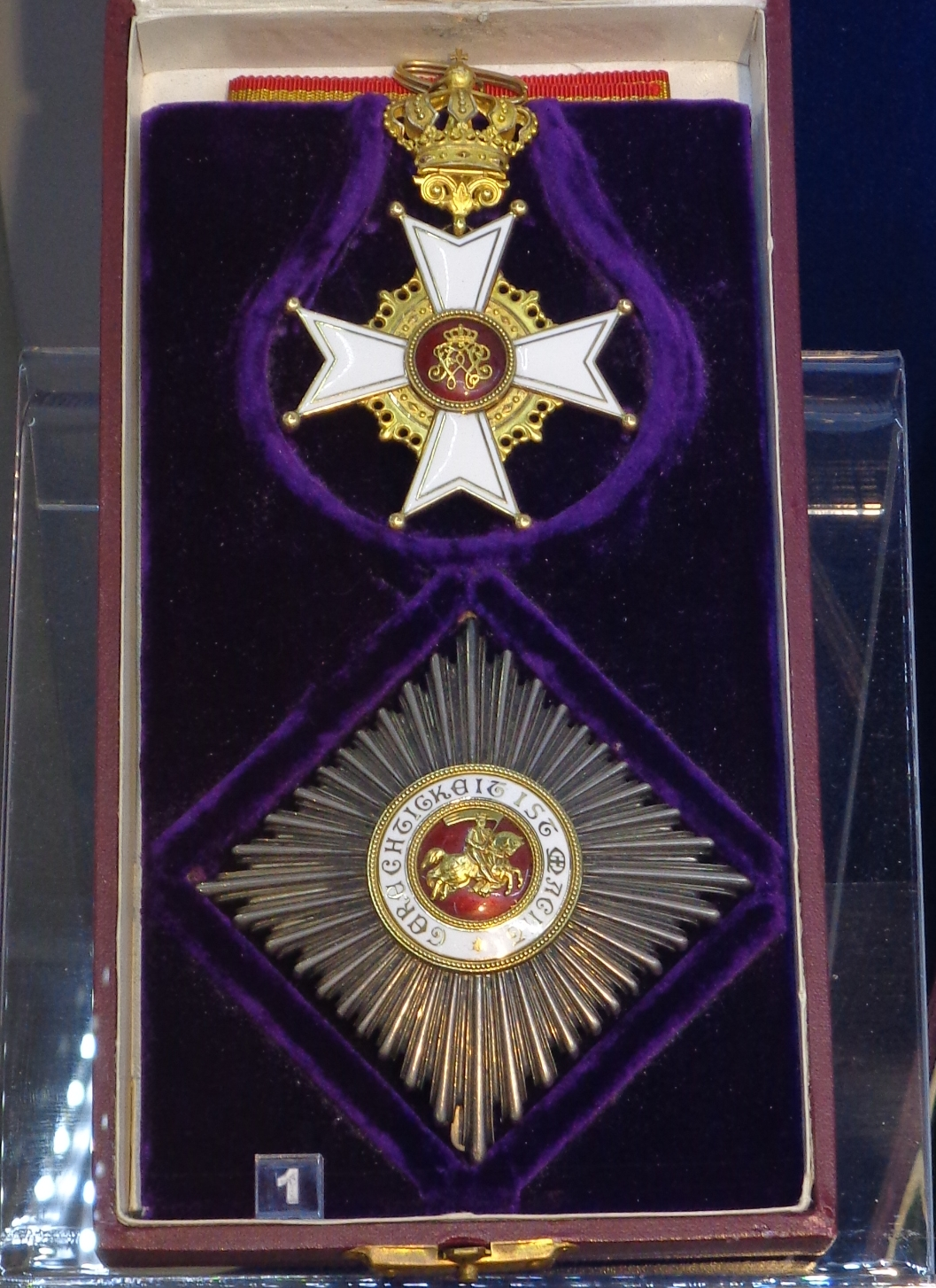
Commander 1st class badge and star

The Order of Berthold the First (German: Orden Berthold des Ersten) was a dynastic order in the Grand Duchy of Baden. It was established on 29 April 1877 by Frederick I, Grand Duke of Baden to mark the twenty-fifth anniversary of his accession as an additional class above the grand cross of the Order of the Zähringer Lion. On his seventieth birthday Frederick I separated it from that order and gave it statutes as an order in its own right. After that date, the order could be given to all persons for faithful service or as a special show of recognition and benevolence.

== Classes ==
Originally awarded in only one class, in 1896 it was expanded to three classes:

- Grand Cross
- Grand Commander (1st Class) and Commander (2nd Class)
- Knight

Two crossed swords were added if the award was for military service.

== Insignia ==
=== Badge ===
The badge is a gold white-cut Maltese cross with gold spheres at the tips and medieval ducal crowns in the angles. At the centre is a red enamel circle with a gold border and a crowned gold monogram. The suspension ring is attached to a grand ducal crown.

=== Star ===
This is eight beamed and gold or four beamed and silver, depending on the class. It has a central round panel showing Berthold IV, Duke of Zähringen on horseback, based on his 1177 seal for the Stift am Grossmünster in Zurich, which was mistaken in 1877 for Berthold I (c. 1000–1078), Duke of Carinthia. The central panel is surrounded by "GERECHTIGKEIT IST MACHT" (Justice is Power) in medieval style lettering.

The eight-point-star badge for recipients of the Grand Cross was worn on the left breast, using a shoulder sash worn from the left shoulder to the right hip. Commanders 1st class wear the cross of the order at their collar, commanders 2nd class wear a four-beamed silver star on the left breast and knights a cross on the left breast. In special cases the grand cross could also be awarded with a golden chain. The ribbon of the order was red with narrow gold stripes down each side.

== Awards ==
Excludes awards to foreign sovereigns and to members of the grand ducal house of Baden.

Form	Awards
Gold chain	15
Grand Cross	172
Grand Cross with swords	24
Star in diamonds	1
Star with swords	2
Commander 1st Class	73
Commander 1st Class with swords	10
Commander 2nd Class	97
Commander 2nd Class with swords	1
Knight's cross	347
Knight's cross with swords	22

== Bibliography ==
- (in German) Arnhard Graf Klenau: Orden in Deutschland und Österreich. Band II: Deutsche Staaten (1806–1918). Teil I: Anhalt–Hannover. Offenbach 2008. ISBN 3-937064-13-3. S. 54–57.
- (in German) Lars Adler, Franz Hannesschläger: Der badische Orden Berthold des Ersten von Zähringen. Die Stiftung des letzten Verdienstordens im Großherzogtum Baden. in: OuE-Magazin. Deutsche Gesellschaft für Ordenskunde. 12. Jahrgang. Heft 68. (August 2010) S. 194–203.
- (in German) Hennig Volle: Badens Orden. Freiburg im Breisgau 1976. S. 46ff.
