= Lars Adler =

German archivist and historian

Lars Adler (born 1976) is a German historian, archivist and phalerist. He has written two works on the orders of Baden.

== Sources ==
- "Landesbibliographie Baden-Württemberg". Statistisches Landesamt Baden-Württemberg (in German). Archived from the original on 13 December 2015.
- "Prof. Dr. Lars Adler". Institut für Geschichte – TU Darmstadt (in German).
